= Lee's Ferry and Lonely Dell Ranch =

- U.S. National Register of Historic Places
- U.S. Historic district
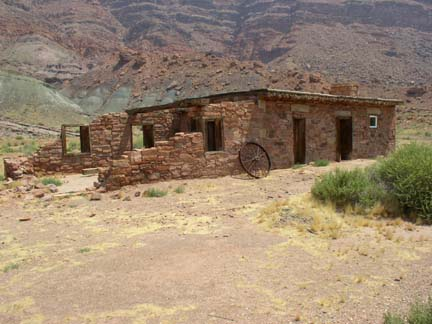
- Lee's Ferry Fort

- Location within Arizona Location within the United States
- Location: Coconino County, Arizona, USA
- Nearest city: Marble Canyon, Arizona
- Coordinates: 36°51′53″N 111°35′40″W
- Built: 1872
- Architect: John D. Lee, Jacob Hamblin
- NRHP reference No.: 97001234
- Added to NRHP: November 4, 1997

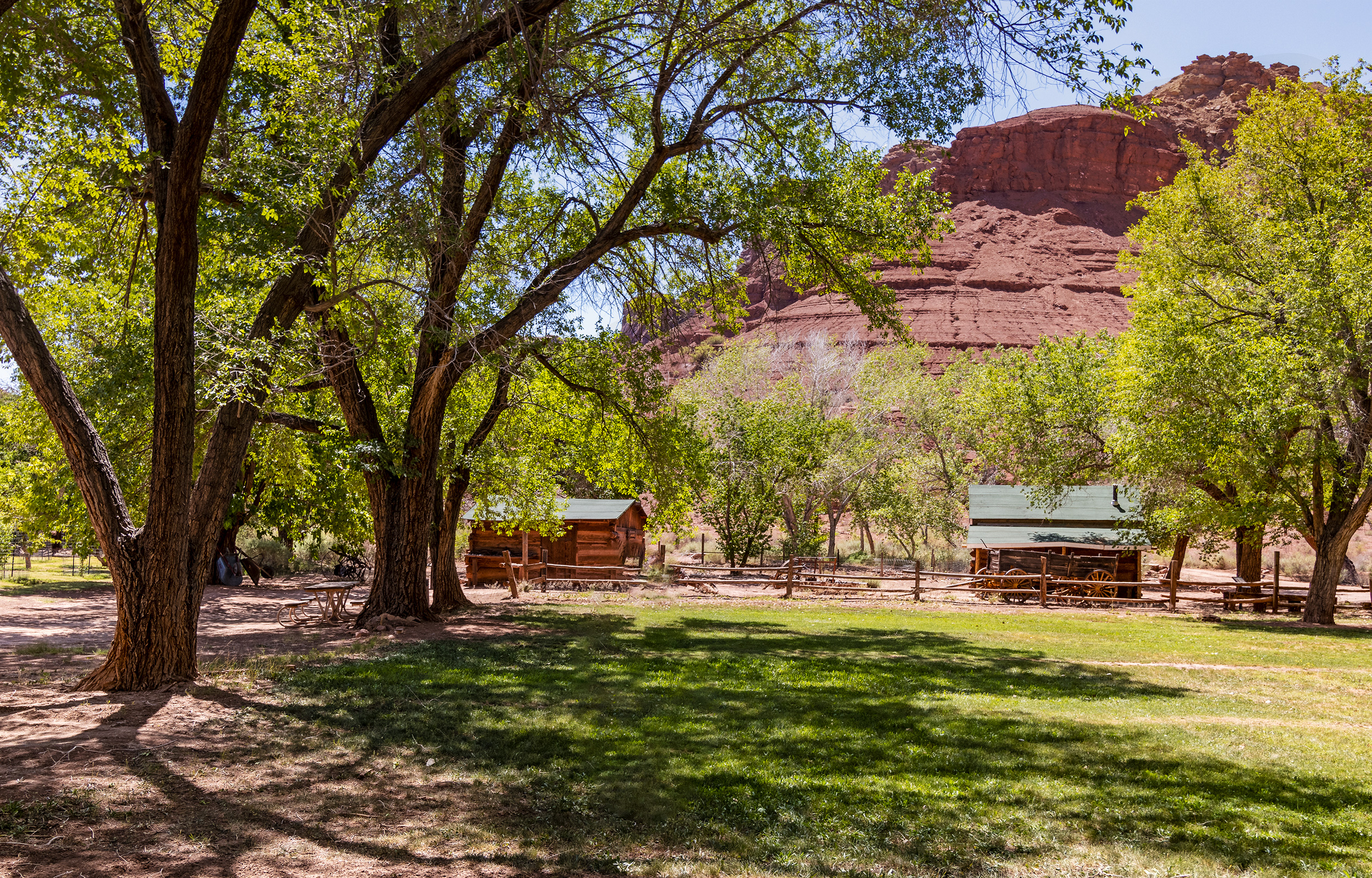
Lonely Dell Ranch Property

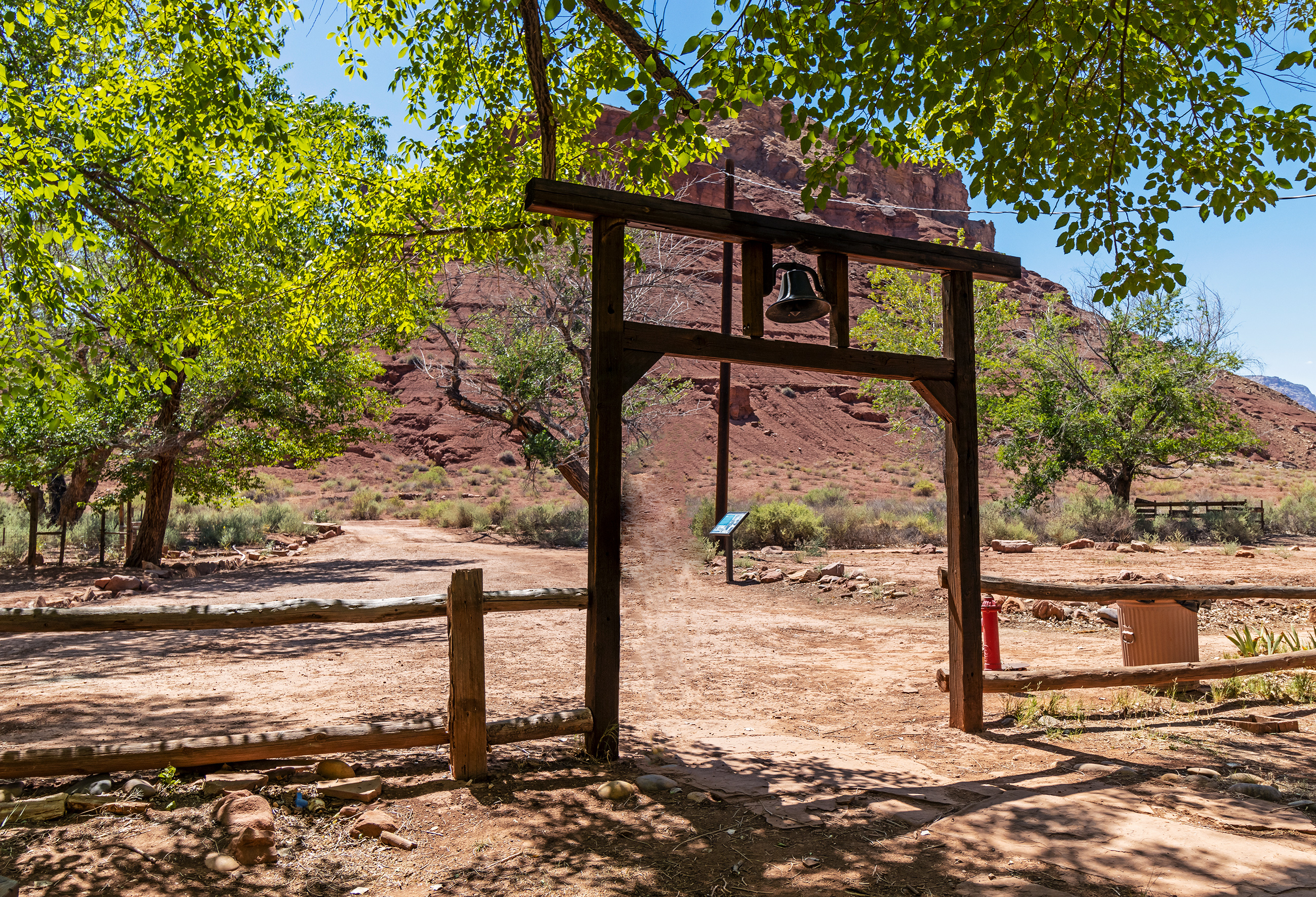
Lonely Dell Ranch Entrance

The Lee's Ferry and Lonely Dell Ranch Historic District includes the ranch homesteaded by Mormon pioneer John D. Lee at Lees Ferry, Arizona, and now in Glen Canyon National Recreation Area. It is notable for its association with Lee, the ferry and the ranch's extensive irrigation facilities. The district was originally designated the Lonely Dell Ranch Historic District on the National Register of Historic Places in 1978, but was expanded to include Lee's Ferry in 1997.

Lees Ferry occupies an area on either side of the Colorado River, while Lonely Dell Ranch nearby on the west bank of Paria Canyon, leaving a space of fertile bottomland available for cultivation. The period of significance for the district extends from the 1871 arrival of the Lees to the last run of the ferry in 1928, superseded by the new Navajo Bridge.

== John D. Lee ==
Lee was a practicing polygamist who built cabins for two of his families at Lees Ferry. His wife Emma named the ranch at Lees Ferry "Lonely Dell" due to its austere remoteness. Lee's ferry started service on January 11, 1873, ferrying Mormon settlers across the river. Tensions rose between the settlers and the Navajo, whose lands were being occupied by the settlers, resulting in the construction of the Lee's Ferry Fort at the crossing in 1874. No conflict arose at the ferry, so the fort became a trading post, then a residence. In 1877 Lee was executed for his role in the Mountain Meadows massacre. In 1879, the LDS Church bought the ferry rights from Emma Lee, granting the ferry service to Warren Marshall Johnson and his families. A number of structures remain in the district from the polygamist period of the Lee and Johnson families.

== American Placer Corporation ==
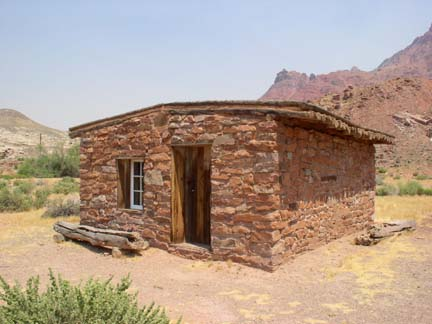
American Placer Corporation office

The American Placer Corporation office was established at Lee's Ferry in 1910 and abandoned the next year. In that interval, the company constructed a steamboat, the Charles H. Spencer, named for the company's founder, to transport coal mined farther up the river to the company's amalgamation operation at Lee's Ferry. The boat, in use for one year, was docked and finally sank in a 1921 flood. Its remains are visible in the river, and it is separately listed on the National Register of Historic Places.

In 1922 the office building was re-occupied as the Lee's Ferry Post Office, but was abandoned in 1924. Another brief use came in 1931.

== Irrigation ==
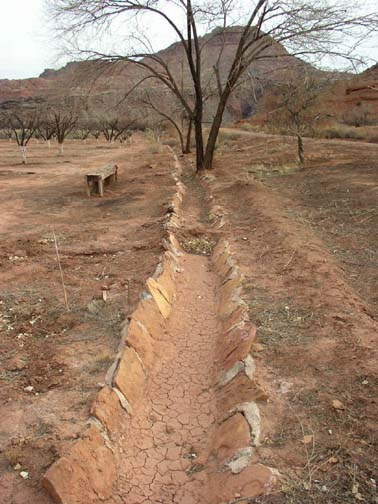
Stone-lined irrigation ditches

Lee started construction of the first earthen dam on the Paria River in January 1872 and by March irrigated his first crop. By April this first dam washed out. Lee soon replaced the dam reinforced with a large base log packed with brush, rocks, and dirt. The dam was subsequently washed out and rebuilt many times over the coming years. In 1883, in order to bring water to an upper field, Warren Johnson constructed a dam on a second site higher up the Paria. By 1900, the dams were replaced with new ones made of logs and sandbags. In 1905, Irving Pierce constructed a tunnel-and-flume delivery system to replace the ditches bringing water from the upper dam to the fields. By the time Leo Weaver bought the ranch in 1935, several more dams had been washed out. Weaver's attempt to replace the dams also failed. Gus and Warren Griffin made improvements upon the system, including a stone lined ditch. Most of what exists today is related to the Griffin improvements In 1965, the consortium that owned the ranch created two holding ponds for irrigation water against the west wall of Paria canyon. In 1977, the National Park Service pumped water from the Colorado River instead of the Paria. The Park Service constructed a new holding tank near the south end of the site, at the same time removing remains of the flume system and valve platform for a trail. This system remains in use as of 1999.

== Lead etching ==
In January 2002 a lead plate, or scroll, was found in the Lee's Ferry Fort with an etching purporting to be by John D. Lee in 1872. It was discovered by a National Parks worker while cleaning up inside the structure, which is restricted from public access. The brief writing accused Mormon leaders Brigham Young and George A. Smith of ordering the Mountain Meadows Massacre, for which Lee was convicted and sentenced to die. Despite some evidence suggesting this is a forgery, historian Will Bagley claims it fits with the historical context and Lee's writing style. He wrote, "If the scroll is a fake, it is a good one--so good that only a few people could have pulled it off." Forensic investigator George Throckmorton, who helped crack the Mark Hofmann forgeries, examined the plate in 2003 and took samples for chemical analysis in 2007.
