= Marble Canyon, Arizona =

Unincorporated community in the state of Arizona, United States

- Unincorporated community
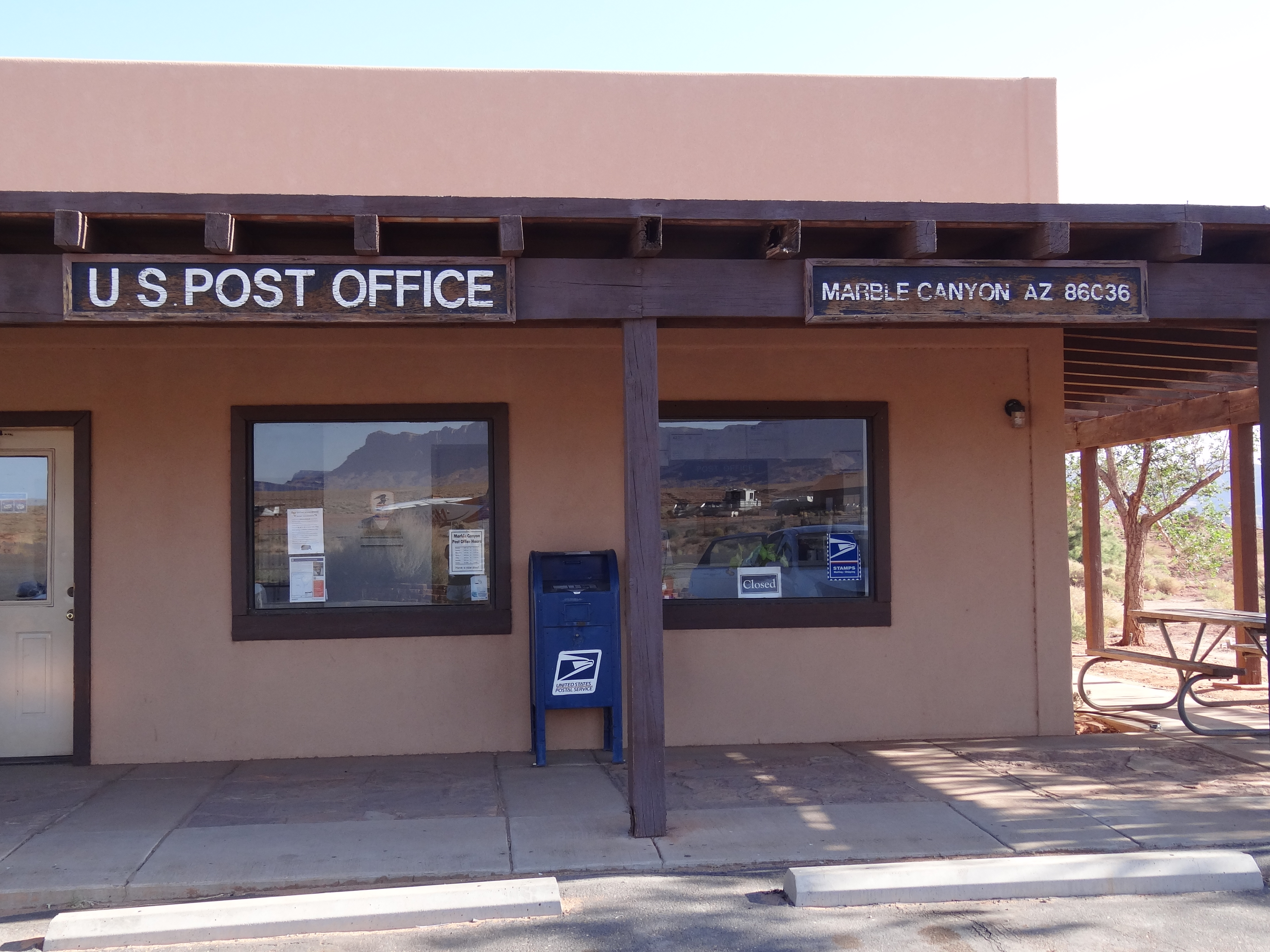
- Post office in Marble Canyon, June 2013

- Location within Arizona Location within the United States
- Coordinates: 36°48′56″N 111°38′16″W
- Country: United States
- State: Arizona
- County: Coconino
- Elevation: 3,573 ft (1,089 m)
- Time zone: UTC-7 (Mountain (MST))
- ZIP code: 86036
- Area code: 928
- GNIS feature ID: 25252

Marble Canyon is an unincorporated community along the Colorado River in Coconino County, Arizona, United States. It is partially located within the Glen Canyon National Recreation Area and the Grand Canyon National Park.

== Description ==
Marble Canyon is located on U.S. Route 89A on the north side of the Navajo Bridge, 12 miles (19 km) southwest of Page. Marble Canyon has a post office with ZIP code 86036. Marble Canyon is near Lee's Ferry, the former location of a ferry established by John D. Lee, a Mormon settler. It is often used by people entering the Colorado River for fishing and rafting trips.

== Climate ==
According to the Köppen Climate Classification system, Marble Canyon has a semi-arid climate, abbreviated "BSk" on climate maps.

== Transportation ==
U.S. Route 89A is the main road through the community.

Trans-Canyon Shuttle offers a seasonal daily shuttle between Grand Canyon Village.
