= Wrather =

Wrather is a surname. Notable people with the surname include:

- Jack Wrather (1918–1984), American businessman and television producer
- Jonathan Wrather (born 1969), English actor
- William Embry Wrather (1883–1963), American geologist
- Ben Wrather (born 2001), American football player

== See also ==
- Wrather Arch, natural arch in Arizona, United States
- Mount Wrather, mountain in Ellsworth Land, Antarctica
