= Emma Lee French =

English-born American nurse and pioneer (1836–1897)

Personal life
- Born: Emma Louise Batchelor Lee French; 21 April 1836 Uckfield, East Sussex, England
- Died: 16 November 1897 (aged 61)
- Resting place: Winslow, Arizona

Religious life
- Religion: Latter Day Saints

Emma Louise Batchelor Lee French (21 April 1836 – 16 November 1897), better known as Emma Lee French, was an English nurse born in Uckfield, East Sussex. She travelled to Utah and Arizona in the United States, where she became well known as a carer for the sick.

== Journey to Salt Lake City ==
After being converted to Mormonism, Emma Lee arrived in Chicago from England. She then headed to Iowa, where she pushed a cart filled with goods given by her church. She then left for Salt Lake City, Utah. She pushed the cart herself for the 1,400 mile walk, as one of the many Mormon handcart pioneers.

She joined a company of her church's members for that trip, of which 150 died during snowstorms. Many others suffered from other illness, such as frozen feet, noses and other diseases. Emma Lee helped care for them, eventually leading to most of them fully recovering. During the trip, she also served as midwife to a pregnant woman, carrying her in the cart as the woman was close to delivering.

== Life with John D. Lee ==
Upon arriving in Salt Lake City, she worked for one year as an indentured servant to pay for her trip from England. Afterwards, she met John D. Lee, a prominent man among Latter-day Saints members. Brigham Young married the couple on 7 January 1858. Emma was John's 17th wife.

John D. Lee was eventually convicted for his participation in the Mountain Meadows massacre that left 140 people dead. Before this, John and Emma Lee were followed by federal marshals for about twenty years. At one time John Lee was tried but was freed after a hung jury. In 1868, George Hicks, a columnist from Harmony, Utah, wrote in a local newspaper that the Lees had to leave town in ten days or John would be hanged.

Emma then spoke personally with George Hicks, warning him not to keep making threats against her and her husband. Hicks relented, never speaking against the Lees on his column again. He did, however, complain about the Lees to the town's Bishop, who proposed that Hicks and Lee should be baptized together. Emma Lee agreed, but not without complaining; she told the bishop she'd do it "seeing that (the bishop) are so inconsiderate as to require a woman to be immersed when the water is full of snow and that too for defending the rights of her husband". She continued on, saying: "Perhaps if (the bishop's) backside gets wet in ice water (he) will be more careful how (he) decide again". Impressed by her speech, the bishop then agreed not to go on with the baptism.

Lee was ordered to carry out important tasks for the Mormons, and in 1871, he was sent to the Colorado River, near the border between Arizona and Utah, to establish a ferry service in a location now known as Lee's Ferry.

Because, under Mormon doctrine, John Doyle Lee was allowed to have multiple wives, he had to travel much of the time, to attend to his other wives and children. Lee often left to visit his "gold mines". As a consequence, Emma Lee was left to attend both the ferry and her children. When Emma Lee left Lonely Dell after Lee's death, she had several coffee cans of gold. At one time there was a gold map showing the location of the mine which is now under Lake Powell.

In 1873, a settlement of Navajo people came up near the Lee home. Fearful for her children's fate, she decided to befriend the Navajos, and discovered that the tribe's chief was a friend of her husband's. They spent one night at the Navajo camp, after which the Navajo left. At one time, a Navajo Chief came into Emma's lodge to attack her, but Emma had a steaming pot of water on the stove. She threw the hot water into his face. Later, the chief came back and apologized and asked medical attention for the burns. Afterwards, he told his tribe that Emma was a very powerful woman and had a great spirit and to leave her alone. Another time, a group of warriors camped nearby. Emma heard them talking about killing her and the children. In response, she took the children and camped with the Navajos.

Later that year, Emma Lee gave birth to her sixth baby. With John Doyle gone, she had to ask the oldest person besides her at the Lee house, her son John Jr., to help her cut the umbilical cord. They did this task to perfection, and a daughter was safely born.

John Doyle Lee was caught by the US Army, tried again for the Meadow Mountain Massacre, found guilty, and shot by a firing squad on 23 March 1877, and buried at the site of the massacre. With small children and economically in need, Emma Lee sold the ferry to the LDS Church for 100 milk cows in 1879. She was helped by a Civil War veteran, Franklin French. French was a wandering gold prospector.

== Life with Franklin French ==
On 9 August 1879, Emma Lee and French married, in Snowflake, Arizona. They found a home near Holbrook, Arizona. Afterwards, they moved to the White Mountains. The White Mountain Apaches rose up in 1882 and killed 150 settlers that night. Emma was warned just before the attack on her ranch and was able to escape with her children and some ranch hands. She heard the shooting of the livestock and saw the smoke from the burning buildings. Later, French sued the government for $10,000 for the loss of the ranch, but the land was resurveyed and was found to be on Apache land.

In 1887 she and Franklin moved to Winslow, Arizona, and established a dairy ranch. At that time, the Santa Fe railroad was being built. Many times, the railroad would send a special train to bring Emma to help take care of the railroad workers injuries. She was known as "Dr. French", although she had no official medical title. She helped multiple women, including Navajos and prostitutes, give birth.

In 1888, her daughter, Victoria Lee, committed suicide. In 1892, her son Ike confronted a man who was trying to seduce his wife and was murdered by the man.

== Death ==
On 17 November, she was fixing breakfast when she said "I don't feel too well" and suffered a heart attack. A crowd of businessmen, Navajos and prostitutes kept vigil outside her home as she lay in bed dying that night.

Her funeral was one of the largest held in Winslow. The Santa Fe railway stopped their trains as a tribute to her.

Her tombstone is in the old cemetery in Winslow, Arizona, marked as "Dr. French".

== See also ==
- Lee's Ferry and Lonely Dell Ranch
