= Marble Canyon =

Section of the Colorado River in Arizona

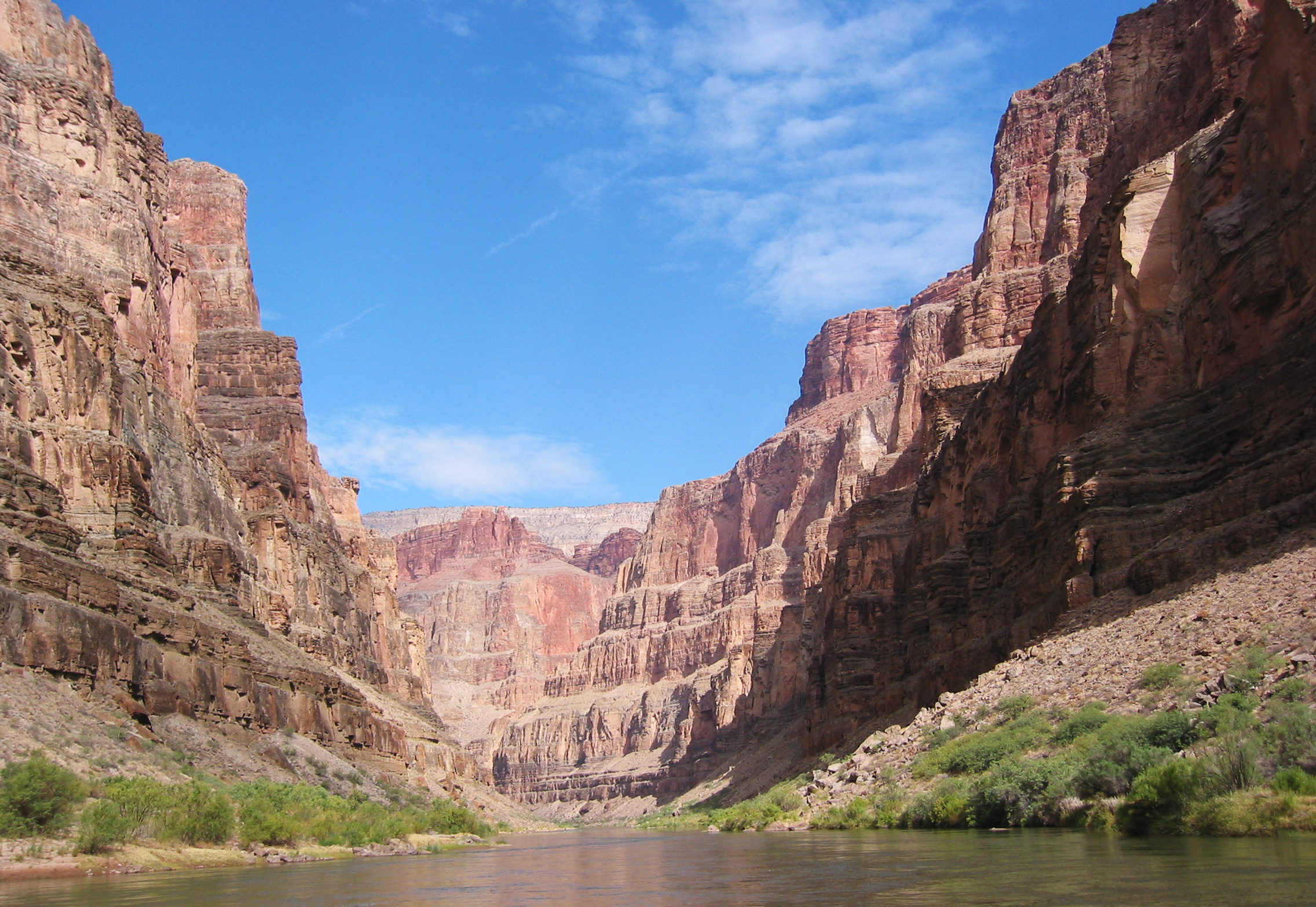
- A section of Marble Canyon from river level

Geography
- Coordinates: 36°51′49″N 111°35′25″W
- Interactive map of Marble Canyon

Marble Canyon is the section of the Colorado River canyon in northern Arizona from Lee's Ferry to the confluence with the Little Colorado River, which marks the beginning of the Grand Canyon.

Lee's Ferry is a common launching point for river runners starting their journey through Marble Canyon and then onward to the Grand Canyon. Marble Canyon is also known for the Navajo Bridge, where US Highway 89A crosses the Colorado River.

The canyon marks the western boundary of the Navajo Nation. In 1975, the former Marble Canyon National Monument, which followed the Colorado River northeast from the Grand Canyon to Lee's Ferry, was made part of Grand Canyon National Park.

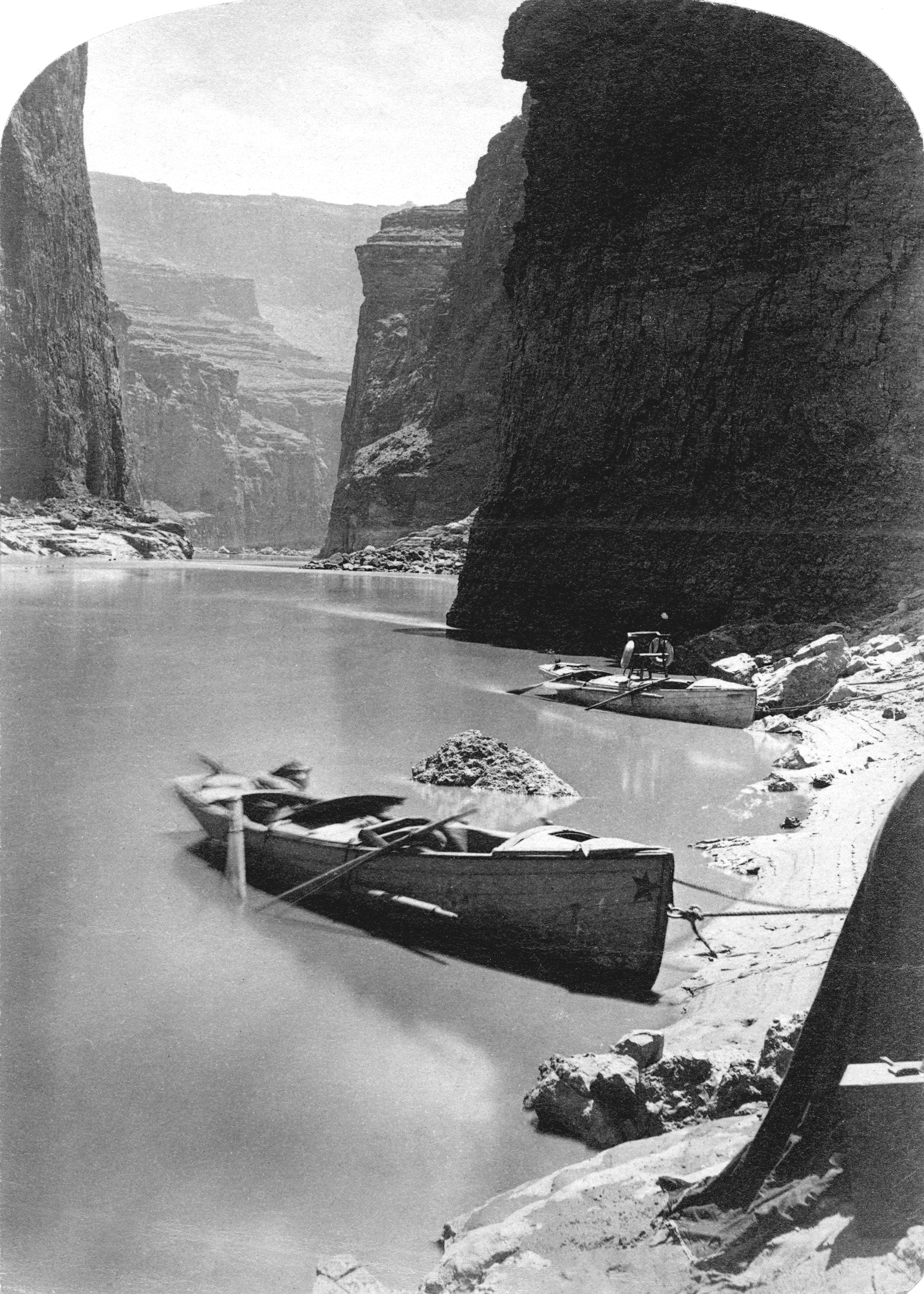
John Wesley Powell's second expedition on a noon-day rest in Marble Canyon

The name Marble Canyon is a misnomer, because there is no marble there. Although John Wesley Powell knew this when he named the canyon, he thought the polished limestone looked like marble. In his words, "The limestone of the canyon is often polished, and makes a beautiful marble. Sometimes the rocks are of many colors – white, gray, pink, and purple, with saffron tints."

Marble Canyon is the site of one of the last great proposed dam projects on the Colorado, the Marble Canyon Dam. Investigated in the early 1950s by the United States Bureau of Reclamation, the proposal met substantial opposition, notably from the Sierra Club, when a revived proposal was considered by the state of Arizona as part of the Central Arizona Project from 1965 to 1968. The proposed dam was finally abandoned in 1968. Exploratory holes, which were drilled in the Redwall Limestone of the canyon walls in an early phase of the abortive project, can still be seen at Mile 39.2.

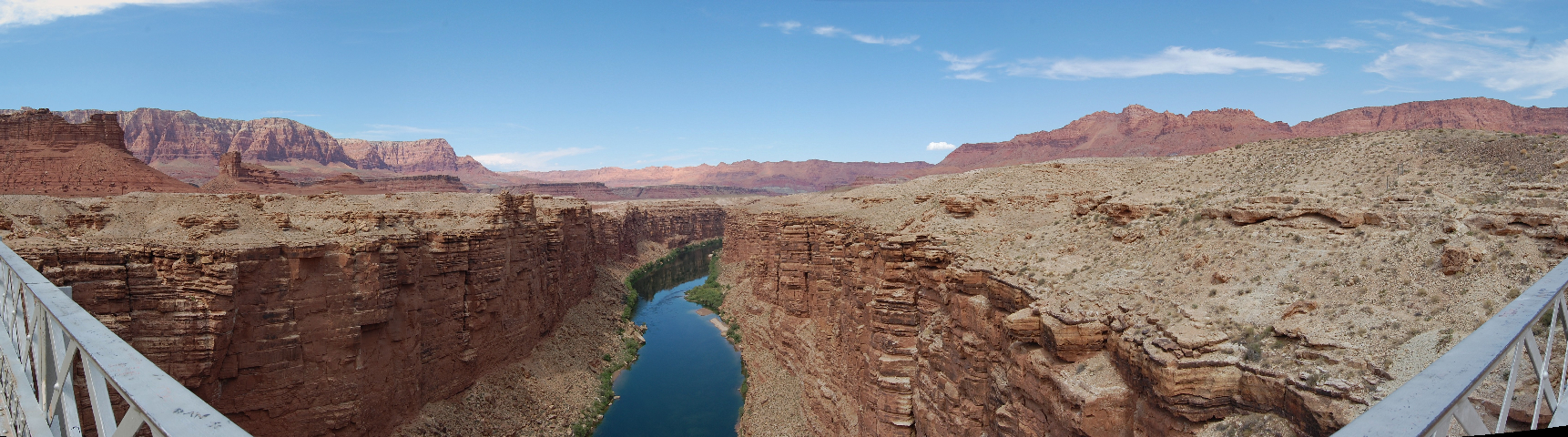
A panoramic view of Marble Canyon from Navajo Bridge

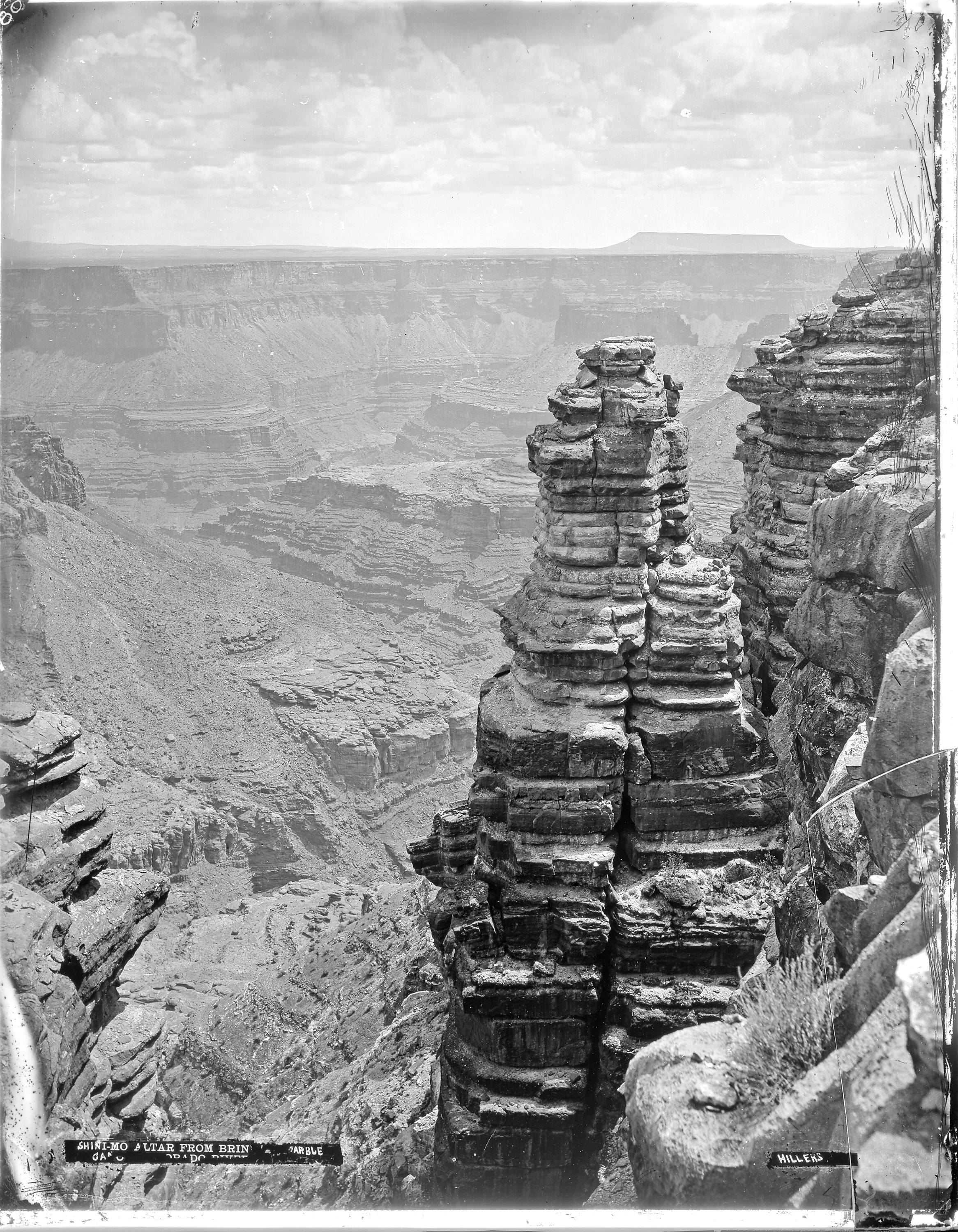
Looking into Marble Canyon, Shinumo Altar in the distance

== Geology ==
The uppermost walls of Marble Canyon are composed of Kaibab Limestone upon the Toroweap Formation upon Coconino Sandstone.

== Ecology ==
Marble Canyon is the only home of the endangered cactus Pediocactus bradyi. The critically endangered California condor also occurs in the canyon.
