= Lees Ferry =

Historical Colorado River ferry crossing

Coordinates: 36°52′03″N 111°35′43″W

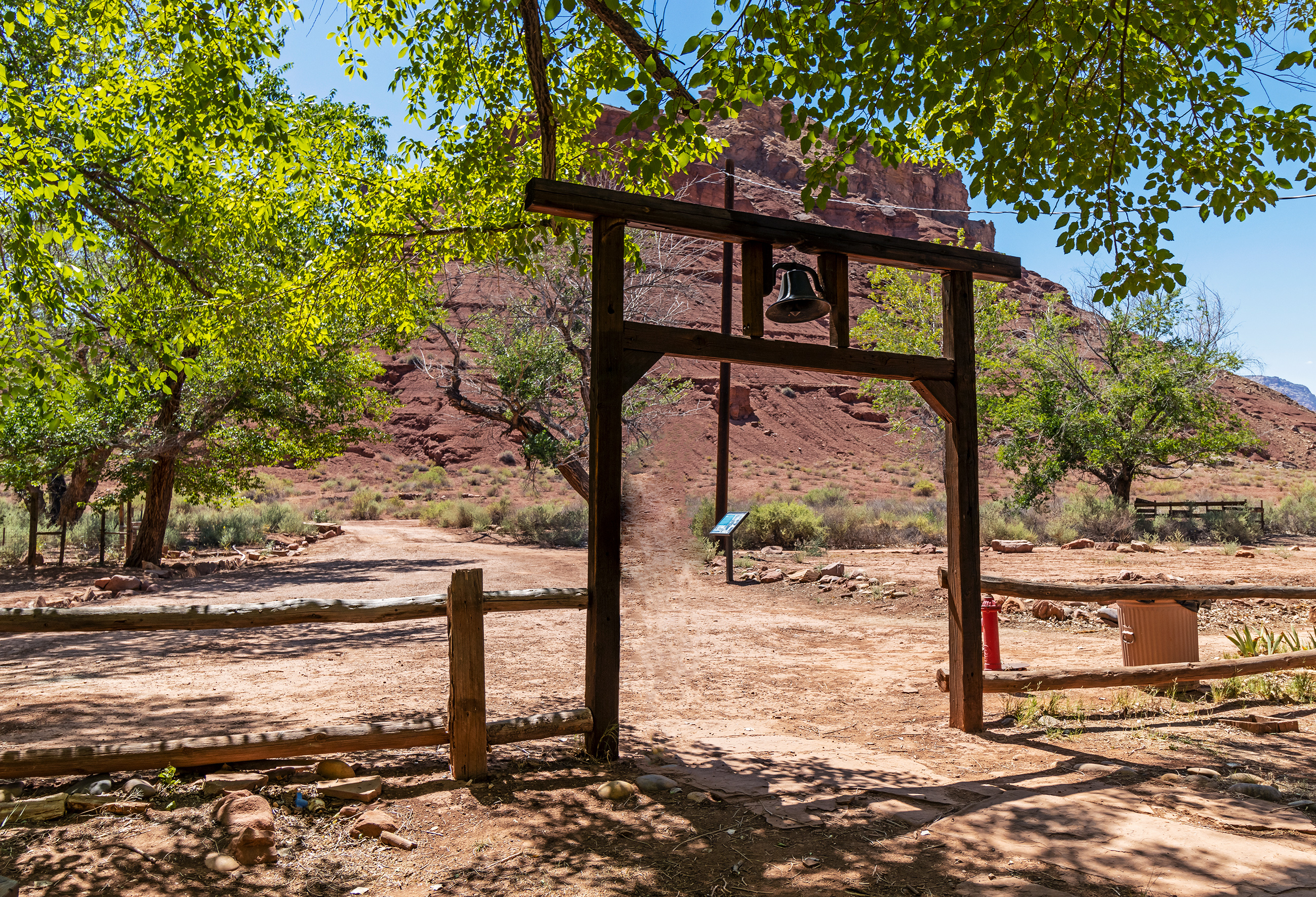
Lonely Dell Ranch at Lee's Ferry Recreation Area,

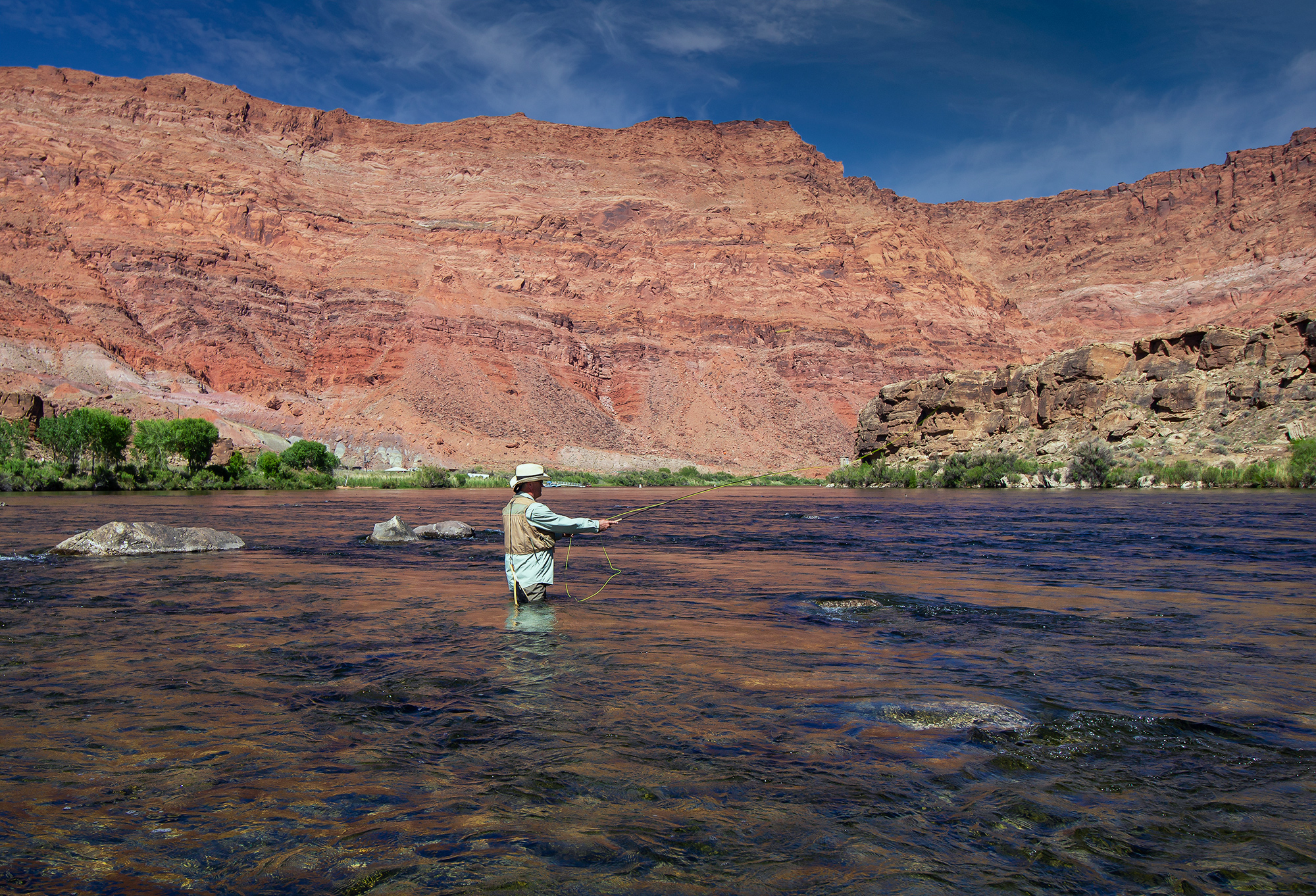
Man fly-fishing on the Colorado River at Lees Ferry, AZ

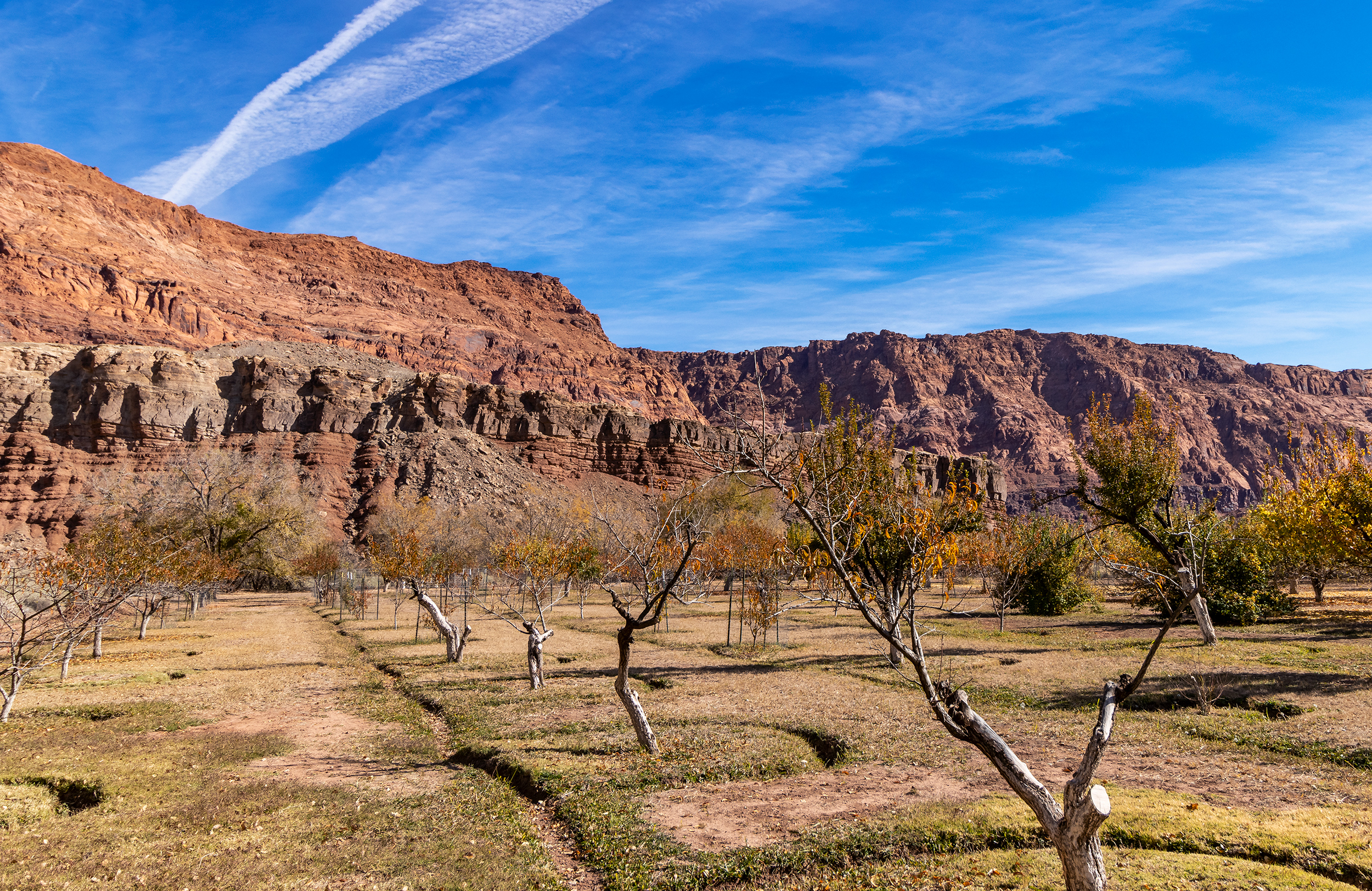
Historic desert fruit orchard at Lee's Ferry Recreation Area.

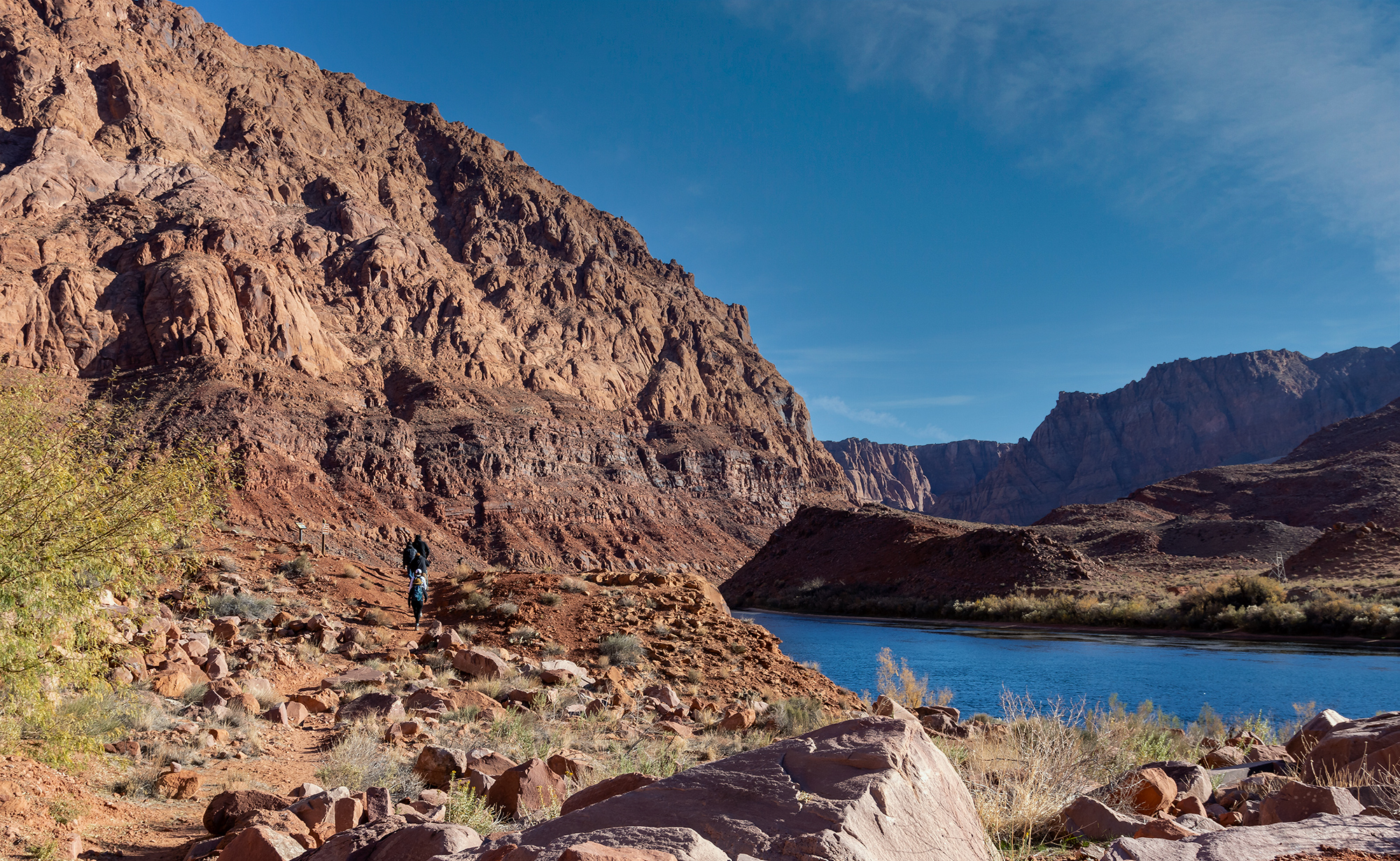
Hiking trail along the Colorado River at Lee's Ferry Recreation Area.

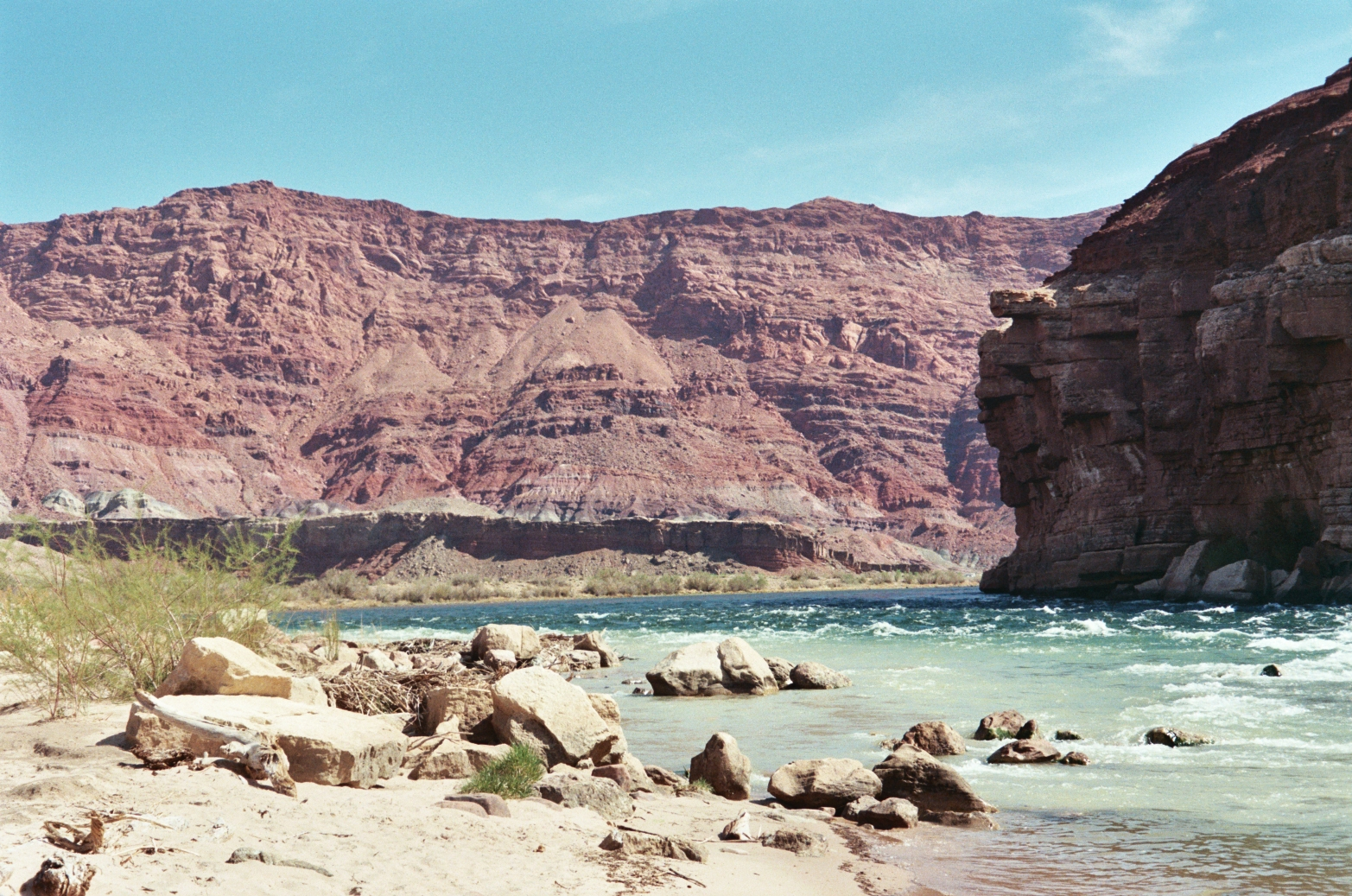
View of the Colorado River from Lees Ferry

Location of Lees Ferry in Arizona

Lees Ferry (also known as Lee's Ferry, Lee Ferry, Little Colorado Station and Saints Ferry) is a site on the Colorado River in Coconino County, Arizona in the United States, about 7.5 miles (12.1 km) southwest of Page and 9 miles (14 km) south of the Utah–Arizona state line.

Due to its unique geography – the only place in hundreds of miles from which one can easily access the Colorado River from both sides – it historically served as an important river crossing and starting in the mid-19th century was the site of a ferry operated by John Doyle Lee, for whom it is named. Boat service at Lees Ferry continued for over 55 years before being superseded by a bridge in the early 20th century, which allowed for much more efficient automobile travel.

Lees Ferry served as a military outpost for 19th-century settlements in Utah, a center of limited gold seeking and since the 1920s the principal point at which river flow is measured to determine water allocations in the 246,000-square-mile (640,000 km^{2}) Colorado River basin. Lees Ferry demarcates the boundary between the Upper and Lower Basins of the Colorado River; the states which make up each basin are legally allocated one-half of the river's natural flow. Glen Canyon Dam impounds the Colorado a short distance upstream and completely regulates the river flow past Lees Ferry. Lees Ferry has long been a focal point of American Southwest water disputes, and has been called "both the physical and spiritual heart of water history in the arid West". Lees Ferry is also a well-known fishing and boat launching point, including for whitewater rafting trips through the Grand Canyon.

== Geography and geology ==
Lees Ferry is located in northern Arizona, at the point where the Paria River joins the Colorado from the north. Lying in an open valley directly downstream from Glen Canyon and shortly above Marble Canyon (the uppermost section of the Grand Canyon), it is the only place in more than 260 miles (420 km) where the Colorado is not hemmed in by sheer canyon walls. This made it an important crossing point before the construction of Navajo and Glen Canyon Bridges in the 20th century. Here, the Colorado River is also much smoother and calmer than the stretches that lie above and below. In the past, another crossing was the former Glen Canyon reach, but it is now flooded under Lake Powell, formed by Glen Canyon Dam 16 miles (26 km) upstream. Lees Ferry is designated within the southwesternmost extreme of Glen Canyon National Recreation Area and is considered the northernmost end of Grand Canyon National Park. It lies 689 miles (1,109 km) upstream of the Colorado's mouth at the Gulf of California, at the approximate halfway mark of the river's length.

The surrounding valley formed because of a swell in the underlying rock of the Colorado Plateau that caused the regional elevation to intersect the Chinle and Moenkopi Formations, deposited in the Triassic about 208–245 million years ago. This area contains sandstone, siltstone, shale and limestone formed by the sediments on ancient seabeds and later alluvial deposits made by the Colorado and Paria Rivers. Because these are more easily eroded than the rock layers that lie above and below them, the Colorado Plateau gradually slopes down to river level at Lees Ferry through a series of flat benchlands.

== History ==
=== Early inhabitants and explorers ===
In pre-Columbian times, the Lees Ferry area was inhabited first by Paleo-Indians, who populated the region beginning about 11,500 years ago, followed by the Archaic culture, which appeared on the Colorado Plateau about 8,000 years ago. The Anasazi, Paiute and Navajo peoples, who left more evidence of habitation in the valley, arrived only in the last 1,000 years or so. Evidence, including the discovery of two ruins nearby on the Paria River, suggests that the Anasazi utilized the area sometime in the 12th century A.D. Nonetheless, indigenous peoples generally did not make extensive use of the Lees Ferry area and other canyon stretches of the Colorado River, preferring the open plains above for hunting. However, Lees Ferry did later become a disputed territory between the Navajos and Paiutes, who recognized it as a valuable livestock watering point.

The first Europeans who happened upon Lees Ferry were members of the 18th-century Domínguez–Escalante expedition, an attempt to find an overland route through the Southwest between Spanish settlements in present-day New Mexico and California, and in the process, to convert as many Southwestern Native Americans as possible to Christianity. In late 1776, the party ran out of supplies in what is now southern Utah and having decided to turn back towards Santa Fe, had to find a way to cross the Colorado River. Their Native American guides told them of two regional fords of the river, one at the site of Lees Ferry and the other at Glen Canyon. When the explorers arrived at Lees Ferry in October, they found the river too wide and deep and had no choice but to head for the second ford more than 40 miles (60 km) upstream. Almost two weeks later they successfully crossed the river, and made it back to Santa Fe on January 2, 1777. This point, now submerged under Lake Powell, is named Crossing of the Fathers after Francisco Atanasio Domínguez and Silvestre Vélez de Escalante, the two Franciscan priests who headed the expedition.

During the 19th century, Lees Ferry served as a gateway for the expansion of settlement from Utah south into Arizona. Most of the settlers were Mormons, who had been long established in the Utah Valley near present-day Salt Lake City, and were looking for additional land. Although the river at Lee's Ferry is too deep to ford for most of the year, its relatively calm current presented an attractive site for crossing by boat. Jacob Hamblin successfully crossed the river here in 1864, and during the next few years the Mormon presence swelled to the scale of a small military outpost (Lee's Ferry Fort) in order to defend against Navajo raids. However, these works eventually fell into disrepair as a result of not being able to sustain themselves in the valley.

=== John D. Lee and the ferry (1870–1876) ===
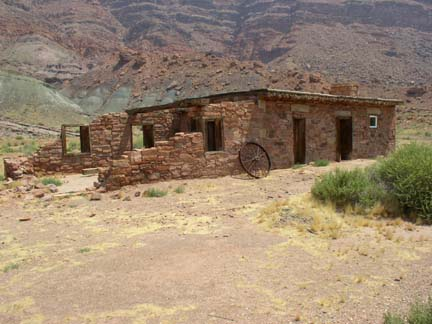
One of the surviving buildings at Lonely Dell, the settlement established by John D. Lee at Lees Ferry in 1870

John D. Lee, for whom Lees Ferry is now named, came to the crossing in 1870 with the goal of setting up a permanent ferry service for Mormon settlers heading south to Arizona. In 1857, Lee had taken part in the Mountain Meadows Massacre, in which a group of Mormons and Native Americans attacked a passing non-Mormon wagon train from Arkansas, killing about 120 people. The ill-conceived attack was the result of several factors including hysteria surrounding the 1857 "Utah War" and animosity toward Arkansans after the murder of Mormon apostle Parley P. Pratt near Van Buren, Arkansas. Years after the massacre, Lee moved to the remote Colorado River crossing to take refuge from the law.

Lee arrived in September with two of his wives and his children, and created a small settlement named Lonely Dell. The ferry was formally established in January 1873, with the launching of the Colorado, the first of many boats that would ply the treacherous and fluctuating river at this point. The location of the ferry upstream from the Paria River confluence required passengers to traverse a dangerous incline nicknamed "Lee's Backbone" on their ascent up the south wall of the valley. Four years later, Lee was finally arrested by the U.S. government and tried for his role in the massacre. Found guilty, he was executed by firing squad at Mountain Meadows on March 28, 1877. He was the only participant in the massacre to be tried and executed out of the over fifty men who had participated.

=== 1877–1929 ===
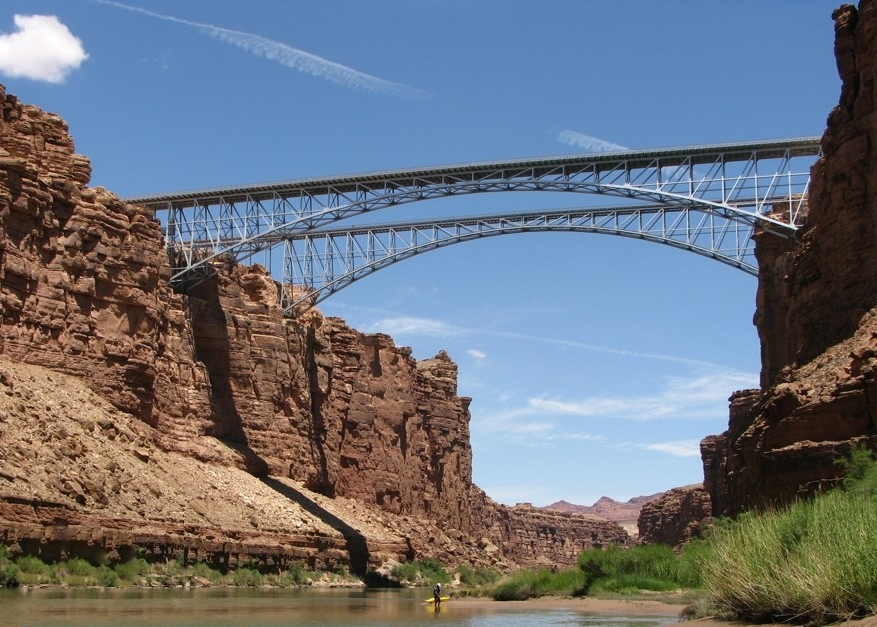
Standing 467 feet (142 m) above the river, the original Navajo Bridge (rear) superseded ferry operations at Lees Ferry in 1929. The second bridge was built in 1995 to accommodate modern traffic load requirements.

After Lee's death, his wife Emma continued to operate the ferry for two years, in 1878 establishing an alternative ferry route below the confluence of the Paria River that allowed travelers to avoid the infamous Lee's Backbone segment. However, this route could not be used in the summer months due to dangerous high water levels from snowmelt. In 1879, the LDS Church bought the ferry and transferred its operation to Warren Marshall Johnson and his family. In 1896 the ferry was transferred to Jim Emett, who installed a cable across the Colorado River to reduce the risk of boats washing downstream during high water.

During this time, Lees Ferry and the surrounding area attracted people because of a series of gold strikes in southern Utah, beginning with Cass Hite, a prospector who discovered gold in Glen Canyon in 1883. Gold seekers came to the area as early as 1889, when two Mormon prospectors by the names of Holladay and Huntington began to explore the surrounds of Lees Ferry. The most extravagant investment was a full-scale mining operation led by Charles H. Spencer, head of the American Placer Company, who came to Lees Ferry in 1910 planning to extract gold from the Chinle Formation. Spencer brought in tons of equipment including a 92-foot (28 m) steamboat, the Charles H. Spencer, reputedly the largest vessel ever to float the Colorado River upstream of the Grand Canyon. The operation was a dismal failure, and Spencer left, broke, in 1912. The steamboat sank in 1921 and now lies in pieces along the Colorado from Glen Canyon to below Lees Ferry.

The ferry continued to run until 1928. In 1929 the first Navajo Bridge was completed at a location 4 miles (6.4 km) downstream and allowed for far more efficient road travel between Utah and Arizona. Somewhat ironically, the ferry was instrumental in transporting materials for the bridge until June 1928, when the ferryboat capsized, drowning three men and dumping a Ford Model T. The ferry was never replaced, and the bridge was completed seven months later, relegating Lees Ferry from a crowded transportation hub to a quiet backwater.

== Water rights ==
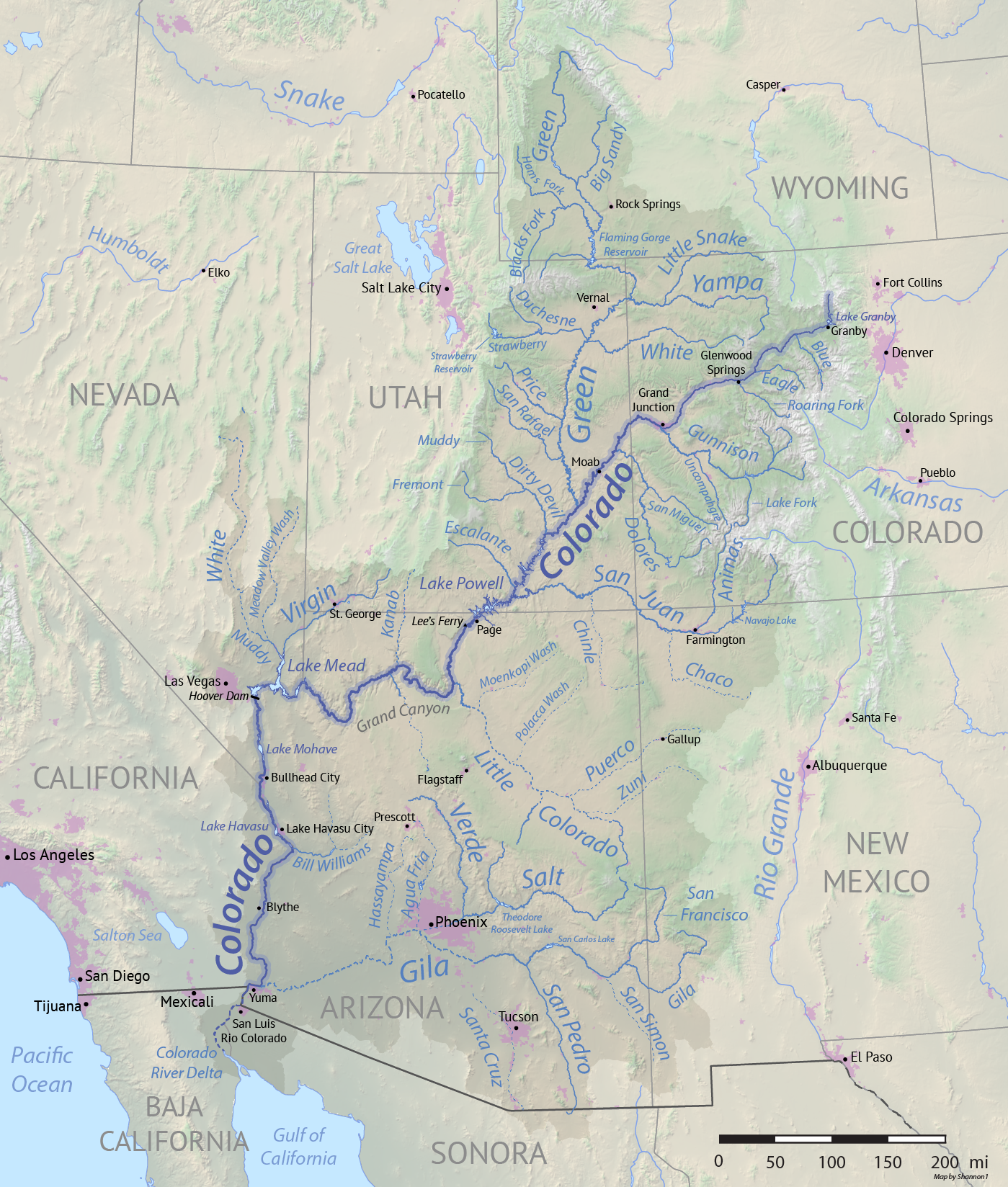
Map showing the Colorado River basin and some of its major reservoirs; Lees Ferry (slightly left of center) is located directly below Page, Arizona and Lake Powell.

Since August 1921, Lees Ferry has been the site of a stream gage operated by the U.S. Geological Survey and has since accumulated one of the most extensive streamflow records ever made in the United States. The river flow here is the principal factor in allocating water to the seven U.S. and two Mexican states in the Colorado River basin. The Colorado River Compact of 1922 apportioned an equal portion of the river's flow to the Upper Basin (the U.S. states of Colorado, New Mexico, Utah, Wyoming and northern Arizona) and the Lower Basin (Arizona, California and Nevada), with the individual "basins" divided by an imaginary line at Lees Ferry.

Total allocations, including a later 1944 treaty with Mexico guaranteeing that country most of the remaining water in the river, ran up to 16,500,000 acre-feet (20.4 km^{3}; 4.88 cu mi) which was believed to be the natural flow of the Colorado River based on early observations at Lees Ferry and other gages along the river. To fully utilize these allocations and prevent water from "wasting" to the ocean, the U.S. federal government constructed a number of large storage dams on the Colorado River system. The canyon country around Lees Ferry was considered for the site of the first dam, but was abandoned in favor of a site lower on the Colorado, where Hoover Dam was completed in 1936. In the 1960s, the area was again investigated as part of the U.S. Bureau of Reclamation's Colorado River Storage Project, and that assessment culminated in the construction of Glen Canyon Dam in 1966. The filling of the resulting Lake Powell of 24,300,000 acre-feet (30.0 km^{3}; 7.19 cu mi) inundated the Crossing of the Fathers, Charles Spencer's old mining operation, and other historic landmarks of the area. Flood control at Glen Canyon also smoothed out the seasonal flux of the Colorado River that so beleaguered the ferry operations at Lees Ferry in the past.

Lees Ferry has long been a focal point of American Southwest water disputes, and has been called "both the physical and spiritual heart of water history in the arid West". From the 1940s onward, Colorado River flows were found to average significantly less than what was allocated under the two treaties, and 21st century studies have postulated that the actual sustainable flow past Lees Ferry is between 13,500,000 and 14,700,000 acre-feet (16.7 and 18.1 km^{3}; 4.00 and 4.35 cu mi), creating water supply issues for the river basin.

== Lees Ferry today ==
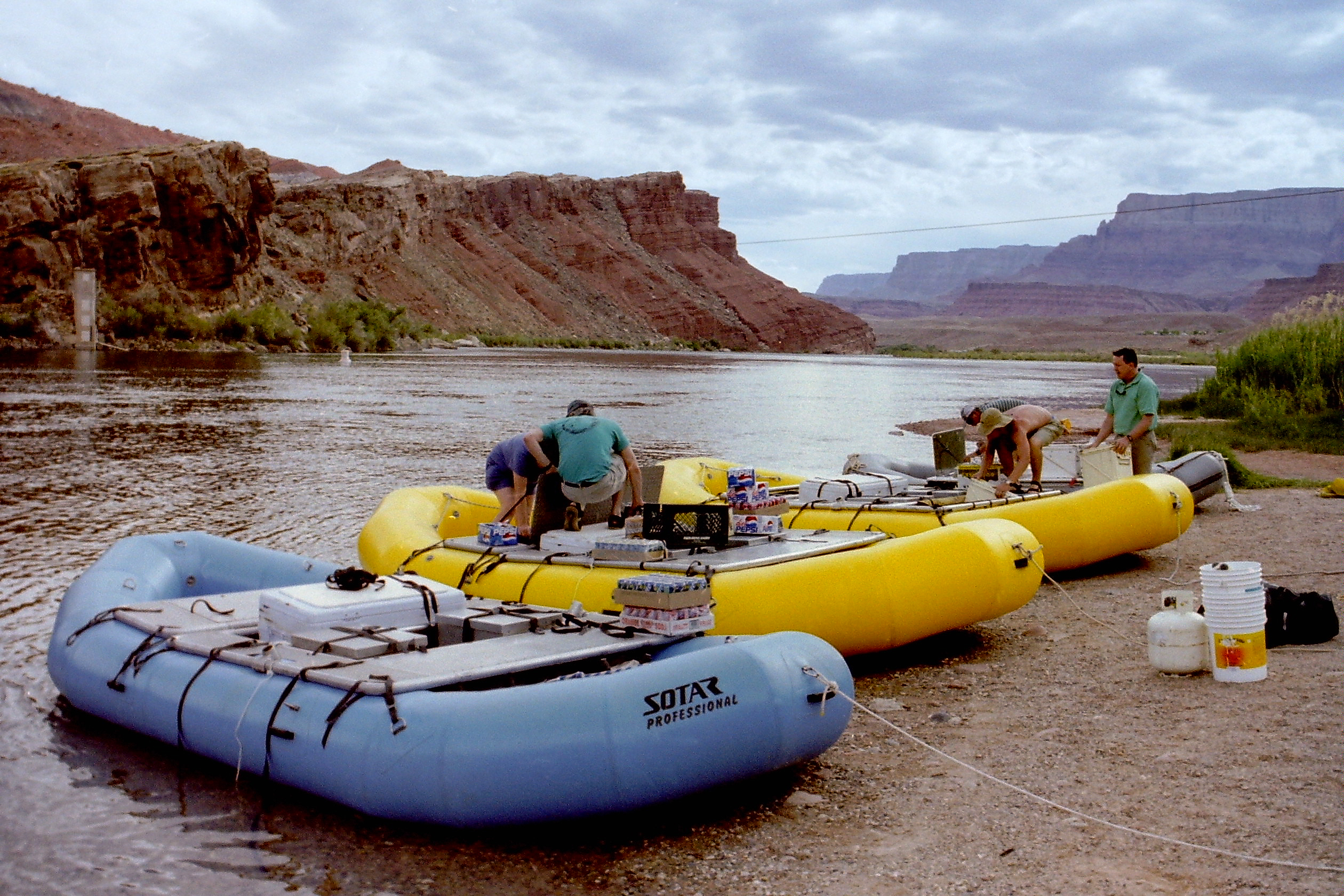
Inflatable rafts lined up for launch at Lee's Ferry

Lees Ferry is considered the official beginning of Grand Canyon National Park on the Colorado River and is used as a fishing area and river rafting launch site. The main access is by Lees Ferry Road, which splits off from U.S. Route 89A at the hamlet of Marble Canyon, Arizona, on the west side of the Navajo Bridges. The Lonely Dell Ranch Historic District, listed on the National Register of Historic Places in 1978 and expanded to include Lees Ferry in 1997, features several buildings built during and after John D. Lee's brief tenure at the site along with some remnants of the Charles H. Spencer. A small historical cemetery is located nearby. The area is managed by the National Park Service within the Glen Canyon National Recreation Area as a historical site.

Lees Ferry is the principal starting point for whitewater rafting trips through the Grand Canyon, which are said to offer "a trip backwards through time" as the river cuts through progressively older strata. The majority of trips are run by commercial rafting enterprises using both paddle and motorized inflatable rafts to carry large parties of tourists (up to 24 passengers per raft) on the river with most trips lasting from one week to ten days. Some trips travel all the way to Lake Mead, 277 miles (446 km) downstream, and can last several weeks. Permits for private trips are no longer backlogged on an extensive waiting list, but instead are now based on a lottery system. All but the most experienced rapid runners are discouraged from this potentially dangerous trip.

Trips upstream from the nearby Paria Riffle may be made without special permit (other than a day use boating fee) and users may travel 16 miles (26 km) upstream on calm waters to the foot of Glen Canyon Dam. This reach of the Colorado River is also well known for its status as a Blue Ribbon fishery, thanks to releases of cold, clear water from Glen Canyon Dam that make conditions ideal for introduced rainbow trout. While the river here has been stocked with rainbows since 1964, the implementation of a more stable flow regime at Glen Canyon Dam in 1991 has somewhat reduced the average size of fish caught there due to the increased survival rate of young fish and the resulting competition.

Lees Ferry is also the ending point for backpacking and canyoneering trips down the Paria River, which features historic petroglyphs, slot canyons, waterfalls and natural bridges including Wrather Arch, the longest such formation in the U.S. outside of Utah.

Fishing is an especially important part of the local recreational use of Lees Ferry drawing thousands of anglers a year seeking large trout. In given year there are possible world record fish available in the Glen Canyon Dam area.

=== In film ===
Irvin Willat and a cast and crew of 200 people used Lees Ferry during the filming of The Heritage of the Desert, released in 1924. Lee's Ferry is also mentioned as one of the stops in the film Stagecoach (1939).

Scenes from the movie Into the Wild (based on the book by Jon Krakauer) were shot on location in 2006 at the Lees Ferry National Park Service Station, which featured actors Emile Hirsch as Christopher McCandless and Steven Wiig as the Lees Ferry Ranger, Steve Koehler.

In the second season of "Here's Lucy" episode four 'Lucy runs the rapids' filmed on location at Lee's Ferry.

== See also ==
- Lee's Ferry and Lonely Dell Ranch
- The Church of Jesus Christ of Latter-day Saints in Arizona
- Vermilion Cliffs

== Works cited ==
- DeBuys, William E. (2011). A Great Aridness: Climate Change and the Future of the American Southwest. Oxford University Press. ISBN 978-0-19-977892-8.

== External links and further reading ==
- Rusho, W. L.; Crampton, C. Gregory (1981) [1928]. Desert River Crossing: Historic Lee's Ferry on the Colorado River (second revised printing ed.). Salt Lake City: Peregrine Smith, Inc. ISBN 0-87905-048-9.
- Historic American Buildings Survey (HABS) No. AZ-58, "Lee's Ferry, U.S. Route Alternate 89, Page vicinity, Coconino County, AZ"
- U.S. Geological Survey real time streamflow data at Lee's Ferry
- Arizona Boating Locations Facilities Map
- National Park Service, Glen Canyon National Recreation Area, Lees Ferry
