= Stevens Arch =

Natural rock arch in Kane County, Utah, US

- Rock arch
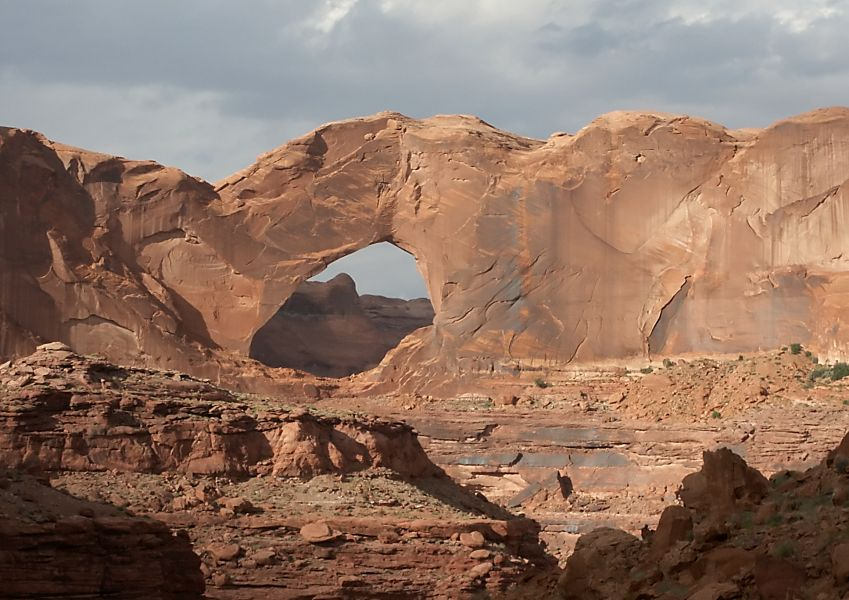
- View of the arch

- Location in Utah Location in Utah
- Coordinates: 37°26′02″N 110°58′46″W
- Location: Kane County, Utah, United States

Dimensions
  - Length: 220 ft (67 m)
  - Height: 160 ft (49 m)

Stevens Arch is a large natural arch located in Grand Staircase–Escalante National Monument, Utah. The bridge has a span of 220 feet (67.06 metres), making it the fourteenth longest natural arch span in the United States as measured by the Natural Arch and Bridge Society.

== Access ==
Stevens Arch can be accessed via an 8-mile round trip hike with a total elevation gain of about 1500 feet (457.2 m).

== Geology ==
The arch comprises Navajo Sandstone and stands above the Escalante River. The arch is located in Escalante Canyon at its junction with Stevens Canyon, just upstream from Coyote Gulch.
