= Mormonism Unveiled =

Book by John D. Lee

- First edition
- Editor: William W. Bishop
- Author: John D. Lee
- Original title: Mormonism Unveiled; or The Life and Confessions of the Late Mormon Bishop, John D. Lee (Written by Himself)
- Language: English
- Subject: LDS Church, Brigham Young, Mountain Meadows massacre
- Publisher: Bryan, Brand & Company (St. Louis)
- Publication date: 1877
- Publication place: United States
- ISBN: 0826327885

Mormonism Unveiled; or The Life and Confessions of the Late Mormon Bishop, John D. Lee (Written by Himself) is a book by John D. Lee, first published in 1877, just after the author's execution for his complicity in the Mountain Meadows massacre. It was dictated to, and edited by, Lee's attorney, William W. Bishop.

The book was composed between Lee's second trial (with its subsequent conviction) and his execution. It includes Lee's autobiography up until 1847, his confession to Bishop, the transcript of the 1876 trial, an account of Lee's death by firing squad, and a biographical sketch of Brigham Young. Lee portrays himself as a true believer who was set up as a scapegoat by Young and other church leaders.

Some details have been brought into question, if they were not Lee's words, but rather inserted by the editor.

The book was out of print for almost a century.
