= Wrather Arch =

Geologic feature in Coconino County, Arizona

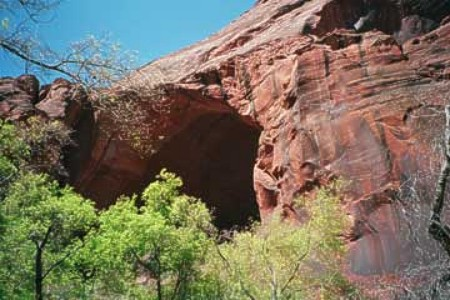
- View of the arch

- Location within Arizona Location within the United States
- Location: Paria Canyon-Vermilion Cliffs Wilderness, Arizona, United States
- Nearest city: Page
- Coordinates: 36°57′53″N 111°46′46″W
- Length: 180 ft (55 m)
- Elevation: 165 ft (50 m)

Wrather Arch is a cave type natural arch in the Paria Canyon-Vermilion Cliffs Wilderness, in Coconino County, northern Arizona. The sandstone arch is located in the eponymous Wrather Canyon, a short side canyon of Paria Canyon. The Paria River is a tributary of the Colorado River, at its confluence down−canyon at Lee's Ferry. Wrather Arch was first spotted by a local pilot from Page, Arizona, Royce K Knight, as he flew over a remote gorge west of Glen Canyon. Reaching the arch by helicopter in 1963, Knight and National Geographic staff man Walter M Edwards calculated its height as 165 feet and about 250 feet across. A news bulletin from National Geographic dated February 4, 1966 states, "Tall as a 15 story building, Wrather Arch (named for a past National Geographic Trustee)... The Taj Mahal would fit comfortably into the arch..."

== Length ==
Wrather Arch was once thought to be the longest natural arch span outside of the state of Utah, originally reported to be 246 feet (75 m) in span. The recent discovery of longer arches in China, Afghanistan, and Chad; and a shortening of its estimated length by the Natural Arch and Bridge Society – NABS, have taken Wrather Arch off their "largest arches over 200 feet in span list." Recent NABS assessments estimate the span has an approximate length of 180 feet (55 m).

== Access ==
Wrather Arch is distinguished as being the least accessible among the major natural spans in the Southwestern United States. It is located in the heart of the Paria Canyon-Vermilion Cliffs Wilderness area, and can only be accessed with a permit by the Paria Canyon Trail. Being located near the midway point of the hiking trail, visitors must walk around 18 miles (29 km) to reach and see Wrather Arch.

== See also ==
- Vermilion Cliffs
- Vermilion Cliffs National Monument
- Lee's Ferry and Lonely Dell Ranch
