= Navajo Bridge =

Bridge pair in Arizona, United States

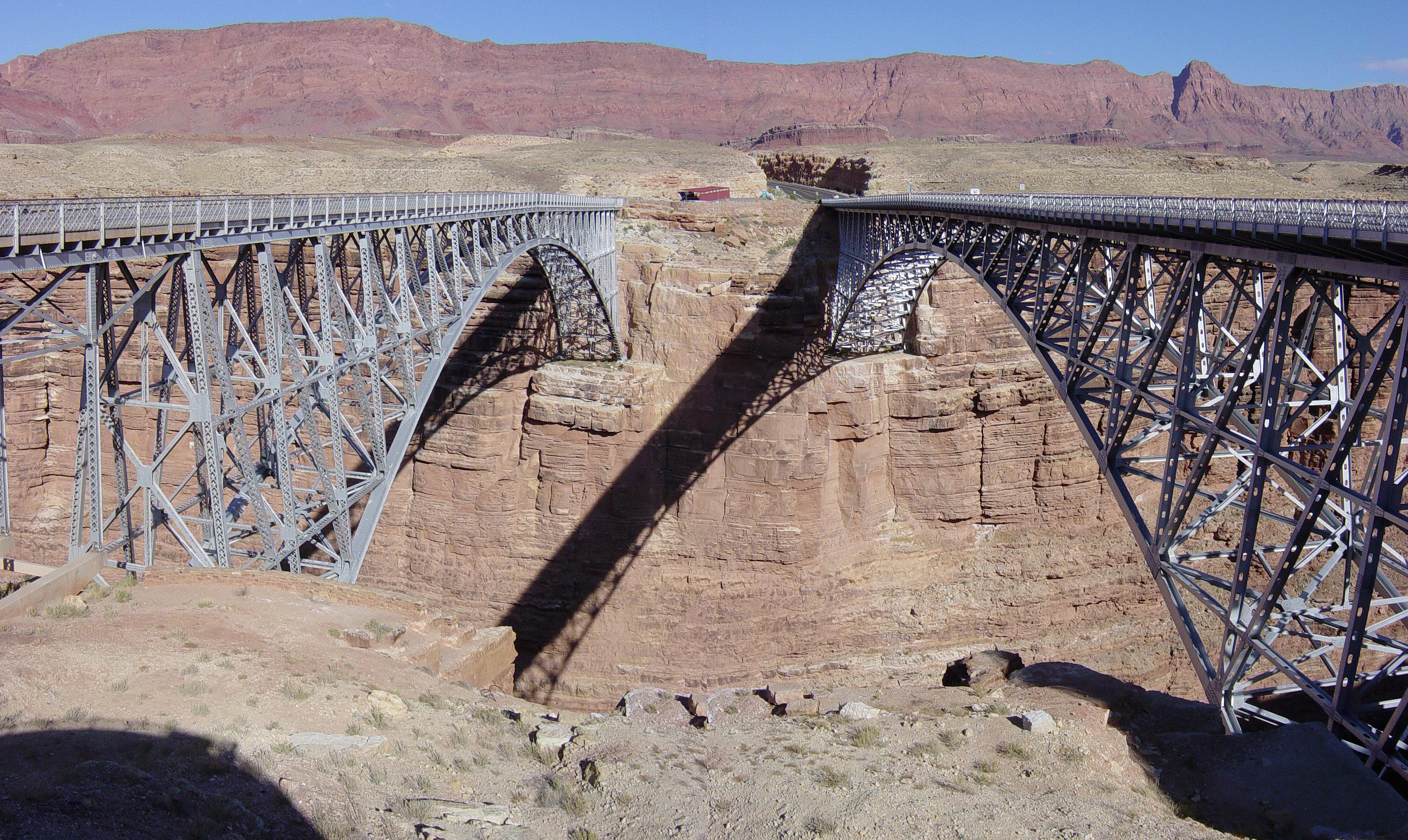
- Looking east, with 1929 bridge at left, 1995 bridge at right, and the Echo Cliffs in the background, May 2006
- Coordinates: 36°49′04″N 111°37′54″W
- Carries: US 89A 2nd only
- Crosses: Colorado River at Marble Canyon
- Locale: Marble Canyon, Arizona and Lees Ferry
- Official name: Upstream bridge: Historic Navajo Bridge, Structure No. 51 Downstream Bridge: Navajo Bridge, Structure No. 2340
- Other names: Grand Canyon Bridge; Lees Ferry Bridge; Hamblin-Hastele Bridge; Colorado River Bridge
- Named for: Navajo people
- Owner: Arizona Department of Transportation (ADOT)
- Maintained by: ADOT
- Heritage status: National Register of Historic Places 1st only
- ID number: AZ00051 1st AZ02340 2nd
- Preceded by: Glen Canyon Dam Bridge
- Followed by: Hoover Dam

Characteristics
- Design: open-spandrel arch bridge with 90 feet (27 m) rise (both)
- Material: Steel
- Total length: 834 feet (254 m) 1st 909 feet (277 m) 2nd
- Width: 18 feet (5.5 m) 1st 44 feet (13 m) 2nd
- Height: 476 feet (145 m)
- Longest span: 616 feet (188 m) 1st 726 feet (221 m) 2nd
- No. of spans: 1 (each bridge)
- Piers in water: 0
- Load limit: 22.5 short tons (20.4 t) 1st
- Clearance below: 467 feet (142 m) 1st 470 feet (140 m) 2nd

History
- Construction start: June 1927 (1st); May 1993 (2nd)
- Construction end: 1929 (1st); 1995 (2nd)
- Construction cost: $US 390,000 1st (equivalent to $5.6 million in 2024 dollars) $US 14.7 million 2nd
- Opened: January 12, 1929 (1st); May 2, 1995 (2nd)

Statistics
- Navajo Steel Arch Highway Bridge
- U.S. National Register of Historic Places
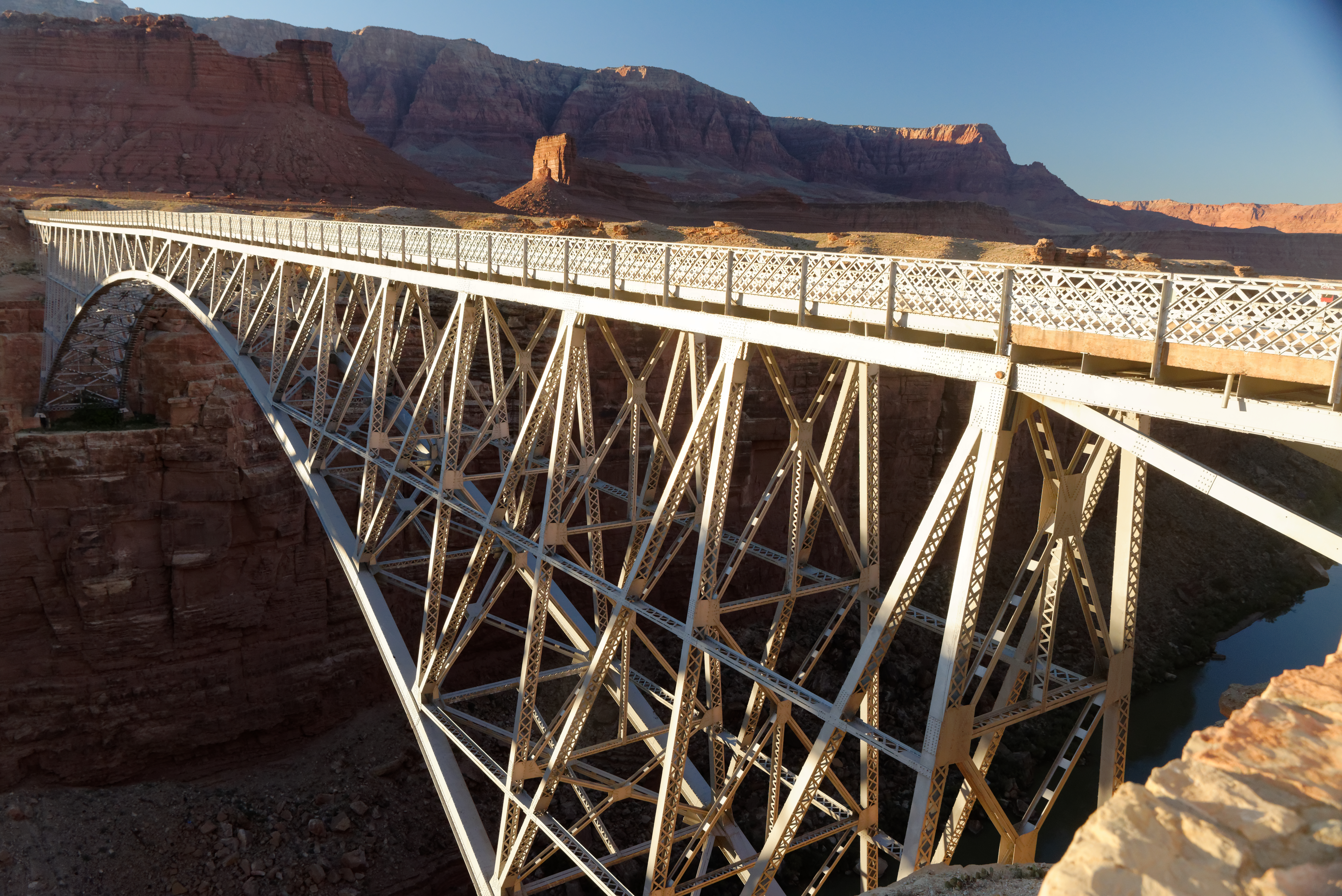
- The 1929, NRHP listed bridge, October 2018
- Nearest city: Page
- Coordinates: 36°49′2″N 111°37′53″W
- Built: 1929
- Architect: Arizona Highway Department
- MPS: Vehicular Bridges in Arizona MPS
- NRHP reference No.: 81000134
- Added to NRHP: August 13, 1981

Location
- Interactive map of Navajo Bridge

Navajo Bridge is the name of twin steel spandrel arch bridges that cross the Colorado River in the Grand Canyon National Park (Note: While the Navajo Bridges are officially located in the Grand Canyon National Park, the actual location is a little more complicated. The southeast approach to the bridges is located within the Navajo Nation, which was originally established in 1868 and had its boundaries extended west to the east rim of Marble Canyon prior to the construction of the first bridge in 1928. The northwest approach to the bridges is located within the Glen Canyon National Recreation Area, having been established in 1972 (well after the construction of the first bridge, but a few decades prior to the construction of the second). The bridges themselves span Marble Canyon. In 1965 the Marble Canyon National Monument was established and included the section of the Colorado River between the canyon rims from the (then) northeastern boundary of the Grand Canyon National Park (which was established in 1919) to Lees Ferry. However, in 1975, the entirety of the Marble Canyon National Monument was added to the Grand Canyon National Park.) (near Lees Ferry) in northern Coconino County, Arizona, United States. The newer of the two spans carries vehicular traffic on U.S. Route 89A (US 89A) over Marble Canyon between Bitter Springs and Jacob Lake, allowing travel into a remote Arizona Strip region north of the Colorado River including the North Rim of Grand Canyon National Park.

Prior to completion of the first Navajo Bridge, one of the only Colorado River crossings between Arizona and Utah was located about 5 miles (8.0 km) upstream from the bridge site, at the mouth of Glen Canyon where Lees Ferry service had operated since 1873. The ferry site had been chosen as the only relatively easy access to the river for both northbound and southbound travelers. By the 1920s, automobile traffic began using the ferry, though it was not considered a safe and reliable crossing due to adverse weather and flooding regularly preventing its operation.

The bridge was officially named the Grand Canyon Bridge when it was dedicated on June 14–15, 1929. The state legislature changed the name to Navajo Bridge five years later in 1934. The original bridge was closed to vehicular traffic after the new span opened in 1995. The old span is still open for pedestrian and equestrian use.

The dual spans of Navajo Bridge are tied at ninth place among the highest bridges in the United States with nearly identical heights of 467 feet (142.3 m) for the original span, and 470 feet (143.3 m) for the second span.

== History ==
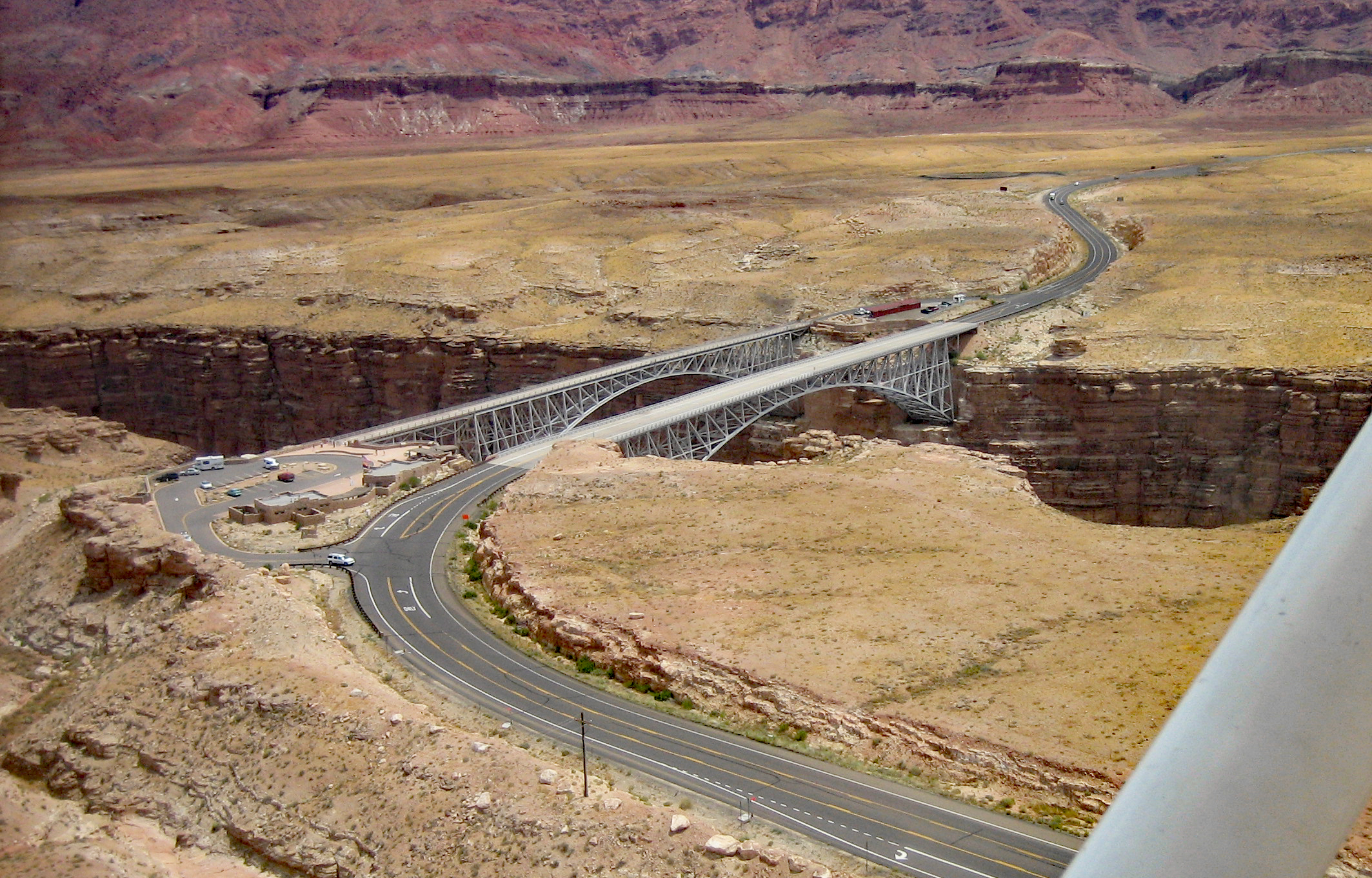
Aerial view of Navajo Bridge with the newer bridge in the foreground, July 2005

Construction of the original Navajo Bridge began in 1927, and the bridge opened to traffic in 1929. The bridge was paid for by the nascent Arizona State Highway Commission (now the Arizona Department of Transportation) in cooperation with the United States Department of the Interior's Bureau of Indian Affairs, as the eastern landing is on the Navajo Nation. The steel spandrel bridge was designed and constructed by the Kansas City Structural Steel Company. During construction, worker Lane McDaniels died after falling 467 feet (142 m) to the Colorado River below. Supervisors had rejected the idea of rigging safety netting, believing that it would catch on fire from falling hot rivets.

The original bridge is 834 feet (254 m) in length, with a maximum height of 467 feet (142 m) from the canyon floor. The roadway offers an 18-foot (5.5 m) surface width with a load capacity of 22.5 tons (although the posted legal weight limit was 40 tons). During the design phase, a wider roadway was considered, but ultimately rejected, as it would have required a costly third arch to be added to the design, and the vehicles of the time did not require a wider road. When the Bridge officially opened on January 12, 1929, the Flagstaff paper proclaimed it "the biggest news in Southwest history."

By 1984, however, Arizona Department of Transportation officials decided that the traffic flow was too great for the original bridge and that a new solution was needed. The sharp corners in the roadway on each side of the approach had become a safety hazard due to low visibility, and deficiencies resulting from the original design's width and load capacity specifications were becoming problematic. The bridge had also become part of US 89A.

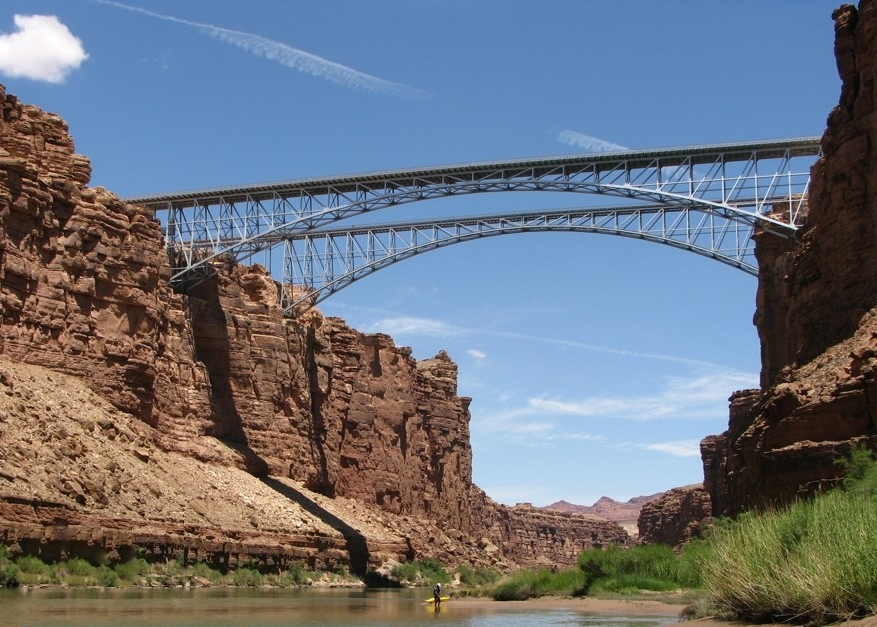
A view of the bridges and Marble Canyon from the Colorado River, September 2009

Deciding on a solution was difficult, due to the many local interests. Issues included preservation of sacred Navajo land, endangered plant species in Marble Canyon, and the possibility of construction debris entering the river. The original proposal called for merely widening and fortifying the 1928 bridge, but this was ultimately rejected as not sufficient to meet contemporary federal highway standards. Replacement became the only option, and it was eventually decided to entirely discontinue vehicular traffic on the original bridge. A new bridge would be built immediately next to the original and have a considerably similar visual appearance, but would conform to modern highway codes.

The new steel arch bridge was commissioned by the Arizona Department of Transportation and the Federal Highway Administration, and was completed in May 1995, at a cost of $14.7 million. A formal dedication was held on September 14, 1995.

The original Navajo Bridge is still open to pedestrian and equestrian use, and an interpretive center has been constructed on the west side to showcase the historical nature of the bridge and early crossing of the Colorado River. The original bridge has been designated as a Historic Civil Engineering Landmark, and was placed on the National Register of Historic Places on August 13, 1981.

California condors were reintroduced to the area in 1996 and can sometimes be seen on and around Navajo Bridge.

== Bridge characteristics ==
=== Original bridge (1929) ===
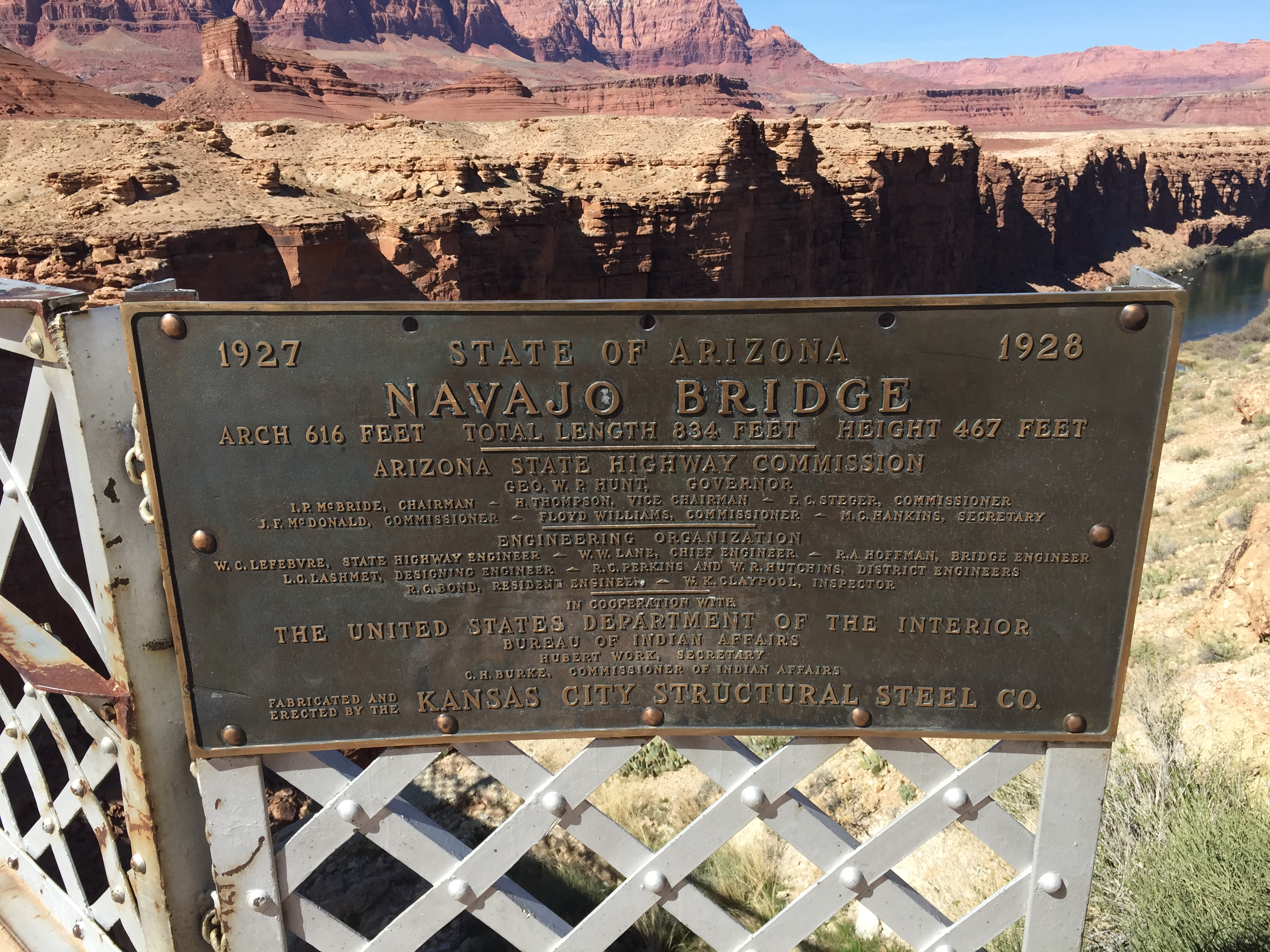
Sign on original bridge with figures, March 2016

Construction started June 30, 1927
Bridge opened to traffic January 12, 1929
Total length: 834 feet (254 m)
Steel arch length: 616 feet (188 m)
Arch rise: 90 feet (27 m)
Height above river: 467 feet (142 m)
Width of the roadway: 18 feet (5.5 m)

Amount of steel: 2,400,000 pounds (1,100,000 kg)
Amount of concrete: 500 cubic yards (382 m^{3})
Amount of steel reinforcement: 82,000 pounds (37,000 kg)

Construction cost: $390,000 (equivalent to $7.31 million in 2025)

=== New bridge (1995) ===
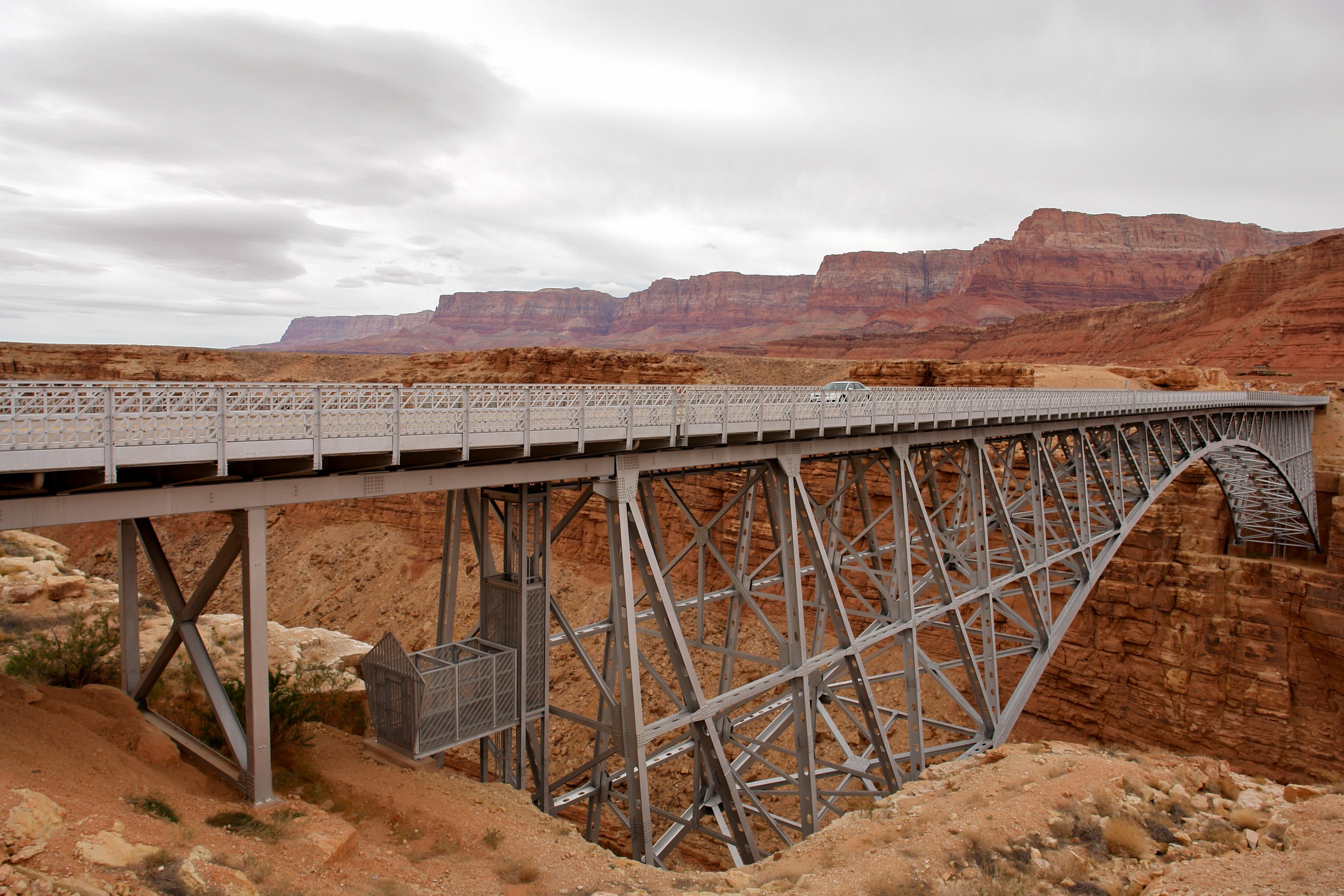
Car crossing the new Navajo Bridge (U.S. Route 89A), April 2009

Total length: 909 feet (277 m)
Steel arch length: 726 feet (221 m)
Arch rise: 90 feet (27 m)
Height above river: 470 feet (143 m)
Width of the roadway: 44 feet (13 m)

Amount of steel: 3,900,000 pounds (1,800,000 kg)
Amount of concrete: 1,790 cubic yards (1,370 m^{3})
Amount of steel reinforcement: 434,000 pounds (197,000 kg)

Construction cost $14.7 million (equivalent to $31.06 million in 2025)

== See also ==
- List of bridges documented by the Historic American Engineering Record in Arizona
- List of bridges in the United States by height
- List of bridges on the National Register of Historic Places in Arizona
- National Register of Historic Places listings in Coconino County, Arizona
