= John D. Lee =

American LDS leader and mass murderer (1812–1877)

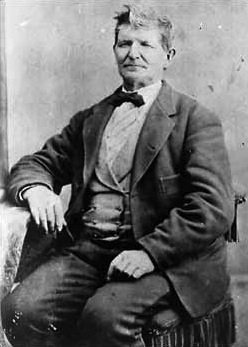

Member of the Council of Fifty
- 1844 – March 23, 1877
- Called by: Brigham Young 14 March and 11 April 1844.
- End reason: Death

Member of the Utah Territorial Legislature

In office
- 1858

Personal details
- Born: John Doyle Lee; September 6, 1812; Kaskaskia, Illinois Territory, U.S.
- Died: March 23, 1877 (aged 64); Mountain Meadows, Utah Territory, U.S.
- Cause of death: Execution by firing squad
- Resting place: Panguitch City Cemetery; 37°48′57.96″N 112°24′56.88″W
- Spouse(s): Agatha Ann Woolsey; Nancy Bean; Louisa Free; Sarah Caroline Williams; Rachel Andora Woolsey; Polly Ann Workman; Martha Elizabeth Berry; Delethia Morris; Nancy Ann Vance; Emoline Vaughn Woolsey; Nancy Gibbons; Mary Vance Young; Lavina Young; Mary Leah Groves; Mary Ann Williams; Emma Louise Batchelor; Terressa Morse; Ann Gordge
- Children: 56

John Doyle Lee (September 6, 1812 – March 23, 1877) was an American pioneer, and prominent early member of the Latter Day Saint Movement in Utah. Lee was later excommunicated from the Church and convicted of mass murder for his complicity in the 1857 Mountain Meadows Massacre. He was sentenced to death and, in 1877, was executed by firing squad at the site of the massacre.

== Early Mormon leader ==
Lee was born on September 6, 1812, in Kaskaskia, Illinois Territory, and joined the Church of Jesus Christ of Latter Day Saints in 1838. He was a friend of Joseph Smith, founder of the church, and was the adopted son of Brigham Young under the early Latter Day Saint law of adoption doctrine. In 1839, Lee served as a missionary with his boyhood friend, Levi Stewart. Together they preached in Illinois, Ohio, Kentucky, and Tennessee. During this period Lee converted and baptized "Wild Bill" Hickman. Lee practiced plural marriage and had 19 wives (at least eleven of whom eventually left him) along with 56 children.

Lee was a member of the Danites, a fraternal vigilante organization. The Danites were first organized in Caldwell County, Missouri, during the Mormon War. Lee was also an official scribe for the Council of Fifty, a group of men who provided guidance in practical matters to the church, specifically concerning the move westward out of the established areas United States in the east to the Rocky Mountains. After Smith's death, Lee went with Brigham Young and other Latter Day Saints to what is now Utah, and worked towards establishing several new communities there. Some of those communities included Lee's Ferry and Lonely Dell Ranch, located near Page, Arizona. A successful and resourceful farmer and rancher, in 1856, Lee became a United States Indian Agent in the Iron County, Utah, area, where he was assigned to help Native Americans establish farms. In 1858, Lee served a term as a member of the Utah Territorial Legislature, and following church orders in 1872, Lee moved from Iron County and established a heavily used ferry crossing on the Colorado River, where the site is still called Lee's Ferry. The nearby ranch was named the Lonely Dell Ranch and is now listed on the National Register of Historic Places, together with the ferry site.

== Mountain Meadows massacre ==
=== Massacre ===
In September 1857, the Baker–Fancher party, an emigrant group from Arkansas, camped at Mountain Meadows, a staging area in southern Utah used to prepare for the long crossing of the Mojave Desert by groups travelling westward to California. They were attacked by a combined group of Native Americans and Mormon militia men dressed as Native Americans. There were multiple motives for the conflict, including a general atmosphere of rising tensions between the US Federal government and Mormon settlers (see Utah War of 1857–1858) and a rumor that the Baker–Fancher party included those who had murdered Mormons at the 1838 event known as Haun's Mill massacre.

On the third day of the siege, Lee (not dressed as a Native American) approached the Baker–Fancher encirclement under cover of a white flag and convinced the emigrants to surrender their weapons and property to the Mormons in return for safe conduct to nearby Cedar City. The emigrants accepted the offer. They were escorted some distance from the camp and then attacked. Approximately 120 members of the Baker–Fancher were murdered. About 17 small children under the age of six were spared. William Ashworth notes in his autobiography that after the massacre, the "leaders among the white men had bound themselves under the most binding oaths to never reveal their part in it." Lee told Brigham Young that the Indians had been solely responsible, that "no white men were mixed up in it."

Lee later maintained that he had acted under orders from his militia leaders, under protest, and remained active in Mormonism and local government for several years afterwards. Lee was excommunicated in 1870 under mounting federal attention to the massacre.

=== Arrest and execution ===
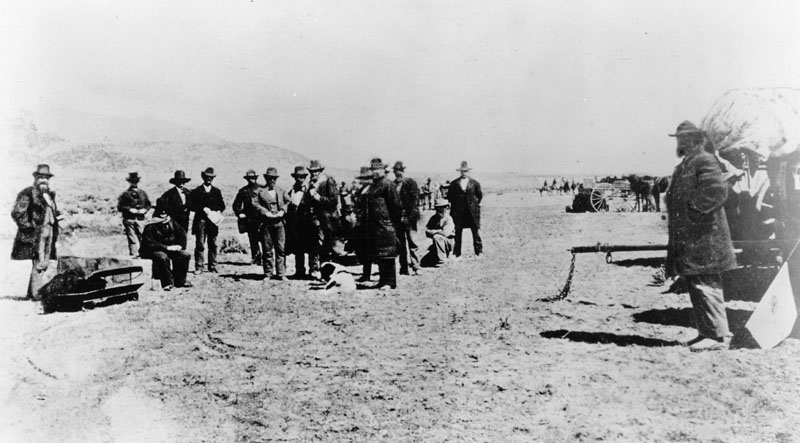
Photograph of Lee (seated on his coffin) just prior to his execution.

In 1874, Lee was arrested and tried for leading the massacre. The first trial ended inconclusively with a hung jury, seemingly because of the prosecution's attempt to portray Brigham Young as the true mastermind of the massacre. A second trial in 1876, in which the prosecution placed the blame squarely on Lee's shoulders, ended with his conviction and he was sentenced to death. Lee never denied his own complicity, but claimed he had not personally killed anyone. He said he had been a vocally reluctant participant and later a scapegoat meant to draw attention away from other Mormon leaders who were also involved. Lee further maintained that Brigham Young had no knowledge of the event until after it happened. However, in the Life and Confessions of John D. Lee he (or an editor) wrote, "I have always believed, since that day, that General George A. Smith was then visiting southern Utah to prepare the people for the work of exterminating Captain Fancher's train of emigrants, and I now believe that he was sent for that purpose by the direct command of Brigham Young."

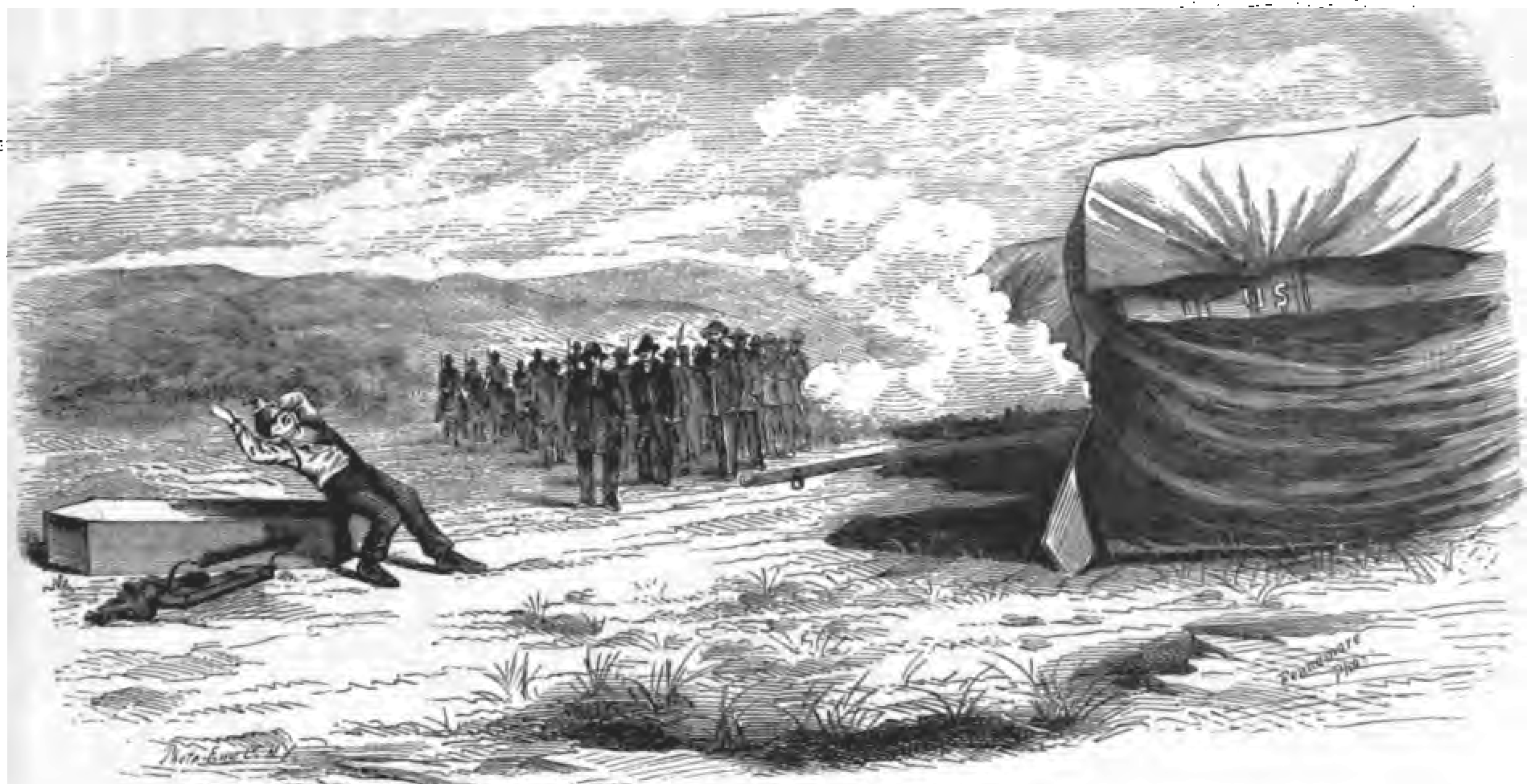
Drawing of Lee's execution.

On March 23, 1877, Lee was executed by firing squad at Mountain Meadows on the site of the 1857 massacre. His last words included a reference to Young: "I do not believe everything that is now being taught and practiced by Brigham Young. I do not care who hears it. It is my last word... I have been sacrificed in a cowardly, dastardly manner." On April 20, 1961, the LDS Church posthumously reinstated Lee's membership in the church.

== Descendants ==
Lee had 19 wives and 56 children, and his descendants are now numerous. Former solicitor general Rex E. Lee is a direct descendant of John Lee, as are his sons Senator Mike Lee of Utah and Utah Supreme Court justice Thomas R. Lee. Another descendant, Gordon H. Smith, was a U.S. senator from Oregon. U.S. representatives Mo Udall (D–AZ) and Stewart Udall (D–AZ) and their respective sons, senators Mark Udall (D–CO) and Tom Udall (D–NM) are also descendants. Stewart Udall served as United States Secretary of the Interior under presidents John F. Kennedy and Lyndon B. Johnson. See also the Lee–Hamblin family for a list of more of his noteworthy descendants.

== Film portrayals ==
John Lee was portrayed by Jon Gries in the film September Dawn (2007).

== See also ==
- Capital punishment in Utah
- List of people executed in Utah
