= U.S. Route 89A =

Highway in Arizona and Utah

U.S. Route 89A
- US 89A highlighted in red

Route information
- Auxiliary route of US 89
- Maintained by ADOT and UDOT
- Length: 91.74 mi (147.64 km)
- Existed: 1960–present
- Tourist routes: Fredonia–Vermillion Cliffs Scenic Road

Major junctions
- South end: US 89 in Bitter Springs, AZ
- SR 67 in Jacob Lake, AZ; SR 389 in Fredonia, AZ
- North end: US 89 in Kanab, UT

Location
- Country: United States
- Counties: AZ: Coconino; UT: Kane

Highway system
- United States Numbered Highway System; List; Special; Divided
- Utah State Highway System; Interstate; US; State; Minor; Scenic
- Arizona State Highway System; Interstate; US; State; Scenic Proposed; Former
← SR-89	UT	→ SR-90
← SR 89	AZ	→ SR 89A

U.S. Route 89A is a 91.74-mile (147.64 km) north–south auxiliary U.S. highway (though its actual direction of travel is more east–west) in southwestern Kane County, Utah and northeastern Coconino County, Arizona in the southwestern United States. The highway is an old routing of U.S. Route 89 from Bitter Springs, Arizona to Kanab, Utah. The state of Arizona has designated this highway the Fredonia-Vermilion Cliffs Scenic Road. The highway is used to access the North Rim of Grand Canyon National Park and is known for the Navajo Bridge. Until 2008, the Utah portion was signed State Route 11. The route provides the only direct road connection between the Arizona Strip and the rest of Arizona.

== Route description ==
The highway's southern terminus is at U.S. Route 89 south of Page, Arizona. Its northern terminus is in Kanab, Utah, also at US 89. US 89A runs near or through Lee's Ferry, the Navajo Bridge, Vermilion Cliffs, the Kaibab Plateau, and Fredonia, Arizona. The eastern portion of the highway runs through part of the Navajo Nation. From Jacob Lake, Arizona State Route 67 (AZ 67) branches off south, leading to the North Rim of Grand Canyon National Park. US 89A then continues north to the neighboring cities of Fredonia, Arizona and Kanab, Utah. The Utah portion of US 89A is defined by Utah Code Annotated §72-4-114.

== History ==
This was part of mainline US 89 until the construction of Glen Canyon Dam. In 1960, US 89 was moved to a new, more northerly route and the old route became US 89A.

The Utah segment of US 89A was first commissioned as part of Utah State Route 11. This highway ran from Nephi to the Arizona state line near Kanab. This route is still drivable as the modern US 89A, US 89, and Utah SR-132. With the establishment of the United States highway system in 1926, most of SR-11 was used for the routing of US 89 through southern Utah; the internal designation used by state agencies remained SR-11. In 1969, as part of a series of changes to state routes, the portion north of Sevier Junction (I-70 and US 89 near Joseph) was transferred to other routes, removing the only part of State Route 11 that was signed with the state designation. It is also during this time that a new alignment for US 89 was constructed to serve the Glen Canyon Dam, with SR-11 being now signed as US 89A south of Kanab and US 89 to the north. As part of the 1977 Utah state route renumbering to conform signage and legislative definitions, SR-11 was truncated to what is now signed US 89A. The route was signed SR-11, with "TO US 89A" at the northern terminus in Kanab and a "TO US 89" at the Arizona state line. In 2008, however, SR-11 was deleted after a bill in the Utah legislature was passed to restore U.S. Route 89A in Utah.

From 1941 to 1992, there was a discontinuous southern portion US 89A running from Flagstaff to Prescott, Arizona, now designated Arizona State Route 89A.

== Junction list ==
State	County	Location	mi	km	Destinations	Notes
Arizona	Coconino	Bitter Springs	0.000	0.000	US 89 – Page, Flagstaff	Southern terminus; milepost 524
Arizona	Coconino	Jacob Lake	55.23	88.88	SR 67 south – North Rim, Grand Canyon National Park	Milepost 579
Arizona	Coconino	Fredonia	85.07	136.91	SR 389 west to I-15 – Colorado City, Hurricane	Milepost 609
			88.88 0.000	143.04 0.000	Arizona–Utah state line	
Utah	Kane	Kanab	2.945	4.740	US 89 – Panguitch, Big Water, Salt Lake City, Page (Arizona)	Northern terminus; highway continues as US-89 north (100 E north)
1.000 mi = 1.609 km; 1.000 km = 0.621 mi

== Gallery ==
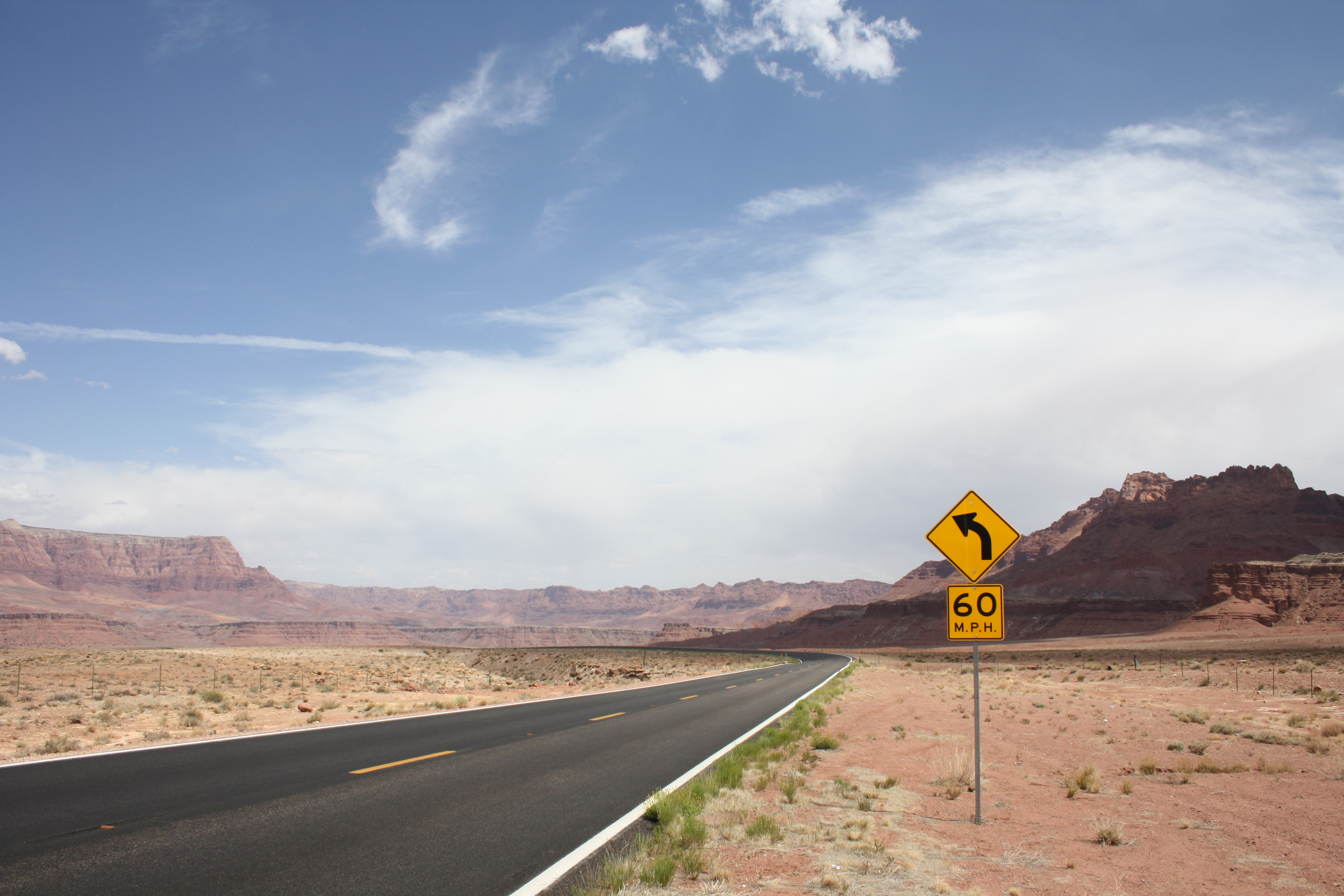
US 89A southeast of the Navajo Bridge, June 2009

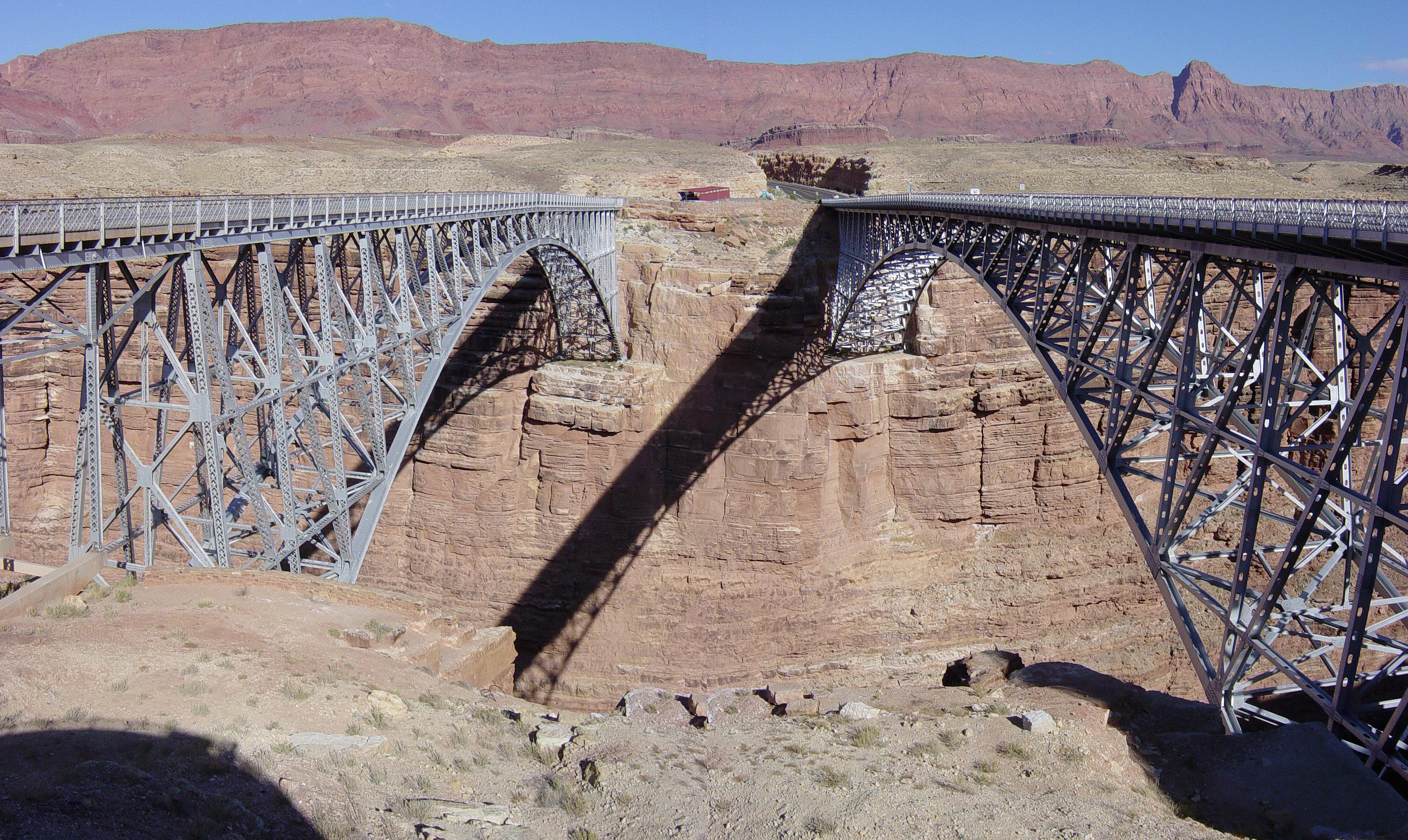
The Navajo Bridges over Marble Canyon along US 89A, June 2009.

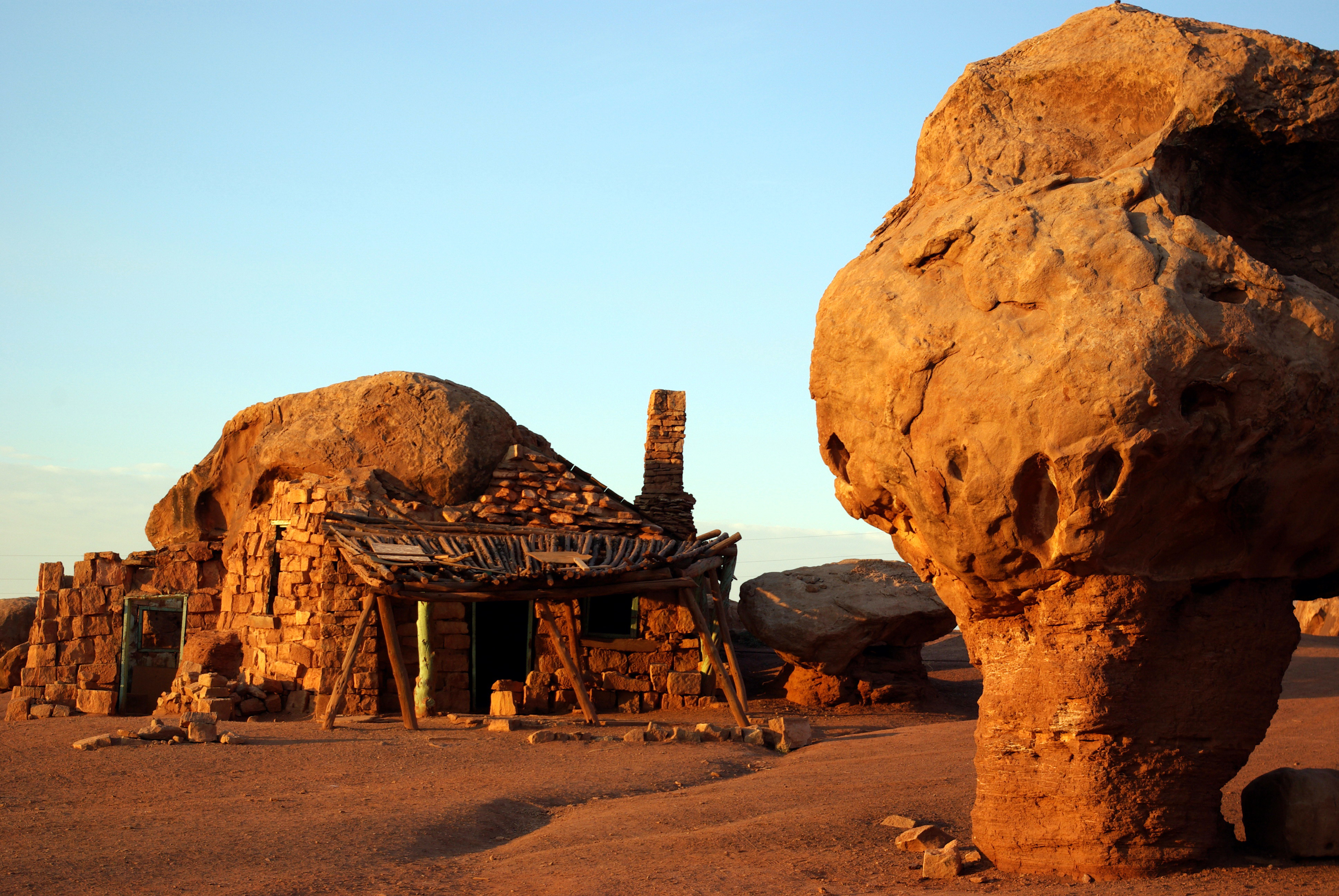
Stone House at the Vermilion Cliffs, near Cliff Dwellers Lodge, Arizona.

== See also ==
- List of U.S. Highways in Arizona
- List of U.S. Highways in Utah
- U.S. Route 89
- Arizona State Route 89A
- List of highways numbered 89
