= Bitter Springs, Arizona =

Census-designated place in Coconino County, Arizona

Bitter Springs, Arizona Díchʼíító (Navajo)
- Census-designated place
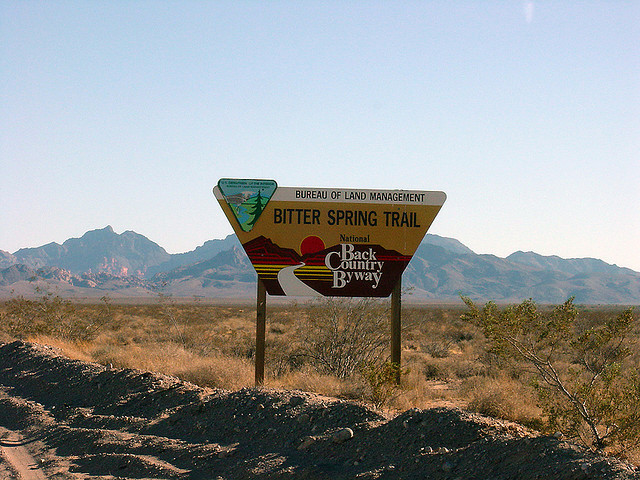
- The Bitterspring trail, located off a Bureau of Land Management Back Country Byway in Coconino County

- Location in Coconino County and the state of Arizona

- Location in the United States
- Coordinates: 36°36′42″N 111°38′48″W
- Country: United States
- State: Arizona
- County: Coconino

Area
  - Total: 8.02 sq mi (20.77 km^{2})
  - Land: 8.02 sq mi (20.77 km^{2})
  - Water: 0 sq mi (0.00 km^{2})
- Elevation: 5,604 ft (1,708 m)

Population (2020)
  - Total: 355
  - Density: 44.3/sq mi (17.09/km^{2})
- Time zone: UTC-7 (MST)
  - Summer (DST): UTC-6 (MDT)
- FIPS code: 04-06470
- GNIS feature ID: 2407852

Bitter Springs (Navajo: Díchʼíító) is a native village and census-designated place (CDP) on the Navajo Nation in Coconino County, Arizona, United States. As of the 2020 census, the CDP population was 364.

== Geography ==
According to the United States Census Bureau, the CDP has a total area of 8.0 square miles (20.8 km^{2}), all land.

Bitter Springs is the terminus of U.S. Route 89A, a spur route cut off by the construction of the Glen Canyon Dam.

== Demographics ==
Languages (2000)	Percent
Spoke Navajo at home	73%
Spoke English at home	27%

Historical population
Census	Pop.	Note	%±
2000	547		—
2010	452		−17.4%
2020	355		−21.5%
U.S. Decennial Census

Bitter Springs first appeared on the 2000 U.S. Census as a census-designated place (CDP).

As of the census of 2000, there were 547 people, 104 households, and 97 families residing in the CDP. The population density was 66.1 inhabitants per square mile (25.5/km^{2}). There were 127 housing units at an average density of 15.3 per square mile (5.9/km^{2}). The racial makeup of the CDP was 99% Native American and 1% White, with <1% of the population made up of Hispanic or Latino of any race.

There were 104 households, out of which 73% had children under the age of 18 living with them, 58% were married couples living together, 26% had a female householder with no husband present, and 5.8% were non-families. 4.8% of all households were made up of individuals, and 2% had someone living alone who was 65 years of age or older. The average household size was 5.3 and the average family size was 5.3.

In the CDP, the age distribution of the population shows 48% under the age of 18, 14% from 18 to 24, 25% from 25 to 44, 11% from 45 to 64, and 2% who were 65 years of age or older. The median age was 19 years. For every 100 females, there were 98.9 males. For every 100 females age 18 and over, there were 80.3 males.

The median income for a household in the CDP was $24,886, and the median income for a family was $30,217. Males had a median income of $11,477 versus $14,038 for females. The per capita income for the CDP was $7,985. About 25% of families and 30% of the population were below the poverty line, including 25% of those under age 18 and none of those age 65 or over.

== Education ==
Bitter Springs is served by the Page Unified School District. The schools serving Bitter Springs are in Page, Arizona.

== See also ==
- List of census-designated places in Arizona
