= Charles H. Spencer hulk =

Coordinates: 36°51.945′N 111°34.825′W

- U.S. National Register of Historic Places
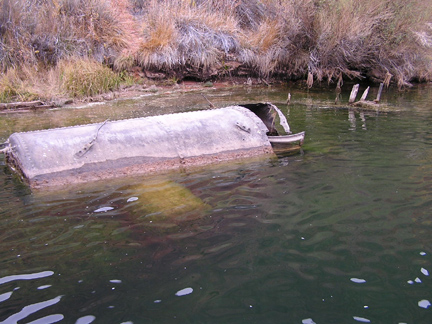

- Location within Arizona Location within the United States
- Nearest city: Lee's Ferry, Arizona
- Built: 1911
- NRHP reference No.: 89001593
- Added to NRHP: October 15, 1989

The Charles H. Spencer was a stern-wheel steamboat that was briefly used on the Colorado River to transport coal for gold refining operations at Lee's Ferry, Arizona.

Charles Harvey Spencer (1872-1968) was a prospector who arrived at Lee's Ferry in 1910 in search of gold hidden in shale of the Chinle Formation. The American Placer Corporation, processed the shale by creating a mud and then removing the gold deposits by mercury amalgamation, which required a steady source of power. Finding a coal seam up river, Spencer commissioned a San Francisco company, Robertson–Schultz Co., to build the stern-wheel paddle steamer, Charles H. Spencer, for the American Placer Corporation. James Robertson and Herman Rosenfelt built the ship. It was 92.5 feet long, 25 feet abeam and had a draft of 18 to 20 inches. A 110 horse-power marine boiler powered a 12-foot stern paddle. The various parts were manufactured in San Francisco, shipped by rail to Marysvale, Utah, and conveyed by ox-cart to the mouth of Warm Creek, where the boat was assembled. The boat averaged 5–6 tons of coal on each trip. But by the end of the summer the operation was curtailed. The boat was docked and then abandoned in 1914. During a flood in 1921, the boat sank in shallow water. Later the superstructure was stripped of its lumber. Its boiler remains in the river marking the site of its sinking and a historical marker is located above it on the bank, about 1/4 mile east of the end of Lees ferry road.
