= The Gap, Arizona =

Unincorporated community in Arizona, United States

- Unincorporated community
- Location within the state of Arizona Location within the United States
- Coordinates: 36.303881°N 111.460574°W
- Country: United States
- State: Arizona
- County: Coconino
- Time zone: UTC-7 (Mountain (MST))
  - Summer (DST): UTC-7 (MST)

The Gap is an unincorporated community on the Navajo Nation in Coconino County, Arizona, United States.

== Description ==
The very small community is located along U.S. Route 89 (US 89) at its junction with the south end of Navajo Route 20 (N20), formerly U.S. Route 89T, at mile marker 489. Just east of the community is its namesake, The Gap, a gap in the Echo Cliffs.

While the community includes not much more than a trading post, a gas station, a school, and a tribal administrative building, in an addition to few homes, it is important as the only place were services are offered along the 80-mile (130 km) stretch of US 89 between Cameron and Page. However, it became more significant in February 2013 when a geological event caused a 150-foot (46 m) stretch of US 89 to buckle. The site of the road damage was about 3 miles (4.8 km) north of Bitter Springs (and the US 89A junction with US 89) and about 25 miles (40 km) south of Page. The loss of this stretch of road forced detours for traffic entering the Page area from the south. Motorists were rerouted on a 115-mile (185 km) detour via U.S. Route 160 and State Route 98 or a 90-mile (140 km) detour on N20, which had a 28-mile (45 km) unpaved stretch. Since the southern end of N20 is within the community, once N20 was paved several months later and also designated as U.S. Route 89T (US 89T), for the next two years most traffic along US 89 north of The Gap was diverted to US 89T. After the road repairs were completed in March 2015, the US 89T designation was retired.
