= List of bridges documented by the Historic American Engineering Record in Arizona =

This is a list of bridges documented by the Historic American Engineering Record in the US state of Arizona.

== Bridges ==
| Survey No. | Name (as assigned by HAER) | Status | Type | Built | Documented | Carries | Crosses | Location | County | Coordinates |
|---|---|---|---|---|---|---|---|---|---|---|
| AZ-1 | Kaibab Trail Suspension Bridge | Extant | Suspension | 1928 | 1975 | South Kaibab Trail | Colorado River | Grand Canyon Village | Coconino | 36°06′03″N 112°05′21″W |
| AZ-9 | Holbrook Bridge | Demolished | Warren truss | 1928 | 1986 | SR 77 | Little Colorado River | Holbrook | Navajo | 34°53′52″N 110°09′45″W |
| AZ-10 | Verde River Sheep Bridge | Replaced | Suspension | 1944 | 1987 | Tonto National Forest trail | Verde River | Cave Creek | Maricopa | 34°04′39″N 111°42′26″W |
| AZ-13 | Rio Puerco Bridge | Replaced | Steel built-up girder | 1932 | 1988 | Petrified Forest National Park Mainline Road | Rio Pruerco | Holbrook | Navajo | 34°58′41″N 109°47′40″W |
| AZ-18 | Arizona Eastern Railroad Bridge | Extant | Pratt truss | 1915 | 1989 | Southern Pacific Railroad | Salt River | Tempe | Maricopa | 33°25′59″N 111°56′38″W |
| AZ-26 | Cedar Canyon Bridge | Extant | Steel arch | 1937 | 1990 | US 60 | Cedar Canyon | Show Low | Navajo | 34°03′32″N 110°12′36″W |
| AZ-27 | Corduroy Creek Bridge | Extant | Steel arch | 1937 | 1990 | US 60 | Corduroy Creek | Show Low | Navajo | 34°06′25″N 110°09′13″W |
| AZ-28 | Navajo Bridge | Bypassed | Steel hinged arch | 1929 | 1990 | US 89A | Colorado River | Page | Coconino | 36°49′04″N 111°37′54″W |
| AZ-29 | Ash Avenue Bridge | Demolished | Reinforced concrete open-spandrel arch | 1913 | 1990 | Ash Avenue | Salt River | Tempe | Maricopa | 33°25′52″N 111°56′33″W |
| AZ-34 | Cameron Suspension Bridge | Bypassed | Suspension | 1911 | 1993 | US 89A | Little Colorado River | Cameron | Coconino | 35°52′38″N 111°24′43″W |
| AZ-36 | Hassayampa Bridge | Bypassed | Reinforced concrete girder | 1929 | 1993 | Historic US 80 | Hassayampa River | Arlington | Maricopa | 33°11′10″N 112°42′15″W |
| AZ-46 | Dead Indian Canyon Bridge | Bypassed | Warren truss | 1934 | 1994 | SR 64 (Cameron Approach Road) (former) | Dead Indian Canyon | Grand Canyon Village | Coconino | 35°55′58″N 111°38′29″W |
| AZ-48 | Whispering Pines Bridge | Replaced | Pratt truss | 1913 | 1995 | Forest Service Control Road | East Verde River | Payson | Gila | 34°22′42″N 111°17′03″W |
| AZ-50-D | San Carlos Irrigation Project, Sacaton Dam and Bridge | Extant | Reinforced concrete girder | 1926 | 1995 | Olberg Road | Gila River | Coolidge | Pinal | 33°05′19″N 111°41′11″W |
| AZ-57 | London Bridge | Extant | Stone arch | 1971 | 1998 | McCulloch Boulevard North | Bridgewater Channel Canal | Lake Havasu City | Mohave | 34°28′18″N 114°20′50″W |
| AZ-58 | Petrified Forest National Park Roads and Bridges | | | | 2001 | Petrified Forest National Park roads | | Holbrook | Navajo | |
| AZ-59 | Jim Camp Wash Bridge | Replaced | Reinforced concrete cast-in-place slab | 1934 | 2001 | Petrified Forest National Park road | Jim Camp Wash | Holbrook | Navajo | 34°48′53″N 109°51′46″W |
| AZ-63 | Yuma Crossing | Extant | Pennsylvania truss | 1877 | 1983 | Historic US 80 and Southern Pacific Railroad | Colorado River | Yuma | Yuma | 32°43′43″N 114°36′56″W |
| AZ-65-O | Childs-Irving Hydroelectric Project, Childs System, Flume Bridge No. 2 | Demolished | Warren truss | 1908 | 2004 | Childs-Irving Hydroelectric Facilities flume | Boulder Canyon Wash | Camp Verde | Yavapai | 34°23′26″N 111°38′56″W |
| AZ-65-P | Childs-Irving Hydroelectric Project, Childs System, Flume Bridge No. 3 | Demolished | Warren truss | 1908 | 2004 | Childs-Irving Hydroelectric Facilities flume | Sally May Wash | Camp Verde | Yavapai | 34°23′11″N 111°39′21″W |
| AZ-65-Q | Childs-Irving Hydroelectric Project, Childs System, Flume Bridge No. 4 | Demolished | Trestle | 1908 | 2004 | Childs-Irving Hydroelectric Facilities flume | Unnamed wash | Camp Verde | Yavapai | 34°23′06″N 111°39′31″W |
| AZ-65-S | Childs-Irving Hydroelectric Project, Childs System, Steel Flume on Trestles | Demolished | Trestle | 1908 | 2004 | Childs-Irving Hydroelectric Facilities flume | Unnamed wash | Camp Verde | Yavapai | 34°23′04″N 111°39′48″W |
| AZ-65-U | Childs-Irving Hydroelectric Project, Childs System, Flume Bridge No. 5 | Demolished | Trestle | 1908 | 2004 | Childs-Irving Hydroelectric Facilities flume | Unnamed wash | Camp Verde | Yavapai | 34°22′45″N 111°39′49″W |
| AZ-69 | Gillespie Dam Bridge | Extant | Parker truss | 1927 | 2006 | Historic US 80 | Gila River | Arlington | Maricopa | 33°13′38″N 112°46′10″W |
| AZ-96 | Hell Canyon Bridge | Replaced | Pratt truss | 1954 | 2014 | SR 89 | Hell Canyon | Drake | Yavapai | 34°59′34″N 112°23′30″W |
