= Cedar Canyon =

Cedar Canyon may refer to:

- Cedar Canyon, Mid Hills, California, a canyon in San Bernardino County, California
- Cedar Canyon, San Ysidro Mountains, a canyon in the San Ysidro Mountains, San Diego County, California
- Cedar Canyon, South Dakota, an unincorporated community
- Cedar Canyon Bridge, a bridge in Arizona
