= List of U.S. Highways in Arizona =

United States Numbered Highways of the Arizona State Highway System
- Example signage from Arizona's U.S. Highways
- U.S. Highways highlighted in red Special routes highlighted in blue

System information
- Maintained by ADOT and local jurisdictions
- Length: 2,060.22 mi (3,315.60 km) Includes overlaps with Interstates and State Routes
- Formed: November 11, 1926 (by AASHO); September 9, 1927 (by Arizona)

Highway names
- Interstates: Interstate X (I-X)
- US Highways: U.S. Route X (US X)
- State: State Route X (SR X)

System links
- Arizona State Highway System; Interstate; US; State; Scenic Proposed; Former

The U.S Highways in Arizona are the segments of the United States Numbered Highways that run within the U.S. state of Arizona.

== History ==
The United States Numbered Highway System (U.S. Highway System) was originally approved by the United States Department of Agriculture Joint Board on Interstate Highways on November 11, 1926, and was to be overseen and maintained by the American Association of State Highway Officials (AASHO). The Arizona State Highway Department (ASHD) formally recognized the U.S. Highways on September 9, 1927, during the establishment of the Arizona State Highway System. When the U.S. Highways within Arizona were first being planned, the proposed routes consisted of U.S. Route 60 (US 60) from Topock to Lupton, US 70 from Holbrook to New Mexico, US 80 from Yuma to New Mexico, US 89 from Flagstaff to Utah, US 91 from Nevada to Utah through the Arizona Strip, US 180 from Florence Junction to New Mexico, US 280 from Ash Fork to Phoenix and US 380 from Tucson to Nogales. When the system was commissioned however, noticeable changes had been made. US 60 had been renumbered to US 66 and US 280 and US 380 became a southern extension of US 89. This also meant US 89 shared a long concurrency with US 80 between Phoenix and Tucson, as well as a wrong-way concurrency with US 66 between Flagstaff and Ash Fork.

In 1931, US 70 became the first U.S. Highway to be decommissioned in Arizona. It was replaced by US 60 between Springerville and New Mexico, and by a newly commissioned highway designated US 260 between Holbrook and Springerville. US 60 had also been established over other existing state highways from Ehrenberg to Springerville, creating a concurrency with US 80 and US 89 between Phoenix and Florence Junction. US 70 was given a new routing between Clovis and El Paso, Texas via Alamogordo, New Mexico. US 180 was re-designated as part of a new extension of US 70 through Arizona in 1935. US 70 also ran entirely concurrent with US 60 from Ehrenberg to Globe.

1935 was also the year US 466 and US 93 were extended southeast from Nevada to Kingman, by way of the recently completed Boulder Dam (now Hoover Dam). Both US 93 and US 466 were entirely concurrent with each other in Arizona. By 1939, US 666 had been extended south into Arizona, at a terminus with US 80 in Douglas. US 666 was concurrent with US 66 between Lupton and Sanders, US 260 from St. Johns to Alpine and US 70 between San Jose and Safford. By this time, US 260 had also been extended southeast to New Mexico. In 1941, an alternate route of US 89 known as US 89A had been established over former State Route 79 (SR 79) between Prescott and Flagstaff, via Jerome and Sedona.

Following the end of the Second World War, traffic had greatly increased on the U.S. Highway System throughout the country, resulting in an increase of traffic accidents and rough road conditions. These factors would contribute to the Federal Aid Highway Act of 1956, which established the Interstate and Defense Highway System (which are often referred to as "Interstates" for short) was established. This new network of nationwide freeways was slated to replace the heaviest traveled U.S. Highways and state highways in the country. Five Interstates were planned in Arizona to supplant or bypass existing U.S. Highways. US 60 between Ehrenberg and Phoenix was to be replaced by the western section of the newly planned Interstate 10 (I-10), I-8 and the eastern section of I-10 were to bypass or replace the entirety of US 80, I-40 was to replace the entirety of US 66, I-17 and I-19 were to replace parts of US 89 and I-15 was to replace all of US 91. Construction of the Interstate Highway system was well underway by 1957.

Despite the introduction of the Interstates, attention was still paid to designating new U.S. Highways or altering the routes of existing examples. In 1959, US 89 between Utah and Bitter Springs was moved onto a new route through Page over the Glen Canyon Dam. The older route between Utah and Bitter Springs became a northern extension of US 89A. In 1960, the southern section of SR 95 between Quartzsite and San Luis was re-designated as an extension of US 95. The remainder of US 95 in Arizona was concurrent with US 60 (future I-10) between Ehrenberg and Quartzsite. In 1961, US 260 had been decommissioned and made into a western extension of US 180. US 180 was also extended over US 66 from Holbrook to Flagstaff and replaced SR 164 between Flagstaff and Valle. In 1965, sections of SR 64 and SR 364 between US 89 and Four Corners were designated as part of the new US 164. US 164 was also concurrent with US 89 between former SR 64 and US 66 in Flagstaff. US 93 was also extended southeast from US 66 in Kingman to a junction with US 89 near Wickenburg, replacing part of SR 93. In 1969, US 70 was truncated to Globe, no longer running concurrently with US 60 to California.

The year 1970 brought substantial changes to highways within the Four Corners region. The short existence of US 164 lasted only six years, when it was replaced by a re-routing of US 160. However, the concurrency between US 89 and US 164 was removed and not made part of US 160. US 163 was also established in the Navajo Nation, starting at US 160 near Kayenta and going through Monument Valley into Utah. Before US 163 was established, the route was designated as SR 464 In 1974, US 91 was entirely decommissioned south of Brigham City, Utah. I-15 had completely taken its place. In 1977, US 80 was truncated from Yuma to Benson. Most of the route was replaced by I-8 and I-10. However, the section between Gila Bend and Buckeye replaced by a northern extension of SR 85. In 1979, the American Association of State Highway and Transportation Officials (AASHTO) approved a request from California and Arizona to truncate US 66 from the California state line, east to I-40 and US 666 in Sanders. However, Arizona continued to designate and sign US 66 between Sanders and I-40/US 93 in Kingman.

The 1980s and early 1990s would see the last large scale changes to U.S. Highways in Arizona. In 1981, SR 63 was decommissioned after it and BIA Route 12 became a southern extension of US 191 across the Utah state line into Arizona near Mexican Water, ending at US 66/I-40 in Chambers. In 1982, US 60 was truncated between the Colorado River in California to I-10 in Brenda. I-10 entirely replaced US 60 from Brenda west into California. Arizona unsigned and decommissioned all of US 66 internally in 1984, following the completion of I-40. The remaining sections became business loops of I-40 or SR 66. AASHTO recognized and approved the elimination of US 66 in 1985, with the entire route also being removed nationwide. In 1988, US 64 was extended from New Mexico into Arizona over SR 504 to US 160 in Teec Nos Pos. Coincidentally, the small section of US 64 in Arizona was once designated as a section of SR 64.

US 80 was eliminated from Arizona in 1989, after both Arizona and New Mexico had requested AASHTO to remove the designation from both states. What remained of Arizona's section was redesignated as SR 80. In 1992, when US 89 was truncated from Nogales to Flagstaff, and when US 666 was decommissioned, becoming an extension of US 191. The elimination of US 89 south of Flagstaff also allowed US 93 to be extended south to a new terminus with US 60 in Wickenburg. The remaining sections of US 89, not concurrent with US 60, I-19 or I-40 became part of SR 77, SR 79 and SR 89. The truncation of US 89 was followed by the truncation of US 89A from Prescott to US 89 south of Page. Between Prescott and Flagstaff, former US 89A became SR 89A.

== List ==
Historical U.S. Highway Markers Used in Arizona

1926–1956

1956–1960 (Northbound)

1956–1960 (Eastbound)

1956–1960 (Southbound)

1956–1960 (Westbound)

1960–1963 (Northbound)

1960–1963 (Eastbound)

1960–1963 (Southbound)

1960–1963 (Westbound)

1963–1991

1991–Present

Number	Length (mi)	Length (km)	Southern or western terminus	Northern or eastern terminus	Formed	Removed	Notes
US 60	369.31	594.35	I-10 at Brenda	US 60 at New Mexico state line	1932	current	Formerly ran–California state line near Ehrenberg.
US 64	4.14	6.66	US 160	US 64 at New Mexico state line	1989	current	Shortest U.S. Route in Arizona
US 66	332	534	US 66 at Topock	US 66 near Lupton	1926	1985	Replaced by I-40 and SR 66; designated as a Historic Route and National Scenic Byway state-wide.
US 70	107.5	173.0	US 70 at New Mexico state line	US 66 at Holbrook	1926	1932	Replaced by US 60 and US 260
US 70	122.08	196.47	US 60 in Globe	US 70 at New Mexico state line	1935	current	Ran concurrently with US 60–California border near Ehrenberg until 1969.
US 80	486	782	US 80 at Yuma	US 80 at New Mexico state line	1926	1989	Replaced by I-8 and I-10. Remaining route became SR 80. Designated as a Historic Route state-wide.
US 89	137.85	221.85	I-40 BL / US 180 at Flagstaff	US-89 at Utah state line	1926	current	Historically ended in Nogales
US 89A	86.90	139.85	US 89	US-89A at Utah state line	1960	current	Old routing of US 89
US 89A	88	142	US 89 at Prescott	US 89/I-40 BL at Flagstaff	1941	1993	Became SR 89A. Designated a Historic Route from Jerome to Cottonwood.
US 91	15	24	US-91 at Utah state line	US 91 at Nevada state line	1926	1974	Replaced by I-15 and Mohave County Route 91.
US 93	199.38	320.87	US 60 at Wickenburg	I-11/US 93 at Nevada state line	1935	current	
US 95	123.36	198.53	Fed. 2 at the Mexican Border at San Luis, AZ	I-10 / US 95 at California state line	1960	current	Formerly SR 95
US 160	159.35	256.45	US 89	US 160 at New Mexico state line	1970	current	Formerly SR 64 and SR 164
US 163	23.21	37.35	US 160	US-163 at Utah state line	1970	current	
US 164	217.40	349.87	US 66 / US 180 / US 89 in Flagstaff	US 164 at New Mexico state line	1964	1970	Replaced by US 160
US 180	170.8	274.9	US 60 / US 80 / US 89 in Florence	US 180 near Franklin	1926	1935	Replaced completely by US 70 on June 17, 1935.
US 180	287.77	463.12	Grand Canyon National Park	US 180 at New Mexico state line	1961	current	ADOT signs west end at SR 64 in Valle
US 191	516.50	831.23	SR 80 at Douglas	US-191 at Utah state line	1982	current	Formerly SR 63 and US 666
US 260	283	455	Holbrook, AZ	Deming, NM	1931	1962	Now part of US 180
US 466	72.59	116.82	US 93 / US 466 at Nevada state line	US 66 at Kingman	1935	1971	Now US 93
US 666	373.37	600.88	I-40 / US 666 at New Mexico state line	SR 80 at Douglas	1938	1992	Now US 191
Former

== Special routes ==
Number	Length (mi)	Length (km)	Southern or western terminus	Northern or eastern terminus	Formed	Removed	Notes
US 80 Bus.	—	—	US 80 in Winterhaven, CA	US 80 in Yuma, AZ	c. 1957	c. 1976	Handed over to the city of Yuma.
US 80 Alt.	—	—	US 80 in Phoenix	US 80 in Phoenix	—	—	Handed over to the city of Phoenix. Exact dates of existence unknown.
US 80 Alt.	—	—	Washington Street in Phoenix	US 60/US 70/US 80/US 89 near Tempe	1930	1961	Handed over to the city of Phoenix. Was most likely never signed.
US 80 Truck	—	—	US 80 in Tombstone	US 80 in Tombstone	c. 1955	c. 1964	Replaced by US 80 (later SR 80).
US 89T	43.58	70.14	US 89 at The Gap	SR 98 in Page	2013	2015	Temporary route while US 89 was undergoing repairs. Replaced by Navajo Route 20.
US 93 Spur	0.29	0.47	I-40/US 93 in Kingman	Historic Route 66 in Kingman	2009	current	Signed as Historic US 66.
US 95 Truck	0.45	0.72	Fed. 2 at the Mexican Border in San Luis	US 95 in San Luis	1984	2015	Replaced by northbound US 95.
US 191 Bus.	1.15	1.85	Fed. 2 at the Mexican Border in Douglas	SR 80 in Douglas	1991	current	Former US 666 Bus.
US 666 Bus.	1.15	1.85	Fed. 2 at the Mexican Border in Douglas	SR 80 in Douglas	1962	1992	Replaced by US 191 Bus.
US 191T	14.22	22.88	US 191 in Clifton	US 666 north of the Morenci mine	1974	current	Former US 666T
US 666T	14.22	22.88	US 666 in Clifton	US 666 north of the Morenci mine	1974	1992	Replaced by US 191T
US 191Y	3.51	5.65	I-10 in Clifton	US 191 in Cochise County	1992	current	Former US 666Y
US 666Y	3.51	5.65	I-10 in Clifton	US 666 in Cochise County	1958	1992	Replaced by US 191Y
Former

== Historic routes ==
These are historic U.S. Highways recognized by the ADOT Parkways, Historic and Scenic Roads Program.

Number	Length (mi)	Length (km)	Southern or western terminus	Northern or eastern terminus	Formed	Removed	Notes
Historic US 66	204.14	328.53	I-40 in Topock	I-40 in Holbrook	1987	current	Sections of former US 66. Discontinuous sections connected by I-40.
Historic US 80	398.54	641.39	I-8 Business (Historic US 80) at the California state line in Yuma	NM 80 at the New Mexico state line	2018	current	Sections of former US 80. Discontinuous sections connected by I-8 and I-10.
Historic US 89A	9.99	16.08	SR 89A in Jerome	SR 89A and SR 260 in Cottonwood	1992	current	Sections of former US 89A.

== Proposed/Unconstructed ==
These are U.S. Highways which were planned to run through Arizona, but were never designated or constructed.

Number	Length (mi)	Length (km)	Southern or western terminus	Northern or eastern terminus	Formed	Removed	Notes
US 87	—	—	Proposed US 87 at New Mexico state line	Proposed US 87W/US 87E near Elfrida (First proposal); US 80 in Douglas (Second proposal)	—	—	Proposed twice in 1934 and 1943, but never commissioned
US 87E	—	—	Proposed US 87/US 87W near Elfrida	US 80 in Douglas	—	—	Proposed, but never commissioned
US 87W	—	—	Proposed US 87/US 87E near Elfrida	US 89 in Nogales	—	—	Proposed, but never commissioned
US 193	—	—	US 93 in Sacaton	US 93 in Picacho	—	—	Proposed, but never commissioned as a U.S. Highway.
US 789	—	—	Fed. 15 in Nogales	US 66/US 666/Proposed US 789 at New Mexico state line	—	—	Proposed, but never commissioned as a U.S. Highway. Designation only existed as SR 789.
Former
