= Gray Mountain, Arizona =

Unincorporated community in the state of Arizona, United States

- Unincorporated community
- Location within Arizona Location within the United States
- Coordinates: 35°44′45″N 111°28′25″W
- Country: United States
- State: Arizona
- County: Coconino
- Elevation: 5,029 ft (1,533 m)
- Time zone: UTC-7 (Mountain (MST))
- ZIP code: 86016
- Area code: 928
- GNIS feature ID: 5319

Gray Mountain is an unincorporated community in Coconino County, Arizona, United States. Gray Mountain is located on U.S. Route 89, 39 miles (63 km) north-northeast of Flagstaff, and 10 miles (16 km) south-southwest of Cameron.

The small community contained some motels, a trading post store, gas stations, and an Arizona Department of Transportation maintenance yard. The Gray Mountain Trading Post was first opened in 1935, and weathered a major fire in 1981. The Gray Mountain Motel burned down in 1989; Gray Mountain had no fire department, and the limited response from nearby fire departments raised concerns about rural firefighting in Arizona. Most of these facilities have since closed. The Whitling Brothers Motel which was abandoned in 2005 is now used by the Painted Desert Project, which decorates abandoned buildings in the area. A small gas station still operated at Gray Mountain as of 2018.

There have been proposals to place a wind farm on the Gray Mountain ridge laying immediately west of the community. The area is home to a large population of wild horses, though they have struggled due to drought conditions.

== Climate ==
According to the Köppen Climate Classification system, Gray Mountain has a semi-arid climate, abbreviated "BSk" on climate maps.

Gray Mountain was affected by an intense drought in 2018. Nearly 200 feral horses died while searching for water in a pond that had dried up; the horses became trapped in the remaining mud. Overpopulation played a role in the die-off; the Navajo Nation estimated that 50,000–70,000 horses live in the region.

The Gray Mountain area contains abandoned uranium mines which have contaminated some of the drinking water supply and caused deleterious health conditions among the local Navajo community. Little research has been conducted to determine the precise health effects of living near the uranium mines, and United States Federal Government initiatives to clean up uranium waste have been slow.
