= U.S. Route 89 in Arizona =

Section of U.S. Numbered Highway in Coconino County, Arizona, United States

U.S. Route 89
- US 89 highlighted in red; former US 89T in blue

Route information
- Maintained by ADOT
- Length: 136.49 mi (219.66 km)
- Existed: November 11, 1926–present
- History: Southern terminus was in Nogales until 1992
- NHS: Entire route

Major junctions
- South end: BL 40 / US 180 in Flagstaff
- SR 64 in Cameron; US 160 near Tuba City; US 89A near Bitter Springs; SR 98 in Page
- North end: US 89 northwest of Page

Location
- Country: United States
- State: Arizona
- Counties: Coconino

Highway system
- United States Numbered Highway System; List; Special; Divided; Arizona State Highway System; Interstate; US; State; Scenic Proposed; Former
← SR 88	→ SR 89

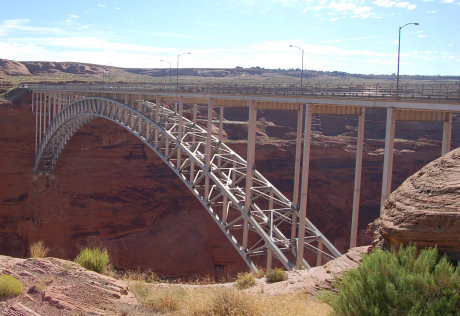
U.S. 89 crossing Glen Canyon

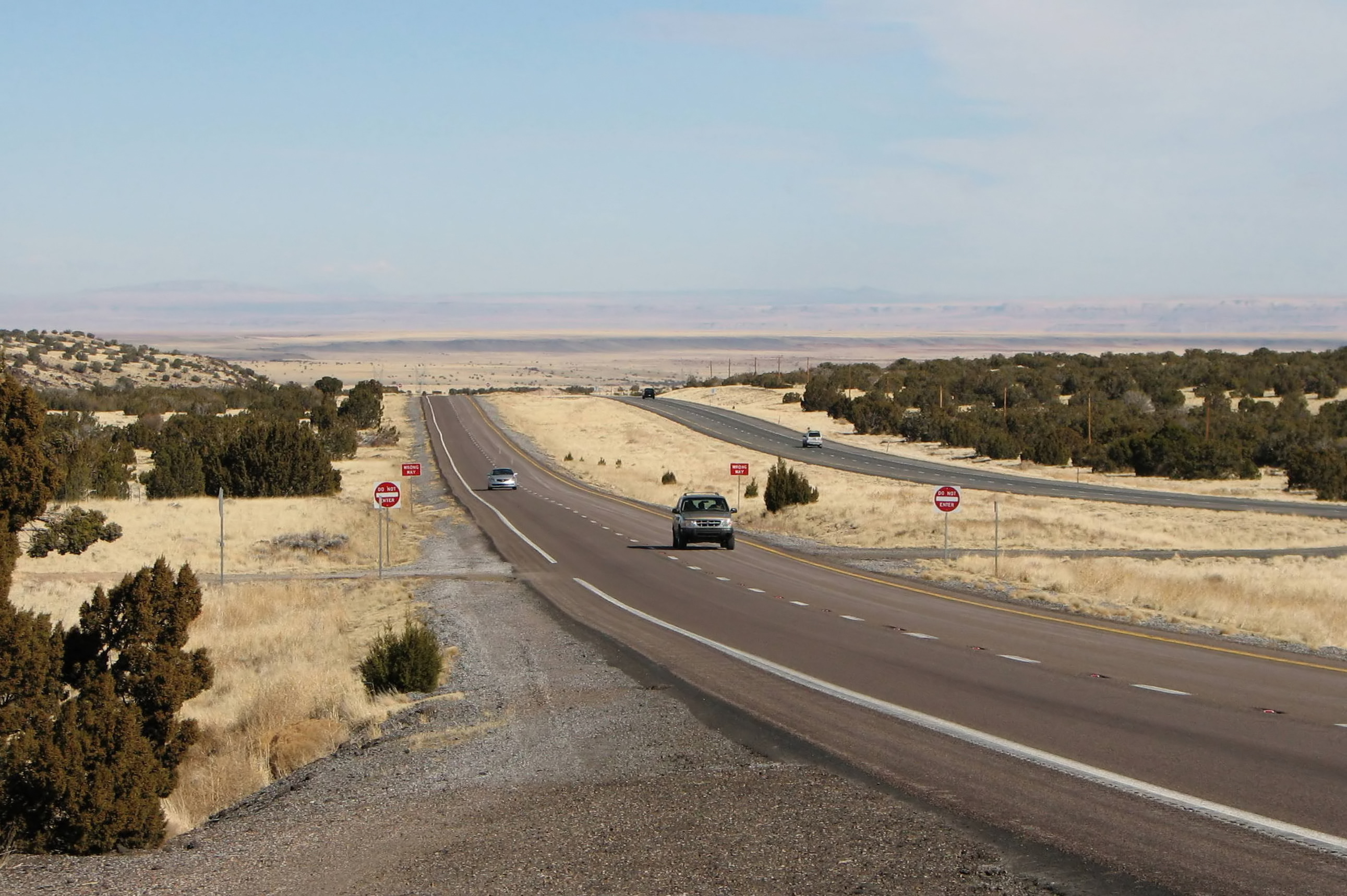
U.S. 89 near Flagstaff

U.S. Route 89 (US 89) is a U.S. Highway in the U.S. state of Arizona that begins in Flagstaff and heads north to the Utah border northwest of Page. US 89 is among the first U.S. Highways established in Arizona between November 11, 1926, and September 9, 1927. Until 1992, US 89 started at the international border in Nogales and was routed through Tucson, Phoenix and Prescott between Nogales and Flagstaff. State Route 79 and State Route 89 are both former sections of US 89.

== Route description ==
US 89 begins at a junction with I-40 Bus. / US 180 in the city of Flagstaff, Arizona. The highway proceeds northeast, passing by suburban development and the San Francisco Peaks to the west. The highway then continues north through forested areas near Coconino National Forest and Sunset Crater Volcano National Monument.

US 89 progresses north through sparsely populated desert areas. The highway passes through the community of Gray Mountain before entering the Navajo Nation. In the town of Cameron, the highway passes local businesses before intersecting with AZ 64, the highway that leads to the east entrance of Grand Canyon National Park. After the traffic circle with AZ 64, the road crosses over the Little Colorado River next to the decommissioned Cameron Suspension Bridge, which carried US 89 until 1959.

The highway continues through unpopulated areas of the Navajo Nation, intersecting with the western terminus of US 160 near Tuba City. North of Tuba City, US 89 closely parallels the western edge of the Echo Cliffs. In Bitter Springs, the highway splits into US 89 and US Route 89A, with the latter road continuing to the west towards Kanab, Utah, where the two routes rejoin. Mainline US 89 proceeds northeast, ascending the Echo Cliffs towards Page, Arizona.

Near Page, the highway passes near Horseshoe Bend and Antelope Canyon before meeting the western terminus of AZ 98. It continues past hotels and local businesses before abruptly turning to the west, crossing over the Colorado River on the Glen Canyon Dam Bridge just south of the Glen Canyon Dam and Lake Powell. The road travels northwest, passing through Glen Canyon National Recreation Area before entering Utah.

== History ==
U.S. Route 89 (US 89) was one of the original routes of the United States Numbered Highway System, as established on November 11, 1926. The designation was formally approved by the Arizona State Highway Department on September 9, 1927, with the establishment of the numbered state highway system. Prior to the formal establishment of the U.S. Highway System, the original US 89 proposal had the highway end at proposed US 60 (which was ultimately designated as US 66) in Flagstaff. Between Phoenix and Ash Fork, the route was proposed as US 280. The route from Nogales to Tucson was proposed as US 380. Between Tucson and Phoenix, the route was to be served by US 80, where US 60 would be designated between Ash Fork and Flagstaff. Ultimately, the original plans never came to fruition when the system was approved, with US 280 and US 380 never being commissioned. US 89 was designated in place of the canceled designations, maintaining a concurrency with US 66 between Ash Fork and Flagstaff, as well as a concurrency with US 80 between Tucson and Phoenix.

The original route of US 89 began at the international border in Nogales. US 89 ran concurrently with Interstate 19 (I-19) until Green Valley. The route was taken (in a northerly direction) through Tucson via 6th Avenue, Congress Street, and Granada Avenue. The route was carried out of Tucson via State Route 77 (SR 77). Further north, it was carried via the Pinal Pioneer Parkway northwest out of Oracle Junction on SR 79. In Maricopa County, it ran concurrently with existing US 60 along Main Street in Mesa, Apache Boulevard and Mill Avenue in Tempe, then along Van Buren Street in Phoenix to Grand Avenue, then to Wickenburg. Departing Wickenburg, it followed US 93 and SR 89 to Prescott. Departing Prescott, the route followed present-day SR 89 to Ash Fork, then ran east concurrently with I-40 to Flagstaff. In Flagstaff, US 89 ran concurrently with former US 66, Milton Road and Santa Fe Avenue. The highway crossed the Little Colorado River at Cameron on the Cameron Suspension Bridge until 1959, when the bridge was retired and replaced by a parallel span.

Nogales was maintained as the southern terminus of US 89 until June 13, 1992. On this date, the American Association of State Highway and Transportation Officials (AASHTO), the authority regulating interstate highway designations, approved a request by the Arizona Department of Transportation (ADOT) to truncate the highway to US 180 and I-40 Business in Flagstaff. Currently, I-19, I-10 and I-17 respectively, serve as the major highway corridor between Nogales and Flagstaff. Major sections of US 89, not concurrent with I-19, US 60 or I-40, were redesignated as part of SR 77, as well as the entirety of both SR 79 and SR 89.

On February 20, 2013, the main alignment of US 89 was closed in both directions approximately 25 miles (40 km) south of Page due to a landslide that caused the roadway to buckle and subside. Traffic was re-routed via 45 miles (72 km) of secondary and tertiary roads on the Navajo Reservation. Alternate routes were also suggested through Las Vegas, Nevada, or Hurricane, Utah, and Marble Canyon (US 89A). US 89T (see below) opened in August 2013 as a bypass of the closed section, utilizing Navajo Route 20 as an alignment. U.S. 89 reopened in March 2015 after a $25 million repair project.

== Major intersections ==
The entire route is in Coconino County.

Location	mi	km	Destinations	Notes
Flagstaff	418.37	673.30	BL 40 / US 180 to I-17 / I-40 – Phoenix, Albuquerque	National southern terminus; former interchange, now at-grade T-intersection; highway continues west as I-40 BL/US 180 (former US 89 south)
Doney Park	420.2	676.2	South end state maintenance at Flagstaff city limits	
Cameron	465.21	748.68	SR 64 west – Grand Canyon	Roundabout; eastern terminus of SR 64
	480.80	773.77	US 160 east – Tuba City, Kayenta	Western terminus of US 160
Bitter Springs	524.01	843.31	US 89A north – Jacob Lake, Fredonia	Southern terminus of US 89A; former US 89 north
Page	546.20	879.02	SR 98 east – Kayenta, Antelope Point	Western terminus of SR 98
Page	556.84	896.15	US 89 north	Continuation into Utah
1.000 mi = 1.609 km; 1.000 km = 0.621 mi

== U.S. Route 89T ==
U.S. Route 89T
- Location: The Gap–Page
- Length: 46.17 mi (74.30 km)
- Existed: 2013–2015

Navajo Route 20
- Location: The Gap–Page
- Length: 43.57 mi (70.12 km)

U.S. Route 89T (US 89T or US 89X) was the designation for Navajo Route 20 (N20), a road running mostly parallel to US 89 in Coconino County, Arizona. Added to the Arizona state highway system in 2013, US 89T served as a temporary detour for a closed section of US 89. The route was 46.17 miles (74.30 km) long.

The need for US 89T arose in February 2013, when a geological event caused a 150-foot (46 m) stretch of US 89 to buckle. The site of the road damage was about 3 miles (4.8 km) north of Bitter Springs and the US 89A junction with US 89 and about 25 miles (40 km) south of Page. The loss of this stretch of road forced detours for traffic entering the Page area from the south. The Navajo Nation declared a state of emergency. Motorists were rerouted on a 115-mile (185 km) detour via US 160 and SR 98 or a 90-mile (145 km) detour on N20, which had a 28-mile (45 km) unpaved stretch. As a result, commute times into Page increased, and merchants in Page and the surrounding area lost significant business.

The Arizona Department of Transportation (ADOT) added the road to the state highway system as US 89T and quickly moved to get money ($35 million from the Federal Highway Administration's emergency relief project fund) and equipment to pave the road. As the Navajo had wanted to pave N20 for decades, and some design and environmental clearances had already been obtained, it took just 79 days to pave N20 in a project that might have otherwise taken more than a year. In addition to pavement, right-of-way and fencing to separate the road from the local livestock population were required. The improved road opened to traffic on August 29, 2013. Plans called for the road to be used for three years before the road reverted to Bureau of Indian Affairs jurisdiction.

Initially, the route lacked proper fencing, cattle guards, and pavement markings to support safe travel at higher speeds. As a result, US 89T was open to local traffic only at night, and posted speed limits as low as 25 miles per hour (40 km/h). As of October 15, US 89T restrictions were lifted following the installation of upgraded control features.

With the reopening of mainline US 89 in March 2015, the US 89T designation was retired and ownership of the route returned to the Navajo Nation in April 2015. The route from The Gap to SR 98 is currently designated only as N20.

Major intersections

The entire route was in Coconino County.

Location	mi	km	Destinations	Notes
The Gap	0.000	0.000	US 89 north to US 89A north – Page, Jacob Lake, Fredonia US 89 south to US 160 east – Flagstaff N20 begins	T intersection; southern terminus of US 89T; current southern terminus of N20; southern end of N20 concurrency
	7.872	12.669	N21 north (Kaibito Road) – Kaibito	T intersection; southern end of N21
Page	43.570	70.119	SR 98 east to US 160 – Kayenta; Coppermine Road north – South Lake Powell Boulevard N20 ends	Northern end of N20; northern end of N20 concurrency; southern end of SR 98 concurrency
Page	46.174	74.310	US 89 north – Glen Canyon Dam, Kanab (Utah) US 89 south to US 89A north – Page SR 98 ends	T intersection; northern terminus of US 89T; northern end of SR 98 concurrency
1.000 mi = 1.609 km; 1.000 km = 0.621 mi: Concurrency terminus

== See also ==
- U.S. Route 89A
- Arizona State Route 89
- Arizona State Route 89A

U.S. Route 89
Previous state: Terminus	Arizona	Next state: Utah
