= Tutuveni =

Archaeological site in Arizona, United States

- U.S. National Register of Historic Places
- Location within Arizona Location within the United States
- Location: Coconino County, Arizona
- Nearest city: Cameron, Arizona
- Coordinates: 36.1571373°N 111.3806290°W
- NRHP reference No.: 86003283
- Added to NRHP: December 3, 1986

Tutuveni is a prehistoric petroglyph site at the base of Echo Cliffs in Coconino County, Arizona. The Hopi, who have historic interest in this site, refer to it as "Tutuveni" meaning "Newspaper Rock". The site was used by young Hopi men during their ceremonial pilgrimages to Ongtupqa (the Grand Canyon) to mark their passage into adulthood. They would stop and camp at the site and would etch their clan symbols onto the rocks, showing their participation and passage in that pilgrimage. This was a tradition that was carried on for four to five centuries by the Hopi. Although the site is recognized as a Hopi traditional cultural property, it is located on land now owned by the Navajo Nation. There was therefore a decades-old dispute whereby the neighboring tribes fought over the ownership of the land. The conflict was resolved in 2006, with much of the disputed 1.5 million acres going to the Navajos.

== Clan petroglyphs ==
The site contains more than 5,000 Hopi clan symbols, dating from perhaps as early as 1200 to the 1950s, inscribed on eight sandstone boulders. The boulders are scattered over an area of approximately 65,000 square feet (6,000 m^{2}), the tallest of which may reached over 5 meters. These petroglyphs cover the sides and tops of the boulders, and most of the symbols, 60% of the total, are on one stone known as boulder 48. The petroglyphs, each around 10x10cm, are of iconic symbols representing animals, plants, or cultural items. The unusual features of these symbols compared to other petroglyphs sites are that the symbols rarely overlap, and they may be arranged as rows of repeating images of up to 20 or more in a line. These repeated image may be from members of the same clan making the same pilgrimage to Tutuveni – new pilgrims would then put their symbols next to the symbols the previous Hopi pilgrims.

The site however has suffered from vandalism, with graffiti added to the boulders and some symbols were erased or spray-painted over. As a result, fencing had been introduced and surveillance cameras installed.

== See also ==
- Newspaper Rock State Historic Monument in Utah
- Newspaper Rock Petroglyphs Archeological District in Apache County, Arizona
