= U.S. Route 160 in Arizona =

Section of U.S. Numbered Highway in Arizona, United States

U.S. Route 160
- Navajo Trail
- US 160 highlighted in red

Route information
- Maintained by ADOT
- Length: 159.35 mi (256.45 km)
- Existed: June 29, 1970–present
- History: Designated as US 164 from 1965 to 1970

Major junctions
- West end: US 89 near Cameron
- US 163 in Kayenta; US 191 at Mexican Water; US 64 in Teec Nos Pos
- East end: US 160 at New Mexico state line near Four Corners National Monument

Location
- Country: United States
- State: Arizona
- Counties: Coconino, Navajo, Apache

Highway system
- United States Numbered Highway System; List; Special; Divided; Arizona State Highway System; Interstate; US; State; Scenic Proposed; Former
| ← SR 160 | US 160 | → US 164 |
| ← US 160 | US 164 | → SR 166 |

U.S. Route 160 (US 160), also known as the Navajo Trail, is a U.S. Highway which travels west to east across the Navajo Nation and Northeast Arizona for 159.35 miles (256.45 km). US 160 begins at a junction with US 89 north of Cameron and exits the state into New Mexico south of the Four Corners Monument. Along its journey, the route connects the communities of Tuba City, Moenkopi, Rare Metals, Tonalea, Tsegi, Kayenta, Dennehotso, Mexican Water, Red Mesa, and Teec Nos Pos.

Most of what is now US 160 was constructed as Navajo Route 1 between 1959 and 1962, and carried part of State Route 64 (SR 64) and the entirety of SR 364 between 1961 and 1965. From 1965 to 1970, the entire route of present day US 160 was designated as US 164, until US 160 was moved from its original alignment between Utah and Colorado, onto the entirety of US 164 between Arizona and Colorado.

== Route description ==
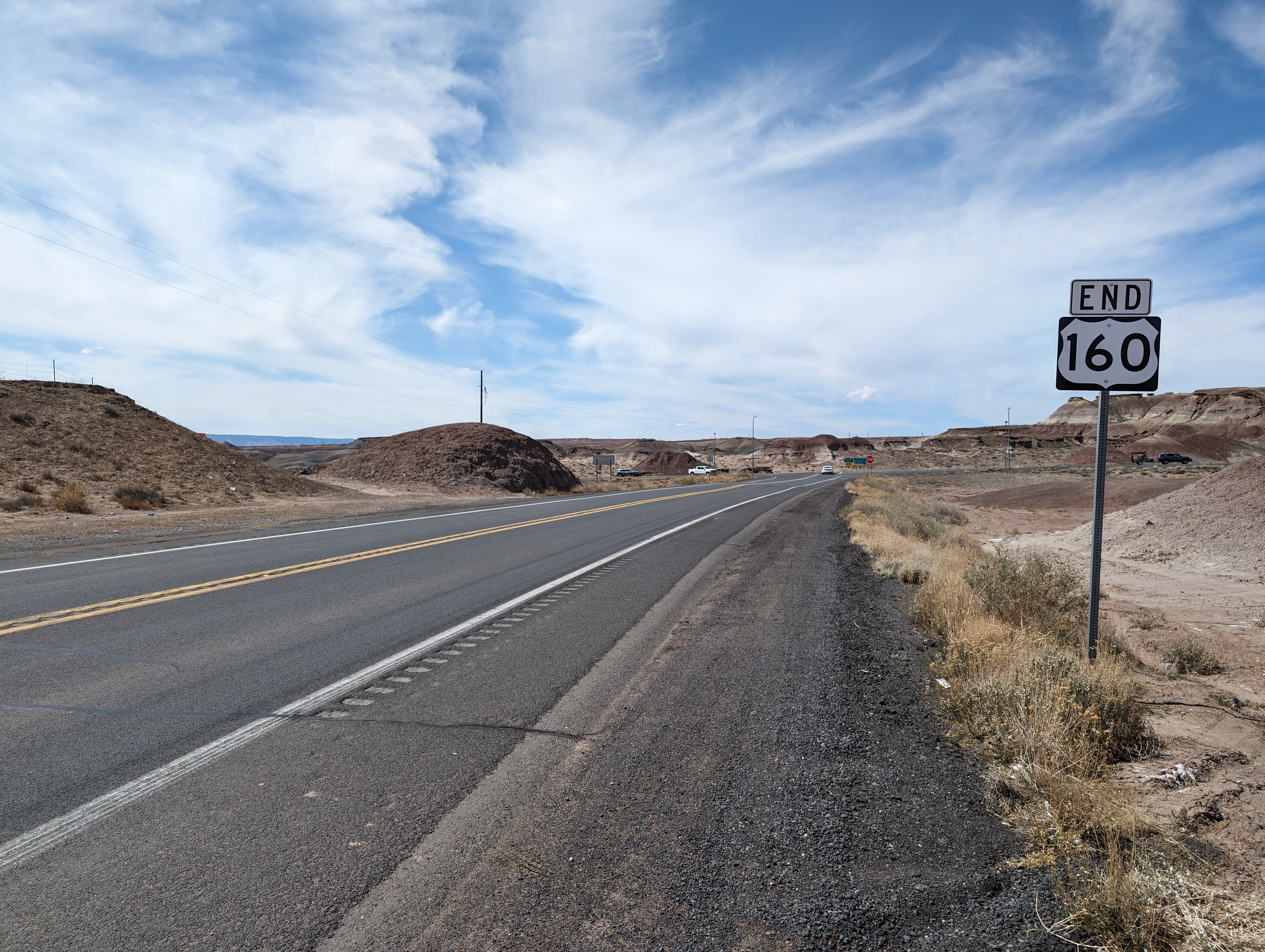
Western terminus near Tuba City

The vast majority of U.S. Route 160 (US 160) through Arizona runs through rural and sparsely populated sections. As a result, the road is entirely two-lane except two short four-lane sections in Tuba City and Kayenta. US 160 begins at a junction with US 89 north of Cameron within the Navajo Nation. US 160 continues east past the Tuba City Airport as a paved two-lane arterial road. The highway curves to the north, east of the airport, scaling the western edge of a large ridge, before turning to the east, crossing over the ridge. East of the ridge, US 160 continues due east into Tuba City, briefly turning to the northeast, before meeting the western terminus of State Route 264 (SR 264) at a traffic light intersection with Main Street.

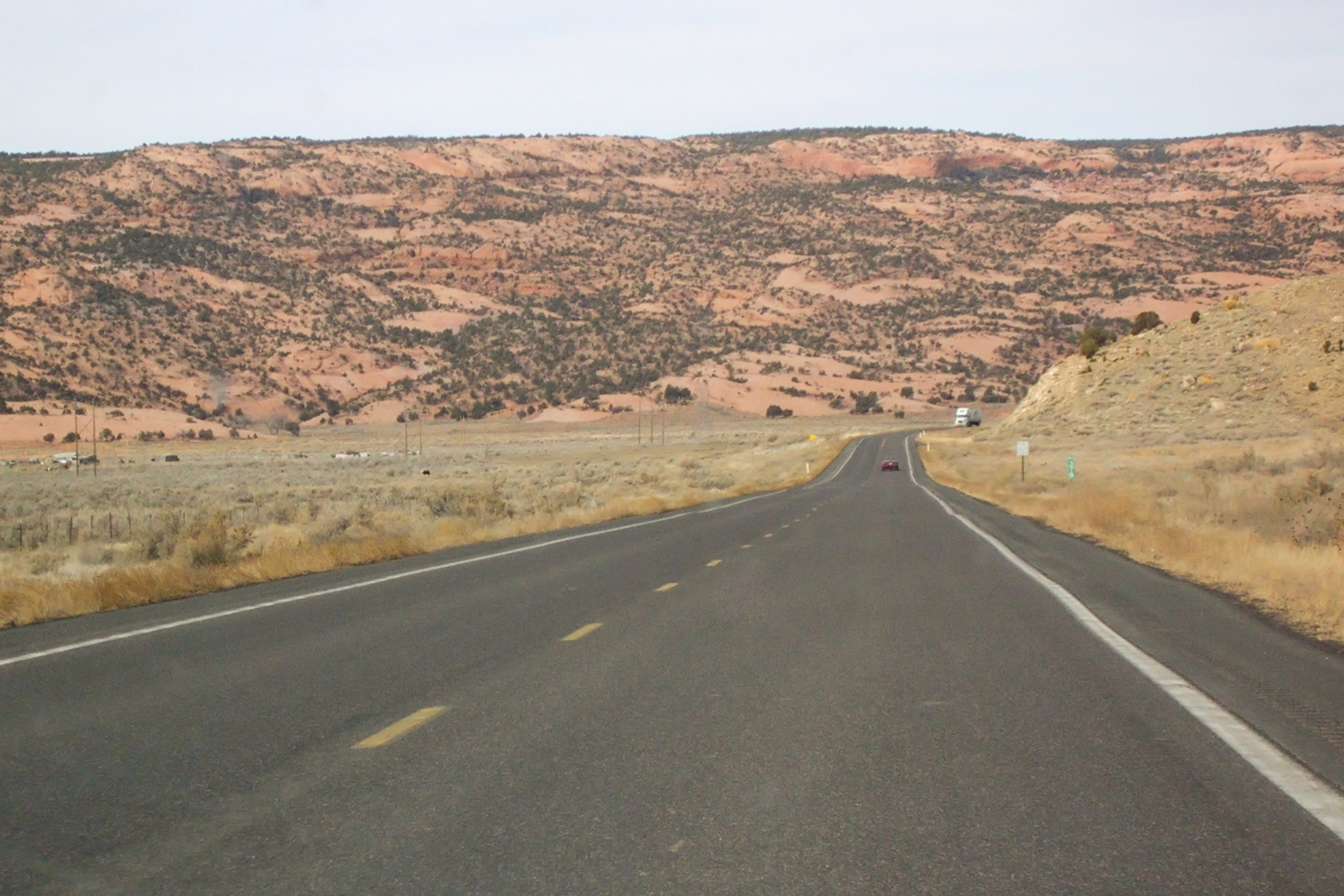
US 160 near Tsegi Canyon, west of Kayenta

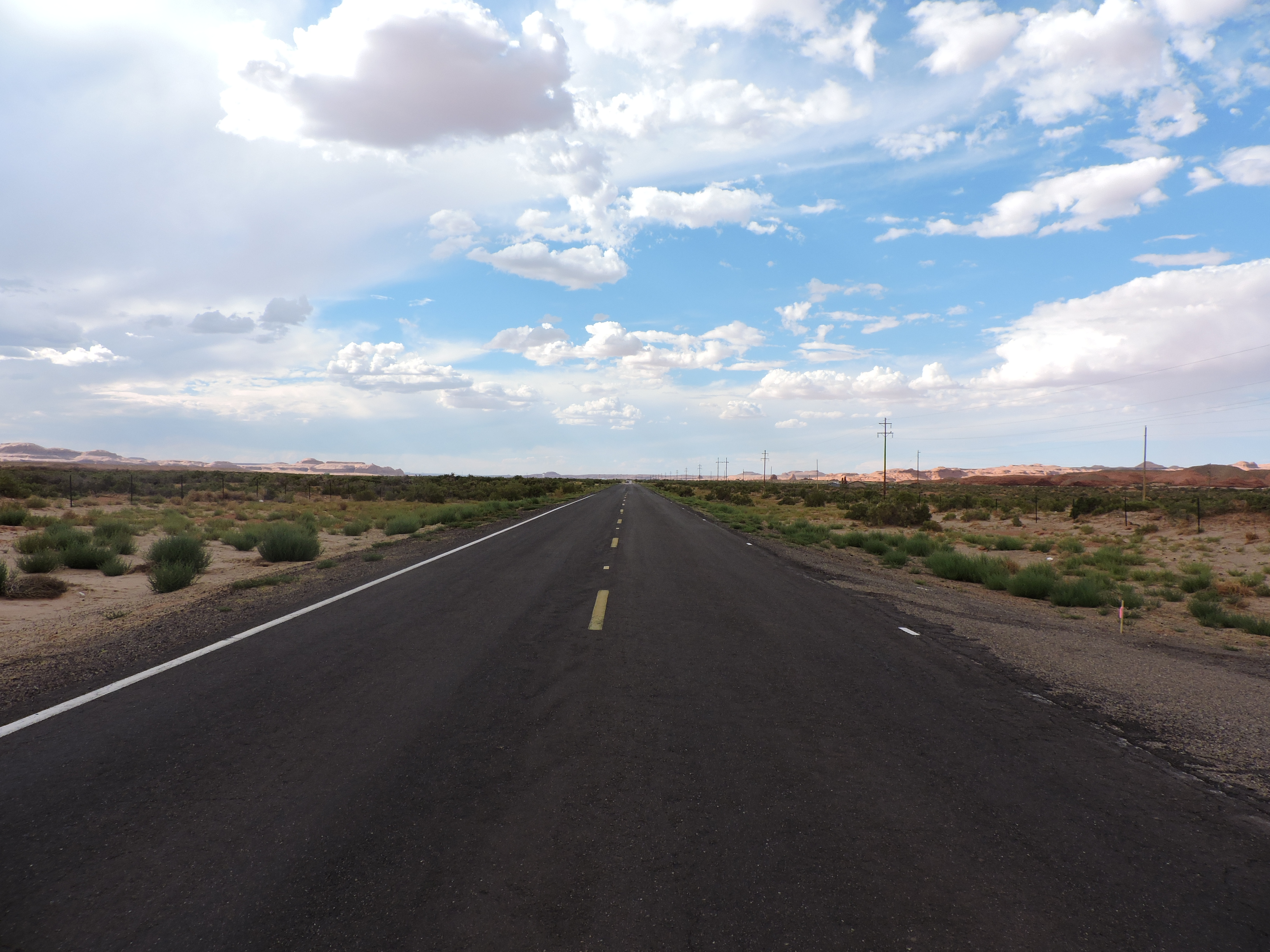
US 160 near Dennehotso

After the junction with SR 264, US 160 continues east to the edge of town, then heads northeast, and passes through Tonalea. The small community is the location of a natural landmark known as the "Elephant's Feet", which comprises two small layered stone buttes directly bordering the northern edge of the highway. East of Tonalea, US 160 parallels the disused tracks of the Black Mesa and Lake Powell Railroad. Just south of Shonto, US 160 arrives at the eastern terminus of SR 98 at a four-way intersection. Northeast of the SR 98 junction, US 160 skirts the base of Black Mesa on the south side of the highway, passing Navajo National Monument and SR 564 through Tsegi and past Tsegi Canyon. US 160 stops paralleling the tracks of the Black Mesa and Lake Powell Railroad, which end at a loop west of Tsegi.

West of Kayenta, the highway assumes an east-by-northeast direction into the town. US 160 meets the southern terminus of US 163 at a four-way intersection. Immediately east of US 163, the highway passes the southern edge of Kayenta Airport. At the intersection with Navajo Route 59 (N59) near Church Rock Valley, US 160 turns to the northeast, passing through Dennehotso and crossing a bridge over Laguña Creek. The highway curves east just before crossing a bridge over Chinle Creek. The remainder of US 160 roughly parallels the Utah state line east of Chinle Creek. Just east of Chinle Creek, US 160 passes Mexican Water, then reaches a junction with US 191.

East of Mexican Water, US 160 and US 191 share a short concurrency to the southern terminus of N12, where US 191 turns north towards Utah, running concurrent with N12. US 160 continues northeast, then curves east through Red Mesa. East of a junction with N35, US 160 turns southeast. The highway gently curves back to the northeast, before making a sharp curve heading southeast again, meeting the western terminus of US 64 at a three-way intersection in Teec Nos Pos. US 64 continues straight ahead from the intersection, where US 160 turns to the left, heading north-by-northeast, before curving northeast and crossing into New Mexico near Four Corners Monument.

== History ==
U.S. Route 164
- Location: Flagstaff to New Mexico
- Length: 217.40 mi (349.87 km)
- Existed: 1966–1970

Navajo Route 1
- Location: US 89 to New Mexico
- Existed: 1958–1961

The current routing of US 160 was originally designated as Navajo Route 1 (N1) in late 1958, but had yet to be constructed east of Tuba City. Also known as the Navajo Trail, the route was slated to run from U.S. Route 89 (US 89) to the Arizona–New Mexico state line near the Four Corners Monument. The first contract for the construction of N1 past Tuba City was awarded by the Bureau of Indian Affairs (BIA) on July 3, 1959 to the C.R. Davis Contracting Company based in Albuquerque, New Mexico. The contracted stipulated C.R. Davis would construct 9 miles (14 kilometres) of highway northeast of Tuba City at a total cost of $393,202. Another contract to construct a further 10 miles (16 kilometres) of N1 northeast of Tuba City towards Kayenta was awarded in December 1960. On September 9, 1961, the route between US 89 and Teec Nos Pos became a state highway as part of Arizona State Route 64 (SR 64). The reconstructed segment from Teec Nos Pos to the New Mexico state line became SR 364 on September 9, 1961.

On September 12, 1962, a ribbon cutting ceremony was held at Four Corners Monument on September 16, 1962, marking the completion of SR 64 and SR 364 between US 89 and the Arizona–New Mexico border, as well as the continuation of the Navajo Trail into New Mexico and Colorado, before ending at US 666. The ceremony also marked the completion of the Four Corners Monument for motor tourism. Secretary of the Interior Stewart Lee Udall attended the ceremony, as did Governor George Clyde of Utah, Governor Paul Fannin of Arizona, Governor Edwin Mechem of New Mexico, and Governor Stephen McNichols of Colorado were present at the ceremony, joined by Tribal Council members of the Navajo Nation and their families.

On October 1, 1965, most of SR 64 and all of SR 364 became part of the U.S. Highway System, when the American Association of State Highway Officials (AASHO) approved the highway from US 89 to Four Corners as part of U.S. Route 164 (US 164). Nationally, US 164 encompassed the entire length of the Navajo Trail between US 666 in Colorado and US 89 in Arizona, as well as running concurrently with US 89 southwest to a western terminus at US 66 near Flagstaff. June 29, 1970, all of US 164 became a re-routing of US 160 west of Cortez, Colorado. Up to that point, US 160 had not entered Arizona and instead ended at US 6 and US 50 in Crescent Junction, Utah. However, the US 160 designation was only applied to the junction with US 89 north of Flagstaff, with the remainder of US 164 concurrent with US 89 to Flagstaff being removed entirely.

== Major intersections ==
| County | Location | mi | km | Destinations | Notes |
|---|---|---|---|---|---|
| Coconino | | 311.460 | 501.246 | US 89 – Page, Flagstaff, Grand Canyon | Western terminus; former US 164 south |
| Coconino | Moenkopi–Tuba City line | 321.812 | 517.906 | SR 264 – Keams Canyon | Western terminus of SR 264 |
| Navajo | | 361.622 | 581.974 | SR 98 west – Page | Eastern terminus of SR 98 |
| Navajo | | 374.276 | 602.339 | SR 564 north | Southern terminus of AZ 564 |
| Navajo | Kayenta | 393.551 | 633.359 | US 163 north – Kayenta, Mexican Hat, Monument Valley | Southern terminus of US 163 |
| Apache | | 434.825 | 699.783 | US 191 south – Ganado | West end of US 191 overlap; former SR 63 |
| Apache | | 437.061 | 703.381 | US 191 north (BIA Route 12 to US 191) – Utah, Bluff | East end of US 191 overlap |
| Apache | Teec Nos Pos | 465.405 | 748.997 | US 64 east – Shiprock | Western terminus of US 64; former SR 504 east |
| Apache | | 470.730 | 757.567 | US 160 east – Cortez, Four Corners National Monument | Continuation into New Mexico; former US 164 east |
1.000 mi = 1.609 km; 1.000 km = 0.621 mi: Concurrency terminus

== See also ==
- List of U.S. Highways in Arizona

U.S. Route 160
| Previous state: Terminus | Arizona | Next state: New Mexico |

U.S. Route 164
| Previous state: Terminus | Arizona | Next state: New Mexico |
