= U.S. Route 180 =

Numbered Highway in the United States

U.S. Route 180
- US 180 highlighted in red

Route information
- Auxiliary route of US 80
- Maintained by ADOT, NMDOT and TxDOT
- Length: 1,087 mi (1,749 km)
- Existed: 1943–present

Major junctions
- West end: SR 64 at Tusayan, AZ
- US 89 at Flagstaff, AZ; I-40 from Flagstaff to Holbrook, AZ; US 191 from St. Johns to Alpine, AZ; US 60 in Springerville, AZ; US 70 at Las Cruces, NM; I-25 / US 85 at Las Cruces; I-10 at El Paso, TX; US 285 at Carlsbad, NM; US 62 at Seminole, TX; US 281 at Mineral Wells, TX
- East end: I-20 at Hudson Oaks, TX

Location
- Country: United States
- States: Arizona, New Mexico, Texas

Highway system
- United States Numbered Highway System; List; Special; Divided

U.S. Route 180 is an east–west United States highway. Like many three-digit routes, US 180 no longer meets its "parent", US 80. US 80 was decommissioned west of Mesquite, Texas, and was replaced in Texas by Interstate 20 and Interstate 10 resulting in U.S. 180 being 57 miles longer than U.S. 80. The highway's eastern terminus is in Hudson Oaks, Texas (west of Fort Worth, near Weatherford), at an intersection with Interstate 20. Its western terminus is unclear. Signage at an intersection with State Route 64 in Valle, Arizona 40 miles (64 km) northwest of Flagstaff indicates that the route starts at SR 64, which is consistent with the AASHTO U.S. Highway logs. However, many maps continue the US 180 designation to the south rim of the Grand Canyon at Grand Canyon Village. Signage at the SR 64 intersection as of 2021 indicated that US 180 continues north concurrent with the route. However, no signage along the route exists past this intersection until SR 64 turns east towards Cameron, Arizona. At this intersection, signage makes no mention of US 180 nor is there any mention at the terminus of SR 64 at US 89.

== Route description ==
Lengths
	mi	km
AZ	292	470
NM (Southwest)	248	399
TX (Trans-Pecos)	146	235
NM (Southeast)	110	180
TX (Northwest)	339	546
Total	1135	1827

Four National Parks can be accessed on the highway, Grand Canyon National Park, Petrified Forest National Park, Guadalupe Mountains National Park, and Carlsbad Caverns National Park. It also passes through the San Francisco Peaks, the highest mountains in Arizona.

=== Arizona ===
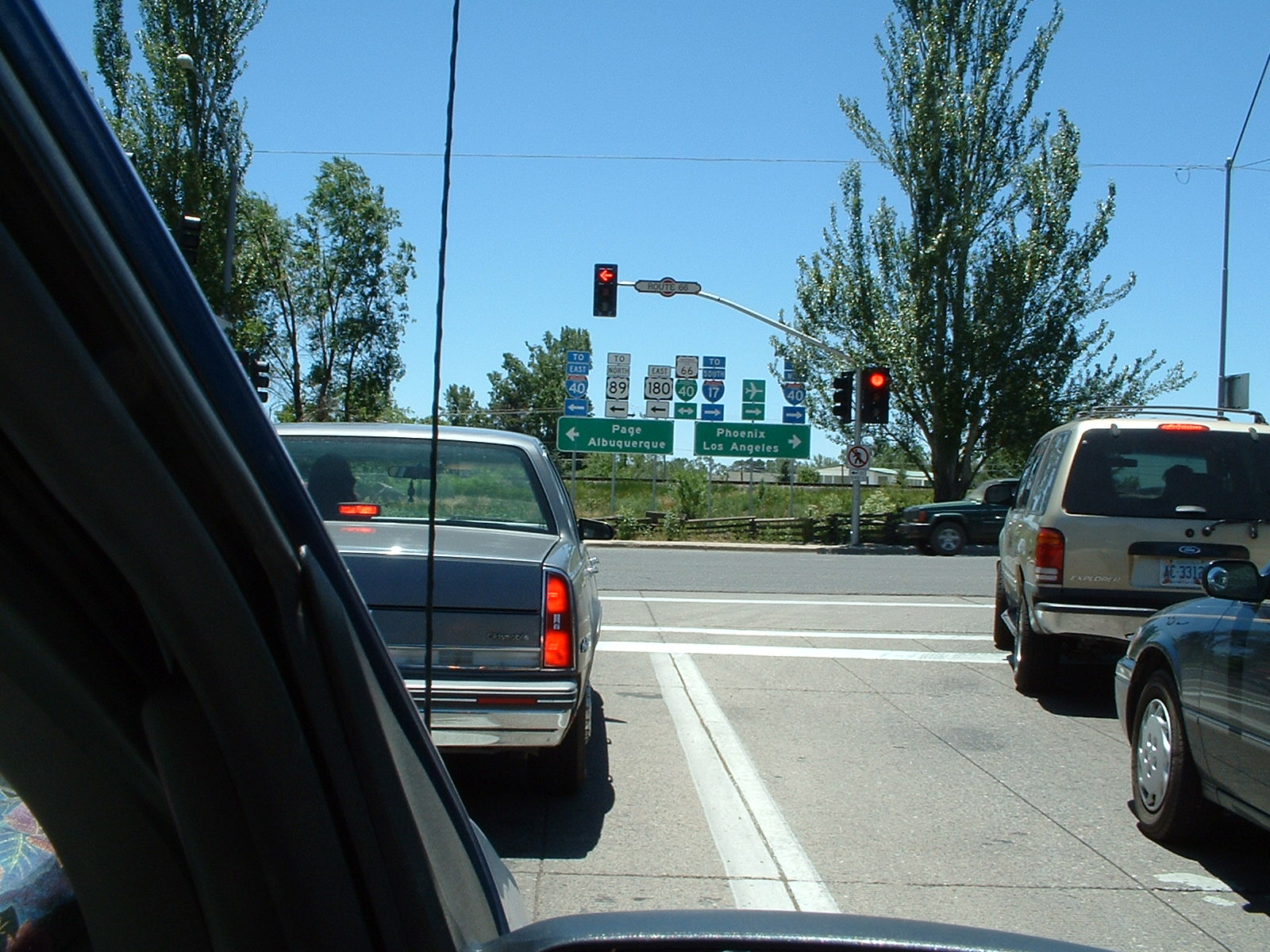
The western terminus of the I-40 Bus./US 180 concurrency in Flagstaff, Arizona

In Flagstaff, US 180 is concurrent with Interstate 40 Business and historic U.S. Route 66 for a short distance through the city. US 180 joins the former routing of Route 66 in the center of Flagstaff and follows the roadway to where it merges with Interstate 40 east of the city. From the western terminus of the overlap, the intersection with eastbound Interstate 40 is two miles (3 km) to the east, and the intersection with westbound Interstate 40 and with Interstate 17 is three miles (5 km) to the southwest.

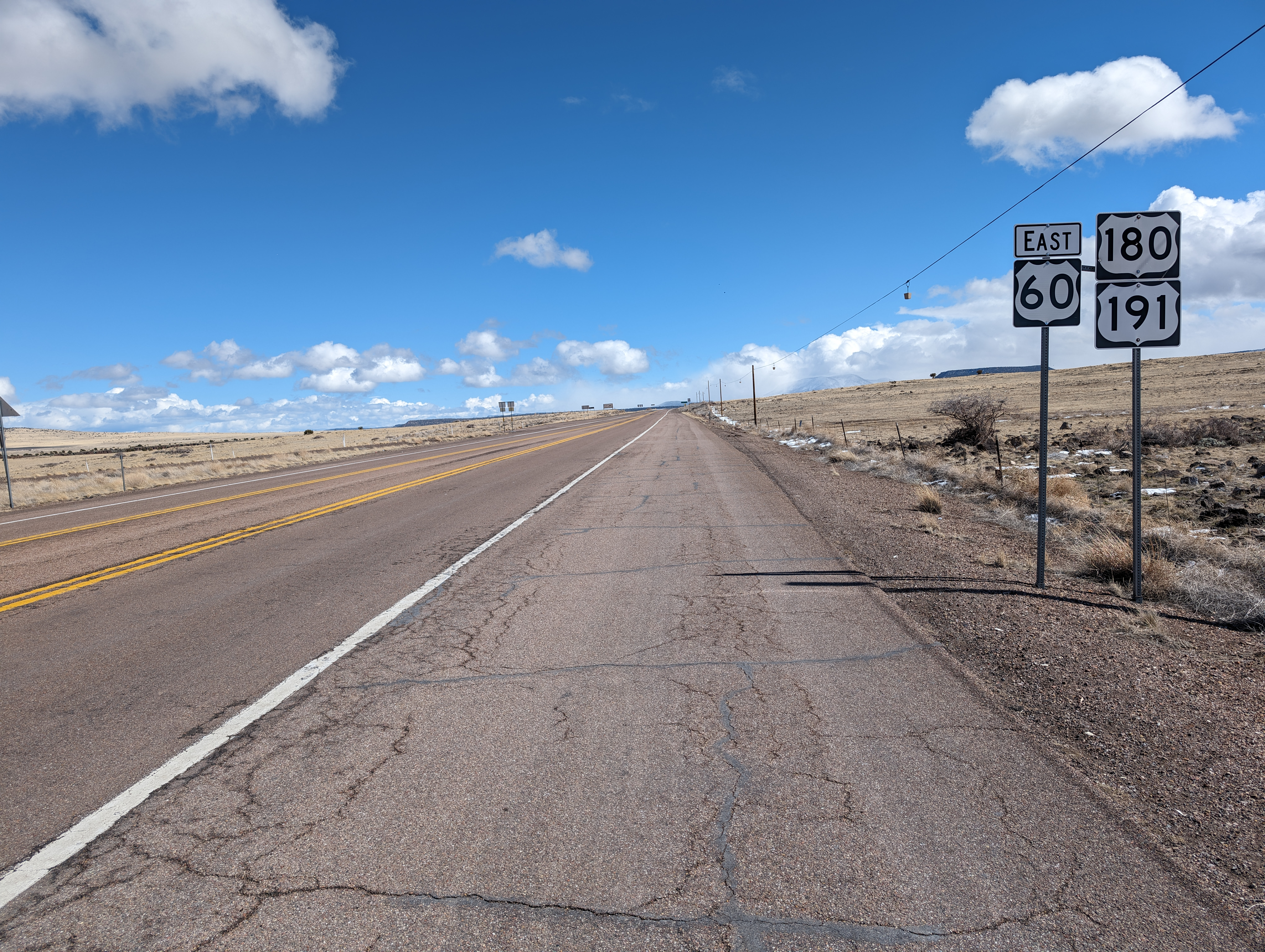
The northern side of the triple concurrency of US 60/180/191

US 180 shares numbering with Interstate 40 from Flagstaff, Arizona, to Holbrook, Arizona. At Holbrook, US 180 follows Interstate 40 Business along South Navajo Boulevard. Shortly after following South Navajo Boulevard, however, US 180 follows a south-southeast route, running by the Petrified Forest National Park and continuing South-Southeast to and through a small branch of the Zuni Indian Reservation, to St. Johns, Apache County, Arizona where it meets U.S. Route 191. After meeting up with US 191, US 180 continues south to the town of Springerville, Arizona, where the routes meet U.S. Route 60 the 3 routes begin a triple concurrency through Springerville. On the east side of Springerville US 60 leaves the concurrency and US 180 and US 191 head south through Eagar, Arizona where the two routes enter the Apache National Forest and finally split at the town of Alpine, Arizona, roughly 6 miles from the Arizona-New Mexico border.

=== New Mexico/West Texas (El Paso area) ===
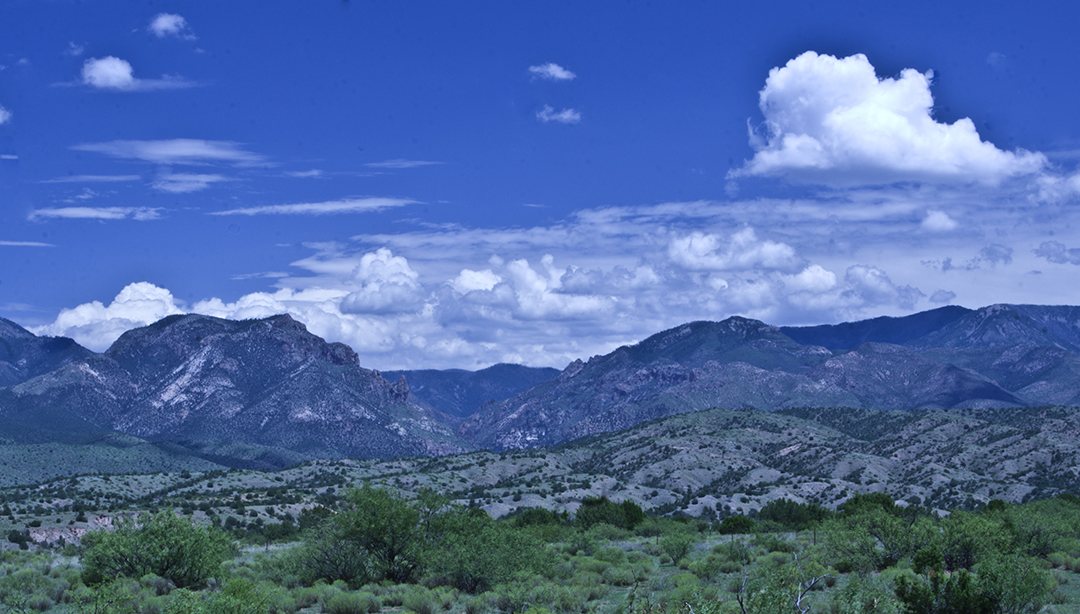
View of the Mogollon Mountains from Leopold Vista between Alpine and Silver City.

After entering New Mexico from just east of Alpine, Arizona, US 180 continues south until Silver City, New Mexico. From Silver City, US 180 travels just east for roughly 7 miles, meeting up with New Mexico State Road 90, New Mexico State Road 15, and New Mexico State Road 152. US 180 now travels southeast for roughly 50 miles (80 km) to Deming, New Mexico, where it meets up with Interstate 10. From Deming, US 180 follows Interstate 10 through Las Cruces, New Mexico, and enters Texas at Anthony, New Mexico. The route is concurrent with Interstate 10 through the west and central portions of El Paso, Texas, and separates from I-10 at Paisano Drive, joining U.S. Route 62. US 62/180 is concurrent with Montana Avenue in East Central El Paso (after the intersection with Paisano Drive), and continues to be called Montana Avenue until it reaches RM 2775 (Hueco Tanks Road). US 62/180 then travels east, going past the spur RM 2775 (which goes north to Hueco Tanks) through the southern end of the Guadalupe Mountains National Park (90 miles east of El Paso), and past the southern face of Guadalupe Peak (the highest point in Texas) towards New Mexico and Carlsbad Caverns National Park. Continuing though Carlsbad, New Mexico, US 180 and US 62 travels toward Texas running through Hobbs, New Mexico, and exiting New Mexico just east of Hobbs. US 180 used to be a two-lane highway until around 2008 but is now a divided highway in the entire state with a speed limit of 70 mph for most of the length.

=== Texas ===
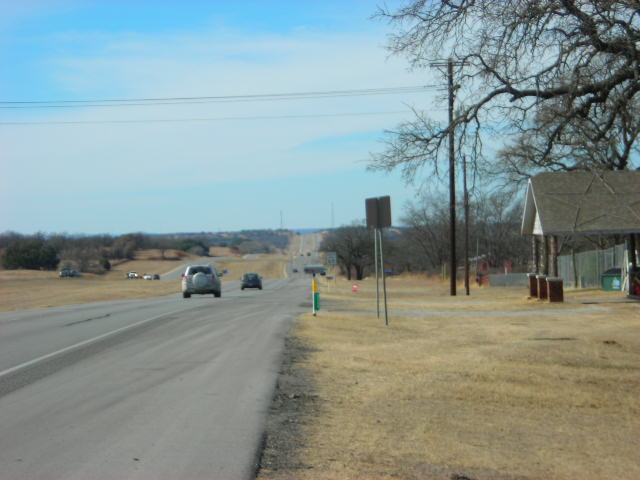
US 180 west of Weatherford, Texas

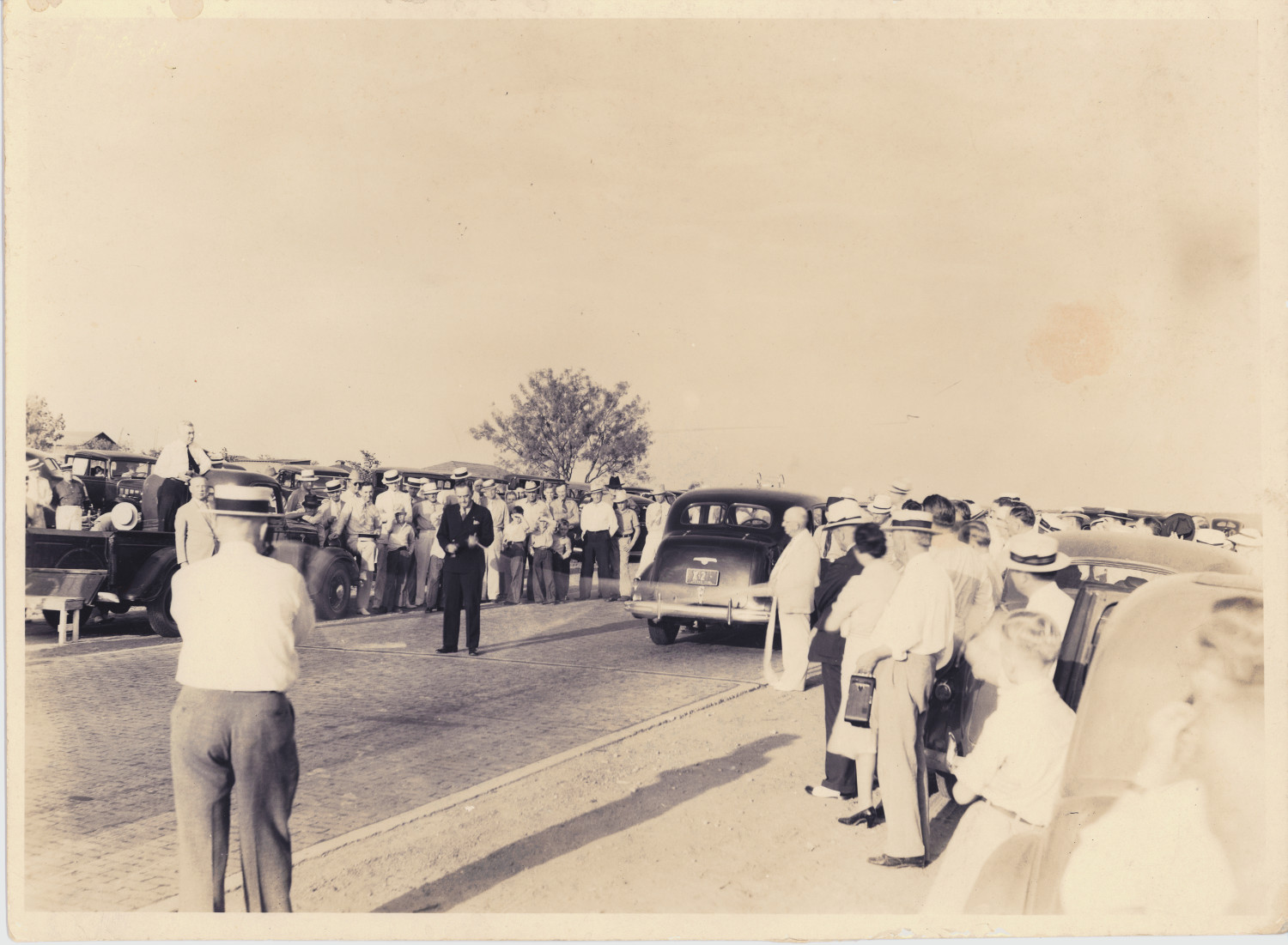
Dedication ceremony of brick-paved roadway between Mineral Wells, Texas, and Weatherford, Texas, in 1936. This stretch was designated as part of US 80 at the time.

After re-entering Texas from just east of Hobbs, New Mexico, US 180 splits from US 62 at Seminole, Texas. US 180 continues eastward running through the towns of: Lamesa, Gail, Snyder, Roby, Anson, Albany, and Breckenridge. For the last portion of its length, the road runs through the scenic Palo Pinto Mountains, exiting them at Metcalf Gap. Towns in this final portion include Palo Pinto, Mineral Wells and Cool.

US 180 comes into contact with Interstate 20 just east of Weatherford, Texas, and ends in Hudson Oaks, Texas.

In Texas, US 180 intersects U.S. Highway 385, U.S. Highway 87, U.S. Highway 84, U.S. Highway 83, U.S. Highway 277, U.S. Highway 283, U.S. Highway 183, U.S. Highway 281, and Interstate 20.

The speed limit is 75 mph in Hudspeth and Culberson counties except through Guadalupe Pass. beginning just over 1/2 mile east of mile marker 52 to the state line at FM 652.

== History ==
U.S. Route 260
- Location: Holbrook, AZ–Deming, NM
- Existed: 1930–1961

U.S. Route 260 (US 260) was a spur of U.S. Route 60, established on May 26, 1930. It connected Springerville, Arizona, and Holbrook, Arizona, replacing the former western end of US 70. US 60. On January 19, 1935, US 260 was extended eastward to US 80 near Deming, New Mexico, establishing a concurrency with US 666 from Springerville to Alpine in Arizona.

U.S. Route 180 (US 180) was originally proposed in 1943 as an extension of US 80 Alternate. At the time, US 80 Alt. ran entirely within Texas, from Abilene to Weatherford. The proposed re-routing and extension would remove US 80 Alt. between Abilene and Albany and extend the designation through New Mexico via Hobbs and Carlsbad, to US 80 in El Paso. The proposed route would be concurrent with US 62 between El Paso and Seminole. The American Association of State Highway Officials (AASHO) was willing to approve the request but recommended the route be re-designated with a different number. As a result, the highway was approved and commissioned at the 1943 AASHO Annual Meeting as US 180. On October 7, 1961, the entire route of US 260 became part of a western extension of US 180.

== Major intersections ==
Arizona
SR 64 in Tusayan
US 89 in Flagstaff
I-40 in Flagstaff. The highways travel concurrently to Holbrook.
US 191 in St. Johns. The highways travel concurrently to Alpine.
US 60 in Springerville. The highways travel concurrently through Springerville.
New Mexico
I-10 / US 70 in Deming. I-10/US 180 travels concurrently to El Paso, Texas. US 70/US 180 travels concurrently to Las Cruces.
I-25 / US 85 on the Las Cruces–University Park line. US 85/US 180 travels concurrently to El Paso, Texas.
Texas
US 54 in El Paso
I-10 / US 62 in El Paso. US 62/US 180 travels concurrently to Seminole, with a section in New Mexico in between.
New Mexico
US 285 in Carlsbad. The highways travel concurrently through Carlsbad.
Texas
US 62 / US 385 in Seminole
US 87 in Lamesa. The highways travel concurrently to south of Los Ybanez.
US 84 in Snyder
US 83 / US 277 in Anson
US 283 in Albany. The highways travel concurrently through Albany.
US 183 in Breckenridge
US 281 in Mineral Wells
I-20 in Hudson Oaks

== Related routes ==
The parent route of US 180 is U.S. Route 80 which it no longer intersects. U.S. Route 280 and U.S. Route 380 are sibling routes of US 180.

Arizona State Route 180A serves as an alternate spur of US 180 in eastern Arizona.

== See also ==
- List of United States Numbered Highways

Browse numbered routes
← SR 179	AZ	→ SR 180A
← NM 179	NM	→ NM 181
← FM 179	TX	→ SH 180
