= Arizona State Route 64 =

State highway in Arizona, United States

State Route 64
- SR 64 highlighted in red

Route information
- Maintained by ADOT
- Length: 108.31 mi (174.31 km)

Major junctions
- South end: I-40 in Williams
- US 180 in Valle
- East end: US 89 near Cameron

Location
- Country: United States
- State: Arizona

Highway system
- Arizona State Highway System; Interstate; US; State; Scenic Proposed; Former
← US 64	→ SR 65

State Route 64 (SR 64) is a 108.31-mile-long (174.31 km) state highway in the northern part of the US state of Arizona. It travels from its western terminus in Williams to its intersection with U.S. Route 89 (US 89) in Cameron.

== Route description ==
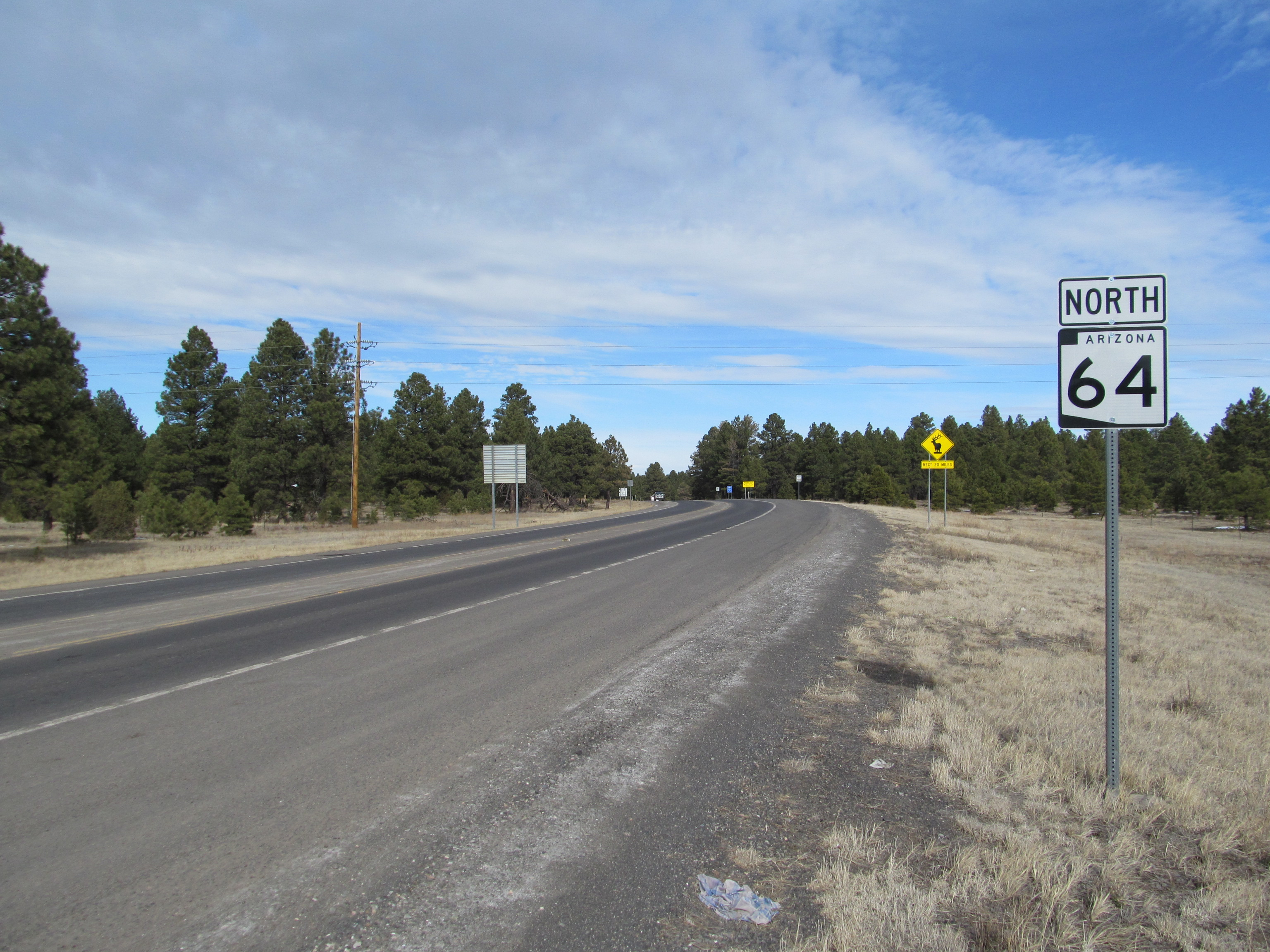
Northbound in Williams

SR 64 serves as the entrance road to the South Rim of Grand Canyon National Park; from Williams to Grand Canyon Village, the highway travels from the south to north, and from Grand Canyon Village to Cameron, it travels from the west to the east. While the road is technically not considered a state highway within national park boundaries, as it is maintained there by the National Park Service and not the Arizona Department of Transportation, it is marked as SR 64 on most maps and is considered unbroken for the purposes of numbering in the Arizona state highway system. SR 64 formerly extended past Cameron through to Teec Nos Pos; this designation has been superseded by US 160.

From Tusayan to Valle, the highway travels concurrent with US 180; segments of the highway are also known as Navahopi Road, Rim Drive, and Bushmaster Memorial Highway.

== History ==
SR 64 was first designated as a state highway in 1932 as a route from Williams to the Grand Canyon.

The road from the South Rim of Grand Canyon National Park to Cameron, Arizona was known as the Nava Hopi Road in 1924. At that time it was a rough and steep dirt road. In 1928 the Nava Hopi Road was still in poor condition due to lack of maintenance. At the same time, tourists were encouraged to take a day trip drive from the El Tovar Hotel at the South Rim to today’s Moenkopi, Arizona and back via the Nava Hopi Road and the Cameron Suspension Bridge crossing of the Little Colorado River. After the opening of the Grand Canyon Bridge (today’s Navajo Bridge) in January 1929, use increased but the road was still in poor shape in 1931. Only “experienced mountain drivers” were encouraged to take the road. From 1931 through 1934 the Nava Hopi Road was upgraded considerably. Traffic was not greatly inconvenienced by the work. Upgrades included the completion of the steel frame and concrete decked Dead Indian Canyon Bridge and the road was now a high gear (meaning fast) road called the Nava Hopi Highway. In 1961, the highway was extended further east from US 89 through Tuba City to the New Mexico state line. In 1965, the portion from Teec Nos Pos was renumbered to SR 504 to match New Mexico, which would be renumbered again in 1987 to US 64. In 1965, the section to the east of US 89 became US 164, and would later be renumbered to US 160 in 1969.

== Junction list ==
The entire route is in Coconino County.

Location	mi	km	Destinations	Notes
Williams	0.00	0.00	I-40 / Historic US 66 – Flagstaff, Los Angeles, Williams	Counterclockwise terminus; I-40 exit 165; road continues west as Historic US 66 (former BL 40)
Valle	27.83	44.79	US 180 east – Flagstaff	Western terminus of US 180
Grand Canyon NP	51.98	83.65	South entrance station	Clockwise end of state maintenance
Grand Canyon NP	80.59	129.70	East entrance station	Counterclockwise end of state maintenance
Cameron	108.31	174.31	US 89 – Page, Flagstaff	Roundabout; clockwise terminus
1.000 mi = 1.609 km; 1.000 km = 0.621 mi: Tolled

== Spur route ==
State Route 64 Spur
- Location: Grand Canyon National Park Airport
- Length: 0.36 mi (580 m)
- Existed: 1974–1999

State Route 64 Spur (SR 64 Spur) was an unsigned 0.36-mile (0.58 km) long auxiliary route of SR 64, connecting its parent highway to Grand Canyon National Park Airport. The route was commissioned by the Arizona Department of Transportation on September 6, 1974. On September 17, 1999, SR 64 Spur was decommissioned and handed over to the airport authority for maintenance. Today, the route of former SR 64 Spur is known as Corsair Drive and Flying Fortress Drive.

=== Major intersections ===
The entire route was in Grand Canyon, Coconino County.

mi	km	Destinations	Notes
0.00	0.00	SR 64 / US 180 – Grand Canyon, Flagstaff, Williams	Southern terminus; milepost 234.61
0.36	0.58	Airport Road	Northern terminus; milepost 234.97
1.000 mi = 1.609 km; 1.000 km = 0.621 mi
