= Dead Indian Canyon Bridge =

- U.S. National Register of Historic Places
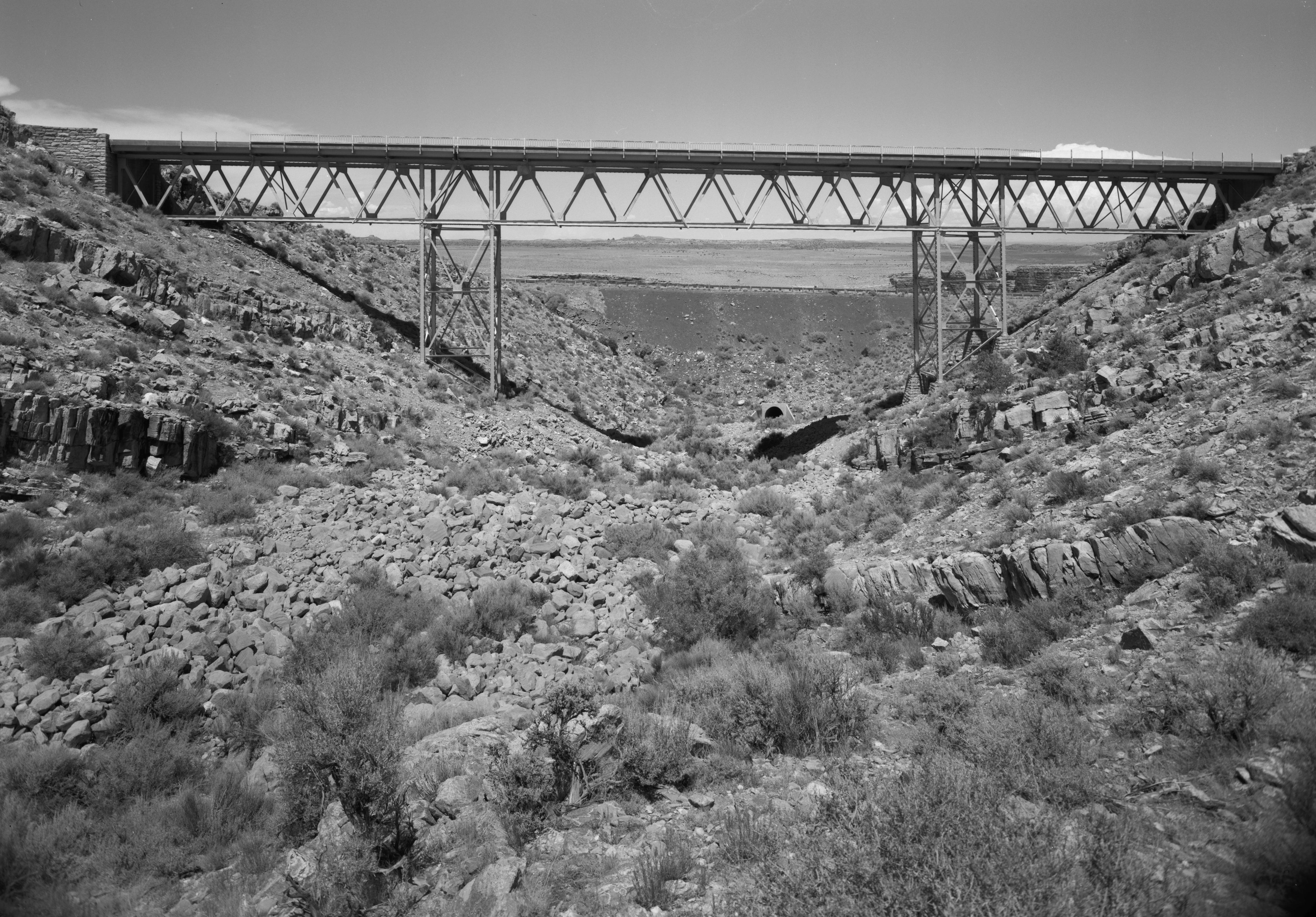

- Location within Arizona Location within the United States
- Nearest city: Desert View, Arizona
- Coordinates: 35.9327°N 111.6414°W
- Area: 0.2 acres (0.081 ha)
- Built: 1933
- Built by: Vinson & Pringle
- Architect: U.S. Bureau of Public Roads
- Architectural style: Warren deck truss
- MPS: Vehicular Bridges in Arizona MPS
- NRHP reference No.: 88001603
- Added to NRHP: September 30, 1988

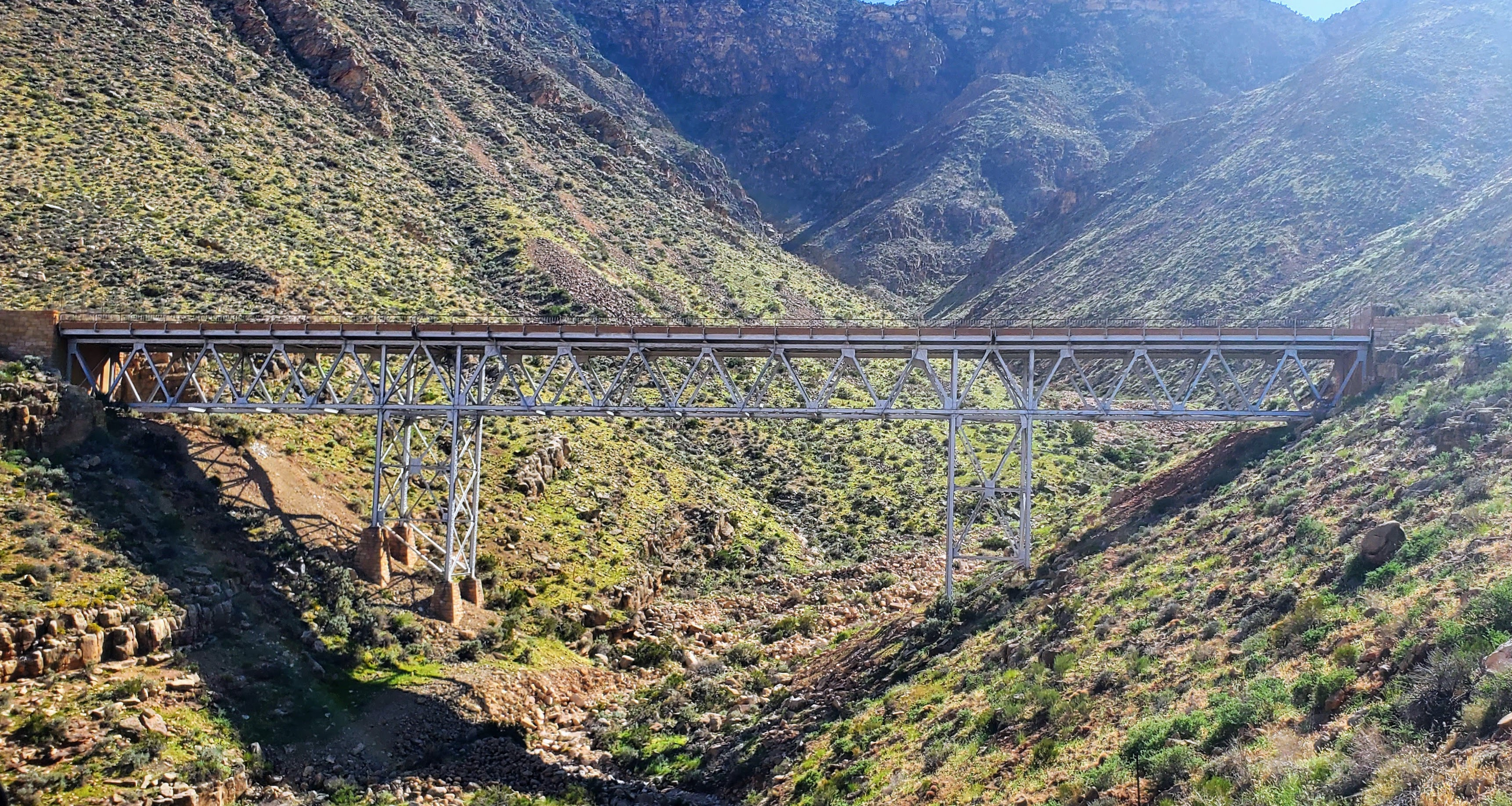
Dead Indian Canyon Bridge, 2022

The Dead Indian Canyon Bridge, near Desert View in Coconino County, Arizona, is a Warren truss bridge built in 1933 as part of developing public highway approach from the east to the south rim of the Grand Canyon. It was listed on the National Register of Historic Places in 1988.

It is located on an abandoned grade of State Route 64 (SR 64) over Dead Indian Canyon, 150 yards (140 m) south (upstream) from the current SR 64 roadway. It is 301.83 feet (92.00 m) in length.

It was designed by the U.S. Bureau of Public Roads and was built by contractors Vinson & Pringle of Phoenix.

According to HAER documentation, "Dead Indian Canyon Bridge is significant for its association with the Cameron Approach Road, constructed in 1931–35 as the first modern automotive road linking the south rim of Grand Canyon National Park to the eastern Navajo Reservation and regional highways in northeastern Arizona. The bridge is also illustrative of roads and road structures built within special federal legislative authority to connect western national parks through a park-to-park highway system."

It was also deemed significant as the last-built and the longest of Arizona's deck truss bridges.

It is located 13.2 miles (21.2 km) east of Desert View, on SR 64, which, although designated a state highway, was managed by the federal-level National Park Service.

== See also ==
- List of bridges documented by the Historic American Engineering Record in Arizona
- List of bridges on the National Register of Historic Places in Arizona
