= Corduroy Creek Bridge =

Former historic bridge in Navajo County, Arizona

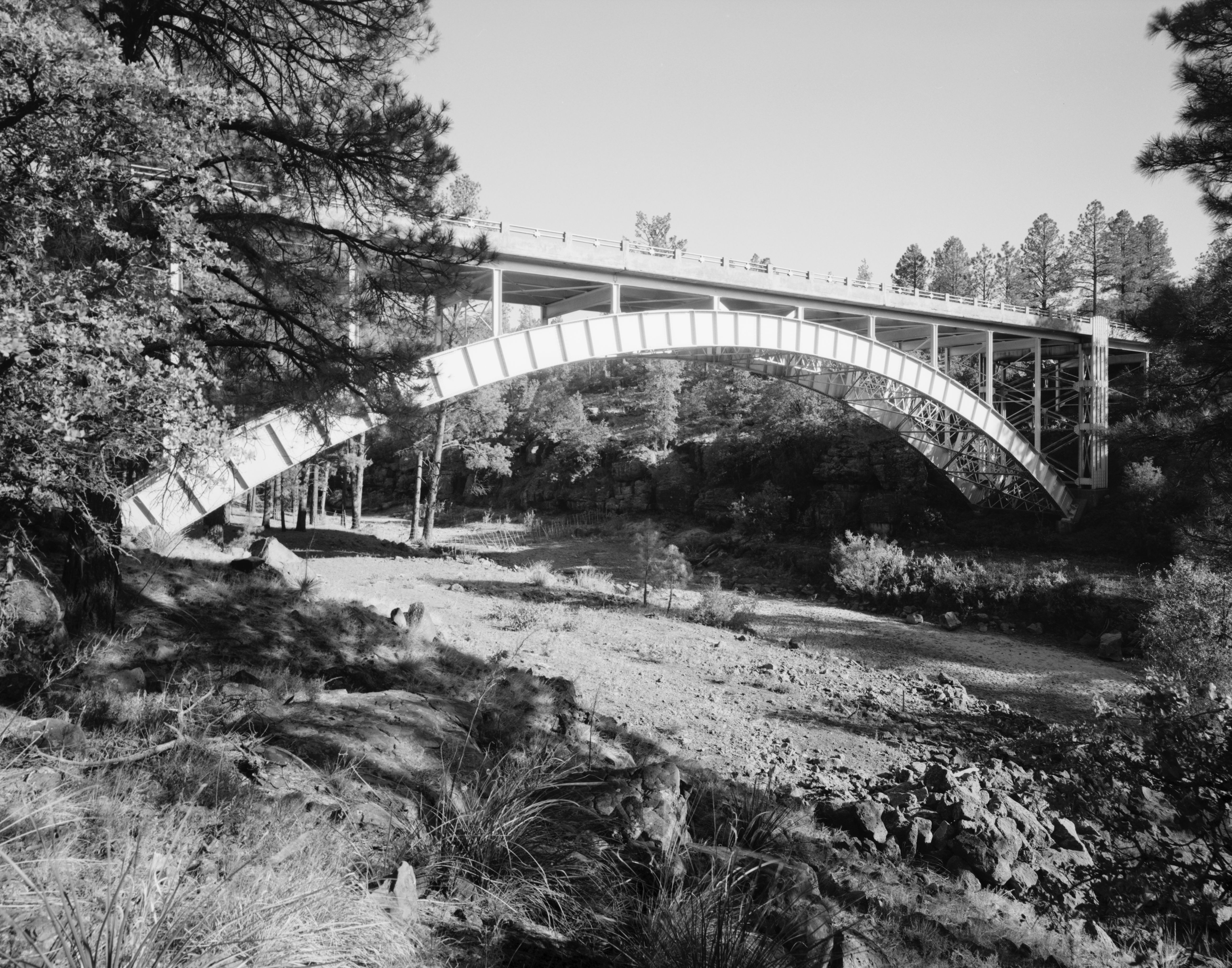
- Coordinates: 34°6′25″N 110°9′13″W
- Carries: US 60
- Crosses: Corduroy Creek
- Locale: Near Show Low, Arizona

Characteristics
- Design: Deck arch
- Material: Steel
- Total length: 250 feet (76 m)
- Width: 24 feet (7.3 m)
- Longest span: 180 feet (55 m)

History
- Architect: Pleasant-Hasler Construction Co.
- Construction start: 1937
- Construction end: 1938
- Closed: 1994
- Corduroy Creek Bridge
- U.S. National Register of Historic Places
- Location within Arizona Location within the United States
- MPS: Vehicular Bridges in Arizona MPS
- NRHP reference No.: 88001613
- Added to NRHP: September 30, 1988

Location
- Interactive map of Corduroy Creek Bridge

The Corduroy Creek Bridge was a steel arch highway bridge on US 60, located near Show Low in Navajo County, Arizona.

== History ==
The 180-foot (55 m) span ribbed girder arch bridge was built in 1937–38 with a total length of 250 feet (76 m).

In 1994 the nearby Cedar Canyon Bridge was substantially widened and upgraded, using the identical arch from the Corduroy Creek bridge to double the width of the Cedar Canyon bridge while rehabilitating the deck structure.

The Corduroy Creek bridge was replaced with an I-beam girder bridge.

== See also ==
- List of bridges documented by the Historic American Engineering Record in Arizona
- List of bridges on the National Register of Historic Places in Arizona
- National Register of Historic Places listings in Navajo County, Arizona
