= Arizona State Route 98 =

State highway in Arizona, United States

State Route 98
- SR 98 highlighted in red

Route information
- Maintained by ADOT
- Length: 66.89 mi (107.65 km)
- Existed: 1974–present
- Tourist routes: Nat'tsis'aan Navajo Mountain Scenic Road

Major junctions
- West end: US 89 in Page
- East end: US 160 near Shonto

Location
- Country: United States
- State: Arizona

Highway system
- Arizona State Highway System; Interstate; US; State; Scenic Proposed; Former
← SR 97	→ SR 99

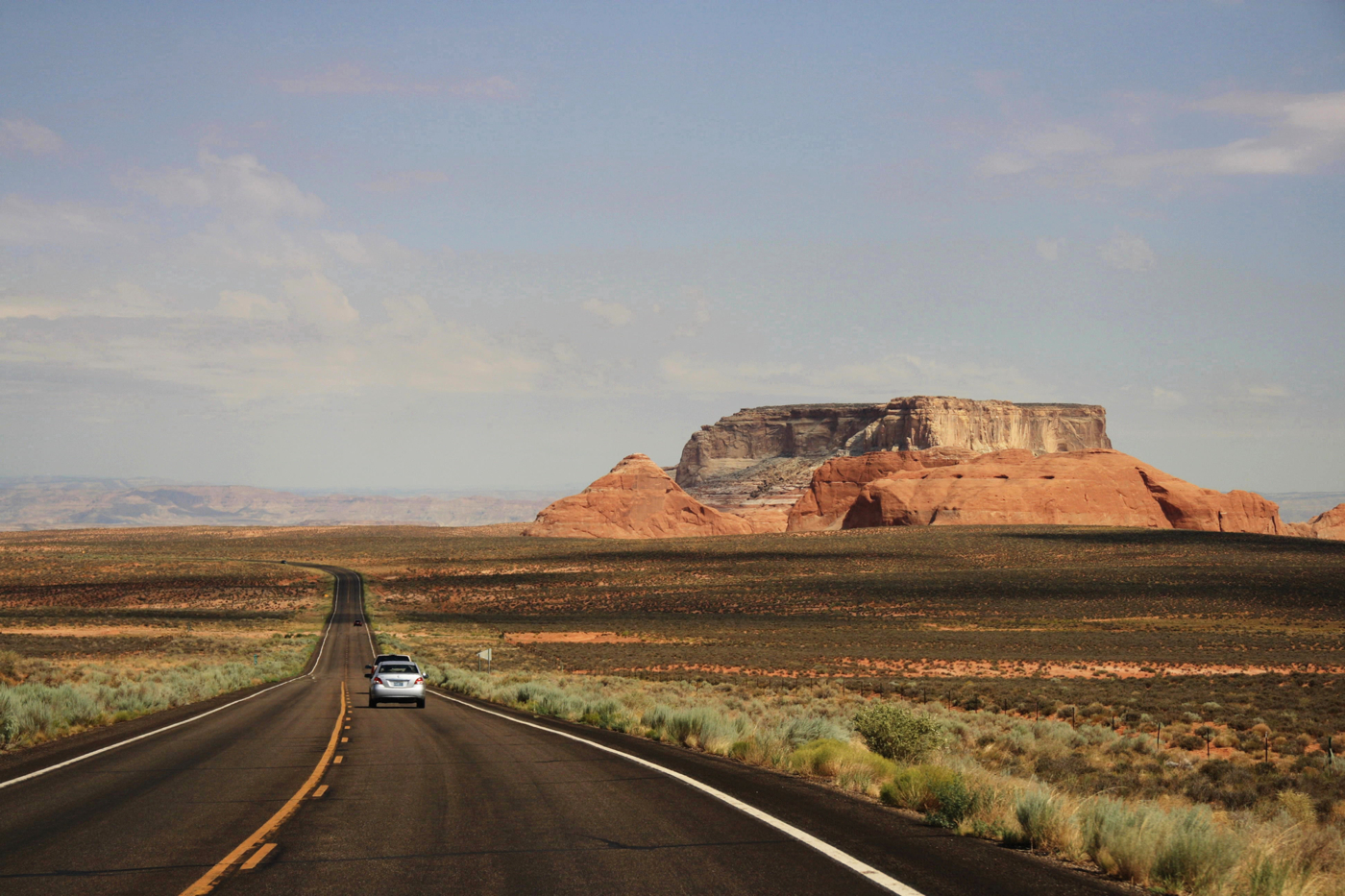
SR 98 east of Page, with LeChee Rock

State Route 98 (SR 98) is a state highway in Coconino County in the U.S. state of Arizona.

== Route description ==
SR 98 begins at an intersection with US 89 just south of the Glen Canyon Dam along the Colorado River. It runs along the southern portion of the city of Page and turns southeast to the Navajo Nation. It enters the town of Kaibito in the reservation, but otherwise the stretch through the Native American reservation is mostly devoid of settlements. Following Indian Route 22, SR 98 intersects Indian Route 221 just north of its eastern terminus at US 160, the Navajo Trail.

== History ==
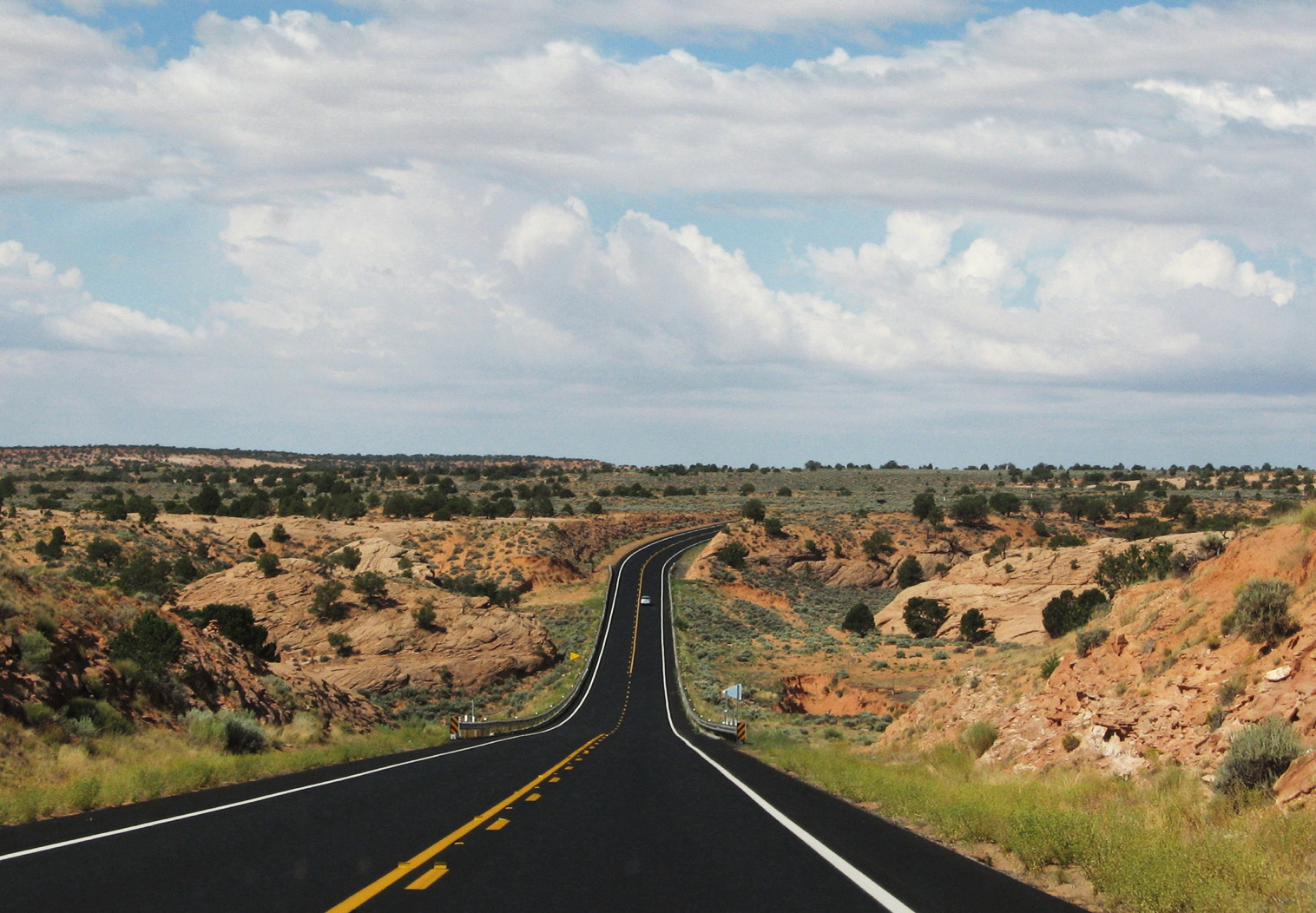
SR 98 east of Kaibito

The route was established in 1974, when portions of former Indian Route 22 were given to the Arizona Department of Transportation to establish as a state highway, as routed today. Portions of the route were realigned in Page when portions of the route were redefined as State Route 989. This portion in Page was later relinquished by ADOT to the city of Page. Four years later, the rest of the route was designated as a scenic road.

In 2013, due to the buckling of U.S. Route 89 south of Page, the route became one of the major detour routes from the South Rim to the North Rim of the Grand Canyon.

== Junction list ==
County	Location	mi	km	Destinations	Notes
Coconino	Page	0.00	0.00	US 89 – Flagstaff, Page	
Navajo	Shonto	66.85	107.58	US 160 – Kayenta, Tuba City	
1.000 mi = 1.609 km; 1.000 km = 0.621 mi
