= Cedar Canyon Bridge =

Bridge in Navajo County, Arizona

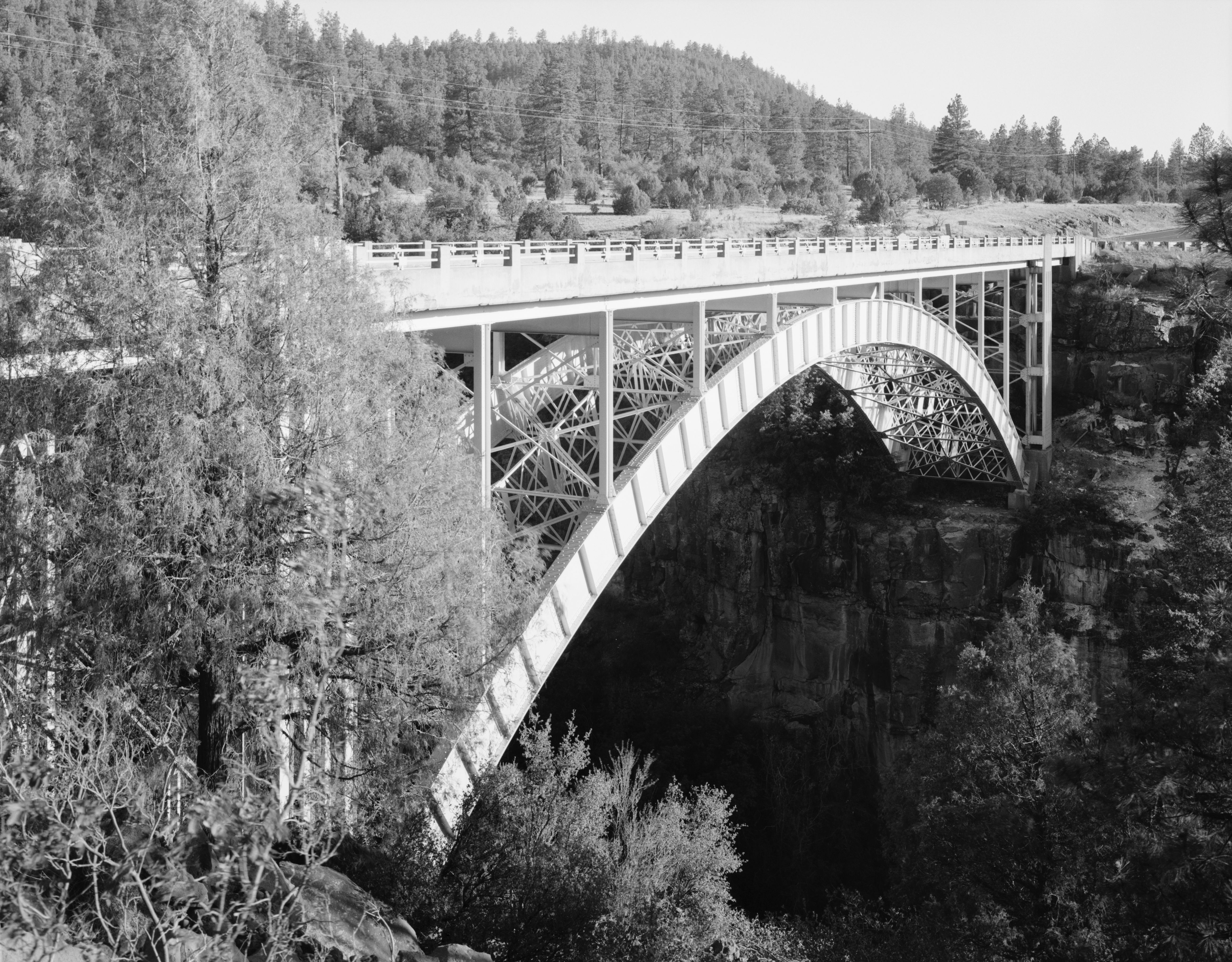
- Coordinates: 34°3′32″N 110°12′33″W
- Carries: US 60
- Crosses: Cedar Canyon
- Locale: near Show Low, Arizona

Characteristics
- Design: Deck arch
- Material: Steel
- Total length: 250 feet (76 m)
- Width: 24 feet (7.3 m)
- Longest span: 180 feet (55 m)

History
- Architect: Pleasant-Hasler Construction Co.
- Construction start: 1937
- Construction end: 1938
- Cedar Canyon Bridge
- U.S. National Register of Historic Places
- MPS: Vehicular Bridges in Arizona MPS
- NRHP reference No.: 88001612
- Added to NRHP: September 30, 1988

Location
- Interactive map of Cedar Canyon Bridge

The Cedar Canyon Bridge is a steel arch highway bridge on US 60 near Show Low, Arizona. The 180-foot (55 m) span ribbed girder arch bridge was built in 1937–38 with a total length of 250 feet (76 m). The 24-foot-wide (7.3 m) bridge was substantially widened and upgraded in 1994, using the identical arch from the Corduroy Creek Bridge to double the width of the bridge while rehabilitating the deck structure.

== See also ==
- List of bridges documented by the Historic American Engineering Record in Arizona
- List of bridges on the National Register of Historic Places in Arizona
- National Register of Historic Places listings in Navajo County, Arizona
