= Cameron Suspension Bridge =

Historic bridge in Arizona, United States

- The historic Cameron Suspension Bridge alongside US‑89, 2015
- Coordinates: 35°52′37.62″N 111°24′42.58″W
- Carries: Natural gas pipeline
- Crosses: Little Colorado River
- Locale: Cameron, Arizona; United States

Characteristics
- Design: Suspension
- Material: Steel
- Total length: 680 feet (210 m)
- Height: 14 feet (4.3 m)
- Longest span: 660 feet (200 m)

History
- Architect: W. H. Code
- Designer: W. H. Code
- Constructed by: Office of Indian Affairs; Midland Steel Co.
- Opened: 1911
- Closed: 1959
- Cameron Suspension Bridge
- U.S. National Register of Historic Places
- Area: 0.2 acres (0.081 ha)
- MPS: Vehicular Bridges in Arizona MPS
- NRHP reference No.: 86001206
- Added to NRHP: June 5, 1986

Location
- Interactive map of Cameron Suspension Bridge

The Cameron Suspension Bridge crosses the Little Colorado River at Cameron, Arizona, United States.

== Description ==
The bridge formerly carried U.S. Route 89, but was replaced by a newer deck truss bridge in 1959. Built in 1911, it has an overall length of 680 feet (210 m) and a main span of 660 feet (200 m). The bridge was built by the Midland Bridge Company of Kansas City for the Office of Indian Affairs and the Indian Irrigation Service. W. H. Code of the Midland Bridge Company was the designer. The suspension design was chosen to address the steep-walled canyon at the crossing, which required a single span with no temporary falsework. When built, the Cameron bridge was the longest suspension span west of the Mississippi River.

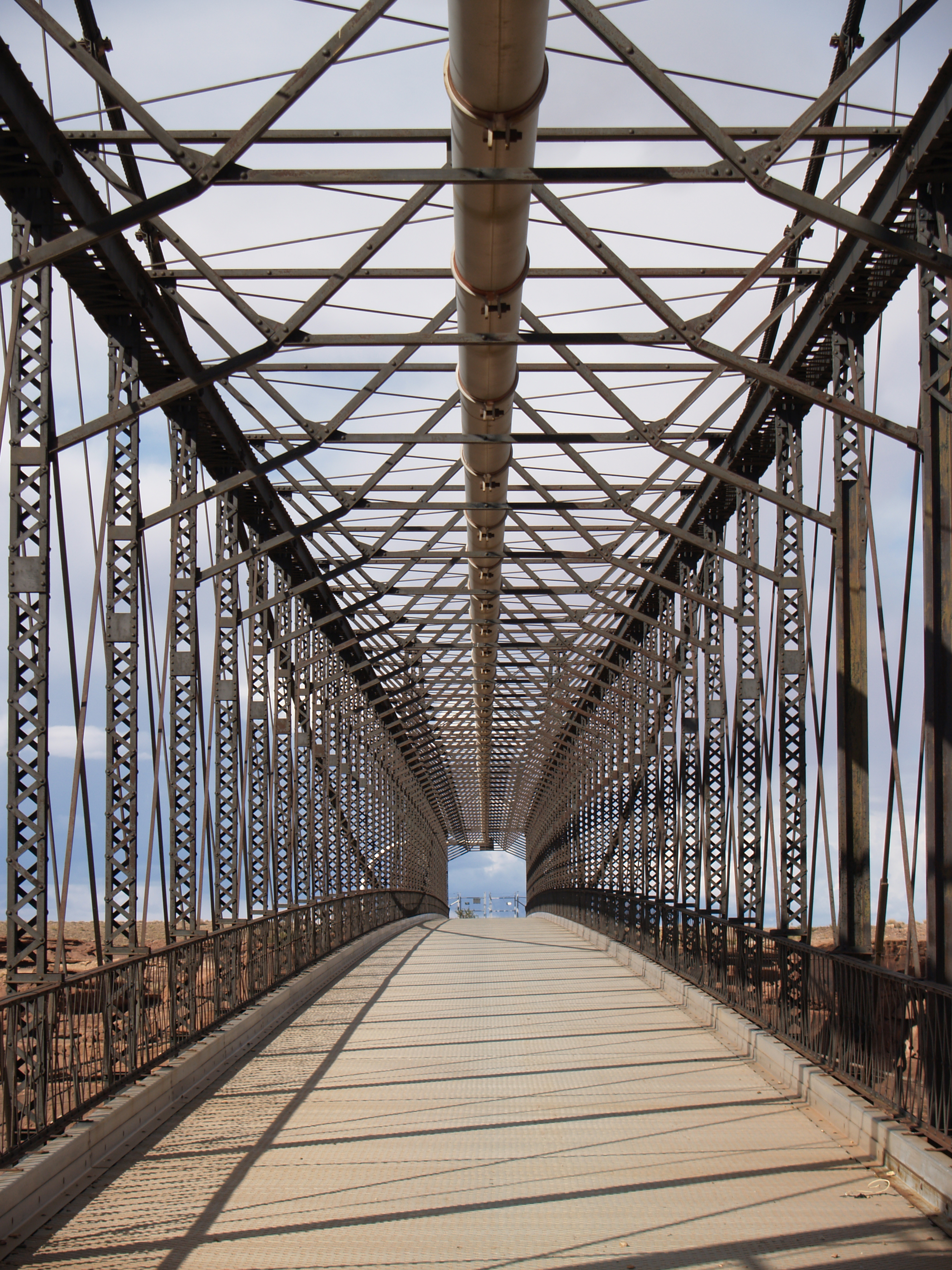
Looking through the Cameron Suspension Bridge, October 2006

The bridge towers rest on the rim of the canyon, with concrete deadmen anchoring the suspension cables some way back from the towers. The deck is stiffened by a Pratt through-truss, with a 14-foot (4.3 m) wide roadway. The bridge was built to improve access to the Navajo Nation and the Hopi Indian Reservation. Named for U.S. Senator Ralph H. Cameron, it was an important link for the construction of the Navajo Bridge on US 89 across the Colorado River in 1929. The town of Cameron grew up around the crossing, which in addition to opening up the Native American lands to the north, also provided a northern gateway to the South Rim of the Grand Canyon when the Navajo Bridge opened.

The bridge was damaged by an overload of sheep in 1937, when it almost collapsed. The damage was repaired and the bridge served highway traffic until 1959. It was sold to the Four Corners Pipeline Company when the new bridge opened, and carries a natural gas pipeline. The Four Corners Pipeline was eventually acquired by Questar Pipeline and is now a part of the Southern Trails Pipeline.

The Cameron Suspension Bridge is the oldest suspension bridge in Arizona, and one of only two of that type in the state.

The Cameron Suspension bridge was added to the National Register of Historic Places on June 5, 1986.

== See also ==
- Dewey Bridge (Utah), a bridge in Utah built using scaled blueprints of the Cameron Bridge
- List of bridges documented by the Historic American Engineering Record in Arizona
- List of bridges on the National Register of Historic Places in Arizona
- National Register of Historic Places listings in Coconino County, Arizona
