= Painted Desert Project =

Privately funded public art initiative for the Navajo Nation

The Painted Desert Project is a privately funded public art initiative which connects artists with communities through mural opportunities on the Navajo Nation. The Painted Desert Project is the brainchild of Chip Thomas, a doctor, photographer, activist and long-time reservation resident.

The Painted Desert Project began in 2012 when Chip Thomas invited several world-renowned street artists to the Navajo Nation for short-term residencies, during which the artists immersed themselves in the local communities. By requiring the artists to embed themselves within the local communities and engage in extensive research, it is hoped the artists will produce work that has relevance to the communities in which the art will remain after the artists depart. This embedded short-term residency approach is intended to obviate the possibility of cultural imperialism, a charge often leveled at large street art festivals. The art, primarily murals and enlarged photographs, grace water tanks, buildings, and roadside stands adjacent to the interstate highways which lace through northwestern Arizona. The installation of art pieces has encouraged the revival of previously abandoned buildings and roadside stands, thereby energizing the community and elevating economic prospects on the Navajo Nation. More importantly, a dialog has begun between residents of the reservation about the work as well as between tourists passing through the area and local residents. In a small way, the art brings people together and stimulates conversations that might not otherwise occur.

Artists who have been involved with the Painted Desert Project include: Tom Greyeyes, Troy Lovegates (Canada), Thomas "Breeze" Marcus, Monica Canilao, Overunder, Doodles, Labrona (Canada), Gaia, Roa, JB Snyder, Pixel Pancho, 2501, Ever, Jaz, Alexis Diaz, Hyuro, Mazatl, Stinkfish, LNY, Nanook, Jess X. Chen + Mata Ruda.

The Painted Desert Project is ongoing as of 2019. Thomas hosts a Google map of sites of the Painted Desert Project on his personal blog.
