= Cedar Canyon, San Ysidro Mountains =

Valley in San Diego County, California

Coordinates: 32°38′00″N 116°49′47″W

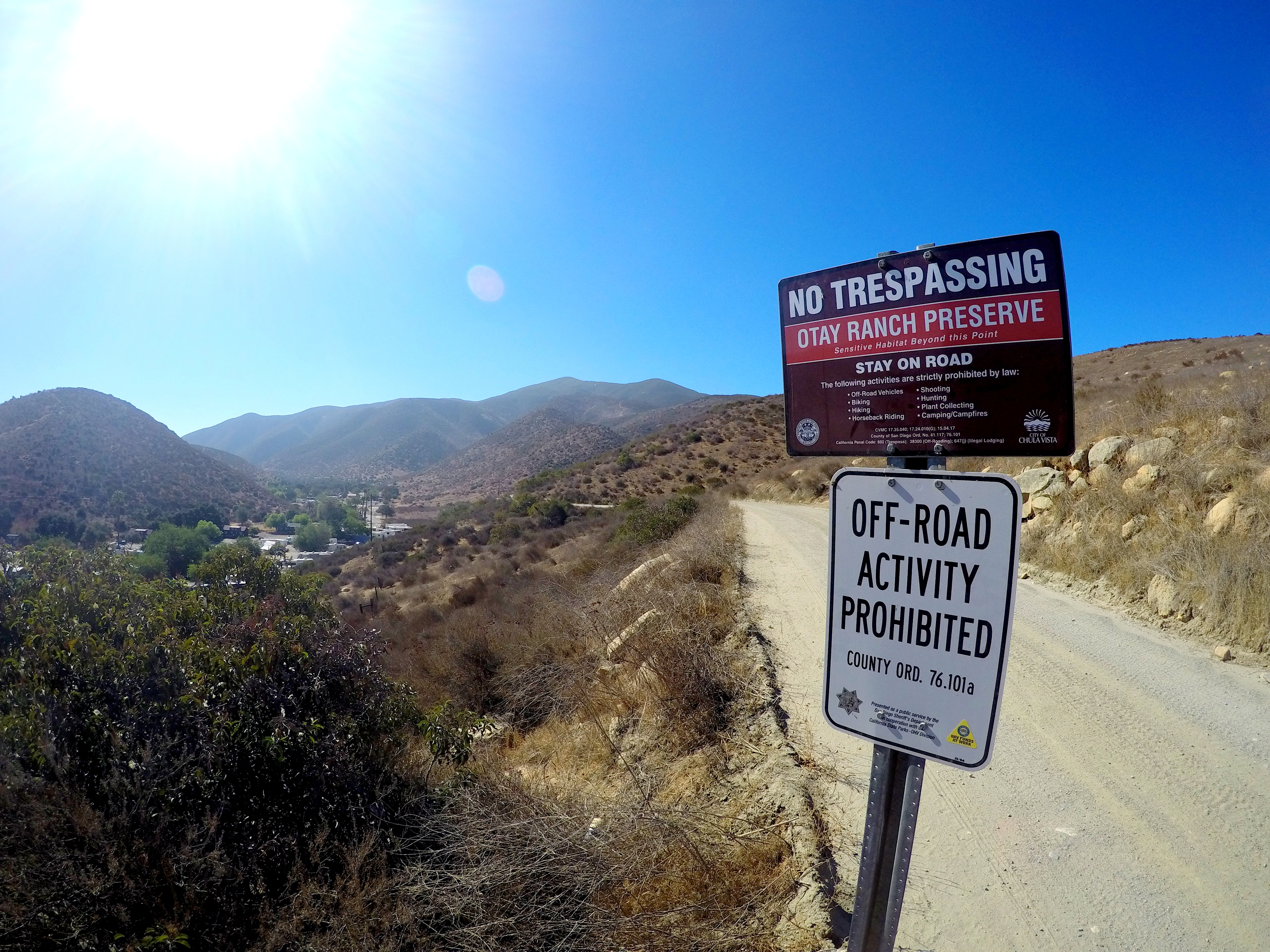
Cedar Canyon to the left, Minnewawa Truck Trail to the right

Cedar Canyon is a valley of the San Ysidro Mountains in San Diego County, California, extending from the northern slopes of Otay Mountain in the south to Otay Lakes Road in the north. Part of it is in the Otay Mountain Wilderness.
