= Tsegi, Arizona =

- Populated place
- Location within the state of Arizona Tsegi (the United States)
- Coordinates: 36°38′58″N 110°25′45″W
- Country: United States
- State: Arizona
- County: Navajo
- Elevation: 6,237 ft (1,901 m)
- Time zone: UTC-7 (Mountain (MST))
  - Summer (DST): UTC-7 (MST)
- Area code: 928
- FIPS code: 04-75870
- GNIS feature ID: 24662

Tsegi is a populated place situated in Navajo County, Arizona, United States.
