= Echo Cliffs =

Land formation in Coconino County, Arizona

Coordinates: 36.607°N 111.644°W

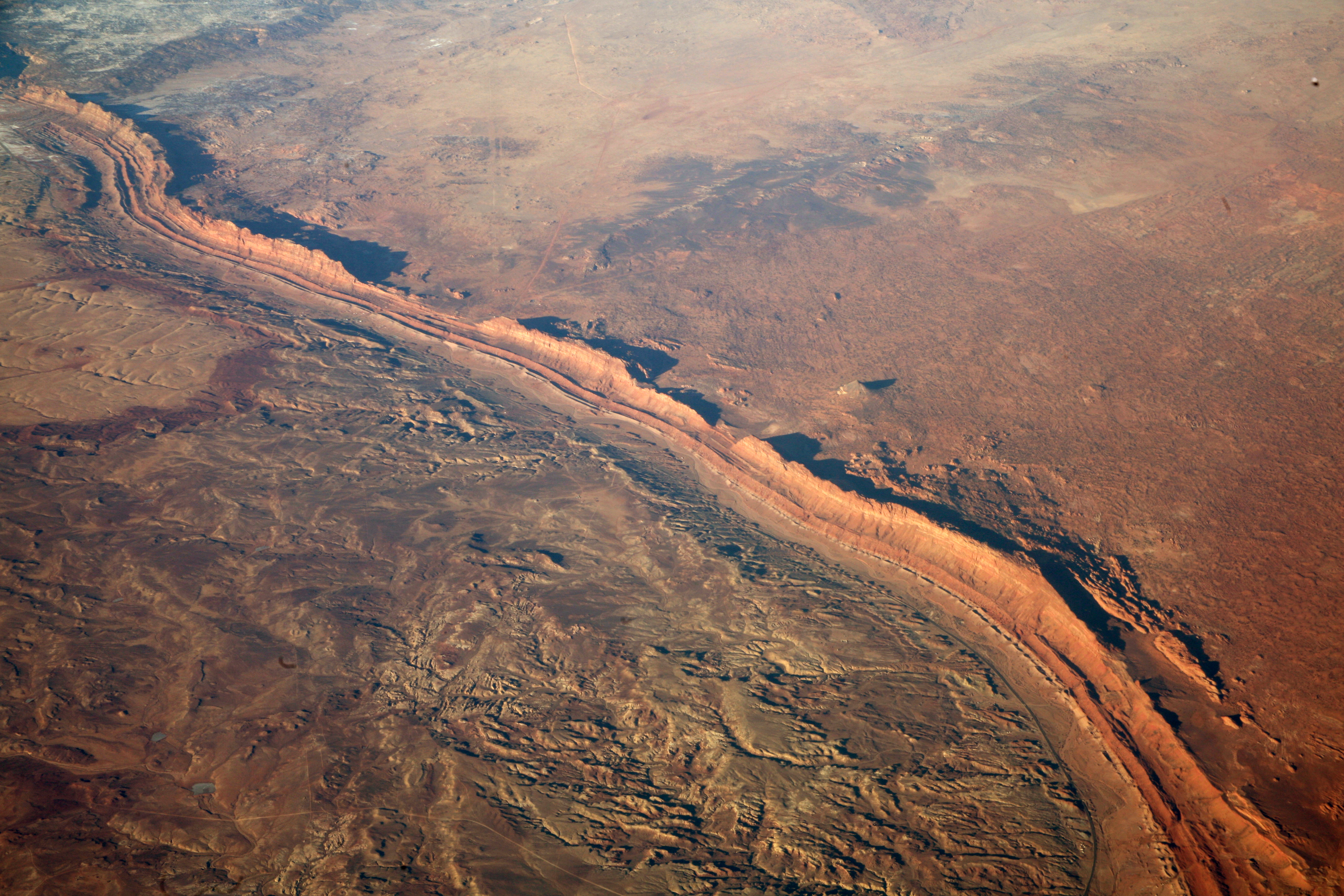
Aerial view of the Echo Cliffs.

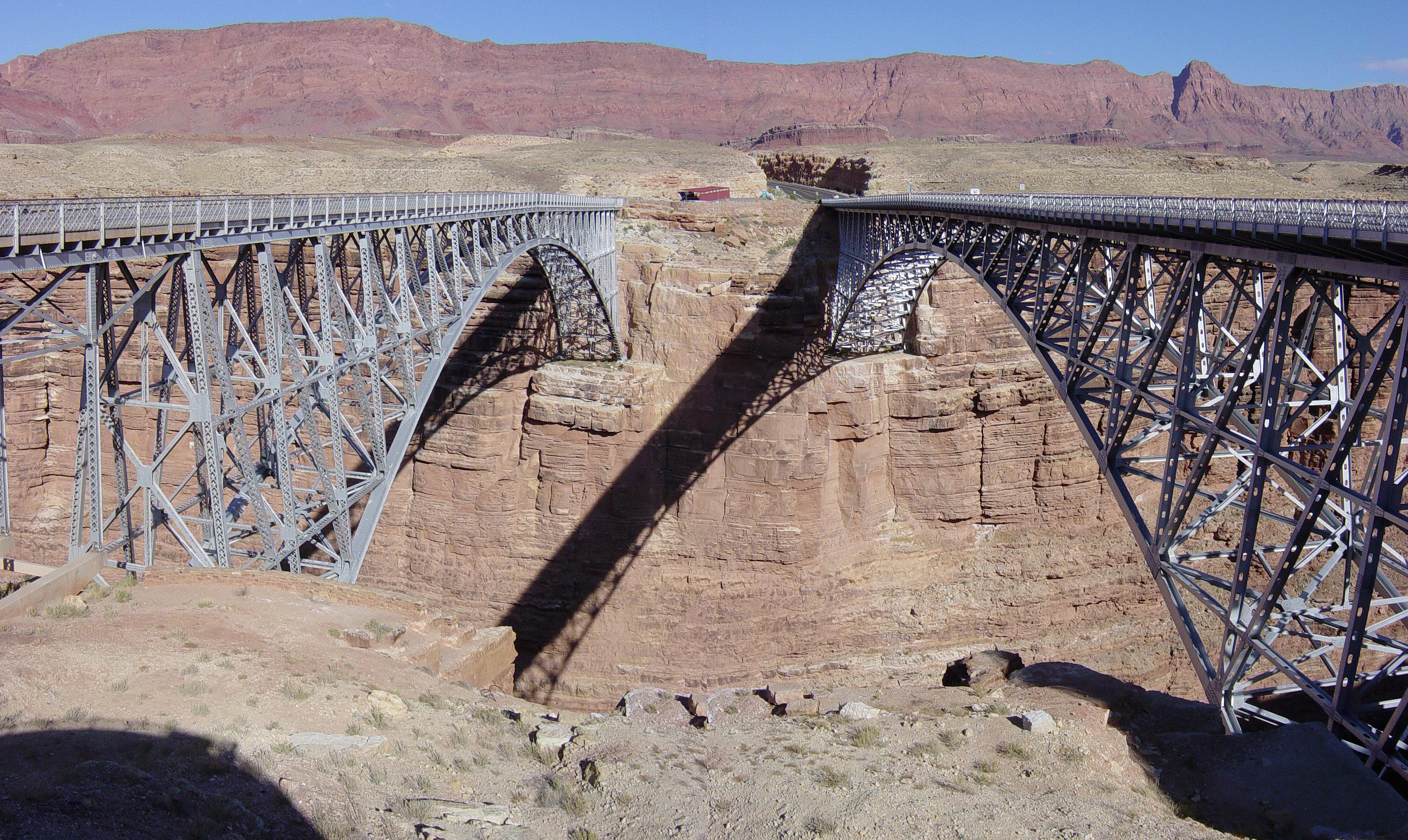
Echo Cliffs from the Navajo Bridge.

The Echo Cliffs are a prominent geological feature in northern Arizona. The cliffs stretch for 70 miles (110 km) and reach over 1000 feet (300 m) high. They are found in Coconino County on the Navajo Nation about 20 miles (32 km) east of Grand Canyon National Park.

U.S. Highway 89 runs parallel to the cliffs for 60 miles (97 km).

The Tutuveni petroglyphs are found at a site at the base of the cliffs.

== Geology ==
The cliffs form the western escarpment of a mesa called the Kaibito Plateau and follow the axis of the Echo Monocline. Rocks of the Wingate sandstone, Navajo Sandstone, Kayenta Formation, all part of the Glen Canyon Group, crop out along the cliffs' length. The Chinle Formation underlies the Glen Canyon Group in the Echo Cliffs area.

Comparatively little talus is found at the base of the cliffs. Its rocks tend to break up forming sediments which are quickly removed by wind and stream action.

== See also ==
- Navajo Bridge
- Paria Canyon
- Vermilion Cliffs
