= Cameron, Arizona =

Census-designated place in Coconino County, Arizona, United States

- CDP
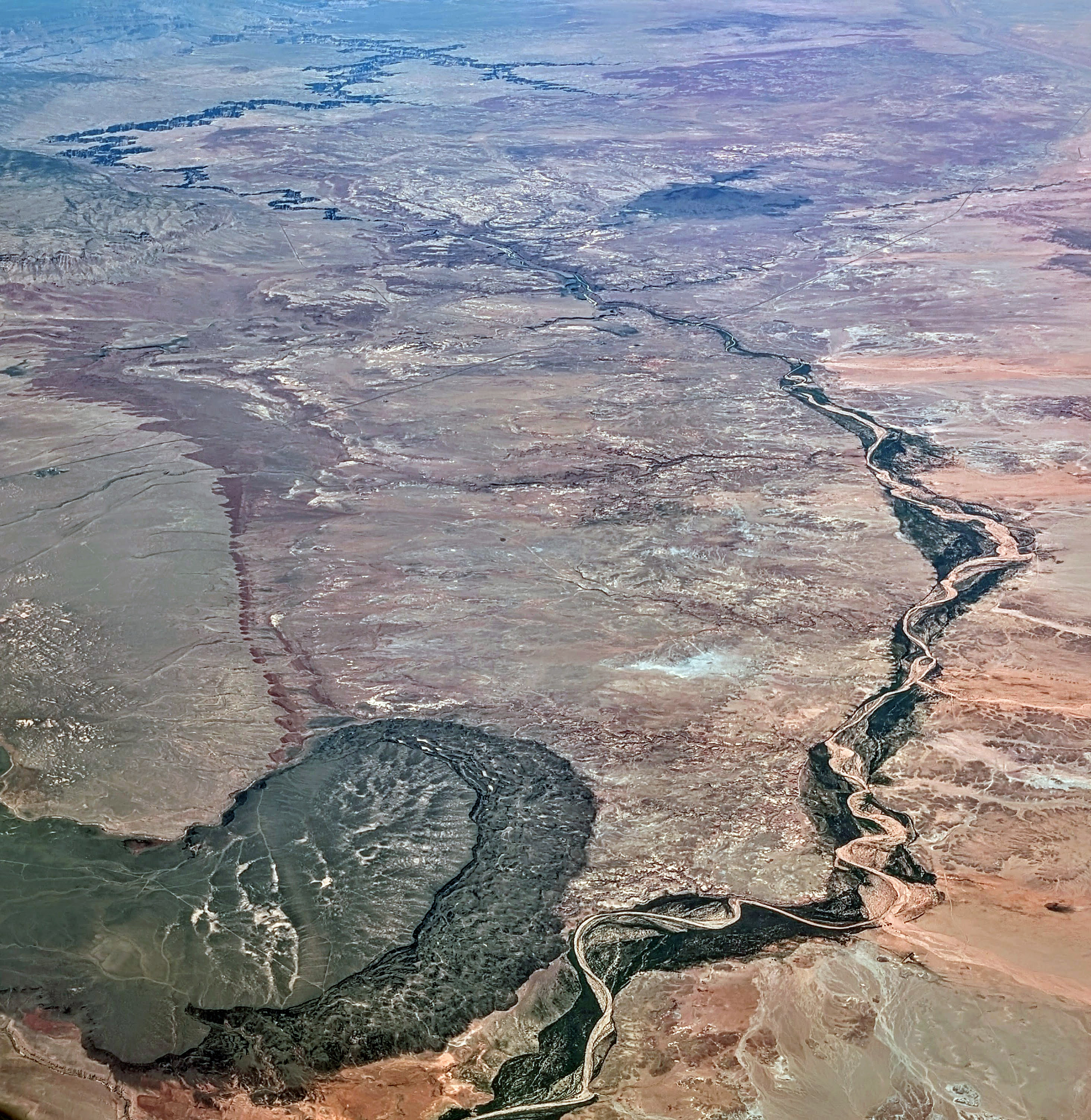
- Aerial view around Cameron, where US Route 89 crosses the Little Colorado River

- Location in the United States Cameron, Arizona (the United States)
- Coordinates: 35°52′20″N 111°25′28″W
- Country: United States
- State: Arizona
- County: Coconino

Area
  - Total: 18.74 sq mi (48.54 km^{2})
  - Land: 18.73 sq mi (48.50 km^{2})
  - Water: 0.015 sq mi (0.04 km^{2})
- Elevation: 4,206 ft (1,282 m)

Population (2020)
  - Total: 734
  - Density: 39.2/sq mi (15.14/km^{2})
- Time zone: UTC-7 (MST)
  - Summer (DST): UTC-6 (MDT)
- ZIP codes: 86016, 86020
- Area code: 928
- FIPS code: 04-09340
- GNIS feature ID: 2407943

Cameron is a census-designated place (CDP) in Coconino County, Arizona, United States, on the Navajo Nation. The population was 734 at the 2020 census, down from 885 at the 2010 census. Most of the town's economy is tourist food and craft stalls, restaurants, and other services for north–south traffic from Flagstaff and Page. There is a ranger station supplying information and hiking permits for the Navajo Nation. There is also a large craft store run by the Nation itself. It is named after Ralph H. Cameron, one of the two senators first appointed (Henry F. Ashurst being the other) to U.S. Congress for Arizona, upon its federal recognition of statehood.

== Geography ==
Cameron is located on the Navajo Nation. Elevation is 4,216 feet (1,285 m) above sea level. It is immediately south of the Little Colorado River, just above the beginning of the Little Colorado River Gorge and the stream's descent into the Grand Canyon. Cameron lies at the intersection of US 89 and State Route 64, not far from the Desert View entrance to Grand Canyon National Park.

According to the United States Census Bureau, the CDP has a total area of 18.7 square miles (48.5 km^{2}), of which 0.02 square miles (0.04 km^{2}) is water.

== Demographics ==
Languages (2000)	Percent
Spoke Navajo at home	70%
Spoke English at home	30%

Historical population
Census	Pop.	Note	%±
1960	20		—
2000	978		—
2010	885		−9.5%
2020	734		−17.1%
U.S. Decennial Census

Cameron's population was 63 in 1940, and was 20 in the 1960 census.

As of the census of 2000, there were 978 people, 236 households, and 194 families residing in the CDP. The population density was 53.0 inhabitants per square mile (20.5/km^{2}). There were 317 housing units at an average density of 17.2 per square mile (6.6/km^{2}). The racial makeup of the CDP was 94.7% Native American, 1.7% White, 0.1% Black or African American, 0.1% Asian, 0.8% from other races, and 2.6% from two or more races. 4.1% of the population were Hispanic or Latino of any race.

There were 236 households, out of which 44.5% had children under the age of 18 living with them, 47.9% were married couples living together, 28.4% had a female householder with no husband present, and 17.4% were non-families. 15.7% of all households were made up of individuals, and 4.2% had someone living alone who was 65 years of age or older. The average household size was 4.14 and the average family size was 4.61.

In the CDP, the age distribution of the population shows 41.2% under the age of 18, 10.9% from 18 to 24, 27.5% from 25 to 44, 13.7% from 45 to 64, and 6.6% who were 65 years of age or older. The median age was 24 years. For every 100 females, there were 105.0 males. For every 100 females age 18 and over, there were 91.7 males.

The median income for a household in the CDP was $24,773, and the median income for a family was $21,420. Males had a median income of $21,786 versus $12,614 for females. The per capita income for the CDP was $5,970. About 38.0% of families and 36.5% of the population were below the poverty line, including 42.0% of those under age 18 and 52.8% of those age 65 or over.

== Arts and culture ==
Cameron Suspension Bridge is a suspension bridge built in 1911, by the Midland Bridge Co. for the Office of Indian Affairs. The one track suspension bridge was erected over a gorge of the Little Colorado River. The bridge, which was bypassed 1959, was named after Seth Tanner, a Mormon prospector from Tuba City, Arizona. It was listed in the National Register of Historic Places on in 1986.

== Education ==
The area is served by the Tuba City Unified School District. The community has one elementary school called Dzil Libei Elementary School, which is a K–6 grade school serving the community. There is also a local preschool run by the Navajo Nation.

Tuba City High School and Tuba City Elementary School serve Cameron.

== Infrastructure ==
Express provides connecting bus service to Page.

== See also ==
- List of census-designated places in Arizona
