= List of bridges on the National Register of Historic Places in Arizona =

This is a list of bridges and tunnels on the National Register of Historic Places in the U.S. state of Arizona.

| Name | Image | Built | Listed | Location | County | Type |
|---|---|---|---|---|---|---|
| Alchesay Canyon Bridge | Alchesay Canyon Bridge | 1904, 1905 | 1988-09-30 | Roosevelt; 33°40′5″N 111°9′30″W | Maricopa | Filled spandrel arch |
| Allentown Bridge | Allentown Bridge | 1923 | 1988-09-30 | Houck; 35°16′51″N 109°9′16″W | Apache | Pratt deck truss |
| Antelope Hill Highway Bridge | | 1915, 1920 | 1979-06-28 | Tacna; 32°43′8″N 114°0′43″W | Yuma | Concrete girder |
| Black Gap Bridge | Black Gap Bridge | 1921 | 1988-09-30 | Clifton; 32°56′47″N 109°19′7″W | Greenlee | Concrete slab |
| Black River Bridge | | 1912, 1929 | 1988-09-30 | Near Carrizo; 33.71299°N 110.21179°W | Gila | Warren deck truss |
| Boulder Creek Bridge | 1937 Boulder Creek Bridge | 1937 | 1989-03-31 | Tortilla Flat; 33°32′1″N 111°25′23″W | Maricopa | |
| Broadway Bridge | Broadway Bridge | 1917 | 1988-09-30 | Clarkdale; 34°46′27″N 112°3′19″W | Yavapai | Skewed concrete slab |
| Cameron Suspension Bridge | Cameron Suspension Bridge | 1911 | 1986-06-05 | Cameron; 35°52′38″N 111°24′40″W | Coconino | Suspension-truss hybrid |
| Canyon Diablo Bridge | Canyon Diablo Bridge | 1914, 1915, ca. 1930 | 1988-09-30 | Winona; 35°6′56″N 111°5′41″W | Coconino | Concrete Luten arch |
| Canyon Padre Bridge | Canyon Padre Bridge | 1913, 1914 | 1988-09-30 | Flagstaff; 35°9′44″N 111°17′12″W | Coconino | Concrete Luten arch |
| Cedar Canyon Bridge | | 1937 | 1988-09-30 | Show Low; 34°3′32″N 110°12′33″W | Navajo | Arch |
| Chevelon Creek Bridge | Chevelon Creek Bridge | 1912, 1913 | 1983-12-08 | Winslow; 34°55′24″N 110°31′43″W | Navajo | Pony truss |
| Ciénega Bridge | | 1920–1921 | 1988-09-30 | Vail; 32°1′11″N 110°38′43″W | Pima | Open spandrel concrete arch |
| Cordova Avenue Bridge | Cordova Ave. Bridge | 1921 | 1989-03-31 | Miami; 33°23′44″N 110°52′32″W | Gila | Luten arch |
| Corduroy Creek Bridge | | 1937 | 1988-09-30 | Show Low; 34°6′24″N 110°9′10″W | Navajo | Arch |
| Dead Indian Canyon Bridge | | 1933, 1934 | 1988-09-30 | Desert View; 35°55′58″N 111°38′27″W | Coconino | Warren deck truss |
| Devil's Canyon Bridge | | 1921, 1922 | 1988-09-30 | Superior; 33°19′39″N 111°1′54″W | Pinal | Filled spandrel arch |
| Douglas Underpass | | 1936 | 1988-09-30 | Douglas; 31°21′1″N 109°33′17″W | Cochise | Concrete slab |
| Fish Creek Bridge | | 1923 | 1988-09-30 | Tortilla Flat; 33°32′14″N 111°17′46″W | Maricopa | Pony truss |
| Fossil Creek Bridge | | 1924, 1925 | 1988-09-30 | Camp Verde; 34°23′39″N 111°37′45″W | Gila, Yavapai | Filled spandrel arch |
| Fourth Avenue Underpass | Fourth Avenue Underpass | 1916 | 1988-09-30 | Tucson; 32°13′22″N 110°57′54″W | Pima | Concrete girder |
| Gila Bend Overpass | Gila Bend Overpass | 1934 | 1988-09-30 | Gila Bend; 32°56′58″N 112°41′46″W | Maricopa | Skewed steel deck girder |
| Gila River Bridge | Gila River Bridge | 1918 | 1988-09-30 | Clifton; 32°57′54″N 109°18′31″W | Greenlee | Luten arch |
| Gillespie Dam Highway Bridge | Gillespie Dam Highway Bridge | 1926, 1927 | 1981-05-05 | Gila Bend; 33°13′38″N 112°46′7″W | Maricopa | Camelback through truss |
| Hassayampa River Bridge | Hassayampa River Bridge | 1929 | 1988-09-30 | Buckeye, Arizona; 33°20′54″N 112°43′17″W | Maricopa | The bridge, described as a, Concrete slab and girder, was modified and repaired in 1993. |
| Hell Canyon Bridge | | 1923 | 1988-09-30 | Drake; 34°58′45″N 112°22′54″W | Yavapai | Concrete slab and girder |
| Hereford Bridge | Hereford Bridge | 1912, 1927 | 1988-09-30 | Hereford; 31°26′18″N 110°06′27″W | Cochise | Pony truss |
| Holbrook Bridge | | 1916 | 1988-09-30 | Holbrook; 34°53′6″N 110°6′35″W | Navajo | Luten arch |
| Holbrook Bridge | | 1928 | 1989-03-31 | Holbrook; 34°53′52″N 110°9′43″W | Navajo | Warren pony truss |
| Inspiration Avenue Bridge | Inspiration Avenue Bridge | 1921 | 1989-03-31 | Miami; 33°23′46″N 110°52′29″W | Gila | Luten arch |
| Jack's Canyon Bridge | | 1913 | 1988-09-30 | Winslow; 34°58′32″N 110°39′12″W | Navajo | Concrete slab |
| Kelvin Bridge | | 1917 | 1988-09-30 | Kelvin; 33°6′10″N 110°58′26″W | Pinal | Concrete Luten arch |
| Keystone Avenue Bridge | Keystone Avenue Bridge | 1921 | 1989-03-31 | Miami; 33°23′48″N 110°52′27″W | Gila | Luten arch |
| Lewis and Pranty Creek Bridge | | 1923 | 1988-09-30 | Tortilla Flat; 33°31′30″N 111°18′24″W | Maricopa | Warren pony truss |
| Lithodendron Wash Bridge | | 1932 | 1988-09-30 | Holbrook; 34°59′30″N 109°56′59″W | Navajo | Timber stringer |
| Little Hell Canyon Bridge | | 1923 | 1988-09-30 | Drake; 35°4′48″N 112°24′22″W | Yavapai | Warren deck truss |
| Little Lithodendron Wash Bridge | | 1932 | 1988-09-30 | Holbrook; 34°59′27″N 109°54′27″W | Navajo | Timber stringer |
| Lynx Creek Bridge | | 1922 | 1988-09-30 | Prescott; 34°33′8″N 112°22′21″W | Yavapai | Filled spandrel arch |
| McPhaul Suspension Bridge | McPhaul Suspension Bridge | 1929 | 1981-08-13 | Dome; 32°45′34″N 114°25′17″W | Yuma | Warren pony truss |
| Miami Avenue Bridge | Miami Avenue Bridge | 1921 | 1989-03-31 | Miami; 33°23′17″N 110°52′25″W | Gila | Luten arch |
| W. W. Midgley Bridge | | 1938, 1939 | 1989-03-31 | Sedona; 34°53′07″N 111°44′33″W | Coconino | Spandrel-braced deck arch |
| Mill Avenue Bridge | 1931 Tempe Bridge | 1931 | 1981-08-13 | Tempe; 33°25′49″N 111°56′22″W | Maricopa | Multiple arch |
| Mineral Creek Bridge | | ca. 1923 | 1988-09-30 | Kelvin; 33°7′20″N 110°58′32″W | Pinal | Concrete Luten arch |
| Mormon Flat Bridge | 1924 Mormon Flat Bridge | 1924, 1925 | 1988-09-30 | Tortilla Flat; 33°32′20″N 111°26′34″W | Maricopa | Camelback through truss |
| Navajo Bridge | | 1927-1929 | 1981-08-13 | Lee's Ferry; 36°49′05″N 111°37′52″W | Coconino | Spandrel-braced deck arch |
| Ocean to Ocean Bridge | Ocean to Ocean Bridge | 1914, 1915 | 1979-09-11 | Yuma; 32°43′42″N 114°36′53″W | Yuma | Through truss |
| Old Trails Bridge | Old Trails Bridge | 1915, 1916 | 1988-09-30 | Topock; 34°42′57″N 114°29′5″W | Mohave | Brace-ribbed through arch |
| Park Avenue Bridge | Park Avenue Bridge | 1918 | 1988-09-30 | Clifton; 33°3′22″N 109°17′55″W | Greenlee | Through truss |
| Perkinsville Bridge | Perkinsville Bridge | 1921, 1936 | 1989-03-31 | Ash Fork; 34°53′43″N 112°12′18″W | Yavapai | Pratt through truss |
| Petrified Forest Bridge | | 1932 | removed 1998-11-27 | Navajo | Apache | Girder and stringer |
| Pine Creek Bridge | | 1925 | 1988-09-30 | Tortilla Flat; 33°35′54″N 111°12′8″W | Maricopa | Filled spandrel arch |
| Poland Tunnel | | 1904 | 1978-03-29 | Poland; 34°26′15″N 112°22′02″W | Yavapai | |
| Pumphouse Wash Bridge | Queen Creek Bridge | 1931 | 1988-09-30 | Flagstaff; 35°1′30″N 111°44′6″W | Coconino | Steel stringer |
| Queen Creek Bridge | Queen Creek Bridge | 1919, 1920 | 1988-09-30 | Florence Junction; 33°17′16″N 111°19′42″W | Pinal | Concrete Luten arch |
| Queen Creek Bridge | Queen Creek Bridge | 1920, 1921 | 1988-09-30 | Superior; 33°17′47″N 111°5′19″W | Pinal | Open spandrel deck arch |
| Querino Canyon Bridge | Querino Canyon Bridge | 1930 | 1988-09-30 | Houck; 35°16′49″N 109°15′28″W | Apache | Warren deck truss |
| Reppy Avenue Bridge | Reppy Avenue Bridge | 1921 | 1988-09-30 | Miami; 33°23′42″N 110°52′34″W | Gila | Luten arch |
| Sacaton Dam Bridge | | 1924, 1925 | 1988-09-30 | Sacaton; 33°5′19″N 111°41′11″W | Pinal | Concrete slab and girder |
| Salt River Bridge | Salt River Bridge | 1920 | 1988-09-30 | Roosevelt; 33°37′9″N 110°55′15″W | Gila | Through truss |
| Salt River Canyon Bridge | Salt River Canyon Bridge | 1934 | 1988-09-30 | Carrizo; 33°47′19″N 110°30′50″W | Gila | Arch |
| San Tan Canal Bridge | | 1925, 1926 | 1988-09-30 | Sacaton; 33°5′30″N 111°41′11″W | Pinal | Skewed concrete girder |
| Sand Hollow Wash Bridge | | 1929, 1930 | 1988-09-30 | Littlefield; 36°49′40″N 113°59′59″W | Mohave | Warren deck truss |
| Sanders Bridge | | 1923 | 1988-09-30 | Sanders; 35°12′46″N 109°19′47″W | Apache | Pratt pony truss |
| Santa Cruz Bridge No. 1 | | 1917 | 1988-09-30 | Nogales; 31°23′19″N 110°52′25″W | Santa Cruz | Concrete girder |
| Sixth Avenue Underpass | | 1930 | 1988-09-30 | Tucson; 32°13′30″N 110°58′5″W | Pima | Concrete slab |
| Solomonville Road Overpass | Solomonville Road Overpass (Safford, Arizona) | 1907 | 1988-09-30 | Clifton; 32°58′29.2″N 109°18′02.8″W | Greenlee | Filled spandrel arch |
| Solomonville Road Overpass | Solomonville Road Overpass (Safford, Arizona) | 1907 | 1988-09-30 | Safford; 32°59′41″N 109°17′17″W | Greenlee | Filled spandrel arch |
| St. Joseph Bridge | St. Joseph Bridge | 1917 | 1988-09-30 | Joseph City; 34°56′28″N 110°19′23″W | Navajo | Pony truss |
| Stone Avenue Underpass | Stone Avenue underpass | 1936 | 1988-09-30 | Tucson; 32°13′37″N 110°58′16″W | Pima | Concrete slab |
| Tempe Bridge | | 1911–1913 | removed 1992-10-02 | Tempe | Maricopa | Open spandrel deck arch |
| Ash Avenue Bridge | Tempe Concrete Arch Bridge | 1911 | 1984-05-07 | Tempe; 33°25′52″N 111°56′30″W | Maricopa | |
| Verde River Bridge | | 1922, 1923 | 1988-09-30 | Paulden; 34°51′50″N 112°27′34″W | Yavapai | Filled spandrel arch |
| Verde River Sheep Bridge | Verde River Sheep Bridge | 1940, 1944 | 1978-11-21 | Carefree; 34°4′39″N 111°42′26″W | Yavapai | Suspension |
| Walnut Canyon Bridge | Walnut Canyon Bridge | 1923, 1924 | 1988-09-30 | Winona; 35°12′42″N 111°25′14″W | Coconino | Parker through truss |
| Walnut Creek Bridge | | 1921, 1936 | 1989-03-31 | Simmons; 34°55′44″N 112°48′55″W | Yavapai | Pratt through truss |
| Walnut Grove Bridge | | 1924 | 1988-09-30 | Walnut Grove; 34°18′37″N 112°34′5″W | Yavapai | Through and pony truss |
| Winkelman Bridge | Winkelman Bridge | 1916 | 1988-09-30 | Winkelman; 32°59′6″N 110°46′18″W | Pinal | Concrete Luten arch |
| Winslow Bridge | The Winslow Bridge | 1939 | 1989-03-31 | Winslow; 35°0′24″N 110°39′18″W | Navajo | Girder and stringer |
| Winslow Underpass | The Winslow Underpass | 1936 | 1988-09-30 | Winslow; 35°1′17″N 110°39′17″W | Navajo | Concrete slab |
| Woodruff Bridge | | 1917 | 1988-09-30 | Woodruff; 34°44′22″N 110°2′12″W | Navajo | Warren through truss |

== See also ==
- List of bridges in Arizona
