= National Register of Historic Places listings in Navajo County, Arizona =

Location of Navajo County in Arizona

This is a list of the National Register of Historic Places listings in Navajo County, Arizona. It is intended to be a complete list of the properties and districts on the National Register of Historic Places in Navajo County, Arizona, United States. The locations of National Register properties and districts for which the latitude and longitude coordinates are included below, may be seen in a map.

There are 57 properties and districts listed on the National Register in the county, including 3 that are also National Historic Landmarks.

This National Park Service list is complete through NPS recent listings posted May 22, 2026.

== Current listings ==
	Name on the Register	Image	Date listed	Location	City or town	Description
1	Agate House Pueblo	Agate House Pueblo	October 6, 1975 (#75000170)	Petrified Forest National Park; 34°48′18″N 109°51′40″W	Holbrook	
2	Arizona Rancho	Arizona Rancho	October 17, 1997 (#97001210)	Junction of Tovar and Apache Sts. 34°53′58″N 110°09′39″W	Holbrook	
3	Awatovi Ruins	Awatovi Ruins	October 15, 1966 (#66000187)	West of Jeddito; 35°43′07″N 110°16′37″W	Keams Canyon	
4	Bacavi (Paaqavi) Historic District		December 6, 1996 (#96001363)	Address Restricted	Bacavi	
5	Bailey Ruin		March 17, 2006 (#05001560)	Address Restricted	Pinedale	
6	Baird's Chevelon Steps	Baird's Chevelon Steps	January 23, 2003 (#02001724)	Address Restricted	Winslow	
7	Brigham City	Brigham City	June 9, 1978 (#78000558)	North of Winslow; 35°02′30″N 110°39′02″W	Winslow	
8	Norman Brimhall House		March 10, 2004 (#04000137)	210 S. Main St. 34°27′41″N 110°05′27″W	Taylor	
9	Cedar Canyon Bridge	Cedar Canyon Bridge	September 30, 1988 (#88001612)	U.S. Route 60 over Cedar Canyon at milepost 323.4; 34°03′32″N 110°12′33″W	Show Low vicinity	
10	Chevelon Creek Bridge	Chevelon Creek Bridge	December 8, 1983 (#83003454)	Chevelon Creek, southeast of Winslow; 34°55′24″N 110°31′43″W	Winslow	
11	Chevelon Ruin		March 1, 1984 (#84000778)	Address Restricted	Winslow	
12	Corduroy Creek Bridge	Corduroy Creek Bridge	September 30, 1988 (#88001613)	U.S. Route 60 over Corduroy Creek at milepost 328.3; 34°06′24″N 110°09′10″W	Show Low vicinity	
13	Deer Springs Lookout Complex		January 28, 1988 (#87002454)	Apache-Sitgreaves National Forest; 34°18′23″N 110°25′13″W	Mogollon Rim	
14	Abner Ellsworth House	Abner Ellsworth House	April 25, 1997 (#97000368)	260 N. 8th St. 34°15′09″N 110°02′03″W	Show Low	
15	James M. Flake House	James M. Flake House	July 14, 1971 (#71000113)	Stinson and Hunt Sts. 34°30′42″N 110°04′39″W	Snowflake	Streets renamed to E 2nd N St and 1st St E
16	Fort Apache Historic District	Fort Apache Historic District	October 14, 1976 (#76000377)	South of Whiteriver off State Route 73 on the Fort Apache Indian Reservation; 33°47′25″N 109°59′16″W	Whiteriver	Designated as the Fort Apache and Theodore Roosevelt School National Historic Landmark District March 2, 2012
17	John A. Freeman House	John A. Freeman House	November 25, 1980 (#80000768)	Main and Freeman Sts. 34°30′39″N 110°04′45″W	Snowflake	Streets renamed to W 1st N St and Main St
18	Grasshopper Ruin		February 17, 1978 (#78000555)	Address Restricted	Cibecue	
19	Holbrook Bridge	Holbrook Bridge	September 30, 1988 (#88001686)	Abandoned grade of U.S. Route 70 over the Little Colorado River, 4.2 miles southeast of Holbrook; 34°53′06″N 110°06′35″W	Holbrook	A Luten arch bridge from 1916
20	Holbrook Bridge	Holbrook Bridge	March 31, 1989 (#88001685)	State Route 77 over the Little Colorado River; 34°53′52″N 110°09′43″W	Holbrook	A Warren pony truss bridge from 1928, now demolished
21	Homolovi Four (IV)	Homolovi Four (IV)	June 4, 1986 (#86001243)	Address Restricted	Winslow	
22	Homolovi I Ruin	Homolovi I Ruin	June 4, 1984 (#84000776)	Address Restricted	Winslow	
23	Homolovi II	Homolovi II	August 2, 1983 (#83002994)	Address Restricted	Winslow	
24	Homolovi III		March 1, 1984 (#84000756)	Address Restricted	Winslow	
25	Lorenzo Hubbell Trading Post and Warehouse	Lorenzo Hubbell Trading Post and Warehouse	November 21, 2002 (#02001383)	523 W. 2nd St. 35°01′30″N 110°42′12″W	Winslow	
26	John R. Hulet House	John R. Hulet House	March 25, 1980 (#80000769)	Hulet Ave. and Smith St. 34°30′35″N 110°04′58″W	Snowflake	Streets renamed to W Center St and N 2nd St W
27	Inscription Rock	Inscription Rock	April 6, 1978 (#78000557)	East of Keams Canyon off State Route 264; 35°48′44″N 110°10′06″W	Keams Canyon	
28	Jack's Canyon Bridge	Jack's Canyon Bridge	September 30, 1988 (#88001678)	Abandoned State Route 99 over Jack's Canyon southeast of Winslow; 34°58′32″N 110°39′11″W	Winslow	
29	La Posada Historic District	La Posada Historic District	March 31, 1992 (#92000256)	200 E. 2nd St. 35°01′18″N 110°41′41″W	Winslow	
30	Lithodendron Wash Bridge		September 30, 1988 (#88001687)	15.8 miles northeast of Holbrook on Interstate 40 Frontage Rd. 34°59′27″N 109°54′27″W	Holbrook	Eastern one of a pair of timber stringer bridges built in 1932, this one having 22 spans and deteriorated, not in use.
31	Little Lithodendron Wash Bridge		September 30, 1988 (#88001688)	13.2 miles northeast of Holbrook on Interstate 40 Frontage Rd. 34°59′30″N 109°56′59″W	Holbrook	Western one of a pair of timber stringer bridges built in 1932, this one having 18 spans and well-preserved under ADOT
32	Lower Cibecue Lutheran Mission		March 5, 2002 (#02000126)	Fort Apache Indian Reservation; 34°01′14″N 110°28′52″W	Cibecue	
33	Navajo County Courthouse	Navajo County Courthouse	July 31, 1978 (#78000556)	Courthouse Sq. 34°54′12″N 110°09′24″W	Holbrook	
34	Old Oraibi	Old Oraibi	October 15, 1966 (#66000188)	Hopi Indian Reservation; 35°52′37″N 110°38′17″W	Oraibi	
35	Painted Desert Petroglyphs and Ruins Archeological District	Painted Desert Petroglyphs and Ruins Archeological District	June 24, 1976 (#76000215)	Address Restricted	Holbrook	
36	A. Z. Palmer House		March 10, 2004 (#04000139)	26 E. Center; 34°27′55″N 110°05′21″W	Taylor	
37	Jordan Palmer House		March 10, 2004 (#04000136)	101 S. Main St. 34°27′48″N 110°05′25″W	Taylor	
38	Pinedale Elementary School		March 8, 2002 (#01001301)	300 S. Main St. 34°18′16″N 110°14′55″W	Pinedale	
39	Pinedale Ranger Station		June 10, 1993 (#93000510)	Forest Rd. 130 (formerly State Route 260) in the Apache-Sitgreaves National Forest; 34°18′17″N 110°14′47″W	Pinedale	
40	Quinn Cabin		January 26, 2026 (#100012635)	2262 Cedar Ave; 34°09′41″N 109°59′20″W	Lakeside vicinity	
41	St. Joseph Bridge	St. Joseph Bridge	September 30, 1988 (#88001633)	4.4 miles southeast of Joseph City on Joseph City-Holbrook Rd. 34°56′28″N 110°19′23″W	Joseph City	
42	Sidney Sapp House	Sidney Sapp House	March 13, 1986 (#86000362)	215 W. Hopi; 34°53′58″N 110°10′03″W	Holbrook	
43	Shumway School	Shumway School	January 29, 1979 (#79000420)	Off State Route 77; 34°24′23″N 110°04′21″W	Shumway	
44	Jesse N. Smith House	Jesse N. Smith House	July 14, 1971 (#71000114)	203 W. Smith Ave. 34°30′32″N 110°04′57″W	Snowflake	Streets renamed to W Center St and S 2nd W St
45	Snowflake Stake Academy Building	Snowflake Stake Academy Building	March 25, 1980 (#80000770)	Ballard and Hulet Aves. 34°30′26″N 110°04′58″W	Snowflake	Streets renamed to W 1st S St and S 2nd W St
46	Snowflake Townsite Historic District	Snowflake Townsite Historic District	March 26, 1998 (#98000261)	Roughly bounded by 3rd St. N., Stinson, 2nd St. S., and Hulet; 34°30′33″N 110°04′43″W	Snowflake	
47	South Central Avenue Commercial Historic District	South Central Avenue Commercial Historic District	February 14, 1997 (#97000041)	119 S. Central Ave. 34°53′59″N 110°09′26″W	Holbrook	The South Central Avenue Commercial Historic District consists of the following buildings: Bucket of Blood Saloon, the Robinson & Co. Drug Store, the Pioneer Saloon and the H. H. Scorse Mercantile. South Central Avenue is also known as "Bucket of Blood Street"
48	Aquilla Standifird House	Aquilla Standifird House	March 10, 2004 (#04000138)	306 S. Main St. 34°27′38″N 110°05′27″W	Taylor	
49	Standing Fall House		November 1, 1985 (#85003480)	Address Restricted	Black Mesa	
50	Stinson-Flake House	Stinson-Flake House	March 10, 1982 (#82001621)	Freeman Ave and Stinson St. 34°30′39″N 110°04′40″W	Snowflake	Streets renamed to E 1st N St and N 1st E St
51	Wigwam Village No. 6	Wigwam Village No. 6	May 2, 2002 (#02000419)	811 W. Hopi Dr. 34°54′08″N 110°10′06″W	Holbrook	
52	Winslow Bridge	Winslow Bridge	March 31, 1989 (#88001611)	State Route 87 over the Little Colorado River at milepost 344.9; 35°00′24″N 110°39′18″W	Winslow	
53	Winslow Commercial Historic District	Winslow Commercial Historic District	April 20, 1989 (#89000316)	Roughly bounded by 3rd, Williamson Ave., 1st, and Warren Ave. 35°01′24″N 110°41′50″W	Winslow	
54	Winslow Municipal Airport Historic District	Winslow Municipal Airport Historic District	September 21, 2022 (#100008194)	701,703,707 Airport Rd. 35°01′17″N 110°42′56″W	Winslow	
55	Winslow Residential Historic District	Winslow Residential Historic District	April 28, 1989 (#89000296)	Kinsley Ave. from Oak to Aspinwall; 35°01′35″N 110°41′44″W	Winslow	
56	Winslow Underpass	Winslow Underpass	September 30, 1988 (#88001610)	State Route 87 under the ATSF railroad line at milepost 342.1; 35°01′17″N 110°41′52″W	Winslow	
57	Woodruff Bridge		September 30, 1988 (#88001630)	4 miles south of Woodruff on Woodruff-Snowflake Rd. 34°44′22″N 110°02′12″W	Woodruff	

== See also ==
- List of National Historic Landmarks in Arizona
- National Register of Historic Places listings in Arizona
