= Pinedale Ranger Station =

- U.S. National Register of Historic Places
- Location within Arizona Location within the United States
- Nearest city: Pinedale, Navajo County, Arizona
- Coordinates: 34°18′16.654″N 110°14′47.245″W
- Area: 3 acres (1.2 ha)
- Built: 1934
- Architect: USDA Forest Service
- Architectural style: Bungalow/Craftsman
- MPS: Depression-Era USDA Forest Service Administrative Complexes in Arizona MPS
- NRHP reference No.: 93000510
- Added to NRHP: June 10, 1993

The Pinedale Ranger Station is in the Apache-Sitgreaves National Forests, and located near Pinedale in Navajo County, Arizona.

== History ==
The ranger station's buildings were built in 1934 by the CCC − Civilian Conservation Corps.

The administration of timber sales was one of the ranger's main duties; the lumber mill town of Standard is located about three miles to the south.

It was listed on the National Register of Historic Places for its architecture, which is American Craftsman and Bungalow style. It was designed by architects of the USDA Forest Service.

The NRHP listing included three contributing buildings which served as government housing and as office space, located on 3 acres (1.2 ha).

== See also ==
- National Register of Historic Places listings in Navajo County, Arizona
- CCC – Civilian Conservation Corps projects in Arizona
- Apache–Sitgreaves National Forest topics
