= Chevelon Creek Bridge =

Historic bridge in Arizona, U.S.

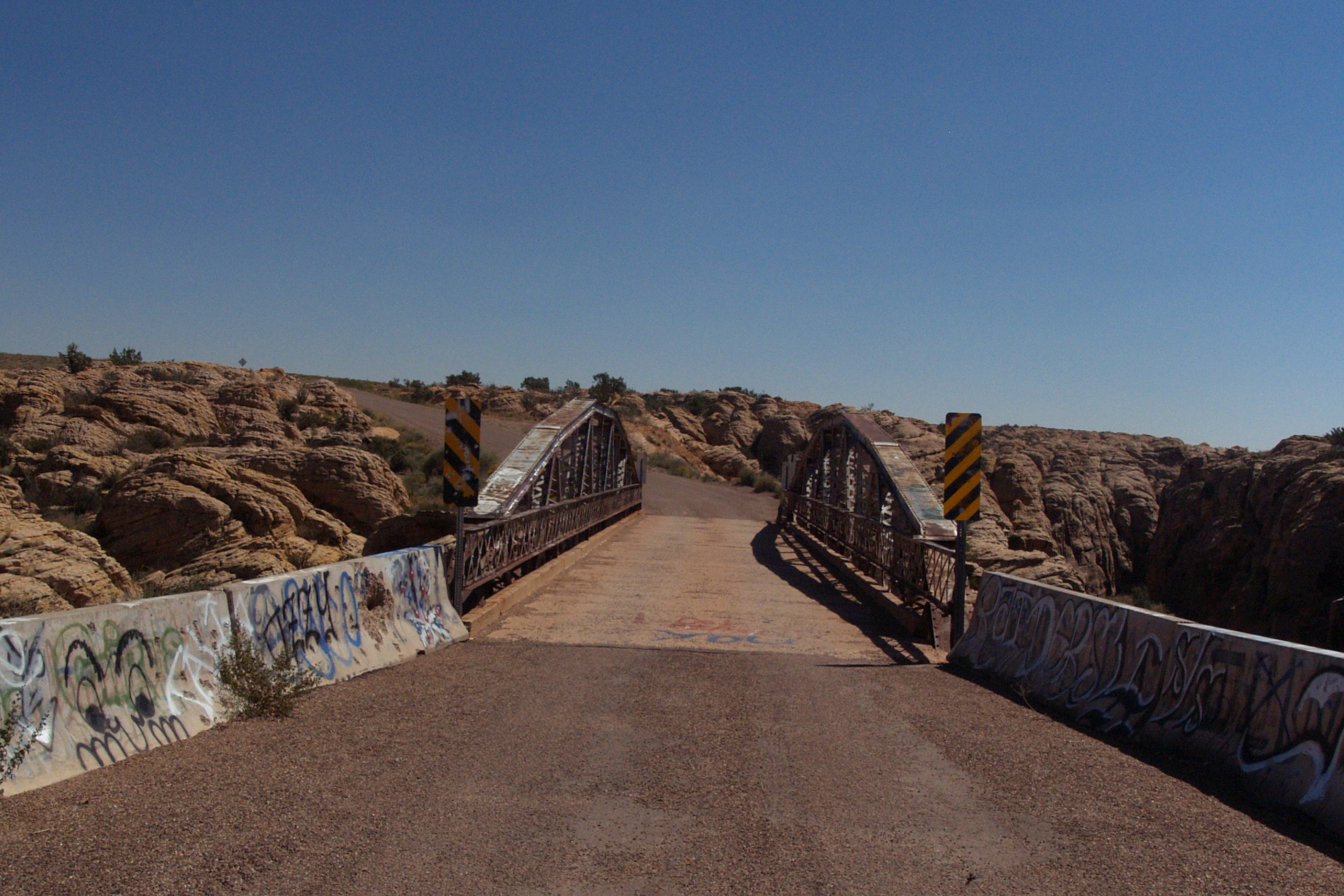
- Coordinates: 34°55′24″N 110°31′45″W
- Carries: Motor vehicles
- Crosses: Chevelon Creek
- Locale: Navajo County, Arizona, US
- Owner: Navajo County
- Heritage status: Arizona Historic Bridge Inventory
- ID number: AZ #8158

Characteristics
- Design: Polygonal Warren / Pony truss bridge
- Material: Steel and concrete
- Total length: 103 feet (31 m)
- Width: 16.2 feet (4.9 m)
- Longest span: 102 feet (31 m)
- No. of spans: 1

History
- Constructed by: Missouri Valley Bridge & Iron Co.
- Construction start: 1912
- Construction end: 1913
- Construction cost: $4,985
- Rebuilt: 2013–2014
- Chevelon Creek Bridge
- U.S. National Register of Historic Places
- Location within Arizona Location within the United States
- Nearest city: Southeast of Winslow
- Built: 1913
- Architectural style: Pony truss bridge
- MPS: Vehicular Bridges in Arizona MPS
- NRHP reference No.: 83003454
- Added to NRHP: December 8, 1983

Location
- Interactive map of Chevelon Creek Bridge

Chevelon Creek Bridge is a historic road bridge located about 12 miles (19 km) southeast of Winslow, in Navajo County, eastern Arizona, United States. It is a steel Warren Pony truss bridge over Chevelon Creek, built on the first permanent road connecting Holbrook, the seat of Navajo County, and Winslow. When built, the road was regionally important in northern Arizona as well as being a segment of an early national highway at the time automobile traffic was growing and national roads were first being formed. The bridge was listed on the National Register of Historic Places in 1983 for being a rare design in Arizona, part of an early transnational roadway, one of the first bridges built by Arizona after statehood in 1912, and being in nearly original condition.

== History ==
The bridge was one of the first road projects undertaken by Arizona after statehood in 1912, when the legislature directed that $5,500 from the state road fund be used to construct the bridge to carry the Santa Fe Highway across a rugged, 100-foot (30 m) deep canyon. The road, crossing northern Arizona from New Mexico to California, was a segment of national highway that replaced a transcontinental wagon route and eventually became U.S. Route 66. Cutting through Coconino Plateau that has an elevation 6,000 feet (1,800 m) east of Winslow, the canyon was considered at the time "a practically impassible topographic barrier".

The bridge replaced an earlier county-built "pin-connected" Pratt truss after Navajo County requested an inspection in 1911 by the state (then territory) engineer.

Although intended to be part of a state highway system, the state merely assisted counties in developing the system through funding. The bridge was built by Navajo County, which contracted, on October 2, 1912, with the Missouri Valley Bridge & Iron Co. of Leavenworth, Kansas. (Note: Other sources say the contract was with Arizona.) Missouri Valley poured seven cubic yards (5.4 m^{3}) of concrete for the abutments on top of solid rock in late 1912. The steel was shipped from Kansas on December 30. The truss design was approved in January 1913 and the bridge was 80% complete by June. The completed bridge was accepted in July, at a cost of $4,985. It was the first truss bridge built by Arizona and the first "designed, fabricated and erected by a nationally important bridge firm."

In addition to being part of a national route connecting California with New Mexico, the bridge was important regionally. Holbrook and Winslow, both stops on the Santa Fe Railroad traversing northern Arizona, were important commercial towns centered on agriculture and livestock. Good transportation was necessary to support commerce and government, as Holbrook was the county seat, as well as Arizona's nascent tourism industry.

The bridge was used on the route for several years until the alignment was moved further north, above the Little Colorado River sometime between 1914 and 1924, (Note: An older version of the HABS form says 1934.) after which the bridge was part of a Navajo County highway. The road over the bridge is McLaws Road.

The original concrete roadbed was replaced in 1931.

== Description ==
The bridge is a Warren/Pony truss bridge spanning abutments 102 feet (31 m) apart and is 90 feet (27 m) above the water level of the creek. The steel structure is entirely riveted. The driving surface of the deck is 13 feet 3 inches (4.04 m) wide and the bridge's overall width is 16 feet 2 inches (4.93 m).

== Heritage ==
The Chevelon Creek Bridge is listed on the National Register of Historic Places (NRHP), as part of the Vehicular Bridges in Arizona MPS submission in 1983.

The bridge was ranked high for historical significance (94 out of 100 possible points) in the Arizona Historic Bridge Inventory. The main factors leading to the high score were that it was part of a primary transcontinental route and was one of the first significant road structures undertaken by the newly formed state of Arizona. Also noted was that it was the first bridge built in Arizona by a prominent national company

The 1983 NRHP nomination noted the bridge had been well maintained and painted as necessary showing only some light rusting. The bridge carried a ten-ton weight rating and served an unpaved county road.

At the time of the bridge's construction, concrete arch bridges were being built in the state. Due to the remote location, and depth and steepness of the canyon, a concrete arch bridge would have been impractical and prohibitively expensive. Although small metal truss bridges were common across the country, there are few across Arizona and this is the only one in Navajo County. There is only one other pony truss bridge in the state that is either older or longer, the 102-foot (31 m) Hereford Bridge over the San Pedro River in Cochise County in southern Arizona, completed in 1912.

== Restoration ==
A plan to restore the bridge by Navajo County began before June 2002. The cost was estimated by the planners at $503,800 but when the project was bid during the construction boom of 2006, the lowest bid was over $1.2 million and the project was put on hold. In 2010, the bridge qualified for state and federal aid because the state inspected the bridge and rated it as "below 30% 'sufficiency'". Further delays occurred for various reasons for several more years until the project began in 2013 under an agreement that called for the county to pay 5.7% of the cost and the state the remaining 94.3%.

The bridge was closed in 2013, and reopened in 2014. The project including repairs to the concrete abutments, structural steel, and complete replacement of the road deck. The work included removing layers of paint containing lead. The abatement required building a temporary aluminum platform under the bridge and wrapping the entire structure in plastic to contain the particles of paint that were removed with an abrasive blasting process using crushed walnut shells.

== See also ==
- National Register of Historic Places listings in Navajo County, Arizona
- Road bridges on the National Register of Historic Places in Arizona
