= Arizona Rancho =

Historic hotel in Holbrook, Arizona

- U.S. National Register of Historic Places
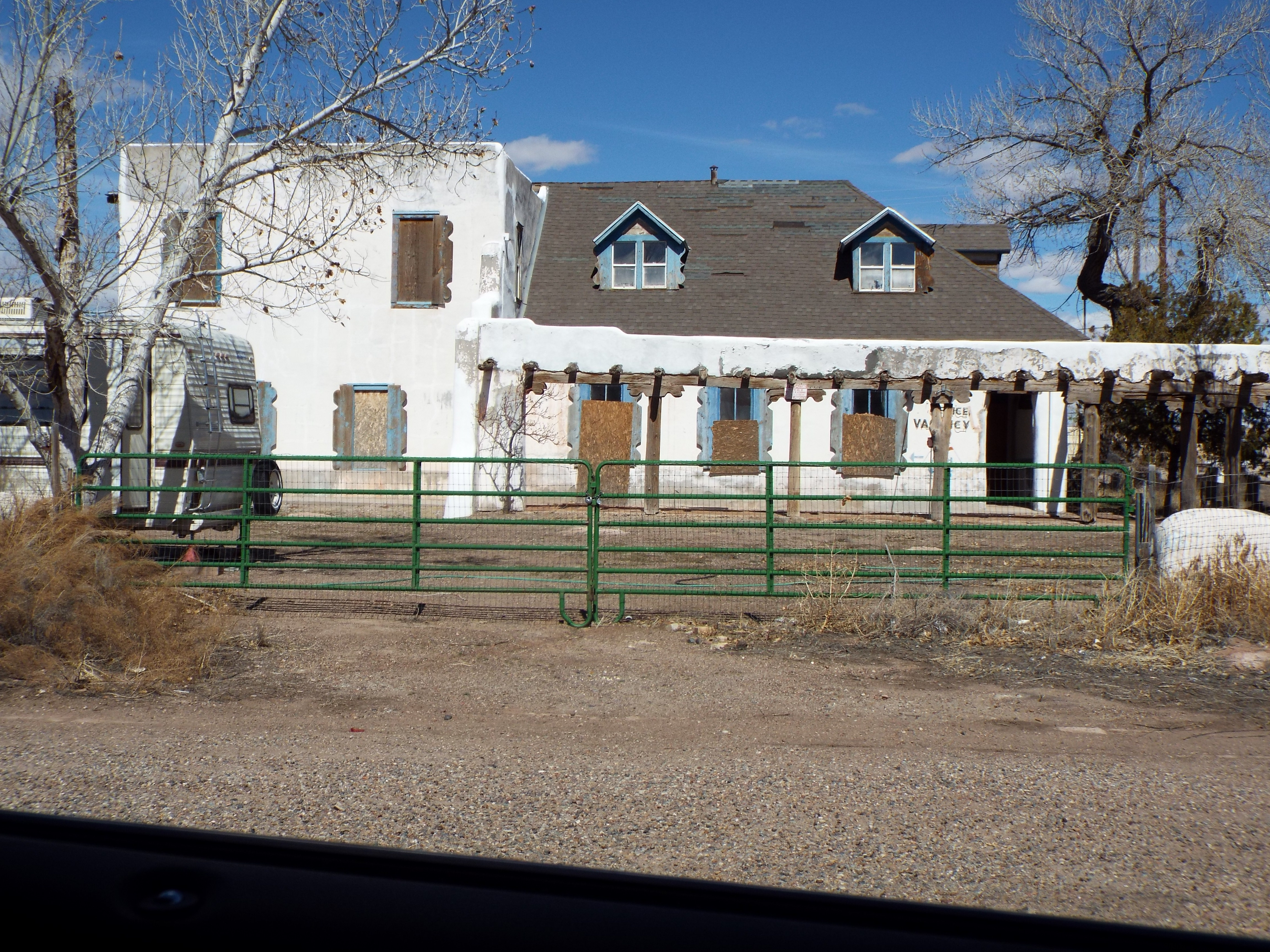
- South Elevation, Arizona Rancho

- Location within Arizona Location within the United States
- Location: Jct. of Tovar and Apache Sts., Holbrook, Arizona
- Coordinates: 34°53′58.3″N 110°9′42.4″W
- Area: 0.3 acres (0.12 ha)
- Built: 1881
- Built by: Montano, Pedro; Higgins, James
- Architectural style: Mixed (more Than 2 Styles From Different Periods)
- NRHP reference No.: 97001210
- Added to NRHP: October 17, 1997

The Arizona Rancho, also known as the Higgins House, Brunswick Hotel and Arizona Hotel, is a former hotel in Holbrook, Arizona, United States. It was originally built between 1881 and 1883 as a residence, the expanded as a boarding house, a hotel, and finally as a motel. The original structure is thought to be the oldest extant structure in Holbrook.

== History ==
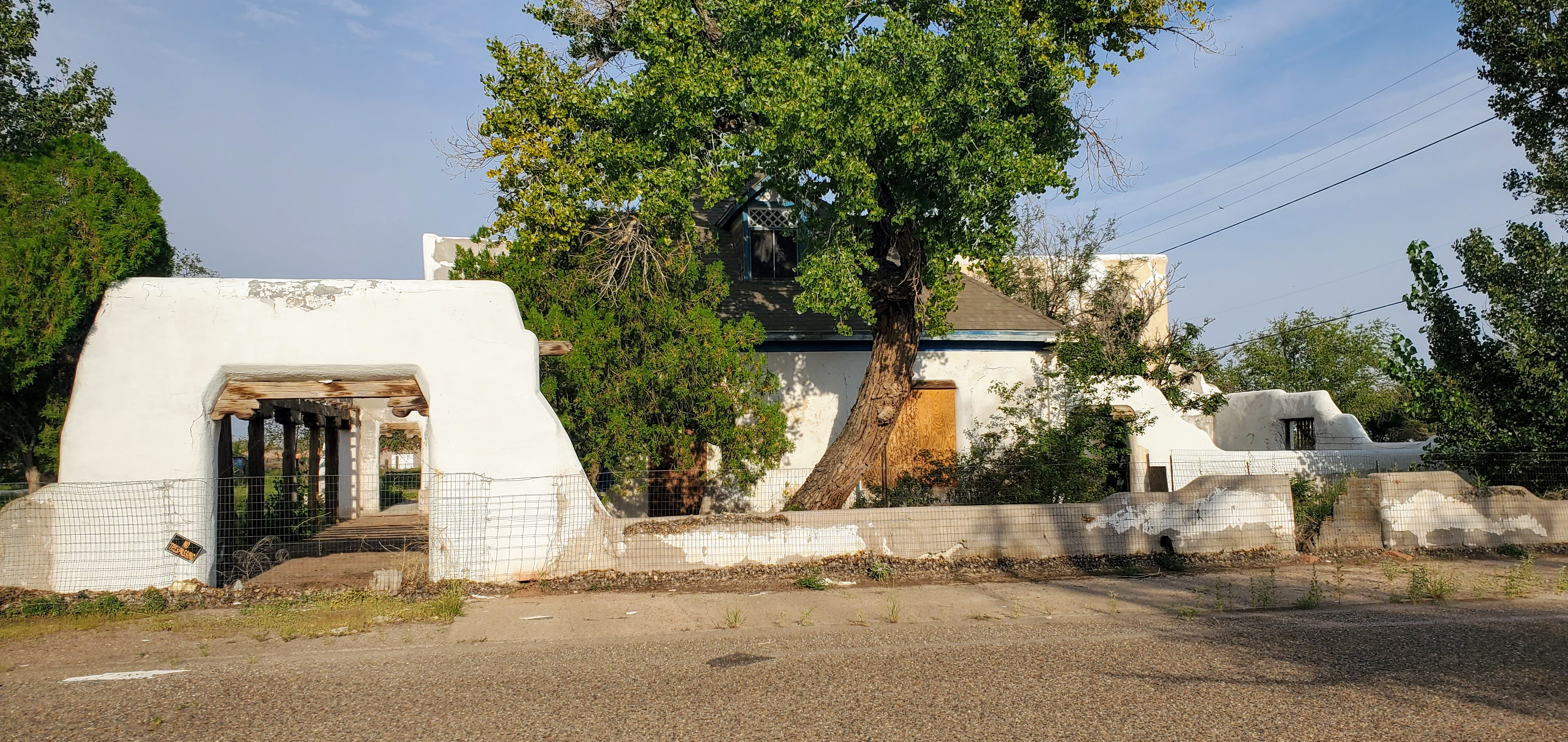
East Elevation, 2022

The original house was built by Pedro Montaño, probably as a single-story house, using plastered adobe. With its dormers and steeply pitched roof, it represents a hybrid of Hispanic and Anglo building styles. The house was expanded about 1885 with a two-story wing of adobe bricks, the Higgins addition, after an 1884 sale of the property to James and Maggie Higgins, who established a boarding house. After several changes of ownership, the Higgins House became the Brunswick Hotel after 1889, operated by John and Anna Connor. The upstairs portion of the addition was used as a dance hall and as a Masonic lodge. After several more changes of ownership, the property was bought by S. Earle Taylor, an oil investor, to house workers. The property has remained in the Taylor family since then. Lloyd Taylor, a geologist, bought the hotel from his uncle.

During the 1930s the west wing of the Brunswick Hotel was Holbrook's hospital. A kitchen addition, necessitated by this change was designed in the mid-1930s by Lorimore Skidmore. Skidmore went on to design the later additions after the hotel became the Arizona Hotel. In the 1940s the compound was enclosed with an adobe wall, and adobe loggias were added, and the hotel's name was hanged again to the Arizona Rancho. During World War II the hotel was leased by Fullerton Junior College to house pilot candidates training for the U.S. Navy at Park Field in Holbrook. The Taylor family added to the complex for their own living quarters at this time.

With the end of the war, business prospered. The hotel catered to tourists going to California on U.S. 66, which ran through Holbrook. However, the main road was farther north, and a new commercial district developed along 66 a few blocks to the north of the old town center, which had been oriented to the railroad line. The construction of Interstate 40 farther away caused further decline, leading to the hotel's closure after some time as a youth hostel.

== Description ==
The Arizona Rancho compound is located on a corner lot to the south of the present Holbrook business district, between the railroad tracks and the Little Colorado River. The buildings are arranged on the north side of the site, facing an open, partially walled parking area. The wall is broken by openings with decorative wagon wheels set into the spaces, echoed by round window openings in the main building with inset wagon wheels. The complex is described as a "hodgepodge" of additions and styles. It retains a general Southwestern style with an emphasis on Pueblo Revival style, mainly expressed in the motel addition. The Montaño residence alone has a steeply pitched roof, partly obscured by a later two-story adobe addition. The motel section is a long, low structure with projecting vigas over the fronting porch. Windows throughout the complex are framed in heavy wood timbers that are flush with the adobe plaster exterior wall finish. The motel wing includes a variety of wall materials, including stone, wood framing covered with stucco, and an adaptation of log-style construction with old wood posts laid up and chinked with stucco.

The Arizona Rancho was listed on the National Register of Historic Places on October 17, 1997. In 2007 plans were advanced to sell some surrounding properties and to restore the Rancho.

== See also ==
- Hotel buildings on the National Register of Historic Places in Arizona
- National Register of Historic Places listings in Navajo County, Arizona
- List of hotels
