= Perkinsville Bridge =

Historic bridge in Yavapai County, Arizona

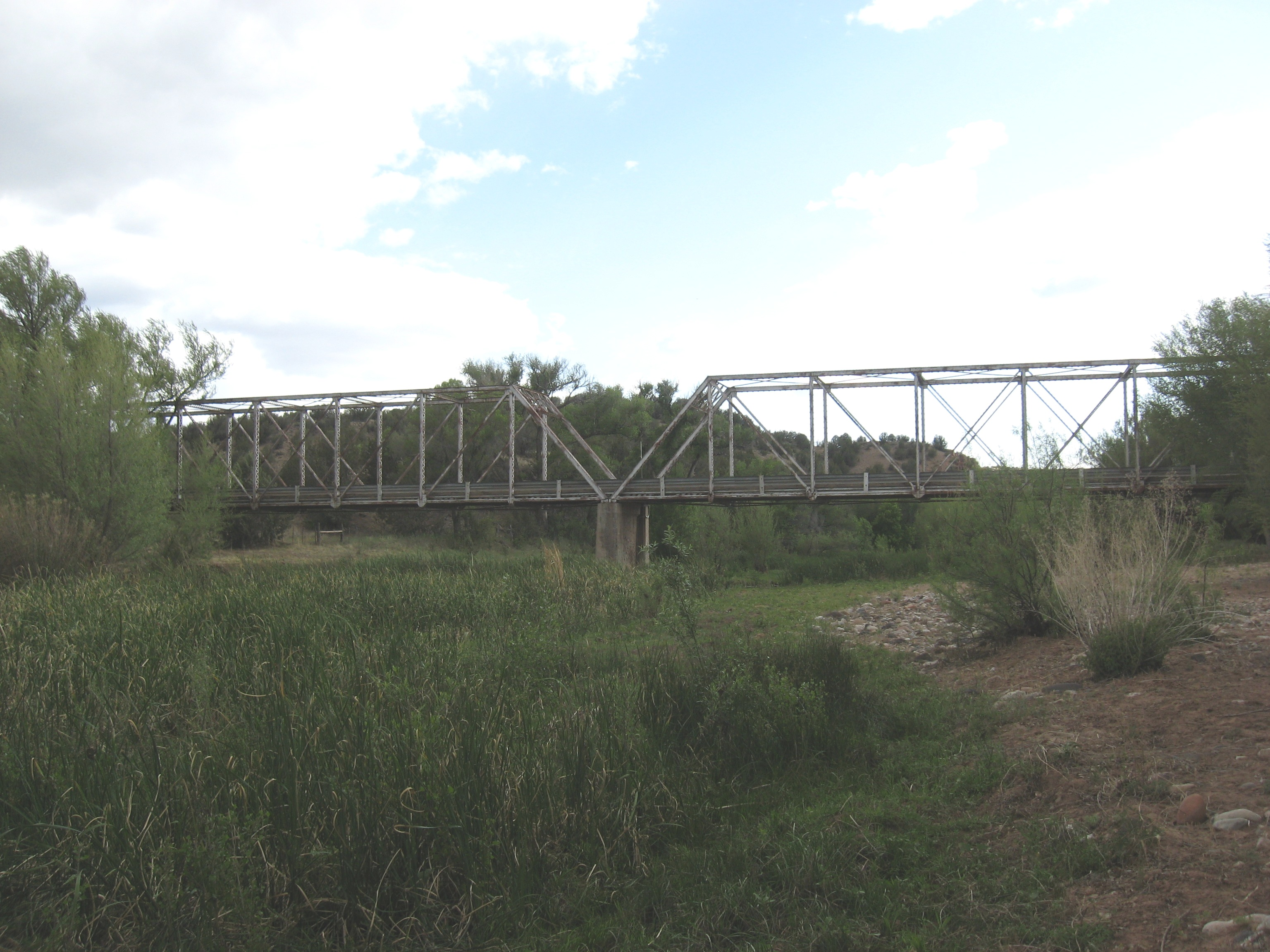
- View showing diagonal element far from center, not crossed, and crossing elements near center
- Coordinates: 34°53′42″N 112°12′18″W
- Carries: Perkinsville-Williams Road (Forest Route 318)
- Crosses: Verde River
- Locale: near Ash Fork, Arizona
- Official name: Perkinsville Bridge
- Other name: Perkinsville Verde River Bridge

Characteristics
- Design: Pratt through truss
- Material: Steel
- Total length: 330 feet (100 m)
- Width: 14 feet (4.3 m)
- Longest span: 139 feet (42 m)
- No. of spans: 2

History
- Construction start: 1913, 1921
- Construction end: 1936

Statistics
- Daily traffic: road
- Perkinsville Bridge
- U.S. National Register of Historic Places
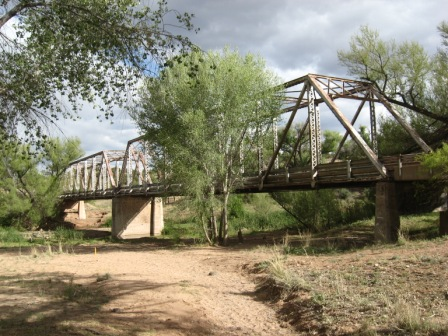

- Location within Arizona Location within the United States
- Nearest city: Ash Fork, Arizona
- Coordinates: 34°53′43″N 112°12′18″W
- Built: 1913; 1921
- Architect: US Indian Service; Et al.
- Architectural style: Pratt through truss
- MPS: Vehicular Bridges in Arizona MPS
- NRHP reference No.: 88001671
- Added to NRHP: March 31, 1989

Location
- Interactive map of Perkinsville Bridge

The Perkinsville Bridge over the Verde River was established in 1936 when it was moved from the San Carlos Indian Reservation over the Gila River. The current structure was constructed from spans of the San Carlos Bridge which was built in 1913 and then rebuilt in 1921 after damage due to flooding. It was listed on the National Register of Historic Places in 1989.

== See also ==
- Verde River Bridge, also NRHP-listed
- Verde River Sheep Bridge, also NRHP-listed
