= Carrizo Bridges =

The Carrizo Bridges are a pair of timber stringer bridges which brought the main cross-continental highway of northern Arizona, the Old Trails Highway, across two branches of Carrizo Wash, an arroyo, in northern Arizona. The highway through this area became U.S. Route 66, and the roadway eventually became a frontage road on the south side of Interstate 40. It is labelled on some maps as Old Route 66. The bridges are also known as Little Lithodendron Bridge and Lithodendron Bridge.

A timber stringer bridge was the cheapest way to span spaces like arroyos. It consists of parallel timber logs laid across timber pile bents. These were by far the most common bridge type built in the state of Colorado, for example, historically.

At least one source has used the term Carrizo Wash to describe the two arroyos, terming them as two branches. The two branches/washes separately run south to the Puerco River, which parallels Interstate 40 to the south. The western one is Little Lithodendron Wash and the eastern one is Lithodendron Wash. Both bridges were constructed in 1932 by contractor Canion & Royden, and both were listed on the National Register of Historic Places in 1988. Nearly identical in their original construction, they are now very different from one another, as the western has been maintained and the other was abandoned and has deteriorated.

== Little Lithodendron Wash Bridge ==
- Little Lithodendron Wash Bridge
- U.S. National Register of Historic Places
- Location within Arizona
- Nearest city: Holbrook, Arizona
- Coordinates: 34°59′27″N 109°54′27″W
- Area: 0.2 acres (0.081 ha)
- Built: 1932
- Built by: Canion & Royden
- Architectural style: Timber stringer
- MPS: Vehicular Bridges in Arizona MPS
- NRHP reference No.: 88001688
- Added to NRHP: September 30, 1988

The Little Lithodendron Wash Bridge, the western one of the pair, has 18 spans and was in excellent condition when listed in 1988. It is located about 13.2 miles (21.2 km) northeast of Holbrook.

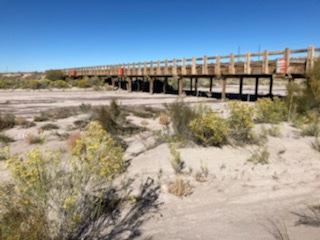
Perspective, in 2021

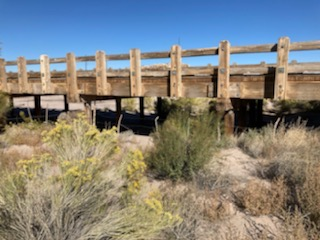
Closer view from side, in 2021

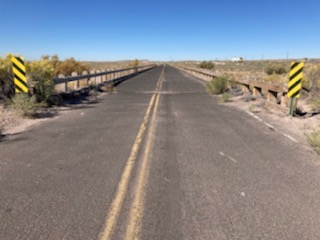
Bridge surface, in 2021

== Lithodendron Wash Bridge ==
- Lithodendron Wash Bridge
- U.S. National Register of Historic Places
- Location within Arizona Location within the United States
- Nearest city: Holbrook, Arizona
- Coordinates: 34°59′27″N 109°54′27″W
- Area: 0.2 acres (0.081 ha)
- Built: 1932
- Built by: Canion & Royden
- Architectural style: Timber stringer
- MPS: Vehicular Bridges in Arizona MPS
- NRHP reference No.: 88001687
- Added to NRHP: September 30, 1988

The Lithodendron Wash Bridge, the eastern one of the pair of bridges, is a 22 span bridge. Located off the Interstate 40 in Navajo County, Arizona about 15.8 miles (25.4 km) northeast of Holbrook, Arizona, it was built in 1932. It was listed on the National Register of Historic Places in 1988.

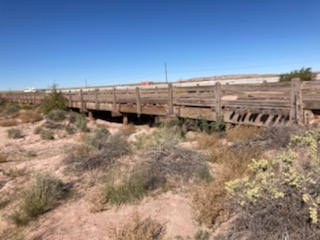
perspective, in 2021

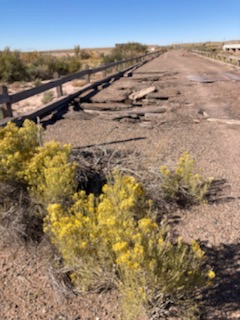
surface, in 2021

== See also ==
- National Register of Historic Places listings in Navajo County, Arizona
