= Agate House Pueblo =

Archaeological site in Arizona, United States

- U.S. National Register of Historic Places
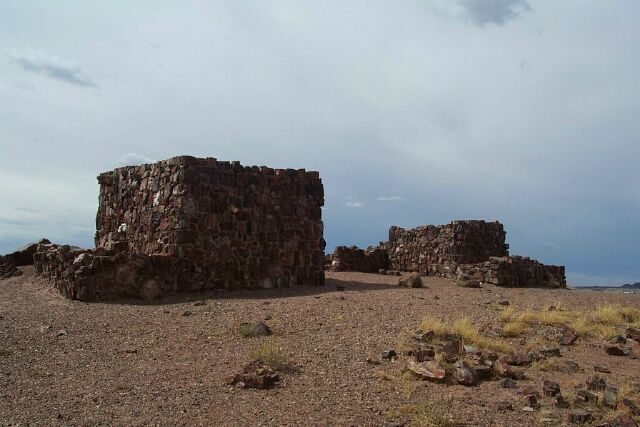

- Location within Arizona Location within the United States
- Nearest city: Holbrook, Arizona
- Coordinates: 34°48′18″N 109°51′40″W
- NRHP reference No.: 75000170
- Added to NRHP: October 06, 1975

Agate House is a partially reconstructed Puebloan building in Petrified Forest National Park, Arizona, United States, built almost entirely of petrified wood. The eight-room pueblo has been dated to approximately the year 900 and occupied through 1200, of the Pueblo II and Pueblo III periods. The agatized wood was laid in a clay mortar, in lieu of the more usual sandstone-and-mortar masonry of the area.

The ruins of Agate House were reconstructed by the Civilian Conservation Corps in 1933-34 under the direction of C.B. Cosgrove Jr. of the New Mexico Laboratory of Anthropology. Room 7 was fully reconstructed with a new roof. Room 2's walls were rebuilt to a height of five feet, but not roofed, and the remaining walls were rebuilt to a height of two or three feet.

== Agate House images ==
Agate House Pueblo
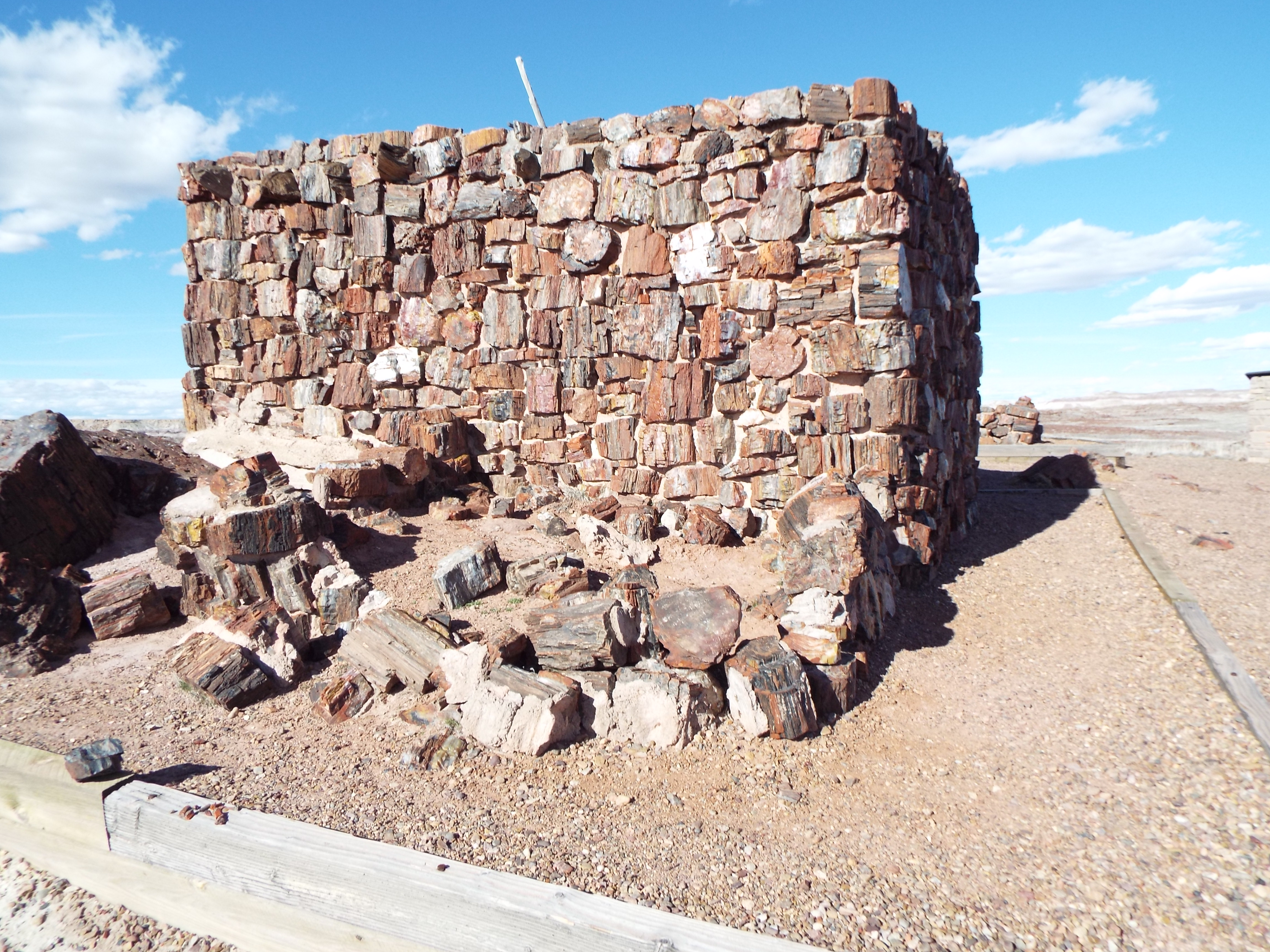
The Agate House

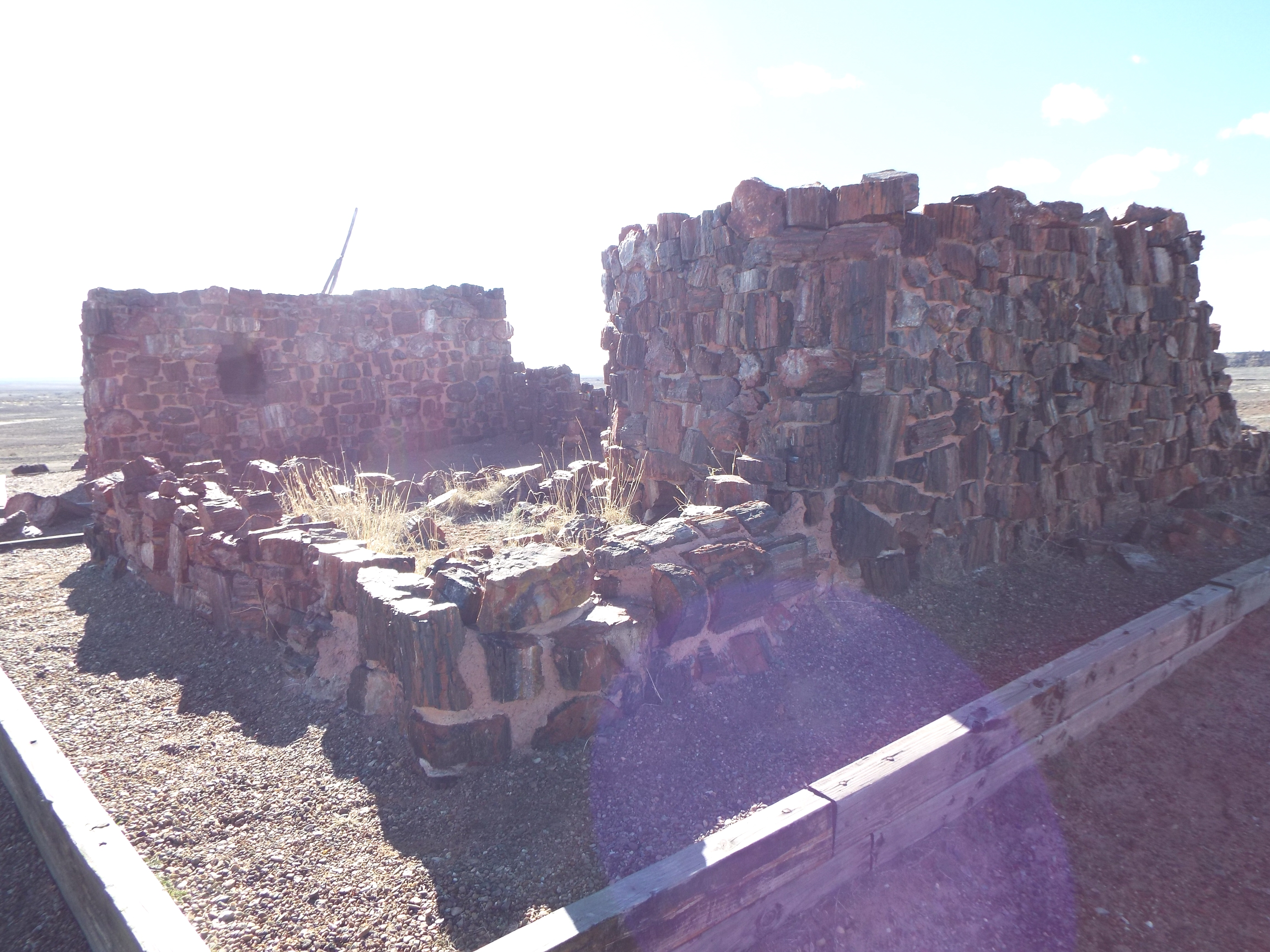
The Agate House

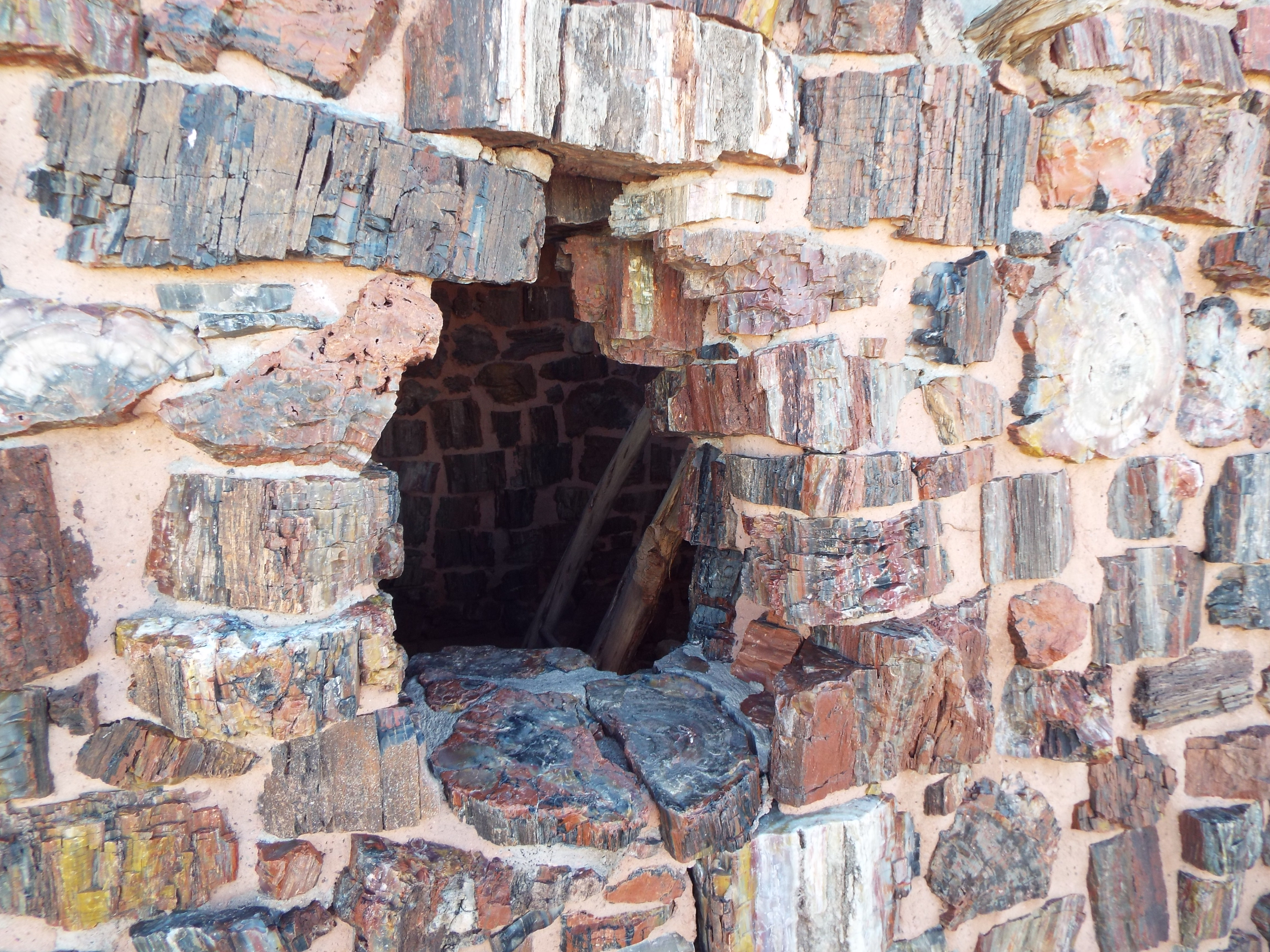
Agate House window

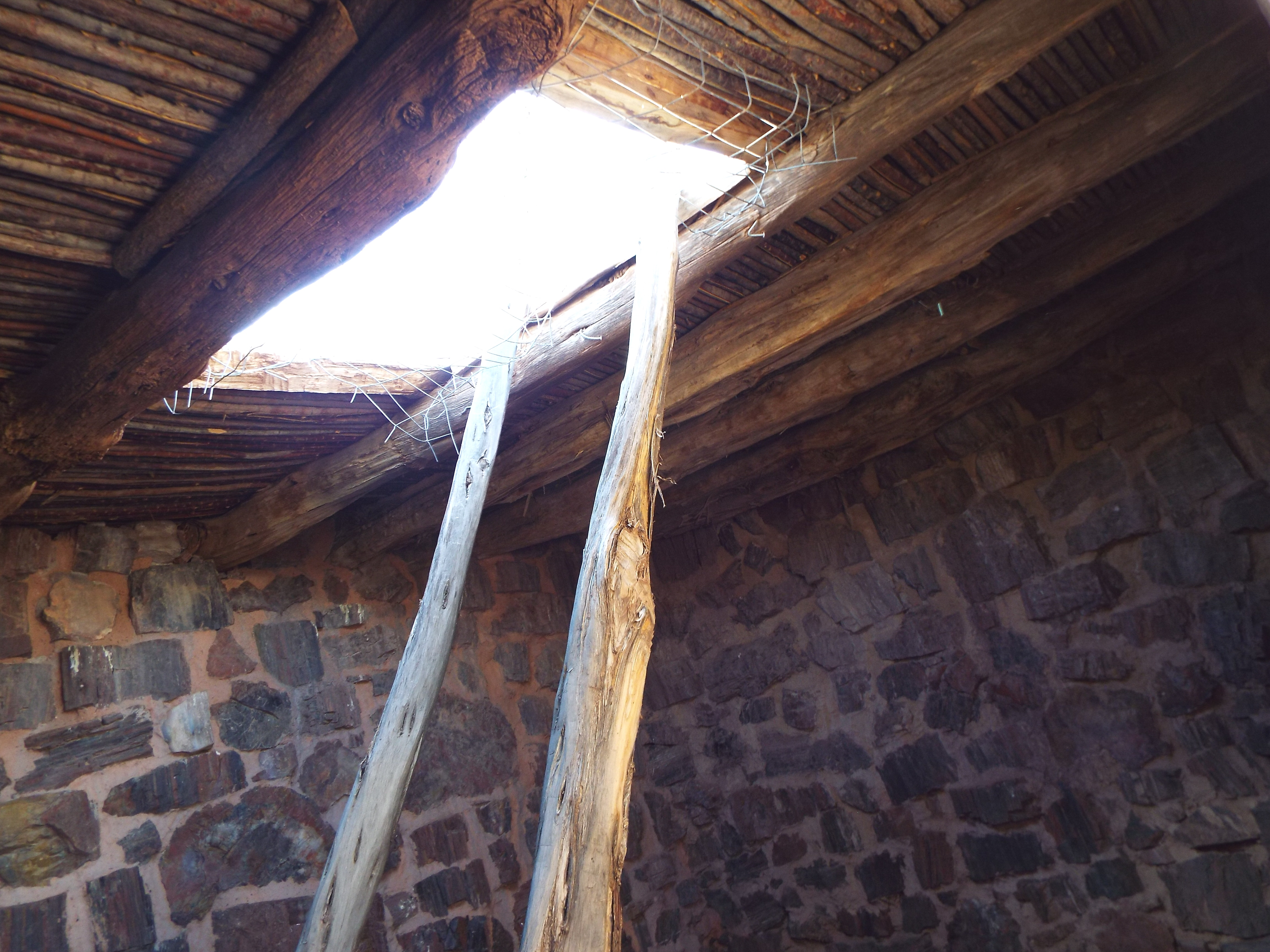
Roof entrance

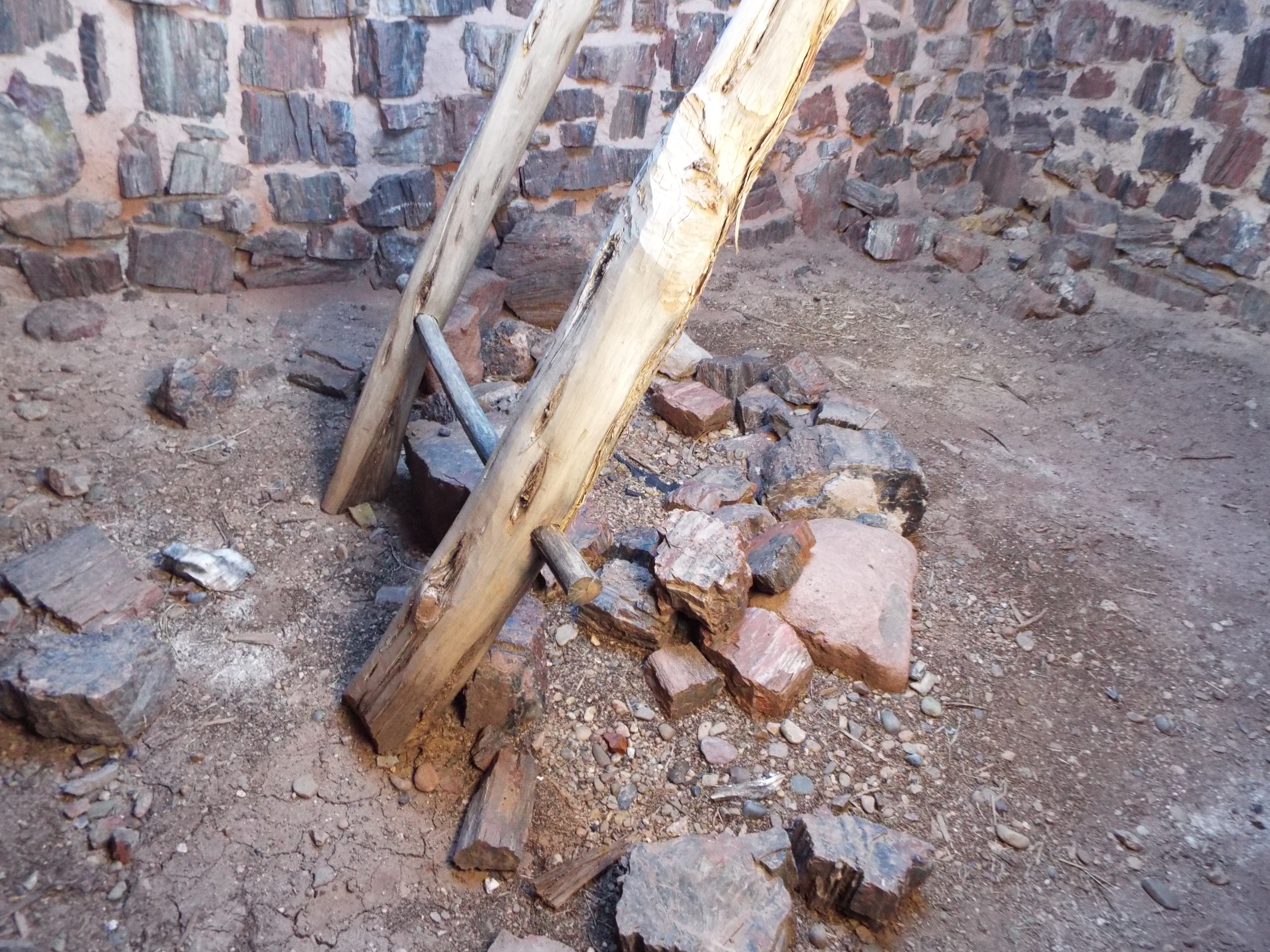
Where the meals were cooked

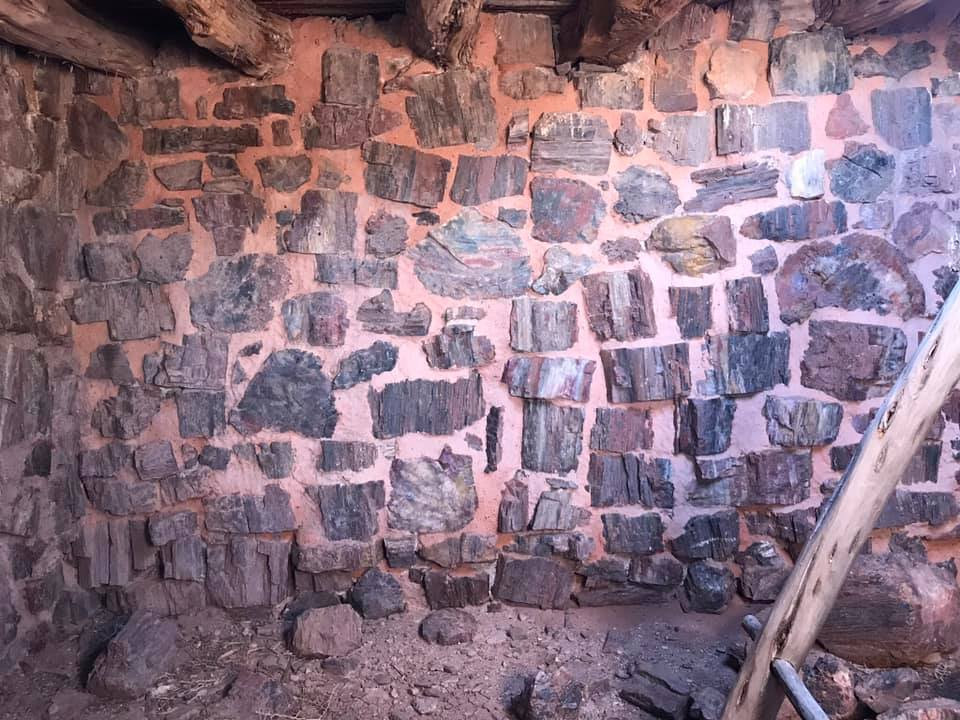
Wall inside the Agate House

== See also ==
- National Register of Historic Places listings in Navajo County, Arizona
- National Register of Historic Places listings in Petrified Forest National Park
