= Verde River Bridge =

Historic bridge in Yavapai County, Arizona

- Coordinates: 34°51′50″N 112°27′32″W
- Carries: Sullivan Lake Road
- Crosses: Verde River

Characteristics
- Design: Filled spandrel arch
- Longest span: 100 feet (30 m)

History
- Construction end: 1922
- Verde River Bridge
- U.S. National Register of Historic Places
- Location within Arizona Location within the United States
- Location: 2.7 mi (4.3 km) south of Paulden, Arizona on Sullivan Lake Rd.
- Coordinates: 34°51′50″N 112°27′34″W
- Built: 1922
- Architect: Arizona Highway Dept.; Lashmet, L.C.
- Architectural style: Filled spandrel arch
- MPS: Vehicular Bridges in Arizona MPS
- NRHP reference No.: 88001639
- Added to NRHP: September 30, 1988

Location
- Interactive map of Verde River Bridge

The Verde River Bridge near Paulden, Arizona, was built in 1922. It was listed on the National Register of Historic Places in 1988.

It is a filled spandrel arch bridge with a 100-foot (30 m) span.

It is located on Sullivan Lake Rd., what is now labelled on maps as N. Old Highway 89., about half a mile from the current crossing of Verde River by Arizona State Route 89.

== See also ==
- Perkinsville Bridge, also spanning Verde River, also NRHP-listed
- Verde River Sheep Bridge, also NRHP-listed
