= Douglas Underpass =

- U.S. National Register of Historic Places
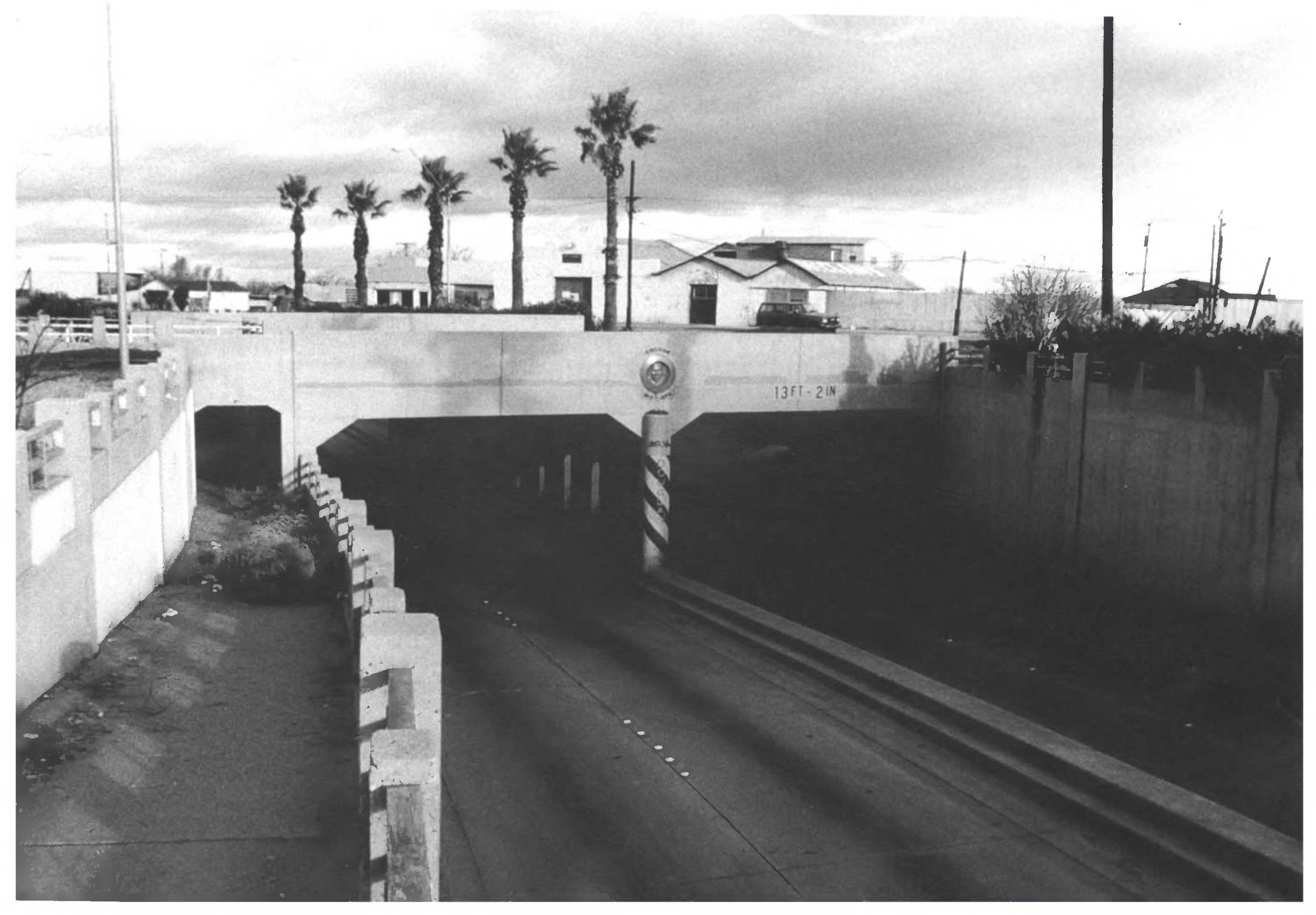

- Location within Arizona Location within the United States
- Location: Douglas, Arizona
- Coordinates: 31°21′01″N 109°33′17″W
- NRHP reference No.: 88001609
- Added to NRHP: June 30, 1988

The Douglas Underpass is a concrete underpass in Douglas, Arizona, allowing U.S. Highway 80 (US 80) to pass under the Southern Pacific Railroad tracks in 1936. It was added to the National Register of Historic Places on June 30, 1988.

In 1935 the underpass was engineered by the Arizona Highway Department, as a two-span reinforced concrete slab. Construction required just under 300 cubic yards (230 m^{3}) of concrete and over 300,000 pounds (140,000 kg) of reinforced steel. Funded by monies from the 1935 federal relief bill, construction began in March 1936 by Jack A. Casson, a contractor from Phoenix, Arizona. He completed the structure by November at a cost of $122,687 (equivalent to $2.17 million in 2024), and the underpass was officially opened on November 7, 1936. When the underpass was completed, it marked the final grade-crossing to be done away with on the cross-country US 80. When the underpass was opened it was met by great fanfare from the town. At the opening ceremony, state highway engineer T. S. O'Connell remarked, "This underpass is one of the outstanding works of its kind not only in Arizona but in the entire Southwest." It functioned unaltered through the 1990s.

In 1999 it was proposed that the underpass was too narrow, and that it should be demolished, and a new bypass created. It was eventually demolished in 2001.
