= Little Lithodendron Wash =

Stream in Navajo County, Arizona

Coordinates: 34°58′22″N 109°57′23″W

Location
- Country: United States
- State: Arizona
- County: Navajo

Physical characteristics
- Mouth
  - elevation: 5,210 ft (1,590 m)

Little Lithodendron Wash (also known as Carrizo Wash or Little Carrizo Wash) is a stream located in Navajo County, Arizona, east of Sun Valley and west of the ghost town of Adamana.

It flows into the Puerco River, a tributary of the Little Colorado River.

The term Carrizo Wash has also applied to Lithodendron Wash, which is a roughly parallel wash just to the east, which also flows into the Puerco River. The two washes are, or once were, considered two branches of this Carrizo Wash.
