= Black Gap Bridge =

- U.S. National Register of Historic Places
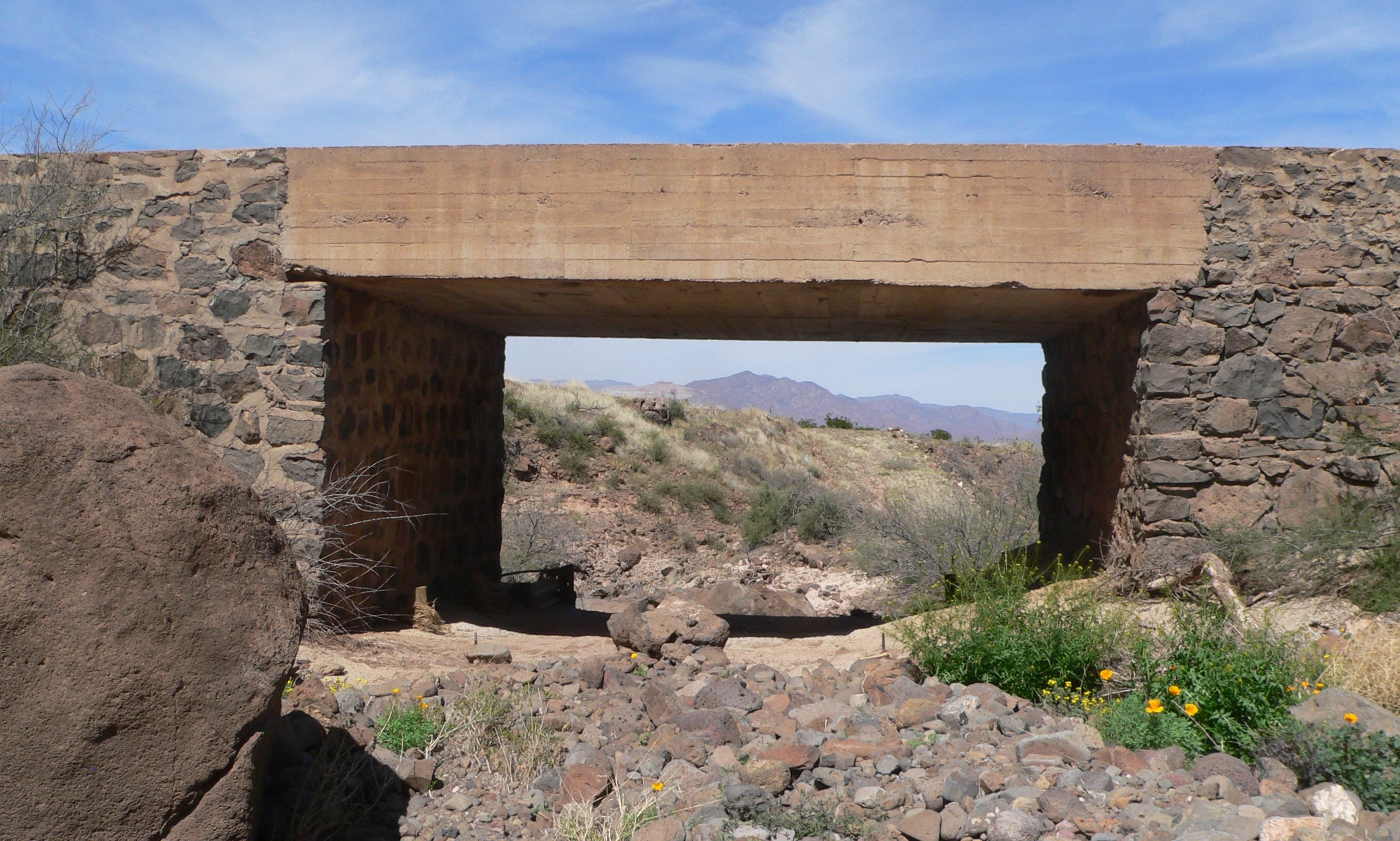

- Location within Arizona Location within the United States
- Location: Old Safford Rd., 7.8 miles southwest of Clifton, Clifton, Arizona
- Coordinates: 32°56′47.4″N 109°19′09.8″W
- Built: 1920–21
- NRHP reference No.: 88001627
- Added to NRHP: September 30, 1988

The Black Gap Bridge on Old Safford Rd., 7.8 miles southwest of Clifton, Arizona, was built in 1920–21. It has also been known as Pumroy Canyon Bridge. It is one of few convict labor-built bridges surviving in the state. It was listed on the U.S. National Register of Historic Places in 1988.

It is a single-span concrete rail top beam bridge, meaning it is constructed with railroad rails reinforcing the concrete slab. The rails are spaced at 24 inches (0.61 m) on center. This type of bridge is only for short spans. It was designed by the state engineer, as the last-completed link in the Clifton-Solomonville Highway across Greenlee and Graham counties. U.S. 666 later took away the majority of its traffic, but it remains as a county route serving local traffic.
