= Homolovi State Park =

Protected area in Navajo County, Arizona, US

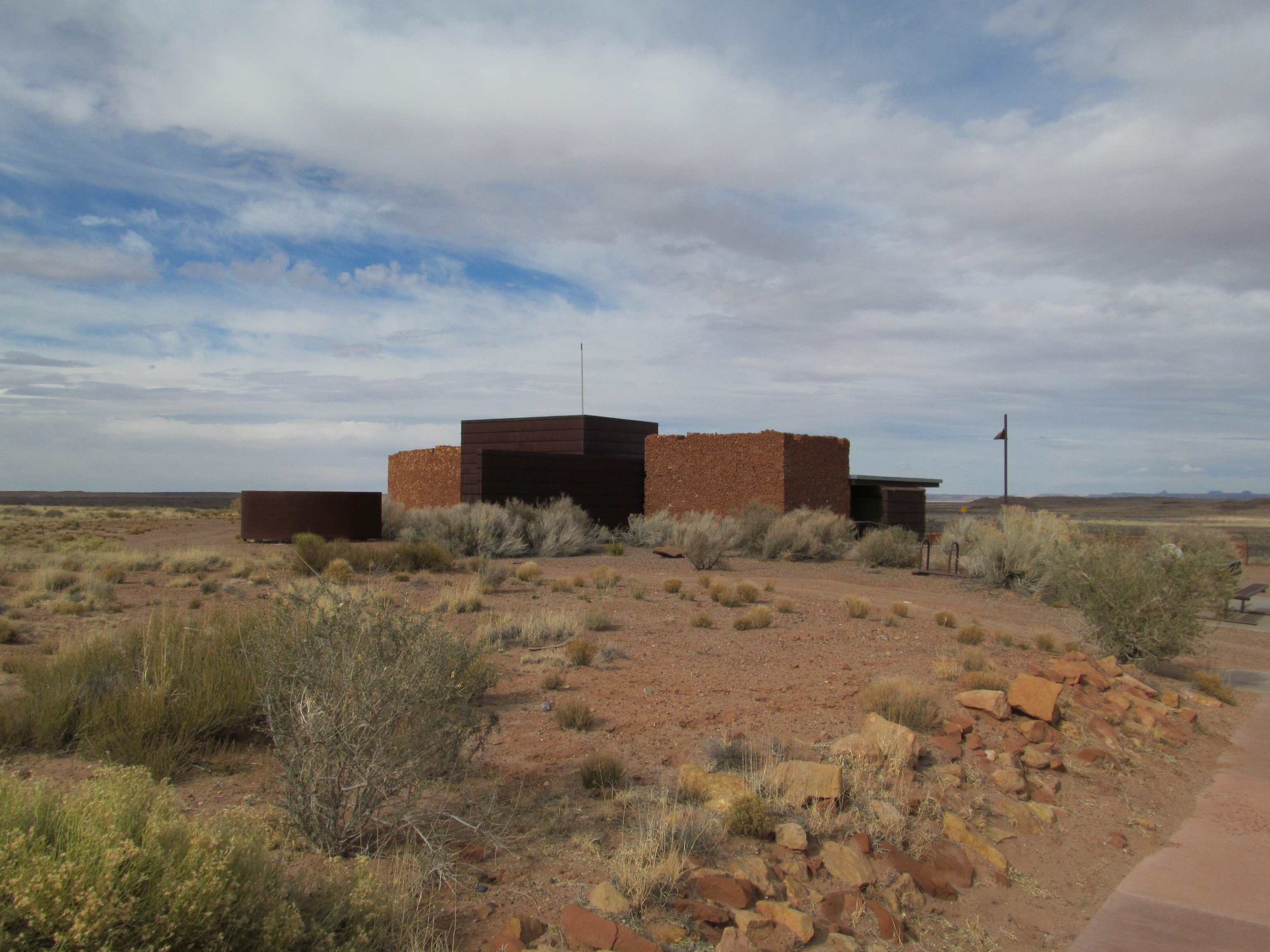
- Visitor Center

- Location within Arizona
- Location: Navajo County, Arizona, United States
- Coordinates: 35°01′31″N 110°37′44″W
- Area: 4,500 acres (1,800 ha)
- Elevation: 4,900 ft (1,500 m)
- Established: 1986
- Administrator: Arizona State Parks & Trails
- Visitors: 20,056 (in 2024)
- Website: Official website

Homolovi State Park is a state park of Arizona, United States, preserving over 300 Ancestral Puebloan archaeological sites. Homolovi or Homol'ovi (the Hopi spelling of the word) is a Hopi word meaning "place of the little hills". The park is located just over a mile north of Winslow, Arizona, and features historical exhibits, interpretive programs, birdwatching, and hiking. There is a year-round campground, restrooms with showers and an RV dump station. The park was closed to visitors from February 22, 2010 to March 18, 2011 due to state budget cuts.

From 1986 to its 2011 reopening, the name of the park was Homolovi Ruins State Park. The Hopi tribe lobbied the Arizona parks board to remove "Ruins" from the name, as the Hopi tribe considers them spiritually alive. During a meeting in Winslow on March 17, 2011, the board unanimously voted to change the name and to add the tagline "ancestral Hopi villages" to the park.

== History ==
The Homol'ovi cluster of archaeological sites includes seven separate pueblo ruins built by various prehistoric people, including ancestors of the Hopi people, between approximately 1260–1400. This fertile area is on a floodplain of the Little Colorado River, and the inhabitants grew cotton, corn, beans, and squash.

The people of this period are called Hisat'sinom, which is the Hopi word for "long-ago people". They are often referred to as Anasazi, as the Navajo guides who helped nineteenth-century anthropologists and archaeologists called them. However, the word "Anasazi" is Navajo for "enemies of our ancestors", and the present-day Hopi population prefer to refer to them as the Hisat'sinom.

Sunset, Arizona—one of a series of farming communities along the Little Colorado River in the late 1870s—was established by Lot Smith and his Mormon followers. Frequent floods forced the settlers to abandon Sunset in the early 1880s, and the community was eventually washed away. The cemetery, located on a small hill overlooking the river, survived and can be visited. Three of Lot Smith's children are among the cemetery population.

Four of the sites are listed on the National Register of Historic Places.

== Exhibits and activities ==
The visitor center displays pottery sherds, baskets, and other artifacts, as well as offering an introduction to the human history of the park area and the flora and fauna of the park. Books and authentic Hopi art works are available for sale.

Out of the seven Homolovi ruins, two are open to visitors. Homolovi II, the largest and most thoroughly excavated site, has a sidewalk and interpretive signs. It was occupied between 1330 and 1400, and has about 1200 rooms. Archaeologists believe that the inhabitants were trading cotton for pottery with the inhabitants of the Hopi Mesas. This ruin also features three large rectangular plazas and about forty kivas (underground ceremonial chambers). There are also several clusters of pit-houses, occupied before 1260, which appear as mere depressions in the earth. Petroglyphs may be seen along certain sections of a nearby trail (Tsu'vo).

Hikers, mountain bikers, and horseback riders can use the 6 miles (9.7 km) of unshaded dirt roads in the park along with the trails leading to archaeological sites.

== Wildlife ==
A bird checklist, available at the visitor center, lists over 100 species that can be found in the area. These include notable species such as hawks, golden eagles, killdeer, Gambel's quail, great blue herons, and red-shafted flickers. Many mammals can also be seen in the park, such as gray foxes, bobcats, badgers, prairie dogs, desert cottontails, jackrabbits, and porcupines. Reptiles found in the area include the Hopi rattlesnake, western king rattlesnake, horned lizards, common collared lizards, bull snakes, and desert spiny lizards.

== Location and visitor information ==
The entrance to the park is located on Arizona State Route 87, 1.3 miles (2.1 km) north of Exit 257 off of Interstate 40.
