= Pinedale Elementary School =

United States historic place in Navajo County, Arizona

- U.S. National Register of Historic Places
- Location within Arizona Location within the United States
- Location: 300 S. Main Street; Pinedale, Arizona
- Coordinates: 34°18′16″N 110°14′14″W
- Area: 3.5 acres (1.4 ha)
- Built: 1939
- Architect: Ella Capps
- NRHP reference No.: 01001301
- Added to NRHP: March 8, 2002

Pinedale Elementary School is a historic school building located in Pinedale, Arizona surrounded by Ponderosa Pine trees. It is owned by Navajo County and leased to Pinedale, Heritage, Inc. a 501c(3).

The building was added to the National Register of Historic Places in 2002.

It is a one-story 84 by 56 feet (26 m × 17 m) building. It has 25 nine-over-nine windows.
