= Hereford Bridge =

- U.S. National Register of Historic Places
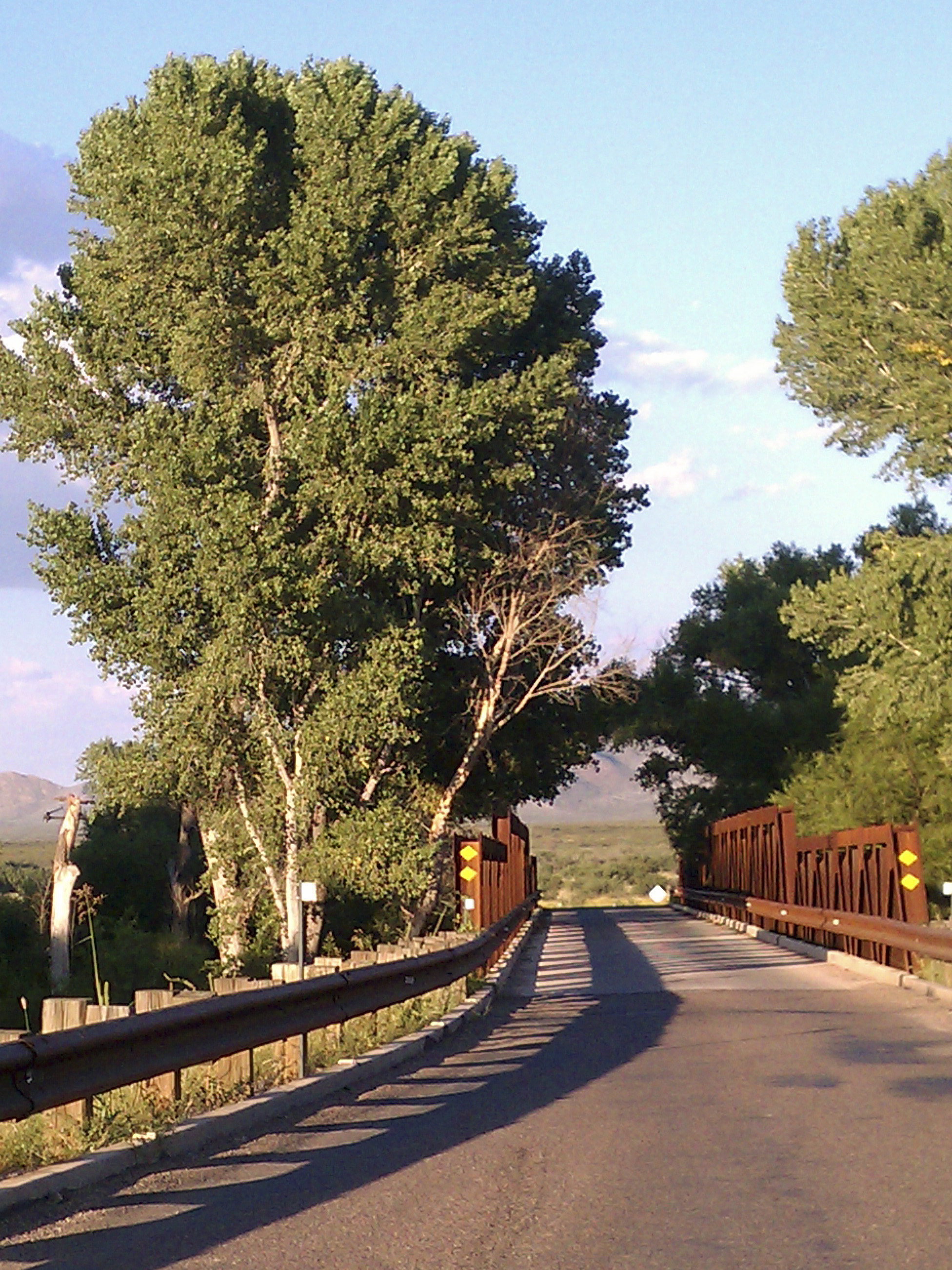

- Location within Arizona Location within the United States
- Location: Hereford Road over the San Pedro River, Hereford, Arizona
- Coordinates: 31°26′18″N 110°06′26″W
- NRHP reference No.: 88001659
- Added to NRHP: September 30, 1988

The Hereford Bridge spans the San Pedro River near Hereford, Arizona, and was built in three stages. The first one was built in 1912–1913, consisting of a single span truss, with steel cylinder piers as supports. It as constructed by the Midland Bridge Company of Kansas City, Missouri for a cost of $3,112, and completed in March 1913. Two years later, Cochise County ordered a second span, as well as moving the original span approximately two-hundred feet upriver. The project was completed in 1915 by Bane and Tarrant, using a superstructure manufactured by Penn Bridge Company of Beaver Falls, Pennsylvania. The third and final stage was done in 1927, consisting of a third pony truss span. It was constructed by the Ware Company of El Paso, Texas, using a hundred-foot truss from the Virginia Bridge and Iron Company of Roanoke, Virginia. While the bridge is typical, the fact that it was constructed in stages is unusual. The span constructed in 1912 is one of the two earliest trusses used for transporting vehicles in Arizona.

The bridge consists of three spans, with a 102-foot span length and an overall roadway length of 267 feet. The roadway width is 15.7 feet. It is constructed of riveted steel, with 10-panel Warren pony trusses, concrete abutments, concrete wingwalls, and concrete-filled steel cylinder piers. There is a concreted deck over steel stringers.
