= Pinedale, Arizona =

Unincorporated community in the state of Arizona, United States

- Unincorporated community
- Location of Pinedale in Navajo County, Arizona.

- Location within the state of Arizona Pinedale, Arizona (the United States)
- Coordinates: 34°19′09″N 110°14′54″W
- Country: United States
- State: Arizona
- County: Navajo

Area
  - Total: 9.68 sq mi (25.07 km^{2})
  - Land: 9.68 sq mi (25.07 km^{2})
  - Water: 0 sq mi (0.00 km^{2})
- Elevation: 6,464 ft (1,970 m)

Population (2020)
  - Total: 482
  - Density: 49.8/sq mi (19.23/km^{2})
- Time zone: UTC-7 (Mountain (MST))
- ZIP code: 85901
- Area code: 928
- FIPS code: 04-55840
- GNIS feature ID: 2582843
- Website: www.pinedaleheritage.org

Pinedale is an unincorporated community in Navajo County, Arizona, United States. The population was 487 at the 2010 census. The elevation is approximately 6,500 ft (2,000 m) and it is part of the Mogollon Rim mountain range.

Pinedale was first known as Mortensen, after the Mortensen and Petersen families who established a Mormon settlement there in 1879. It was also known as Percheron, for the breed of stallions which James Mortensen had brought with him. By 1888, however, the settlement was called Pinedale.

== Pre-history ==
About 220 million years ago, this area was once a swamp land – part of a great inland sea. Because of violent physical upheaval in past ages of time, the Earth's surface has been uplifted to the present elevation of around 6500 feet above sea level. Erosion has exposed the evidence of that past. Petrified wood and rocks containing shells, fossilized plants and animals can be found on hillsides.

Long before the white man arrived, many Native Americans had inhabited the land. Ancient petroglyphs can be found on canyon walls. Ruins of the mysterious Anasazi, Mogollon and other Indians exist in abundance in these hills. In the 19th century, the Apache claimed the area and during the 19th-century Indian Wars, launched a number of attacks on the white settlers throughout the area before they were eventually subdued by the US military.

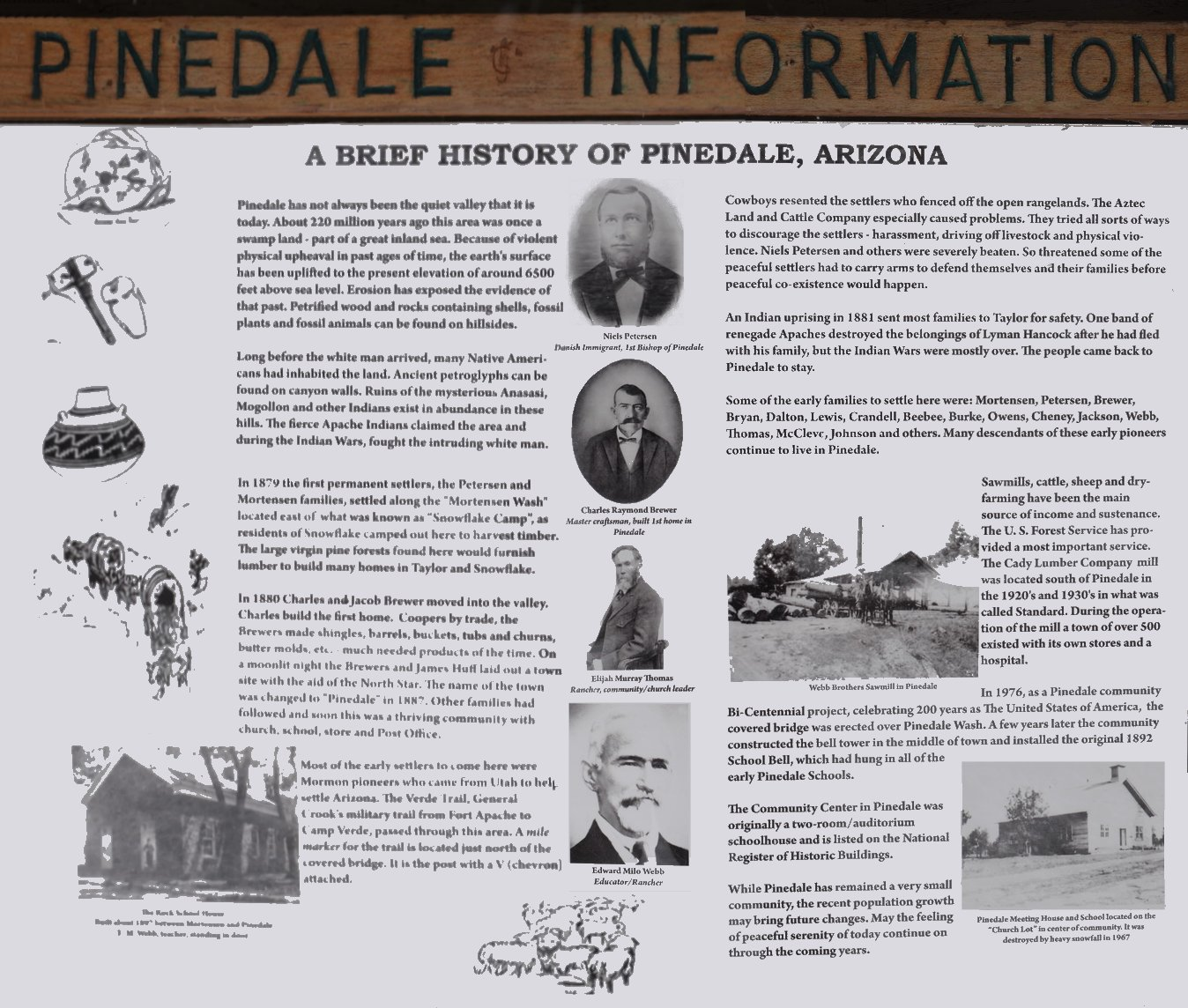
History of the town of Pinedale, AZ – posted in downtown Pinedale

== History ==
In 1879, the first post-colonial permanent settlers, the Petersen and Mortensen families, settled along the "Mortensen Wash" located east of what was known as "Snowflake Camp," as residents of Snowflake camped out there to harvest timber. The large virgin pine forests in the area furnished lumber to build many homes in Taylor and Snowflake. The original settlement came to be known as "Mortensen". Most of the early settlers to come here were Mormon pioneers who came from Utah to help settle Arizona, and the Church of Jesus Christ of Latter-day Saints became a central fixture in the community.

Some of the early families to settle here were: Mortensen, Petersen, Brewer, Bryan, Dalton, Lewis, Crandell, Beebee, Burke, Owens, Cheney, Jackson, Webb, Thomas, McClever, Johnson and others. Many descendants of these early pioneers continue to live in Pinedale.

In the fall of 1880, brothers James and Erastus Willard Mortensen (sons of Niels) secured a government contact to grade a railbed for the Atlantic and Pacific Railroad between Joseph City, Arizona and Winslow; and later secured an additional contract to extend the rail bed to Canyon Diablo. They assembled several work teams from the Mortensen settlement as well as the communities of Snowflake and Taylor for the work. While they were away, an Apache uprising was launched in the area in September 1881; most of the families retreated to Snowflake and Taylor for safety until the US Cavalry overcame the Apaches and they returned to the area in October 1881, about the same time that the rail bed grading contracts were completed.

An Indigenous uprising in 1881 sent most families to Taylor for safety. One band of Apaches destroyed the belongings of Lyman Hancock after he had fled with his family, but the Indian Wars were mostly over. The white Mormon colonizers came back to Pinedale to stay.

In the latter part of the winter of 1882, brothers James and Willard Mortensen went to Illinois and bought back two Percheron Stallions and three mares with the intention of establishing a breeding farm. In June 1883, the Apaches again broke out, and one of the bands came through in the vicinity of the Mortensen ranch and three head of horses were stolen from a small pasture, including one of the Percheron mares, and other horses were stolen from the range. None were ever recovered. That fall the Mortensens traded what Percheron horses they had left to Miner Prisby for his band of horses and cattle.

Cowboys resented the settlers who fenced off the open range lands. The Aztec Land & Cattle Company, formed in 1884/1885 to raise cattle along much of the Atlantic and Pacific Railroad right-of-way in Arizona, especially caused problems in what came to be known as the Pleasant Valley War. The company regularly led assaults against the local settlers – harassment, driving off livestock, burning down building, and physical violence. Niels Petersen and others were severely beaten. These actions so threatened the settlement that settlers had to regularly carry arms to defend themselves and their families until the hostilities finally came to an end in 1892.

The name of the town was changed to "Pinedale" in 1887.

In 1889, Wilford Woodruff, President of the Church of Jesus Christ of Latter-Day Saints called several of the Mortensen and Peterson families to relocate to Mexico and establish a Mormon colony later named Colónia Dublán, about 60 miles south of the US border in Chihuahua State.

== Economics ==
Sawmills, cattle, sheep and dry-farming have always been the main source of income and sustenance. The U.S. Forest Service also provides a presence. The Cady Lumber Company mill was located south of Pinedale in the 1920s and 1930s in what was called Standard. During the operation of the mill, the town grew to over 500 residents, with its own stores and a hospital.

== 1976 US Bi-Centennial ==
In 1976, as a Pinedale community Bi-Centennial project, celebrating 200 years as the United States of America, the covered bridge was erected over Pinedale Wash. A few years later, the community constructed the bell tower in the middle of town and installed the original 1892 School Bell, which had hung in all of the early Pinedale Schools.

== Historic buildings ==
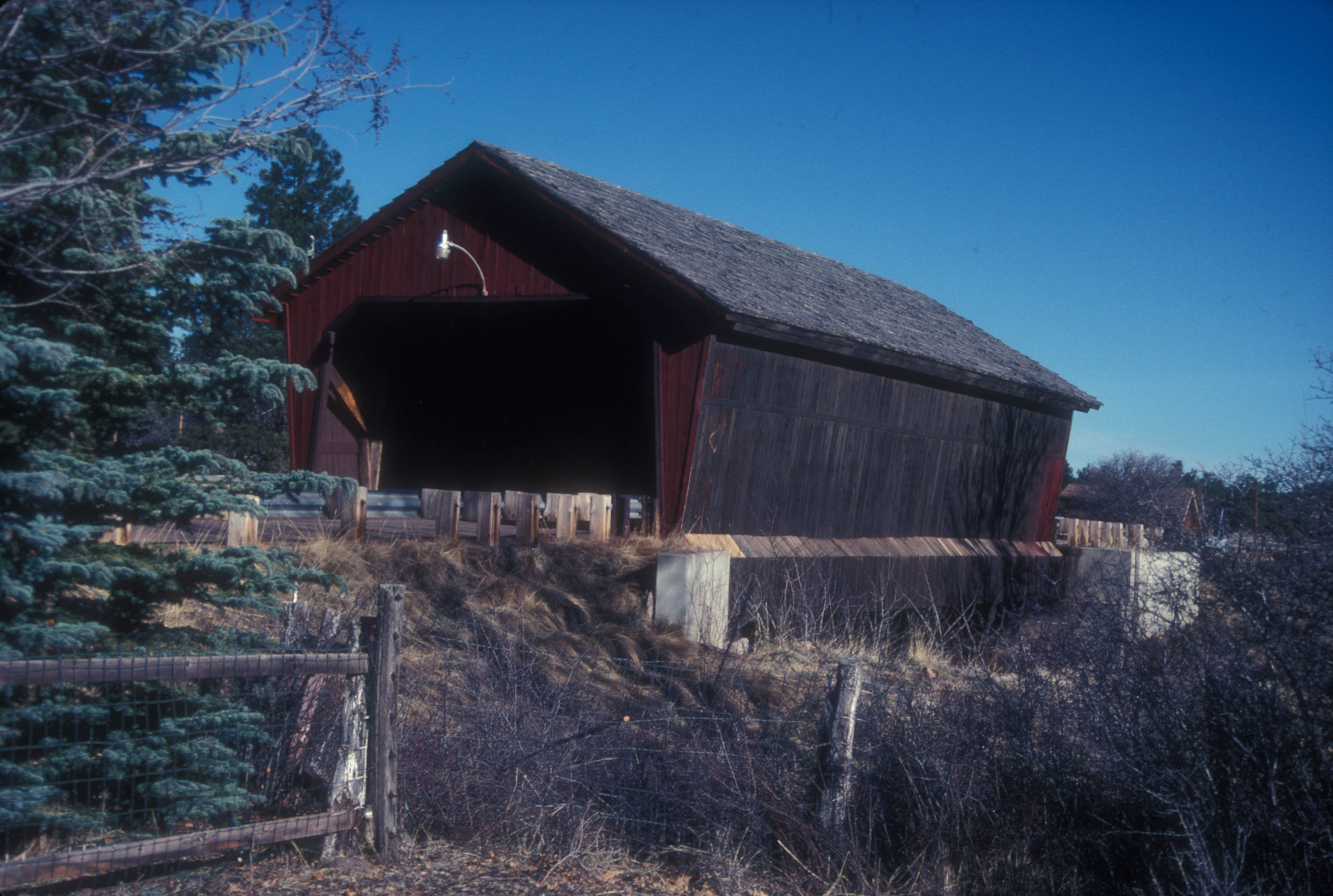
Marreta B. Thomas Covered Bridge near Pinedale

The former Pinedale Elementary School is now a historic building.

The Community Center in Pinedale was originally a two-room/auditorium schoolhouse and is listed on the National Register of Historic Buildings.

The Verde Trail, General Crook's military trail from Fort Apache to Camp Verde built in the late 19th century, passed through this area. A mile marker for the trail is located just north of the Marreta B. Thomas covered bridge (located on the north end of town on the main road into Pinedale from AZ 260). It is the post with a V (chevron) attached.

== Demographics ==
Historical population
Census	Pop.	Note	%±
2000	228		—
2010	487		113.6%
2020	482		−1.0%
U.S. Decennial Census

As of the census of 2020, there were 482 people, 186 households, and 135 families residing in Pinedale.
