= Verde River Sheep Bridge =

- U.S. National Register of Historic Places
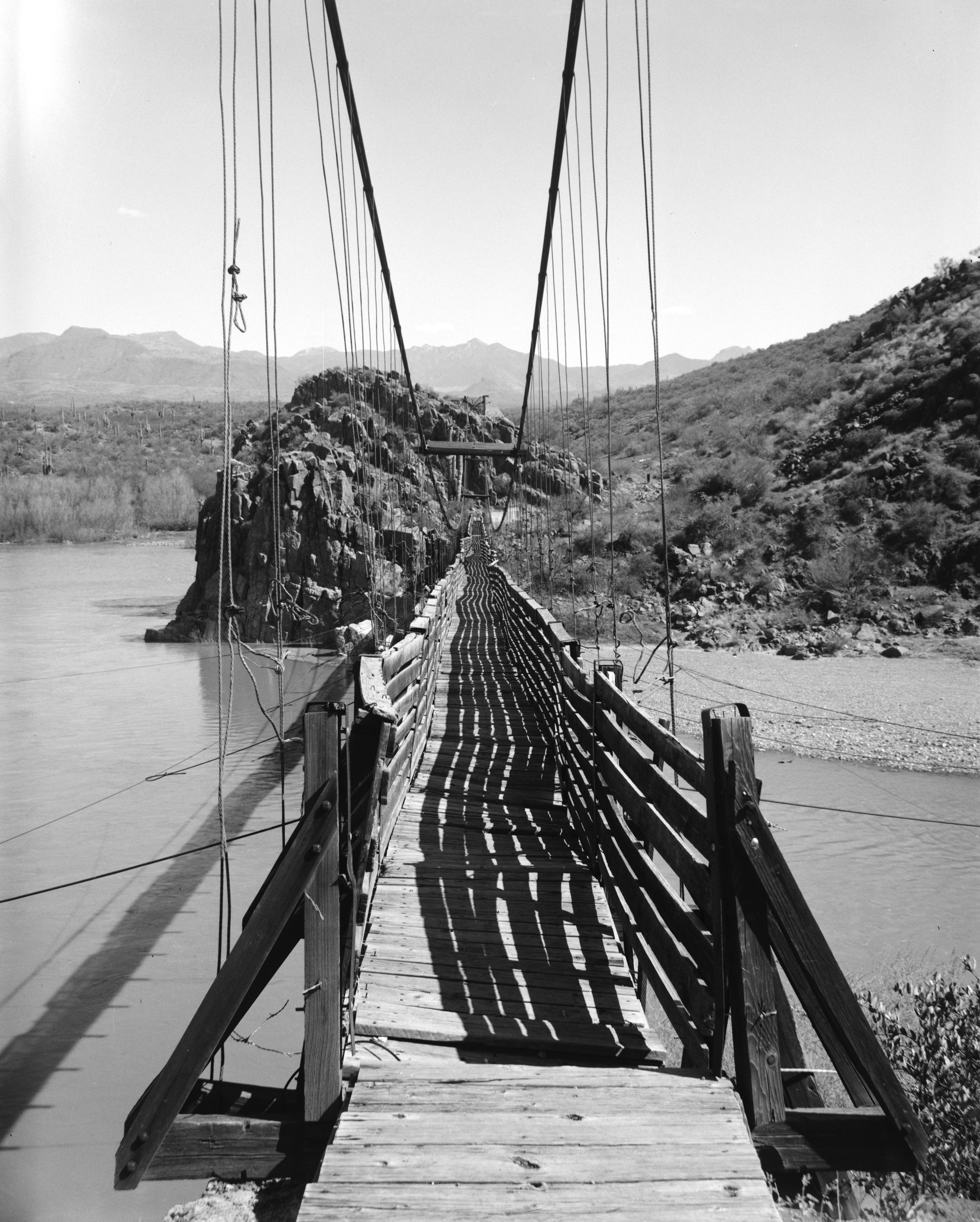
- Historic bridge

- Location within Arizona Location within the United States
- Nearest city: Carefree, Arizona
- Coordinates: 34°4′39″N 111°42′26″W
- Area: 5 acres (2.0 ha)
- Built: 1940
- Architectural style: Suspension
- NRHP reference No.: 78000569
- Added to NRHP: November 21, 1978

The Verde River Sheep Bridge, also known as the Red Point Sheep Bridge, is a suspension bridge which crosses the Verde River in Arizona. Constructed primarily to allow sheep to be driven between grazing ranges on either side of the river. Building started in 1943 and was completed in 1944. Sheep drives stopped in 1978. The bridge was closed in 1987 and largely demolished in 1988. A replica bridge was constructed by the U.S. Forest Service in 1989 to allow hikers access to the Mazatzal Wilderness in Tonto National Forest. The original west suspension tower still remains alongside the replica bridge.

== History ==
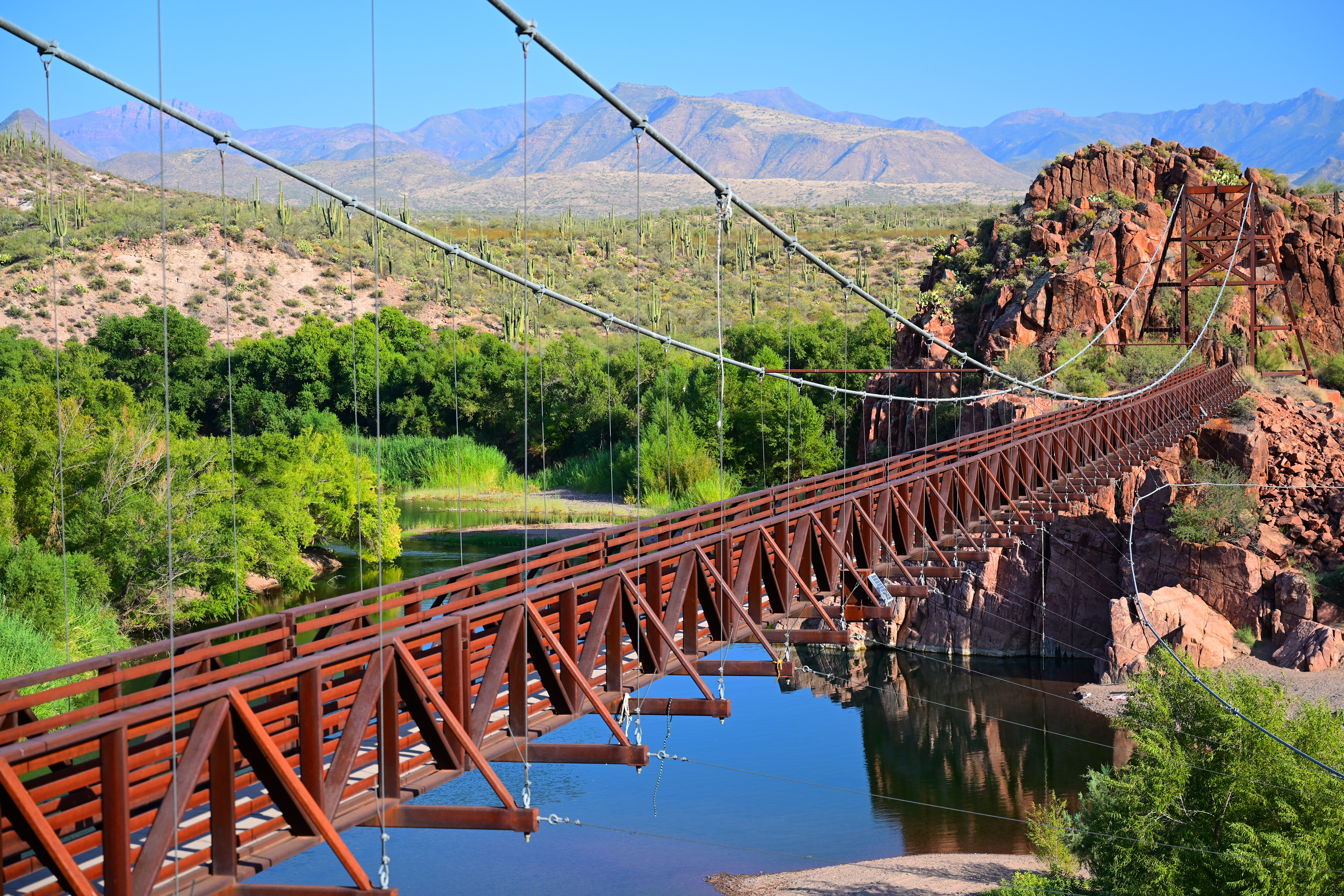
Replacement bridge

Dr. R. O. Raymond of the Flagstaff Sheep Company owned a winter sheep allotment on the east side of the Verde River and a summer allotment on the west side. Access between the sides was difficult, and high water conditions could make it hazardous to ford the river. Raymond decided to fund the construction of a narrow suspension bridge across the Verde to make the crossing easier. A road was built to the bridge site in 1943 and construction was started on a bridge to a design by C. O. Gilliam. It was built using surplus materials from the Bluebell Mine, as well as some cables from the Golden Turkey Mine. The builders were Frank Auza, the Flagstaff Sheep Company's foreman, and George W. Smith, a local builder, with a crew of more than thirty Basque, French Basque, Mexican and Hispanic sheepherders. Auza and Smith visited the Blue Point Sheep Bridge on the Salt River to learn about its construction, deciding to call the Verde River bridge the Red Point Bridge. The total cost of the bridge as originally built was $7,277. Auza maintained the bridge until 1978, when sheep herding was discontinued in the area.

== Description ==
The original bridge measured 691 feet (211 m) overall from anchorage to anchorage and was 45 inches (110 cm) wide, with a clear cable span of 568 feet (173 m). The walkway, whose abutments were located between the towers, had a span of 476 feet (145 m) with a clearance of about 45 feet (14 m) over the river. The suspension span was supported by 1.5-inch (3.8 cm) wire rope with 0.375-inch (9.5 mm) wire rope suspenders 8 feet (2.4 m) apart. The deck and railings are wood. The 50-foot (15 m) tall west tower is concrete. Although Gilliam designed the tower legs as large timbers, they were made of built-up 2x10s which were more readily available. However, this assembly soon deteriorated, so Auza erected formwork around them and poured concrete towers. Sway bracing was provided by wire cable stays.

== Designation and replacement ==
The bridge was placed on the National Register of Historic Places on November 21, 1978. The original bridge was closed in 1987 and was replaced by a replica in 1989. It provides access to the Mazatzal Wilderness in Tonto National Forest. The bridge is maintained as part of the forest's trail system. The original bridge's concrete abutment remains.

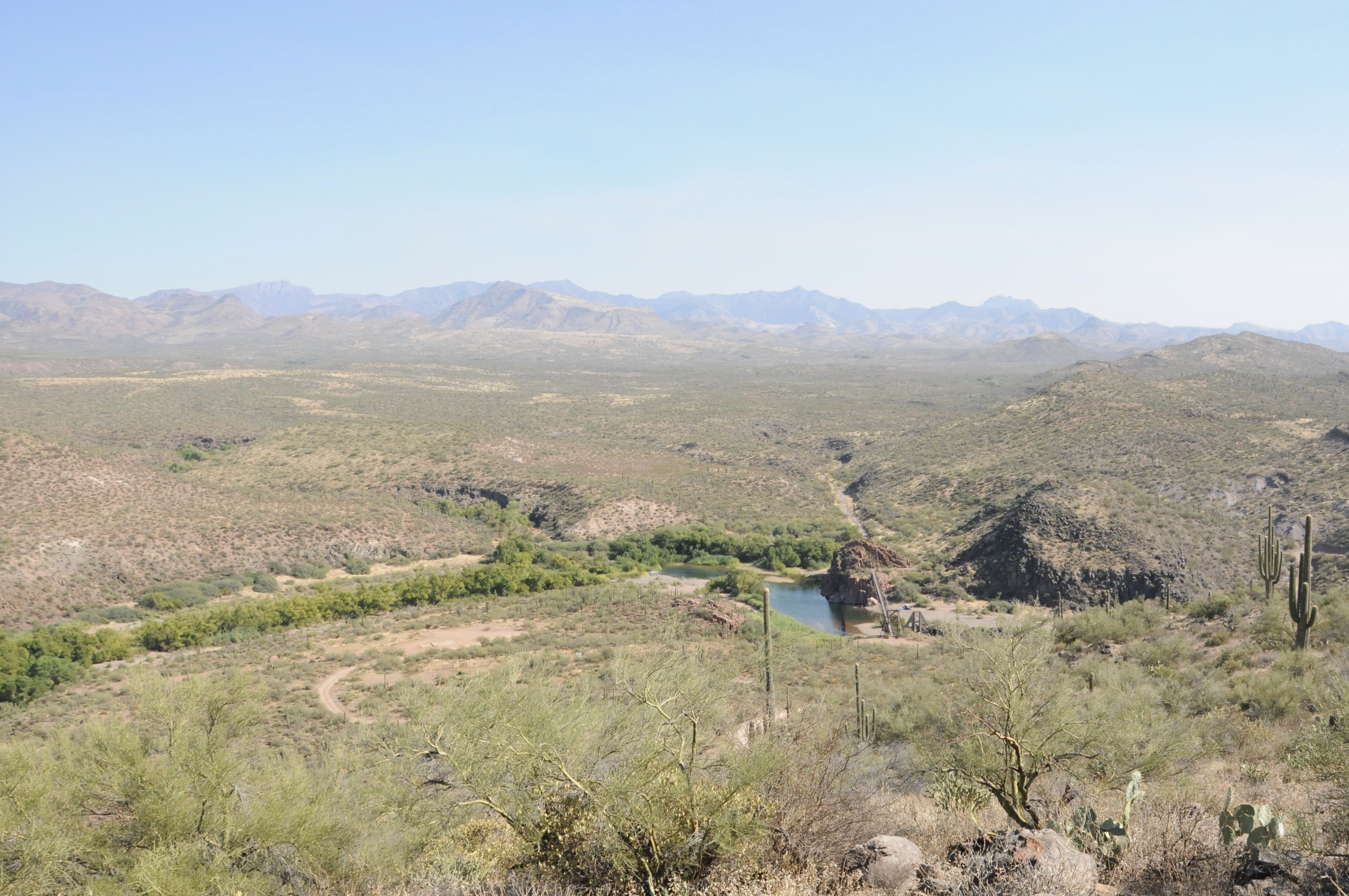
The Verde River Sheep Bridge Is located on a remote section of the Verde River.

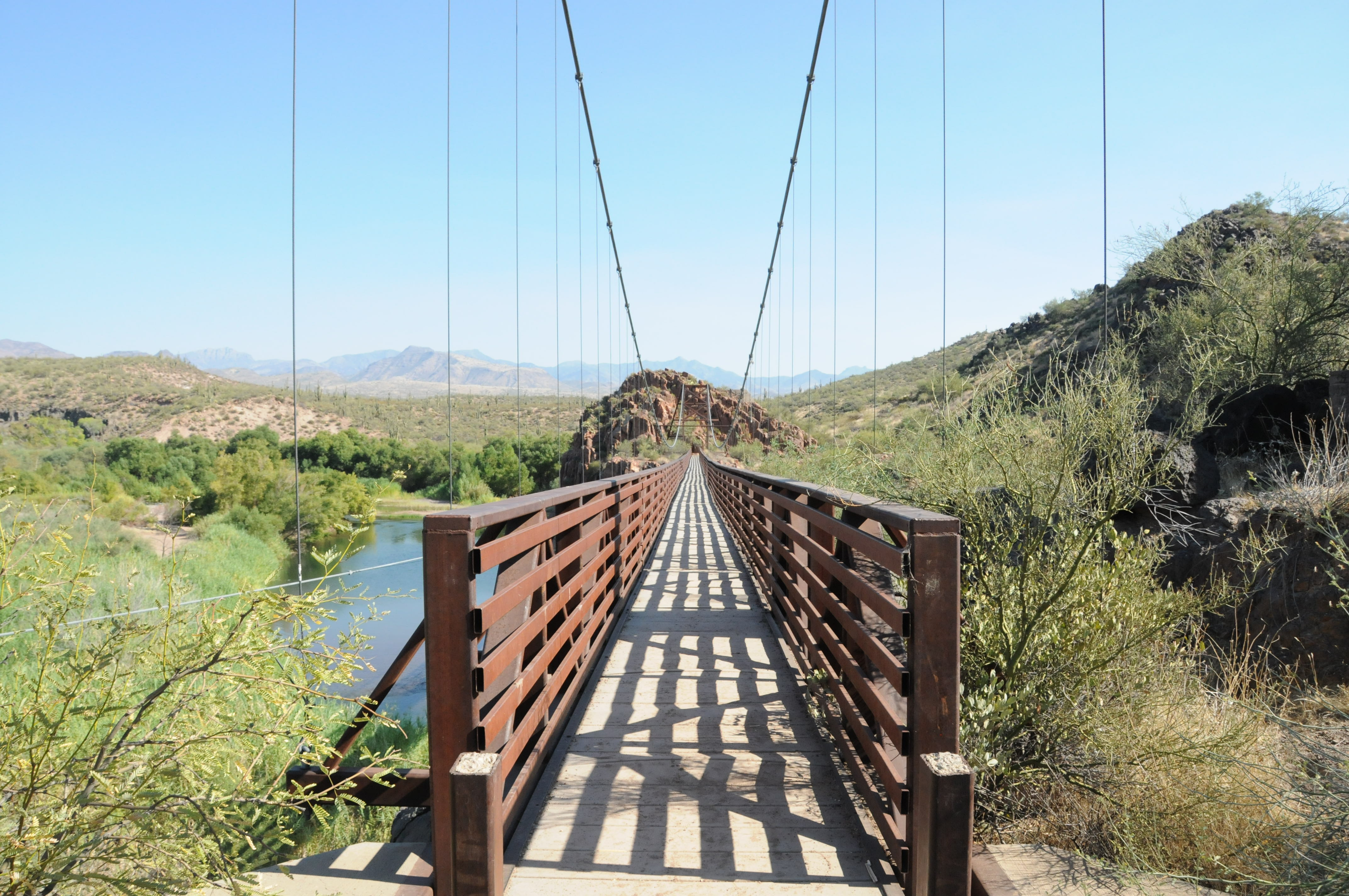
The present Verde River Sheep Bridge - looking across the bridge to the East.

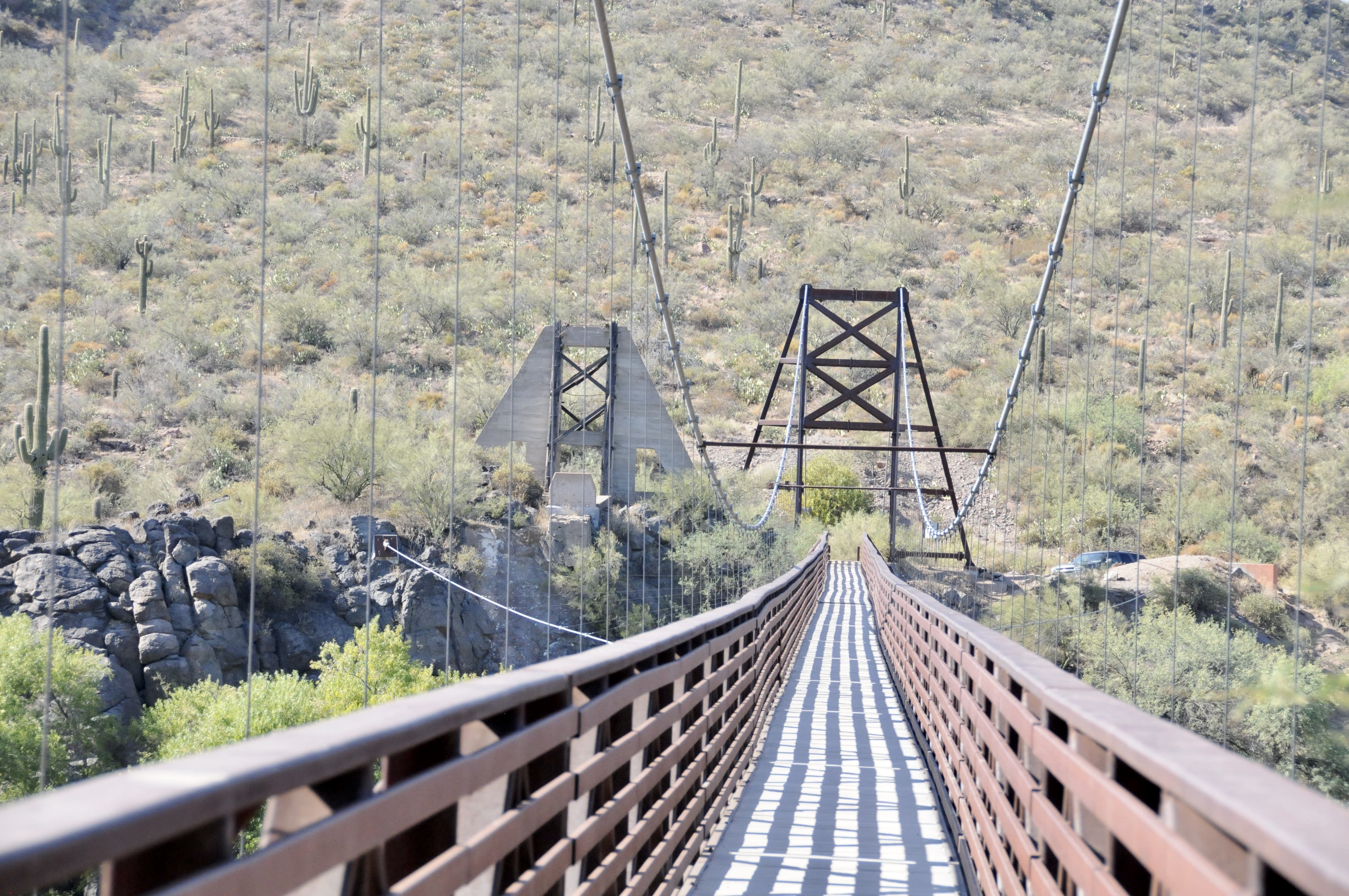
The Verde River Sheep Bridge - looking across the present bridge to the west. The original suspension tower can be seen alongside the present bridge.

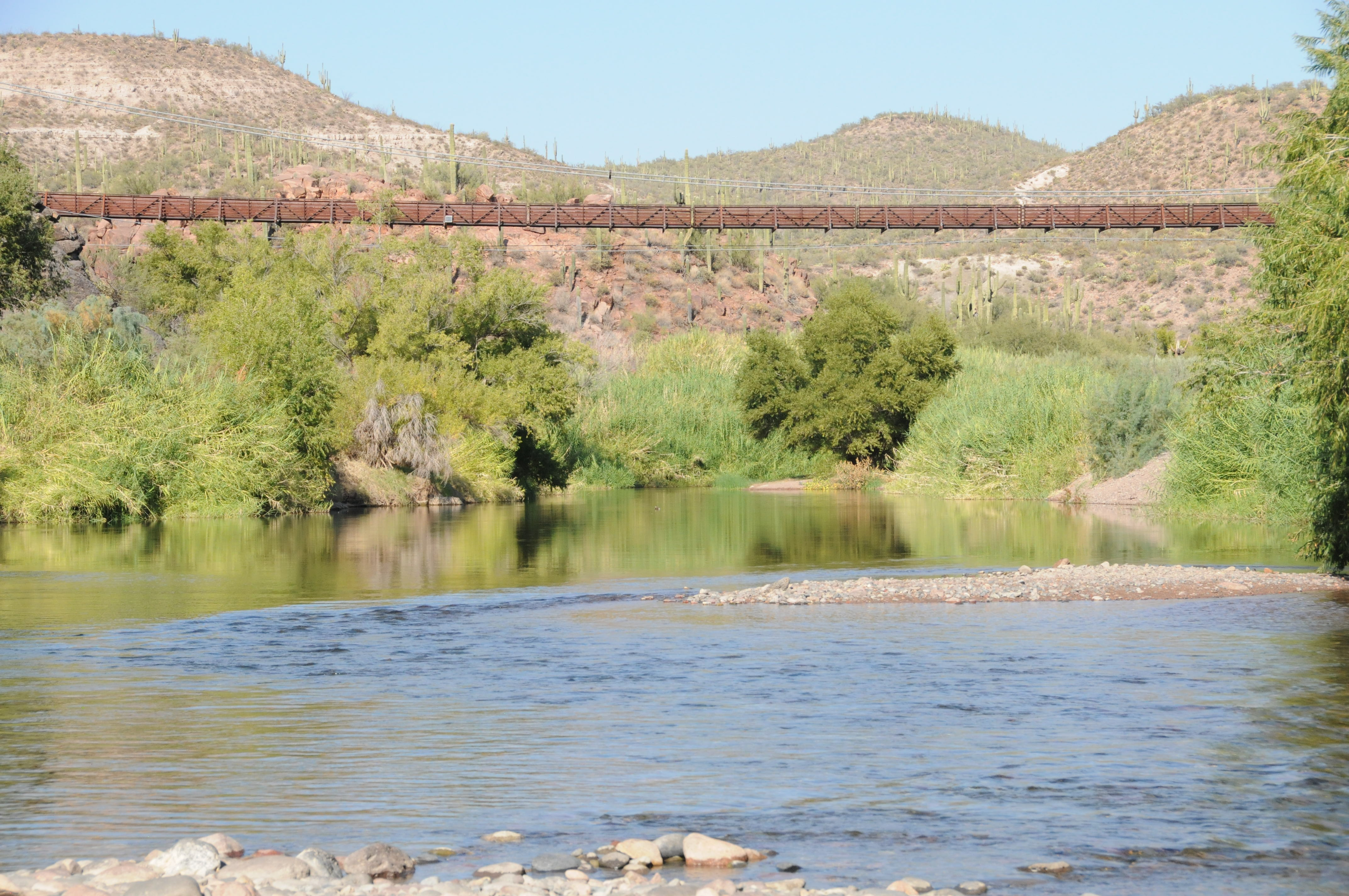
The Verde River Sheep Bridge crosses at approximately 45 feet above the river.

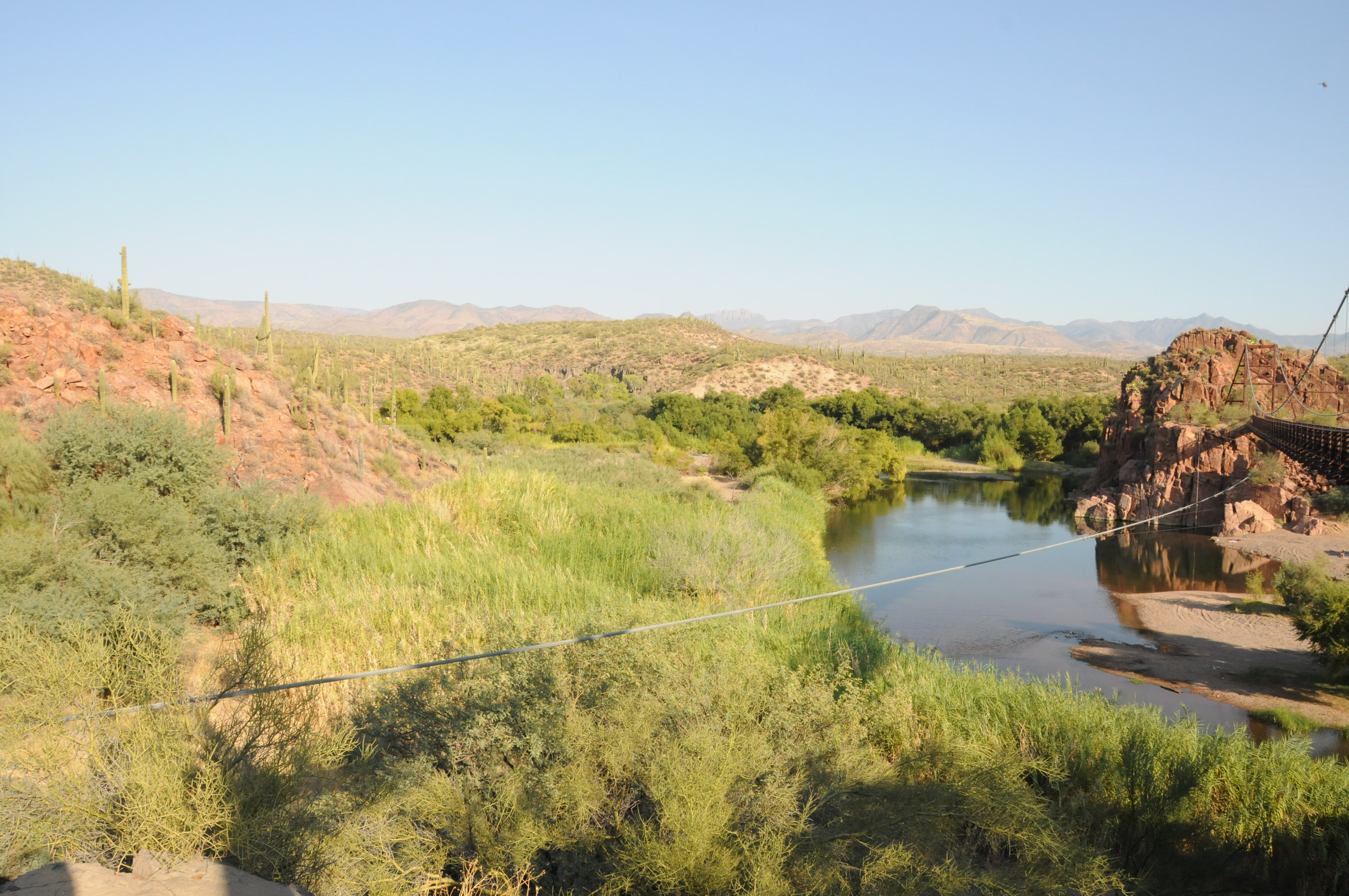
The Sheep Bridge Hot Springs is hidden in the overgrowth of reeds on the west side of the river just up stream from the bridge.

== Hot spring ==
Water from a natural hot spring emerges near the bridge. The 99 °F (37 °C) water is piped to three cattle watering tubs on a ledge above the river.

== See also ==
- List of bridges documented by the Historic American Engineering Record in Arizona
