= State Route 78 (Arizona–New Mexico) =

State highway in Arizona and New Mexico

Arizona State Route 78 and New Mexico State Road 78
- Route 78 highlighted in red

Route information
- Maintained by ADOT & NMDOT
- Length: 34.68 mi (55.81 km): 19.47 mi (31.33 km) in Arizona; 15.213 mi (24.483 km) in New Mexico
- Existed: 1938–present

Major junctions
- West end: US 191 / SR 75 in Three Way, AZ
- East end: US 180 near Cliff, NM

Location
- Country: United States
- State: Arizona

Highway system
- Arizona State Highway System; Interstate; US; State; Scenic Proposed; Former
- New Mexico State Highway System; Interstate; US; State; Scenic
← SR 77	AZ	→ SR 79
← NM 77	NM	→ US 80

Arizona State Route 78 (SR 78) and New Mexico State Road 78 (NM 78) are a pair of adjoining state highways located in eastern Arizona and western New Mexico linking U.S. Route 191 (US 191) and Arizona State Route 75 near Greenlee County Airport to US 180 northwest of Cliff, New Mexico. The Arizona stretch is also known as Mule Creek Road.

== Route description ==
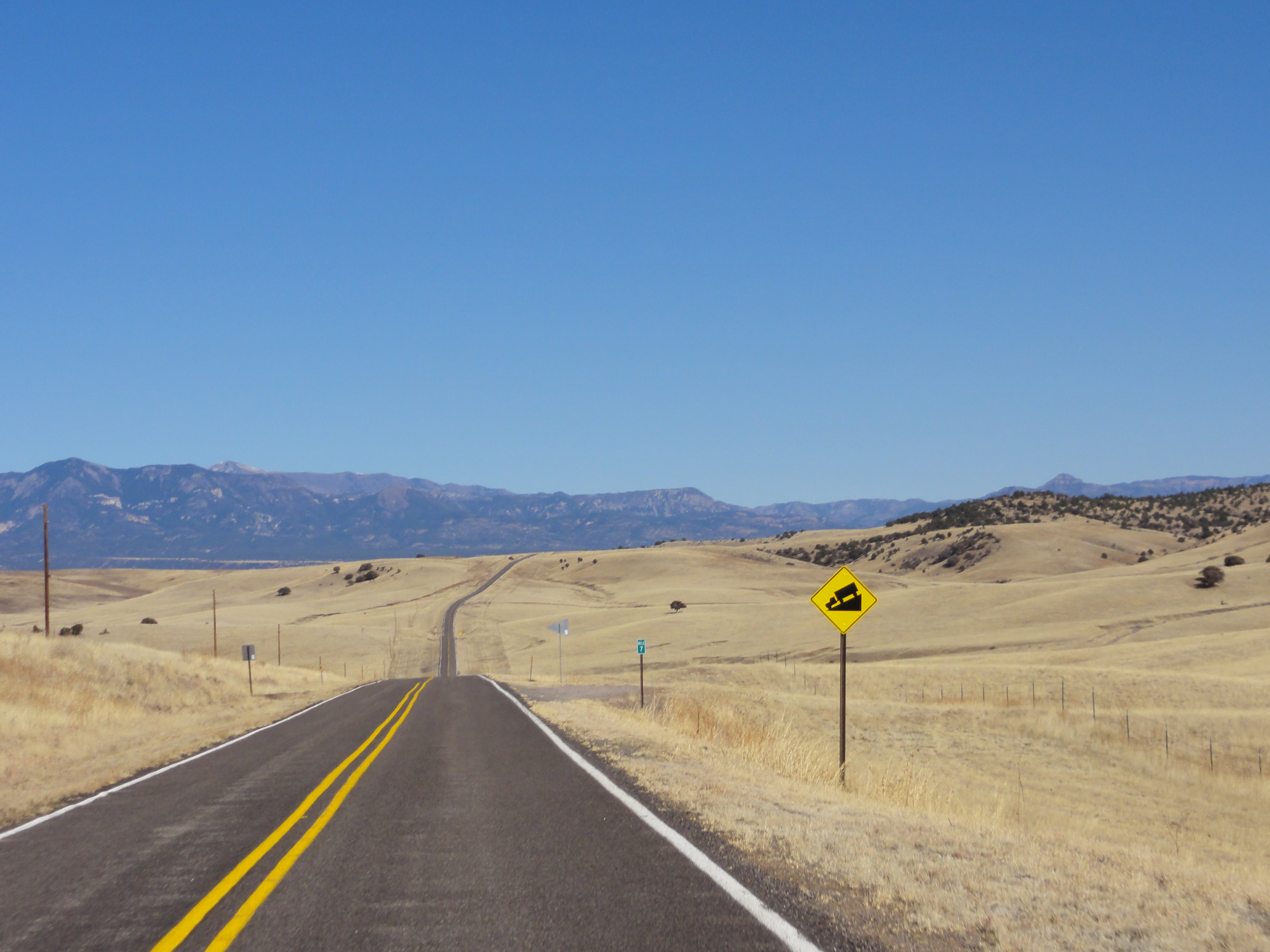
NM 78 at mile marker 7

The western terminus of SR 78 is located at a junction with US 191 and SR 75 in Three Way, Arizona near Greenlee County Airport. The highway heads northeast from this intersection along Mule Creek Road. There are multiple hairpin turns along this stretch of highway as it follows the surrounding terrain. State Road 78 heads eastward through the desert, passing through the community of Mule Creek, New Mexico. The road continues eastward until terminating at U.S. Route 180 northwest of Cliff, New Mexico.

== History ==
Arizona section of the highway was designated as SR 78 on February 17, 1959, and the New Mexico section was designated along its current route in the mid-1930s as New Mexico State Road 78.

By 1938, what would eventually become SR 78 on the Arizona side was still just a gravel road as were many roads in the area including US 666. This section would remain a gravel road until 1961. The other state highways in the area were paved by this time including the majority of the New Mexico section. By 1971, nearly the entire highway had been paved with the exception of a portion near the New Mexico-Arizona state line. It was extended to U.S. Route 60 in New Mexico, going through Mogollon, New Mexico, by the mid-1940s and truncated at its present terminus in 1988.

== Junction list ==
State	County	Location	mi	km	Destinations	Notes
Arizona	Greenlee	Three Way	0.00	0.00	US 191 / SR 75 south – Safford, Duncan, Clifton	Western terminus; US 191 is former US 666; road continues as US 191 south
			19.47 0.000	31.33 0.000	Arizona–New Mexico state line	
New Mexico	Grant		15.213	24.483	US 180 – Glenwood, Silver City	Eastern terminus
1.000 mi = 1.609 km; 1.000 km = 0.621 mi
