= New Mexico State Road 293 =

State highway in Grant County, New Mexico, United States

State Road 293
- NM 293 highlighted in red

Route information
- Maintained by NMDOT
- Length: 4.925 mi (7.926 km)

Major junctions
- South end: NM 211 in Cliff
- North end: End of state maintenance north of Cliff

Location
- Country: United States
- State: New Mexico
- Counties: Grant

Highway system
- New Mexico State Highway System; Interstate; US; State; Scenic
← NM 292	→ NM 294

State Road 293 (NM 293), also known as Box Canyon Road, is a 4.925-mile (7.926 km) state highway in Grant County, New Mexico, United States, that heads north-northeast from New Mexico State Road 211 (NM 211) in Cliff.

== Route description ==
NM 153 begins at a Y intersection with NM 211 in the census-designated place of Cliff. (Northbound NM 211 heads west-southwest to end at U.S. Route 180 [US 180] in Cliff. Southbound NM 211 heads east to connect with the southern end of New Mexico State Road 153, then south to end at US 180.) From its southern terminus NM 293 proceeds northeasterly (leaving Cliff) for nearly five miles (8.0 km) until it reaches its northern terminus at the end of state maintenance and the asphalt pavement. (Box Canyon Road continues north as a gravel road for roughly 11 miles [18 km] before fording the Gila River and ending shortly thereafter.)

NM 293 runs northwest of and roughly parallel to the Gila River. (New Mexico State Road 153 [Turkey Creek Road] follows a similar route northeasterly from NM 211 in Gila for nearly 4 miles [6.4 km] and roughly parallel to the Gila River, but on the southeastern side of the river.)

== Major intersections ==
The entire route is in Grant County.

Location	mi	km	Destinations	Notes
Cliff	0.000	0.000	NM 211 north – US 180 NM 211 south – Gila, US 180	Southern terminus; Y intersection
	4.925	7.926	End of state maintenance	Northern terminus
	4.925	7.926	Box Canyon Rd north	Continuation north from northern terminus; gravel road
1.000 mi = 1.609 km; 1.000 km = 0.621 mi: Route transition

== See also ==
- List of state highways in New Mexico
