= U.S. Route 191 in Arizona =

Section of U.S. Highway in Arizona, United States

U.S. Route 191
- US 191 highlighted in red

Route information
- Maintained by ADOT and the BIA
- Length: 516.50 mi (831.23 km)
- Existed: June 25, 1981–present
- History: Redesignation of SR 63 and part of US 666
- Tourist routes: Coronado Trail Scenic Road; Tse'nikani Flat Mesa Rock Scenic Road

Major junctions
- South end: SR 80 / Historic US 80 near Douglas
- I-10 in Willcox; US 70 in Safford; US 180 from Alpine to St. Johns; US 60 in Springerville; I-40 in Sanders; US 160 in Mexican Water
- North end: US 191 / BIA Route 12 at the Utah state line near Mexican Water

Location
- Country: United States
- State: Arizona
- Counties: Cochise, Graham, Greenlee, Apache

Highway system
- United States Numbered Highway System; List; Special; Divided; Arizona State Highway System; Interstate; US; State; Scenic Proposed; Former
← SR 189	US 191	→ SR 195
← SR 587	US 666	→ SR 789
← SR 63	SR 63 (1961–1981)	→ SR 64

U.S. Route 191 (US 191) is a north–south U.S. Highway in eastern Arizona. The highway runs for 516.50 miles (831.23 km), making it Arizona's longest numbered highway. The highway begins at State Route 80 near Douglas and crosses over the Utah state line near Mexican Water in the Navajo Nation. Between Douglas and Utah, US 191 shares multiple concurrencies with I-10, US 70, US 180, US 60, SR 61, I-40, SR 264, and US 160.

Until 1981, the route taken by US 191 between I-40 in Chambers and the Utah state line was designated as SR 63. The route from SR 80 in Douglas to I-40 in Sanders was originally designated as part of US 666. US 666 was often associated with the biblical devil, due to the number 666 occasionally being considered the "number of the beast." The highway number caused discomfort with the general public and led to the constant sign theft of US 666 markers along the highway, prompting the redesignation of US 666 as a section of US 191 in 1992.

== Route description ==
With a total length of 516.50 miles (831.23 kilometres), the section of U.S. Route 191 (US 191) through Arizona has the longest distance of any numbered highway within the state. US 191 almost traverses the entire length of Arizona, but just short of the Mexican border at SR 80 near Douglas. However, the route is connected to the border via SR 80 and US 191 Business (which has no direct connection to US 191 proper). Large sections of the serpentine route taken by US 191 are indirect and include switchbacks in the mountainous regions near Alpine. Part of US 191 is designated as the Coronado Trail Scenic Byway, between Clifton and Springerville.

=== Douglas to Safford ===
The national southern terminus of US 191 is located at an intersection with SR 80 west of Douglas, in Cochise County. It heads north from this junction, past Bisbee Douglas International Airport and then through the unincorporated communities of McNeal and Elfrida before passing by Sunizona and the western terminus of SR 181, which provides access to Chiricahua National Park. The road curves west and heads toward Sunsites, where it turns to the northwest and passes by the community of Cochise with a bridge over the Union Pacific Railroad. Continuing northwest, US 191 meets Interstate 10 at Exit 331, a trumpet interchange, and has a concurrency with I-10 for about 21 miles (34 kilometres). Heading northeast, I-10/US 191 passes around Willcox, with three exits serving the town: Exit 336, which is the southwestern end of the Willcox I-10 Business Loop; Exit 340, which is the northern terminus of SR 186; and Exit 344, which serves as the north end of the Business Loop.

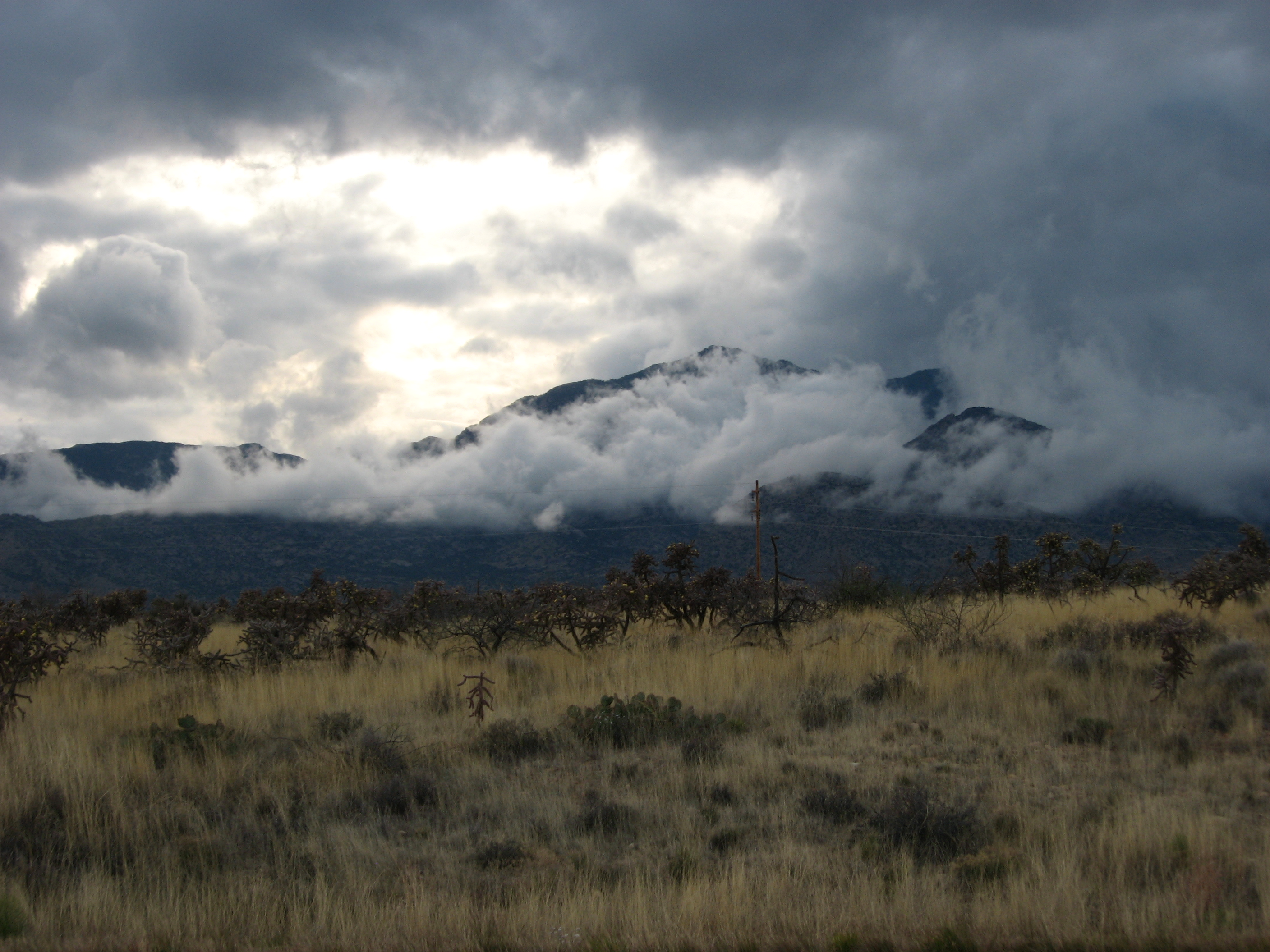
Mount Graham as seen from US 191 south of Safford

Northeast of Willcox, US 191 leaves I-10 at Exit 352 and heads north toward Safford, leaving Cochise County and entering Graham County along the way. Just north of I-10, US 191 passes through an intersection with Page Ranch Road, officially designated as US 191 Wye. This provides a shortcut for traveling between Bowie and Safford, as the mainline of US 191 is curved toward the west near I-10. Going toward Safford, the eastern terminus of two state routes intersect the route, namely SR 266, which provides access to Fort Grant, and SR 366 in Swift Trail Junction, which climbs up to the summit of Mount Graham and provides access to Mount Graham International Observatory. Arriving in Safford, US 191 turns east at an intersection with 5th Street (US 70), where a 10-mile (16-kilometre) concurrency with US 70 begins.

=== Safford to St. Johns ===
Traveling east from Safford, US 70/US 191 passes by the communities of Solomon and San Jose before US 191 turns northeast to split from US 70. The route crosses the Gila River, then heads toward Three Way, passing through the Black Hills and entering Greenlee County. At Three Way, US 191 turns to the north, but the intersection is the northern terminus of SR 75, which heads toward Duncan, and the western terminus of SR 78, which heads into New Mexico toward Mule Creek. Heading north, US 191 is a divided highway for about 5 miles (8.0 kilometres) until it arrives in Clifton, the start of the road's designation as the Coronado Trail Scenic Road (both an Arizona Scenic Route and a National Scenic Byway). This scenic road approximates the route Francisco Vázquez de Coronado took between 1540 and 1542. At the intersection with Zorrilla Street in Clifton, the US 191 designation temporarily ends and the road continues as US 191 Temporary through the Morenci mine.

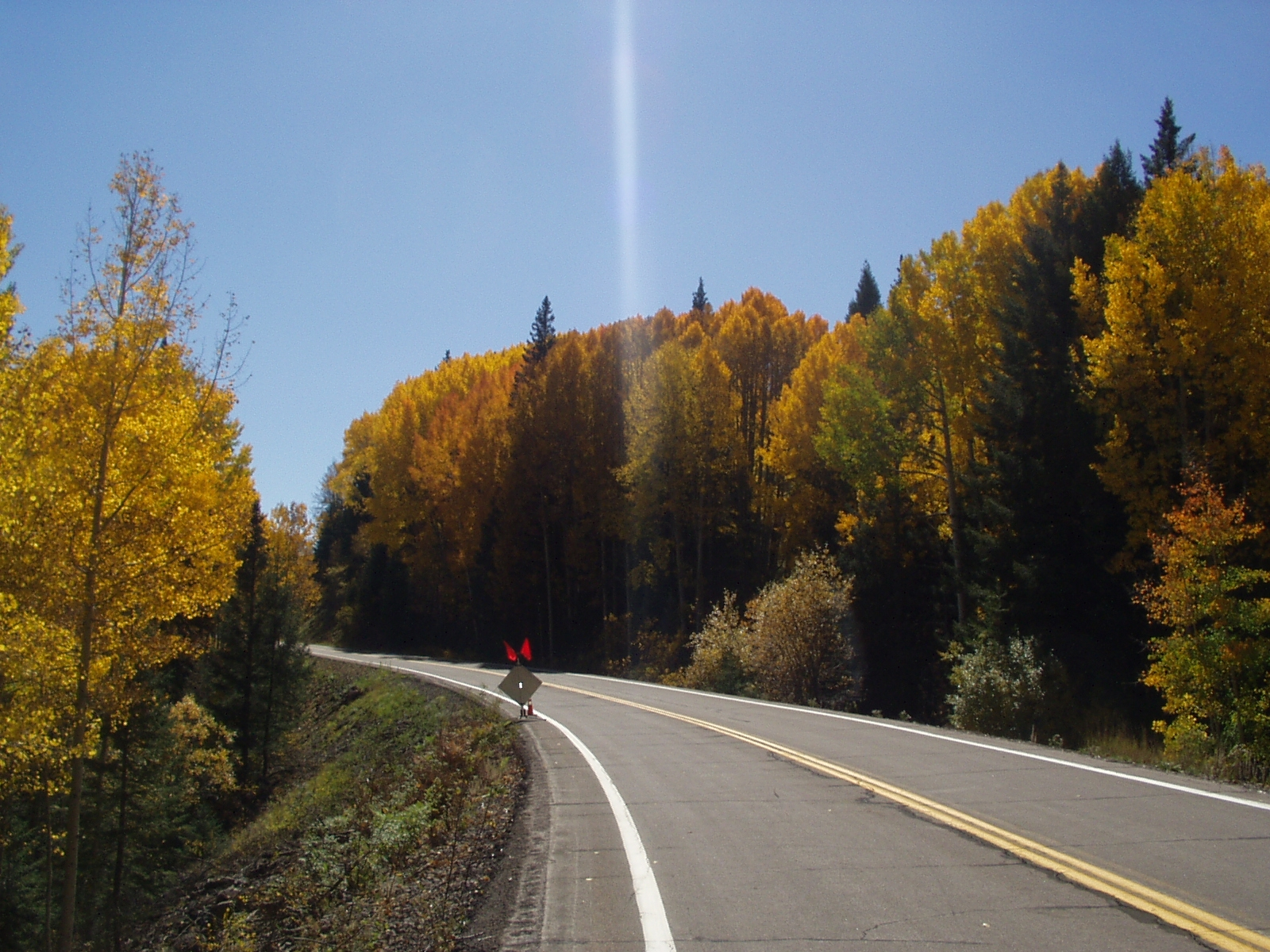
A section of the Coronado Trail Scenic Byway along US 191 between Clifton and Morenci

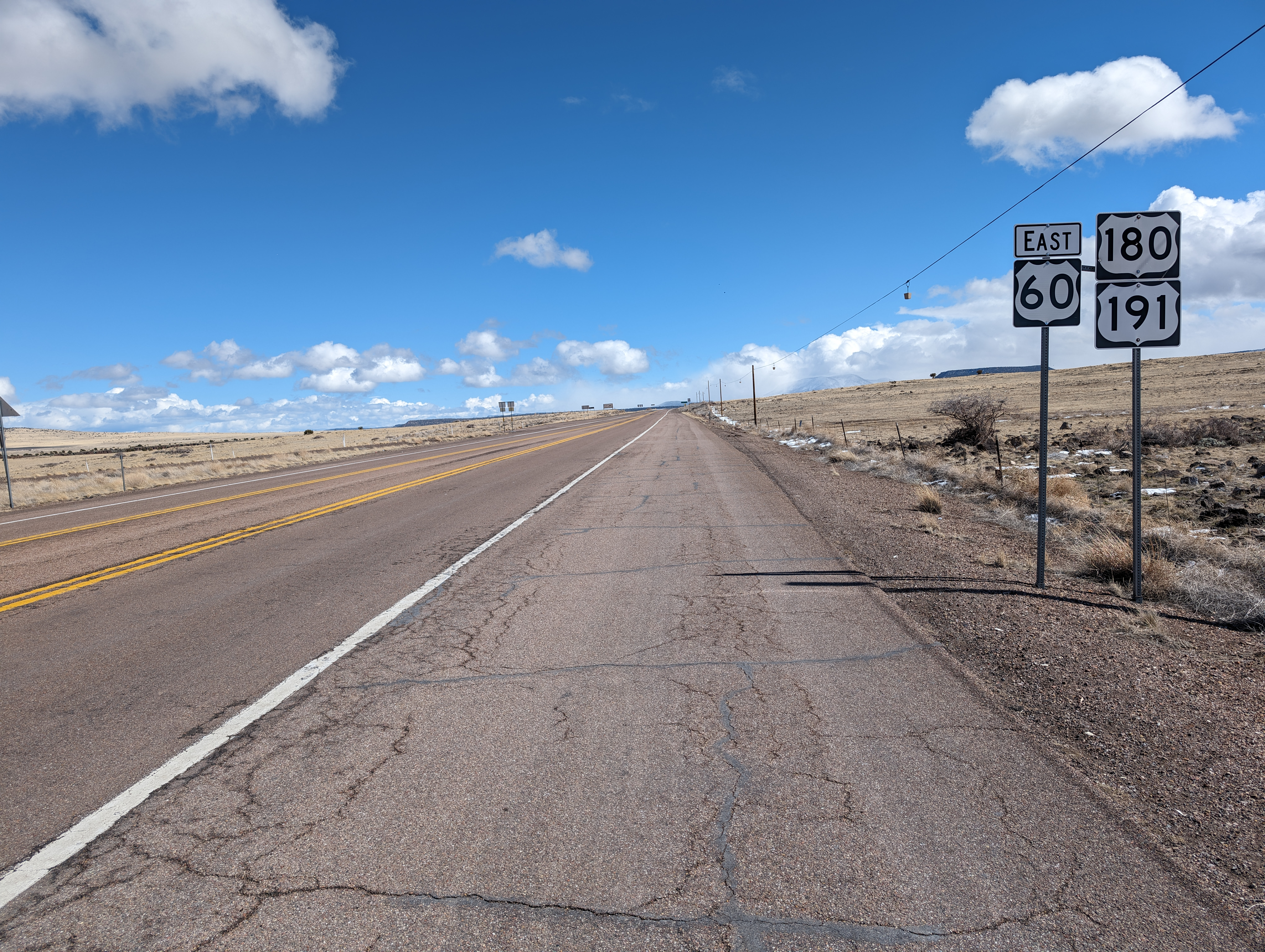
The triple concurrency of U.S. Routes 60, 180, and 191

At the northern end of the Morenci mine, the road reacquires its US 191 designation and travels through the Apache–Sitgreaves National Forest, in which it enters Apache County. The road through the forest is dangerous with no shoulders and many hairpin turns along steep mountainsides. The Hannagan Meadow Recreation Area is approximately 53 miles (85 kilometres) from the National Forest boundary. Tourists driving the Coronado Trail often use this spot as a turnaround point, rather than continue north along the route. Occasionally, endangered Mexican wolves have been spotted visiting the region around the recreation area. About 75 miles (121 kilometres) through the forest, US 191 arrives in Alpine and intersects US 180, where a 56-mile (90-kilometre) concurrency begins. Continuing through the forest, the road travels through the community of Nutrioso before leaving the Apache–Sitgreaves National Forest. Just after leaving the forest, US 180/US 191 turns north at a T-intersection, the eastern terminus of SR 260. About 2 miles (3.2 kilometres) to the northwest, US 180/US 191 enters Springerville and turns to the west at another T-intersection, this time with Main Street, where a triple concurrency between US 60, US 180, and US 191 begins. This triple concurrency passes through Springerville and ends about 3 miles (4.8 kilometres) northwest of Springerville, where US 180/US 191 turns north and the road continues west as US 60. The US 180/US 191 concurrency continues north for another 25 miles (40 kilometres), intersecting former SR 81, which leads to Lyman Lake State Park before arriving in St. Johns as White Mountain Drive.

=== St. Johns to Utah ===
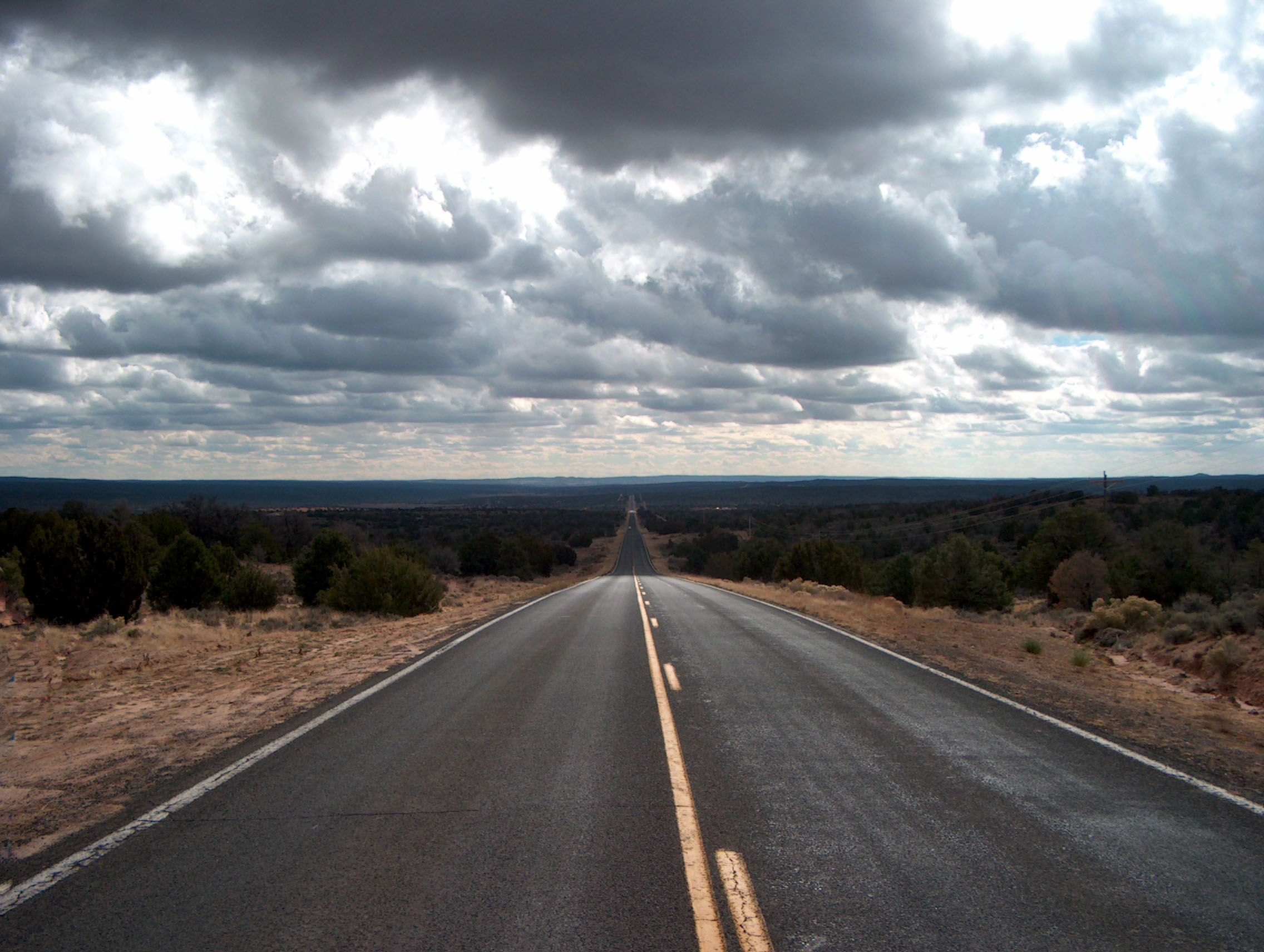
US 191 near Chinle in the Navajo Nation

In St. Johns, US 180/US 191 intersects Commercial Street (SR 61), where the US 180/US 191 concurrency ends but a concurrency with SR 61 begins. This concurrency leaves St. Johns and travels north for about 29 miles (47 kilometres) until SR 61 turns to the northeast and heads toward Zuni, New Mexico. Continuing north, US 191 immediately enters the Navajo Nation and then travels another 24 miles (39 kilometres) until it arrives at Interstate 40 in Sanders. Here, US 191 has a concurrency with I-40 for 6 miles (9.7 kilometres) from Exit 339 to Exit 333 in Chambers, where US 191 continues north through the Navajo Nation, intersecting BIA Route 28 in Klagetoh before its arrival in Ganado, where a 6-mile (9.7-kilometre) concurrency with SR 264 begins. From there, US /SR 264 heads west past Hubbell Trading Post National Historic Site and toward Burnside, where the concurrency ends at a roundabout junction with US 191, SR 264, and BIA Route 15.

At the roundabout, US 191 travels north to Chinle, where it intersects BIA Route 7, which provides access to Canyon de Chelly National Monument. Continuing north, the route intersects BIA Route 59 in Many Farms, BIA Route 12 in Round Rock, and BIA Route 35 in Rock Point, before arriving at a T-intersection with US 160 near Mexican Water. Here, US 191 shares the route with US 160 for about 2 miles (3.2 kilometres) until it turns to the north for its final 5 miles (8.0 kilometres) in Arizona, leaving the state at the Utah state line and entering San Juan County, heading toward Bluff.

== History ==
U.S. Route 191 (US 191) has existed since November 11, 1926. However, it did not enter Arizona at that time. US 191 didn't enter Arizona until June 15, 1981. The northern section of US 191 between Utah and Chambers was designated from two separate roads, one of which was already designated as State Route 63 (SR 63). The southern section wasn't designated as part of US 191 until June 1992, and was originally a section of U.S. Route 666 (US 666).

=== State Route 63 and BIA Route 12 ===
State Route 63
- Location: Apache County
- Length: 136.64 mi (219.90 km)
- Existed: 1961–1981

BIA Route 12
- Location: Navajo Nation
- Length: 5.11 mi (8.22 km)

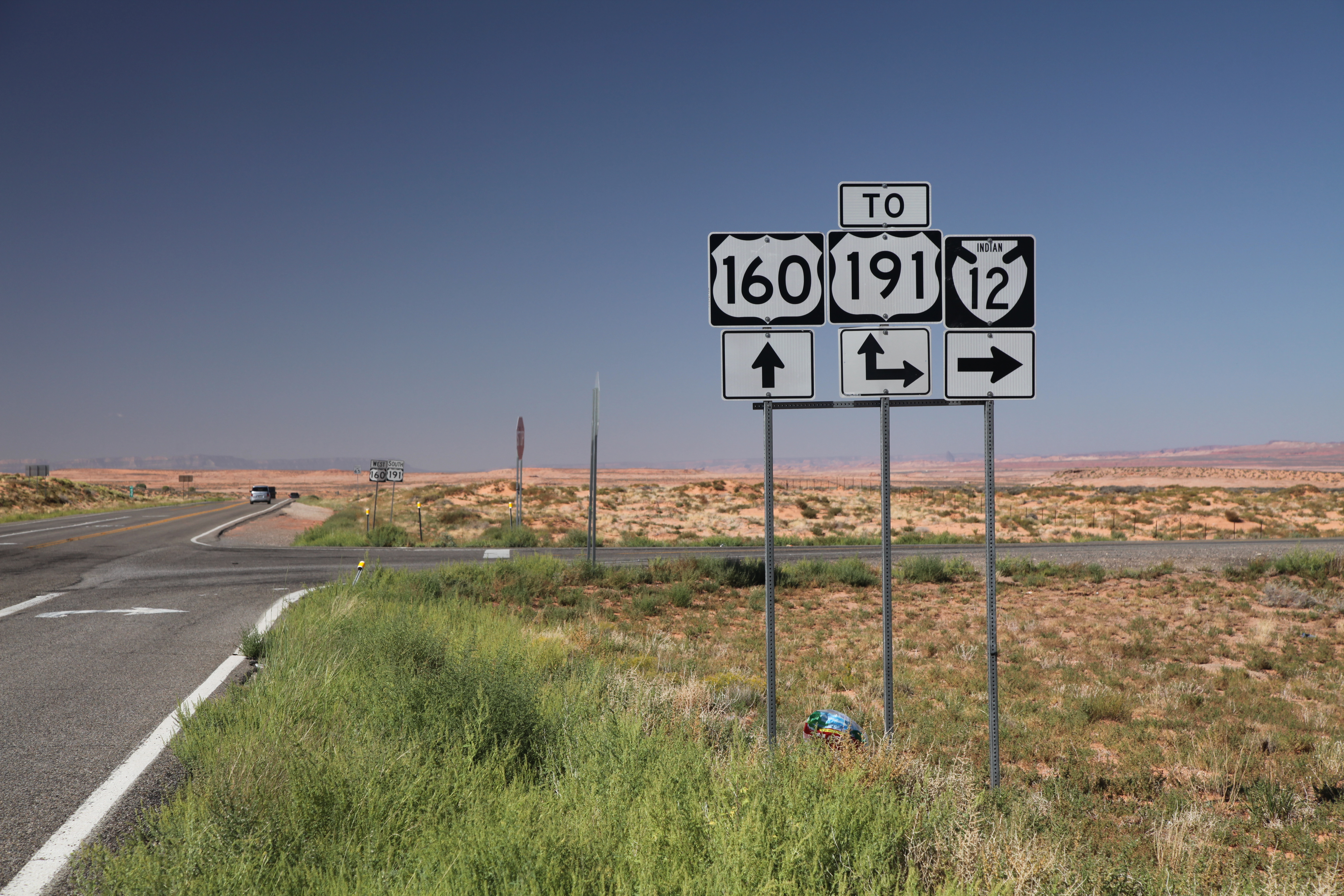
The southern terminus of BIA Route 12 at the junction of US 160 and US 191 near Mexican Water

A map of former SR 63 highlighted in red, and BIA 12 highlighted in blue

State Route 63 (SR 63) was the original highway designated between Chambers and US 160 near Mexican Water. The SR 63 designation had been previously used by a different route through Petrified Forest National Park, which was decommissioned and handed over to the National Park Service in 1951. The later SR 63 was commissioned by the Arizona State Highway Department on January 10, 1961. When it was originally designated, SR 63 only ran from I-40 in Chambers (which at the time was also part of US 66) to the Navajo Nation boundary north of Chambers.

On December 14, 1962, the route from the Navajo Nation boundary to SR 264 in Ganado, which was maintained by the Bureau of Indian Affairs (BIA) as BIA Route 8 (BIA 8), became part of SR 63. The route from SR 264 in Burnside to US 160 (which was then designated as US 164) was originally part of BIA 8 and BIA 17 respectively. On June 15, 1970, BIA 8 and BIA 17 were transferred to the state of Arizona and designated as an extension of SR 63. Between Ganado and Burnside, SR 63 ran concurrently with SR 264. By 1981, SR 63 had a total length of 136.64 miles (219.90 kilometres).

The section of highway extending from US 160 near Mexican Water to the Utah state line, entirely within the Navajo Nation, was designated only as part of BIA 12, which continued north into Utah. Both the entirety of SR 63 and BIA 12 were approved by the American Association of State Highway and Transportation Officials (AASHTO) as a southern extension of US 191 on June 25, 1981. This extended the national southern terminus of US 191 from US 287 near Yellowstone National Park in Wyoming, to I-40 in Chambers. This also created a concurrency between US 191 and US 160 between SR 63 and BIA 12. As a result of the extension, SR 63 was decommissioned in favor of US 191.

As of 2021, the section of US 191 between US 160 and the Utah state line is still designated as part of BIA 12 and is still maintained by the BIA, and not by the Arizona Department of Transportation (ADOT). BIA 12 has a total length of 5.11 miles (8.22 kilometres) between US 160 and the continuation of US 191 and BIA 12 at the Utah state line.

=== U.S. Route 666 ===
U.S. Route 666
- Devil's Highway
- Location: Douglas to the New Mexico state line in Lupton
- Length: 373.37 mi (600.88 km)
- Existed: 1938–1992

A map of former US 666, highlighted in red

U.S. Route 666 (US 666) was the original U.S. Highway designation between Douglas and Sanders. It was also an auxiliary route of US 66, from which US 666 derived its number. What would become US 666 was originally designated on September 9, 1927 as State Route 81 (SR 81) between US 80 in Douglas and US 180 in Safford. SR 71 was designated on the route between US 180 near Solomonsville and Clifton. Two further parts of the Douglas to Sanders route were sections of US 180 between Safford and Solomonsville and US 70 between Springerville and St. Johns. The remainder of the route between Douglas and Sanders was not part of the state highway system.

Undesignated parts of the Douglas to Sanders corridor were being added the state highway system beginning in 1928 when SR 71 was extended north from Clifton to US 70 near Springerville. On September 27, 1933, half of the route between St. Johns and Sanders was designated as part of SR 61. By 1936, SR 81 was designated over the entire route between US 80 in Douglas and US 66 in Sanders, with SR 71 being decommissioned. This established concurrencies with US 70 (which now took the former route of US 180), US 260 (which had taken over the original route of US 70) and SR 61.

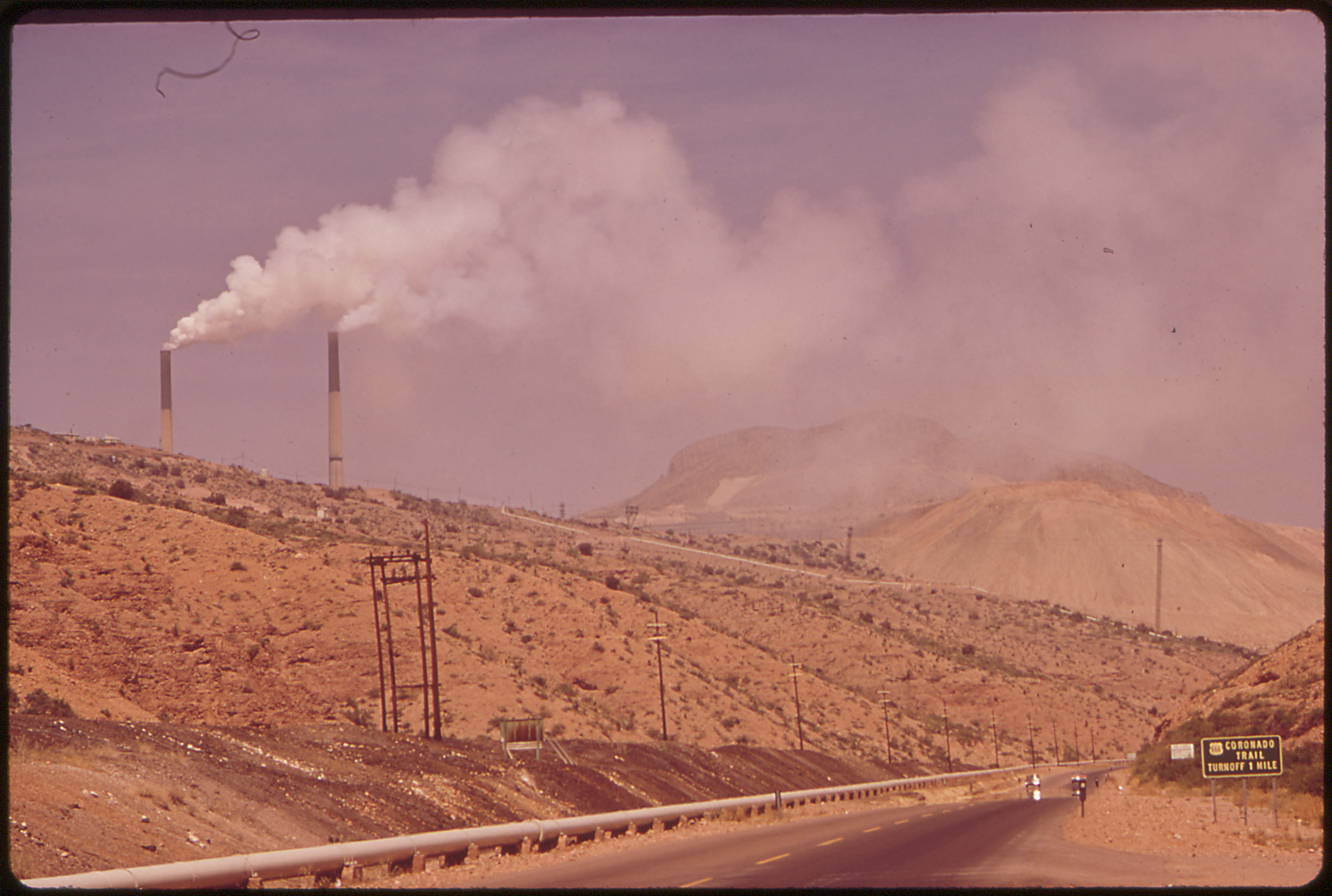
US 666 in front of the Phelps Dodge smelter in Morenci, June 1972.

Beginning in 1934, the Arizona State Highway Department petitioned the American Association of State Highway Officials (AASHO) to make the Douglas to Sanders corridor a southern extension of US 666. On December 4, 1938, AASHO approved an extension of US 666 from what was then its southern terminus in Gallup, New Mexico to Douglas, replacing the entirety of SR 81. Between Gallup and Sanders, US 666 was concurrent with US 66, entering Arizona at Lupton.

US 666 shields used in Arizona during the mid-1950s

On November 7, 1974, the section of US 666 through the Morenci mine was redesignated as a temporary route, becoming US 666T. The intent was to construct a new section of US 666 around the mine to replace the old section. As of 2021, the proposed route hasn't been constructed but remains in planning. By 1988, the total length of US 666 in Arizona between Douglas and New Mexico was 373.37 miles (600.88 kilometres), not including US 666T.

Due to the highway's numeric designation being similar to the "number of the beast" (which was the number 666) from the Book of Revelation in the Bible, US 666 gained the nickname, the "Devil's Highway", and in turn became associated with the biblical devil. The number was never meant to be an association to the Bible or its passages, as the number chosen for US 666 was meant to denote it was the sixth branch route of US 66. All designations between US 166 and US 566 were already planned or were in use by other highways.

However, the biblical association and constant theft of US 666 navigational markers, prompted the state of Arizona to renumber the highway. AASHTO approved a request from the states of Arizona and New Mexico to re-designate US 666 in June 1992. As a result, US 666 was truncated to its original southern terminus in Gallup, while US 191 was extended south along former US 666 between Sanders and Douglas. US 191 became concurrent with I-40 between Chambers and Sanders. The redesignation was officially implemented by the Arizona Department of Transportation on September 18, 1992. The remainder of US 666 north of Gallup was redesignated US 491 in 2003.

== Major intersections ==
County	Location	mi	km	Exit	Destinations	Notes
Cochise	Pirtleville	0.00– 0.01	0.00– 0.016		SR 80 (Historic US 80) – Douglas, Bisbee	Southern terminus; former US 80; southern terminus of former US 666
Cochise	Sunizona	38.17	61.43		SR 181 east – Chiricahua National Park	
Cochise		66.65	107.26		I-10 west – Tucson	Southern end of I-10 concurrency; I-10 exit 331
Cochise		71.93	115.76	336	BL 10 east / Taylor Road – Chiricahua National Park	Exit numbers follow I-10
Cochise	Willcox	75.57	121.62	340	SR 186 east (Rex Allen Drive) / Fort Grant Road	Exit numbers follow I-10
Cochise		79.43	127.83	344	BL 10 west / Old Stewart Road	Exit numbers follow I-10
Cochise		87.58	140.95		I-10 east – El Paso	Northern end of I-10 concurrency; I-10 exit 352
Cochise		90.13	145.05		Page Ranch Road (US 191Y south) – Bowie	
Graham		104.51	168.19		SR 266 west (Fort Grant Road) – Fort Grant	
Graham	Swift Trail Junction	113.83	183.19		SR 366 west (Swift Trail) – Mt. Graham	
Graham	Safford	121.17	195.00		US 70 west (5th Street) – Thatcher	Southern end of US 70 concurrency
Graham		131.23	211.19		US 70 east – Duncan	Northern end of US 70 concurrency
Greenlee	Three Way	154.91	249.30		SR 75 south / SR 78 east – Mule Creek, Duncan	Northern terminus of SR 75; western terminus of SR 78
Greenlee	Clifton	164.35	264.50		Zorilla Street	US 191 transitions to US 191T
Greenlee		178.58	287.40		US 191T transitions back to US 191	
Apache	Alpine	257.63	414.62		US 180 east – Luna	Southern end of US 180 concurrency
Apache	Eagar	282.00	453.84		SR 260 west (Central Avenue) – Eagar	Eastern terminus of SR 260
Apache	Springerville	283.67	456.52		US 60 east (Main Street east) – Quemado	Southern end of US 60 concurrency
Apache	Springerville	284.57	457.97		Mountain Avenue to SR 260 – Eagar	Serves White Mountain Regional Medical Center; former SR 260 Spur west
Apache	Springerville	287.95	463.41		US 60 west – Show Low	Northern end of US 60 concurrency
Apache	St. Johns	313.38	504.34		US 180 west / SR 61 south (Commercial Street west) – Show Low	Northern end of US 180 concurrency; southern end of SR 61 concurrency
Apache		342.46	551.14		SR 61 north – Zuni	Northern end of SR 61 concurrency
Apache	Sanders	366.37	589.62		I-40 east – Albuquerque	Southern end of I-40 concurrency; I-40 exit 339; former US 66 east / US 666 north
Apache	Chambers	372.49	599.46		I-40 west – Flagstaff	Northern end of I-40 concurrency; I-40 exit 333; former US 66 west; southern terminus of former SR 63
Apache	Ganado	410.31	660.33		SR 264 east – Window Rock	Southern end of SR 264 concurrency
Apache	Burnside	416.20	669.81		SR 264 west / BIA Route 15 west – Tuba City, Dilkon, Keams Canyon	Roundabout; northern end of SR 264 concurrency; eastern terminus of BIA Rte. 15
Apache	Mexican Water	509.10	819.32		US 160 west – Kayenta	Southern end of US 160 concurrency; northern terminus of former SR 63
Apache	Mexican Water	511.39	823.00		US 160 east / BIA Route 12 begins – Four Corners	Northern end of US 160 concurrency; southern end of BIA 12 concurrency; southern terminus of BIA 12
Apache	Mexican Water	511.39	823.00		North end of state maintenance	
Arizona–Utah line		516.50	831.23		US 191 north / BIA Route 12 ends – Bluff	Continuation into Utah; northern end of BIA 12 concurrency; northern terminus of BIA 12
1.000 mi = 1.609 km; 1.000 km = 0.621 mi: Concurrency terminus; Route transition

== Special routes ==
US 191 has three special routes within the state of Arizona.

=== Douglas business route ===
U.S. Route 191 Business
- Pan American Avenue
- Location: Douglas
- Length: 1.15 mi (1.85 km)
- Existed: 1992–present

A map of the Douglas business route. The route is highlighted in red.

U.S. Business Route 191 (US 191 Bus.) is a business spur of US 191 located entirely within the city of Douglas, Arizona. US 191 Bus. is 1.15 miles (1.85 km) long and acts as the main route into Agua Prieta in Mexico via the Douglas Port of Entry at the Mexico–United States border. Despite being a special route of US 191, US 191 Bus. never intersects with its implied parent route and instead ends at Arizona State Route 80 (SR 80) and Historic US 80 approximately 1.5 miles (2.4 km) east of the US 191 southern terminus. The route was originally designated as US 666 Bus. on May 4, 1962. US 666 Bus. was redesignated as US 191 Bus. in 1992, when US 666 and all its related routes in Arizona were renumbered to extensions and special routes of US 191.

US 191 Bus. begins at the Douglas port of entry. Heading northeast, US 191 takes on the name Pan American Avenue. The route is lined with several businesses and acts as the western boundary to downtown Douglas. Several large slag piles can be seen from US 191 to the west at the former location of the Douglas smelter. A number of warehouses and industrial structures are also located west of the highway. US 191 Bus. curves slightly in front of the Douglas Police Station (former train station) before terminating at an intersection with SR 80 and Historic US 80 16th Street and G Avenue. Westbound SR 80 provides a direct connection to US 191, which begins just over a mile west of town.

Major intersections

The entire route is in Douglas, Cochise County.

mi	km	Destinations	Notes
0.00	0.00	Raul H. Castro Port of Entry	United States–Mexico border; road continues into Mexico as Avenida 3 (Panamericana), enters from Mexico as Calle Internacional
1.15	1.85	SR 80 / Historic US 80 to US 191 north	Northern terminus; highway continues east as SR 80 (Pan American Avenue north)
1.000 mi = 1.609 km; 1.000 km = 0.621 mi

=== Cochise County wye route ===
U.S. Route 191 Wye
- Page Ranch Road
- Location: Cochise County
- Length: 3.51 mi (5.65 km)
- Existed: 1992–present

A map of the unsigned "Wye" route. The route is highlighted in red.

U.S. Route 191 Wye (US 191Y) is an unsigned auxiliary route of US 191 that runs from exit 355 of I-10 to US 191; it is also known as Page Ranch Road. It is a shortcut for traffic traveling from westbound on I-10 to northbound on US 191 and from southbound on US 191 to eastbound on I-10. The route was originally part of US 666. By 1951, US 666 was moved to a newer alignment, further to the west. The old route between present-day exit 355 (which was at the time a regular intersection with SR 86) and the new alignment of US 666 was designated on January 24, 1958 as US 666 Wye (US 666Y). US 666Y was redesignated as US 191Y on September 18, 1992, when US 666 and all of its special routes were redesignated as US 191 and special routes of US 191.

Major intersections

The entire route is in Cochise County.

Location	mi	km	Destinations	Notes
Luzena	0.00	0.00	I-10 – Safford, El Paso	Southern terminus; I-10 exit 355; road continues as Page Ranch Road
	3.51	5.65	US 191 – Safford, Willcox	Northern terminus
1.000 mi = 1.609 km; 1.000 km = 0.621 mi

=== Morenci mine temporary route ===
U.S. Route 191T
- Location: Morenci mine
- Length: 14.22 mi (22.88 km)
- Existed: 1992–present

A map of the Morenci mine temporary route. The route is highlighted in red.

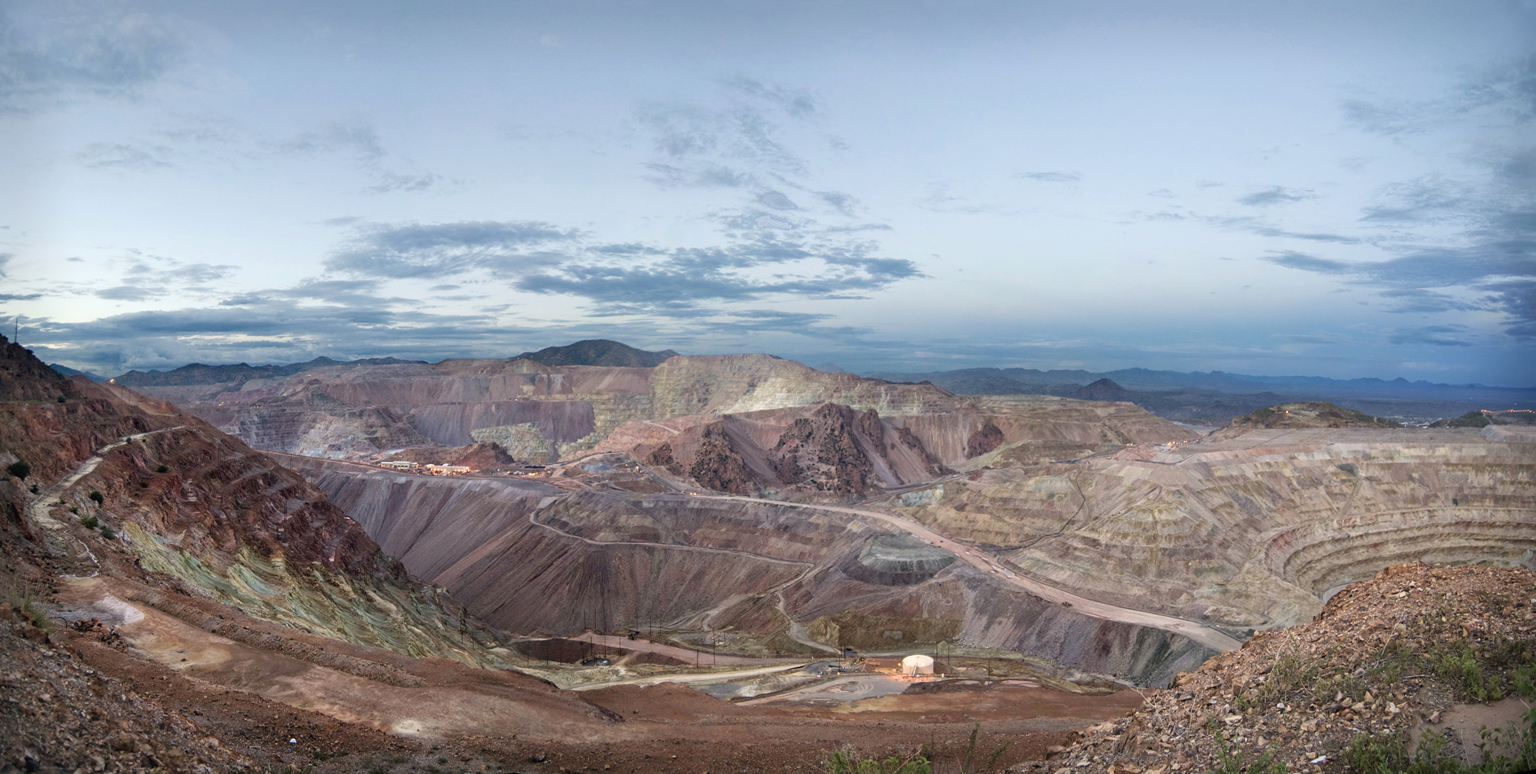
Morenci mine, as seen from US 191T

U.S. Route 191 Temporary (US 191 Temp. or US 191T) is the designation of 14.22 miles (22.88 km) of the route of US 191 through the Morenci mine. The route was originally designated as US 666 Temporary (US 666T) on November 7, 1974, being a redesignated section of US 666 proper, creating a gap in the latter route. This was done in anticipation of a new alignment for US 666, bypassing the mine. In 1992, US 666T was redesignated as US 191T, when US 666 and all its related routes in Arizona were renumbered to extensions and special routes of US 191. As of 2021, the proposed bypass has yet to be constructed.

US 191 Temp. begins at an intersection with Zorilla Street in Clifton, on the west bank of the San Francisco River. Heading west, US 191 Temp. travels through Clifton's Chase Creek District before ascending the side of the Chase Creek Valley. The road then turns around at the end of the valley with a hairpin turn, where the original routing of the road (then US 666) can be seen leaving the current roadway and heading toward the mine. The road continues to ascend the valley in a southern direction until it arrives in Morenci. Here, the route turns north at the intersection of Burro Alley and Coronado Trail. Originally, the route traveled straight at this intersection and went through Morenci, but a bypass was built in 1972. After leaving Morenci, the road passes through the Morenci mine, where it travels through three short tunnels in total. After its exit from the mine, the US 191 Temp. designation ends and the road continues as US 191 toward Alpine.

Major intersections

The entire route is in Greenlee County.

Location	mi	km	Destinations	Notes
Clifton	163.95	263.85	US 191 south / Zorilla Street	Southern terminus; highway continues as US 191 south
	179.36 173.00	288.65 278.42	US 191 north	Continuation beyond northern terminus
1.000 mi = 1.609 km; 1.000 km = 0.621 mi: Route transition

U.S. Route 191
Previous state: Terminus	Arizona	Next state: Utah

U.S. Route 666
Previous state: Terminus	Arizona	Next state: New Mexico
