= Arizona State Route 180A =

State highway

State Route 180A
- SR 180A highlighted in red

Route information
- Maintained by ADOT
- Length: 11.18 mi (17.99 km)
- Existed: 1974–present

Major junctions
- West end: US 180 north of Concho
- East end: SR 61 in Concho

Location
- Country: United States
- State: Arizona

Highway system
- Arizona State Highway System; Interstate; US; State; Scenic Proposed; Former
← US 180	→ SR 181

State Route 180A (SR 180A) is a highway in Apache County, Arizona, that runs from its junction with US 180 to SR 61 west of St. Johns. It is an east–west route for the entirety of its 10-mile (16 km) length, though its true direction is more north–south.

== Route description ==
SR 180A follows the original alignment of US 180 before the more direct route from St. Johns to its current junction with SR 180A was built. It heads southeasterly from its western terminus at a junction with US 180 northwest of St. Johns. The eastern terminus of the highway is located at a junction with SR 61 near the community of Concho. SR 180A now serves as a bypass route for eastbound traffic wishing to avoid St. Johns. SR 180A has no junctions with any highways aside from its endpoints.

== History ==
The route was established by the Arizona Department of Transportation in 1974. Since then, the route remains as defined.

== Junction list ==
The entire route is in Apache County.

Location	mi	km	Destinations	Notes
	11.18	17.99	US 180 – Holbrook, St. Johns	Western terminus
Concho	0.00	0.00	SR 61 – St. Johns, Show Low	Eastern terminus
1.000 mi = 1.609 km; 1.000 km = 0.621 mi
