= Arizona State Route 75 =

Highway in Arizona

State Route 75
- SR 75 highlighted in red

Route information
- Maintained by ADOT
- Length: 19.39 mi (31.21 km)
- Existed: 1932–present

Major junctions
- South end: US 70 in Duncan
- North end: US 191 / SR 78

Location
- Country: United States
- State: Arizona

Highway system
- Arizona State Highway System; Interstate; US; State; Scenic Proposed; Former
← SR 74	→ SR 76

Arizona State Route 75, abbreviated as SR 75, is a state highway in eastern Arizona that stretches from its junction with U.S. Route 191 and State Route 78 near Greenlee County Airport south to its junction with U.S. Route 70 in Duncan. It is primarily a shortcut for north and southbound traffic between Duncan and Clifton.

== Route description ==
The southern terminus of SR 75 is located at a junction with U.S. Route 70 in Duncan. It initially heads northeast from this intersection but curves back towards the northwest. As it continues towards the northwest, the highway passes through the communities of Sheldon, Apache Grove and York. The northern terminus of SR 75 is located at a junction with U.S. Route 191 and SR 78 in Three Way near the Greenlee County Airport.

== History ==
SR 75 was designated as a state highway between Duncan and Clifton in 1932. In 1935, the route was solely a gravel road, but by 1938, the southern half had been paved. However, the northern half remained a gravel road. The highway was shortened to its present northern terminus when U.S. Route 666 (now U.S. Route 191) was relocated to an alignment further south. The section north of the new junction with U.S. Route 666 was transferred into Route 666.

== Junction list ==
The entire route is in Greenlee County.

Location	mi	km	Destinations	Notes
Duncan	0.00	0.00	US 70 (Railroad Avenue) – Safford, Lordsburg	Southern terminus; road continues southwest as Main Street
Duncan			Virden Highway - Virden	To NM 92
Three Way	19.39	31.21	US 191 / SR 78 east – Clifton, Safford, Mule Creek	Northern terminus; US 191 is former US 666; road continues as US 191 north
1.000 mi = 1.609 km; 1.000 km = 0.621 mi
