= New Mexico State Road 211 =

State highway in Grant County, New Mexico, United States

State Road 211

Route information
- Maintained by NMDOT
- Length: 6.447 mi (10.375 km)

Major junctions
- South end: US 180 south of Gila
- NM 153 in Gila; NM 293 in Cliff
- North end: US 180 in Cliff

Location
- Country: United States
- State: New Mexico
- Counties: Grant

Highway system
- New Mexico State Highway System; Interstate; US; State; Scenic
← NM 210	→ NM 212

State Road 211 (NM 211) is a 6.447-mile (10.375 km) state highway in Grant County, New Mexico, United States, that forms a northeastern loop off of U.S. Route 180 (US 180), beginning south of Gila and ending in Cliff.

== Route description ==
NM 211 begins at a T intersection with US 180 south of the census-designated place (CDP) of Gila. (US 180 heads east toward Silver City and Deming and west toward Cliff and the northern terminus of NM 211.) From its southern terminus NM 211 proceeds northerly for just over 4 miles (6.4 km) to a Y intersection the southern end of New Mexico State Road 153 (NM 153 / Turkey Creek Road) in in the central part of Gila. (NM 153 heads north-northeast for nearly four miles [6.4 km] before state maintenance ends north of Gila.) NM 211 then proceeds west-northwesterly to cross the Gila River, leave Gila, and enter the CDP of Cliff.

Just over one-half mile (0.80 km) after entering Cliff, NM 211 reaches the southern end of New Mexico State Road 292 (NM 292 / Box Canyon Road) at a T intersection. (NM 292 heads north-northeast for five and a half miles [8.9 km] before state maintenance ends north of Cliff.) NM 211 then proceeds west-southwesterly to its western terminus at a T intersection with US 180 in the central part of Cliff. (US 180 heads east toward the southern terminus of NM 211 and west toward Glenwood and Springerville in Arizona.)

== Major intersections ==
The entire route is in Grant County.

Location	mi	km	Destinations	Notes
	0.000	0.000	US 180 east – Silver City, Deming US 180 west – Cliff, SR 211	Southern terminus;T intersection
Gila	4.200	6.759	NM 153 north (Turkey Creek Rd)	South end of NM 153; Y intersection
Gila			Bridge over the Gila River	
Cliff	5.500	8.851	NM 293 north (Box Canyon Rd)	South end of NM 293; T intersection
Cliff	6.447	10.375	US 180 east – SR 211 US 180 west – Glenwood, Springerville (Arizona)	Northern terminus; T intersection
1.000 mi = 1.609 km; 1.000 km = 0.621 mi

== See also ==
- List of state highways in New Mexico
