= Bonita, Arizona =

Unincorporated community in Graham County, Arizona, United States

- Unincorporated community
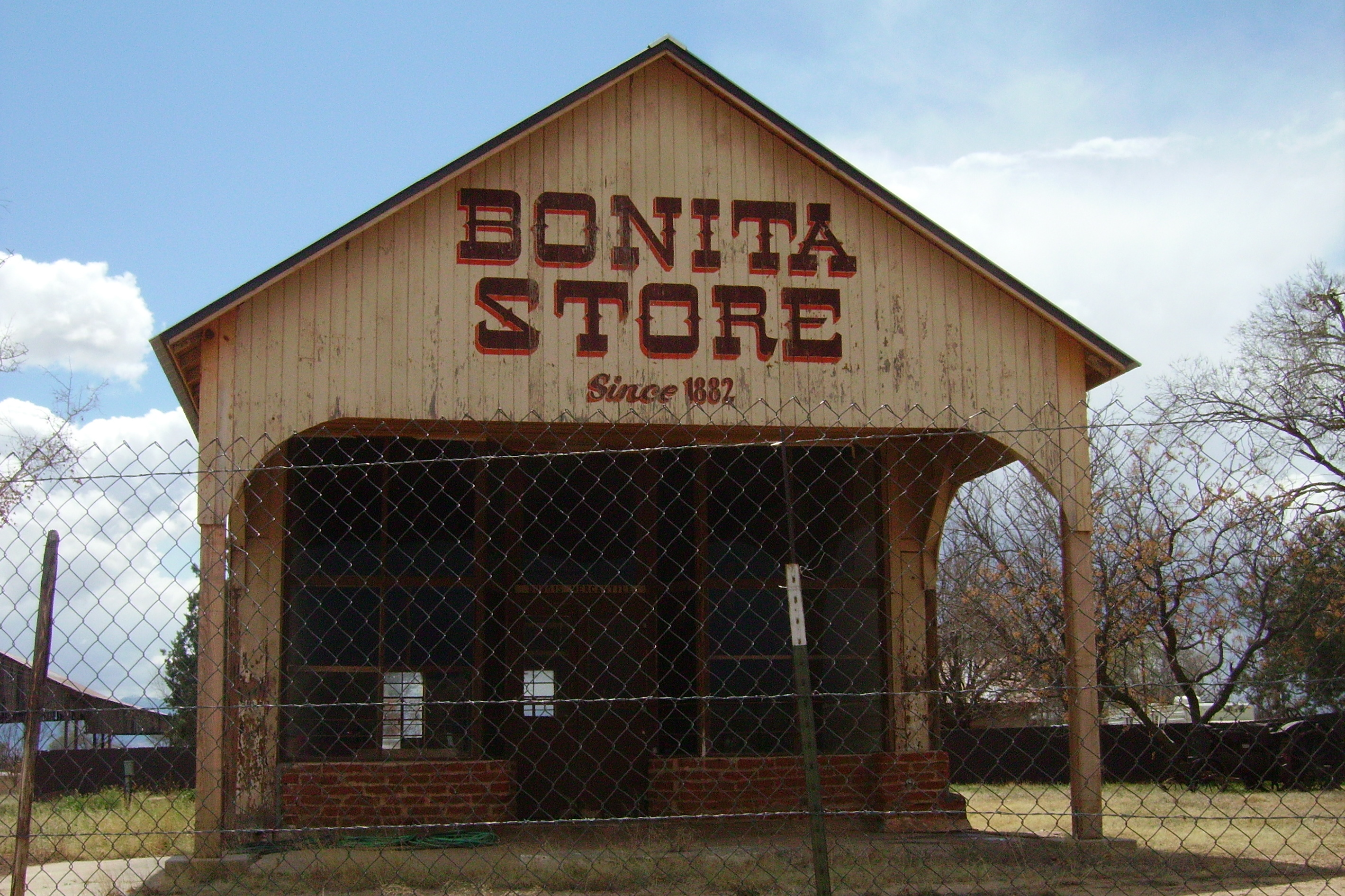
- The Bonita Store in Bonita, formerly a saloon where Henry McCarty, aka Billy The Kid shot and killed Francis P. Cahill (a local blacksmith) for assaulting and bullying him on August 17, 1877.

- Location within Arizona Location within the United States
- Coordinates: 32°35′23″N 109°58′09″W
- Country: United States
- State: Arizona
- County: Graham
- Elevation: 4,544 ft (1,385 m)
- Time zone: UTC-7 (Mountain (MST))
- Area code: 928
- GNIS feature ID: 24330

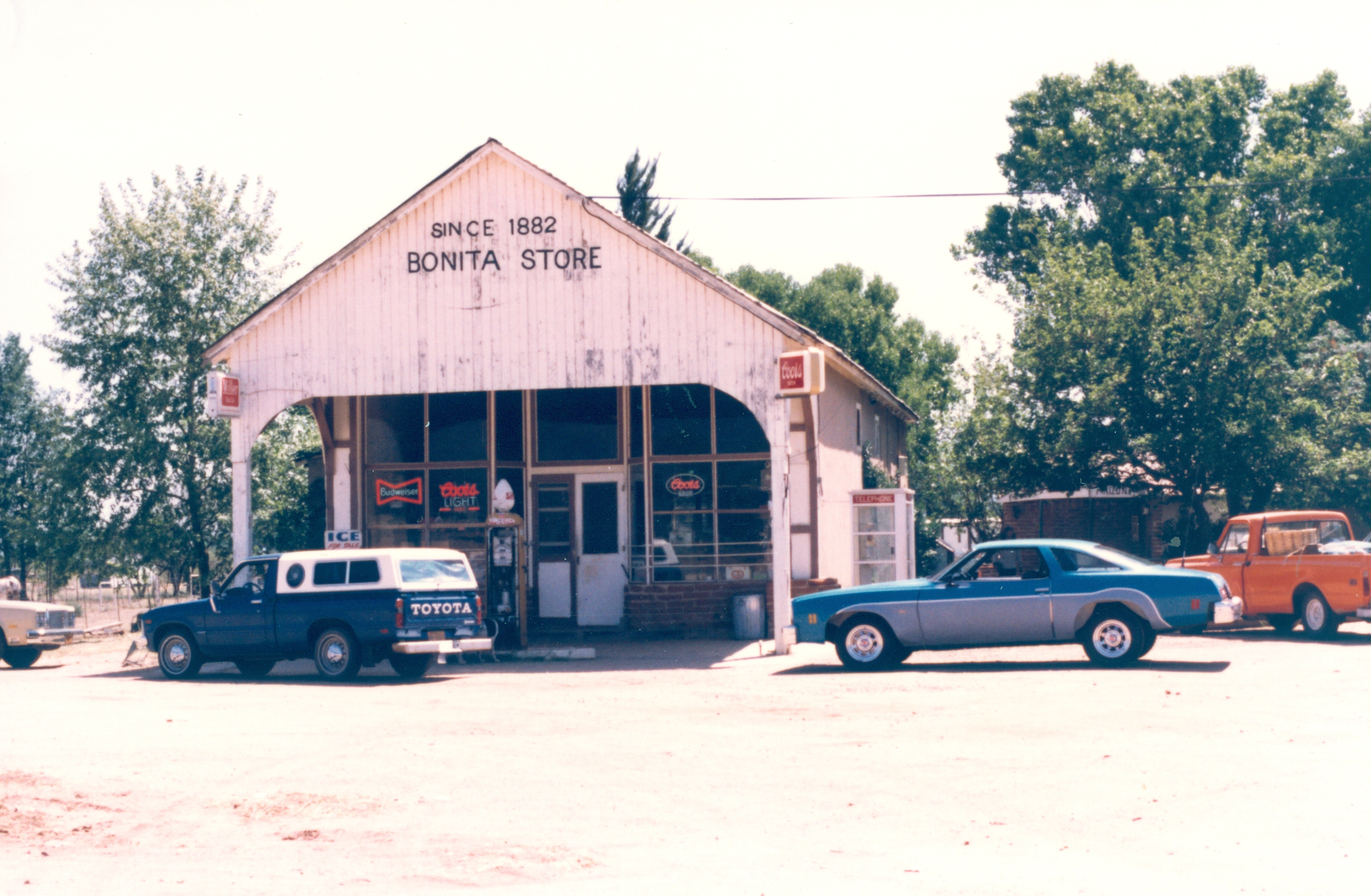
Bonita Store, May 2023

Bonita is an unincorporated community in Graham County, Arizona, United States. Bonita is located at the west end of Arizona State Route 266, 2.6 miles (4.2 km) south-southwest of Fort Grant and 22.7 miles (36.5 km) southwest of Safford.
