= L.C. Ranch Headquarters =

- L. C. Ranch Headquarters
- U.S. National Register of Historic Places
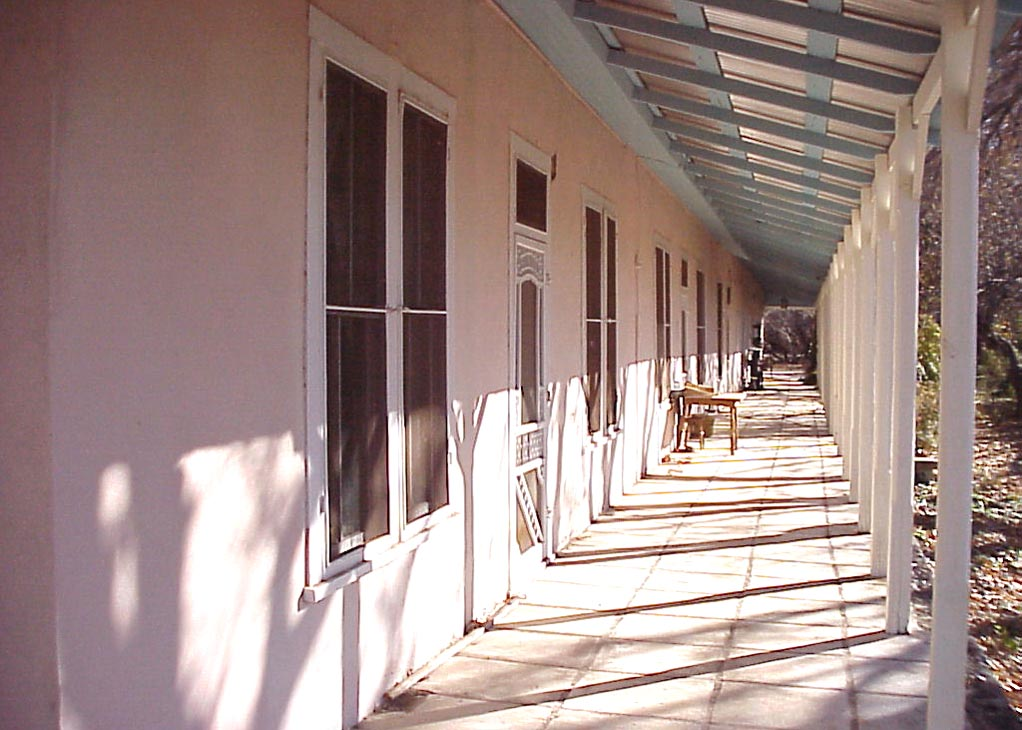

- Location within New Mexico
- Location: New Mexico State Road 211, off U.S. Route 260, Gila, New Mexico
- Coordinates: 32°57′52″N 108°34′50″W
- Area: 5 acres (2.0 ha)
- Built: c.1848, 1890
- Built by: Lyons, Tom
- Architectural style: Victorian
- NRHP reference No.: 78001816
- Added to NRHP: December 6, 1978

The L. C. Ranch Headquarters, in Gila, New Mexico, was built mostly in 1890 and was listed on the National Register of Historic Places in 1978.

It is located by the Gila River, on New Mexico State Road 211, about a mile east of its intersection with U.S. Route 260.

It is an E-shaped adobe building, created from expanding what is believed to be a U-shaped old Spanish estancia built in 1848. The expansion added 15 rooms, and used adobe bricks that are believed to have been taken from the nearby, abandoned Fort West. It included a trapdoor under the bed in Tom Lyons' bedroom, supposed to provide a safe place for him. He was threatened by struggles over open range, water rights, and sod-busters, and in fact was shot and killed in 1917 in El Paso, Texas.
