= New Mexico State Road 153 =

State highway in Grant County, New Mexico, United States

State Road 153
- Turkey Creek Road
- NM 153 highlighted in red

Route information
- Maintained by NMDOT
- Length: 3.752 mi (6.038 km)

Major junctions
- South end: NM 211 in Gila
- North end: End of state maintenance north of Gila

Location
- Country: United States
- State: New Mexico
- Counties: Grant

Highway system
- New Mexico State Highway System; Interstate; US; State; Scenic
← NM 152	→ NM 154

State Road 153 (NM 153), also known as Turkey Creek Road, is a 3.752-mile (6.038 km) state highway in Grant County, New Mexico, United States, that heads north-northeast from New Mexico State Road 211 (NM 211) in Gila.

== Route description ==
NM 153 begins at a Y intersection with NM 211 in the central part of the census-designated place of Gila. (Northbound NM 211 heads west to end at U.S. Route 180 [US 180] in Cliff. NM 211 heads south to end at US 180.) From its southern terminus NM 153 proceeds northeasterly (leaving Gila) for almost four miles (6.4 km) until it reaches its northern terminus at the end of state maintenance and the asphalt pavement. (Turkey Creek Road continues north as a gravel road for roughly 11 miles [18 km] before fording the Gila River and ending shortly thereafter.)

NM 153 runs southeast of and roughly parallel to the Gila River. (New Mexico State Road 292 [Box Canyon Road] follows a similar route northeasterly from NM 211 in Cliff for nearly 5 miles [8.0 km] and roughly parallel to the Gila River, but on the northwestern side of the river.)

== Major intersections ==
The entire route is in Grant County.

Location	mi	km	Destinations	Notes
Gila	0.000	0.000	NM 211 north – Cliff, US 180 NM 211 south – US 180	Southern terminus; Y intersection
	3.752	6.038	End of state maintenance	Northern terminus
	3.752	6.038	Turkey Creek Rd north	Continuation north from northern terminus; gravel road
1.000 mi = 1.609 km; 1.000 km = 0.621 mi: Route transition

== See also ==
- List of state highways in New Mexico
