= Franklin, Arizona =

CDP in Greenlee County, Arizona

- Census-designated place
- Location of Franklin in Greenlee County, Arizona.

- Location within Arizona Location within the United States
- Coordinates: 32°40′37″N 109°04′19″W
- Country: United States
- State: Arizona
- County: Greenlee

Area
  - Total: 1.00 sq mi (2.59 km^{2})
  - Land: 1.00 sq mi (2.59 km^{2})
  - Water: 0 sq mi (0.00 km^{2})
- Elevation: 3,730 ft (1,140 m)

Population (2020)
  - Total: 75
  - Density: 75/sq mi (28.9/km^{2})
- Time zone: UTC-7 (MST (no DST))
- ZIP code: 85534
- Area code: 928
- GNIS feature ID: 2582787

Franklin is an unincorporated community and census-designated place in Greenlee County, Arizona, United States. As of the 2020 census, it had a population of 75. It is located in southern Greenlee County along U.S. Route 70, 3 miles (4.8 km) west of the border with New Mexico, 3 miles (4.8 km) south of Duncan, and 32 miles (51 km) south of Clifton. Residents of Franklin are zoned to Duncan Unified School District, such as the nearby community of York as well as Virden, New Mexico. Many residents work for the Morenci Mine, owned by Freeport-McMoRan in Morenci.

== Demographics ==
Historical population
Census	Pop.	Note	%±
2020	75		—
U.S. Decennial Census
