= Concho Elementary School District =

School district in Arizona, United States

Address
- 6 Cinder Drive Concho, Arizona, 85924; United States

District information
- Type: Public
- Grades: PreK–8
- NCES District ID: 0402190

Students and staff
- Students: 176
- Teachers: 12.8
- Staff: 28.7
- Student–teacher ratio: 13.75

Other information
- Website: www.conchoschool.net

Concho Elementary School District No. 6 is a K-8 school district located in Concho, unincorporated Apache County, Arizona.

Its only school is Concho Elementary School. It is a PS through 8th grade school, and students may then attend one of three high schools, Show Low, Blue Ridge, or St Johns High School. Concho Elementary School has been in existence for over 100 years.

From 2020 to 2021 the number of students in the district increased by 3%.
