= Arizona State Route 266 =

State highway in Arizona, United States

State Route 266

Route information
- Maintained by ADOT
- Length: 19.18 mi (30.87 km)
- Existed: 1957–present

Major junctions
- West end: Fort Grant Road near Fort Grant
- East end: US 191 south of Safford

Location
- Country: United States
- State: Arizona

Highway system
- Arizona State Highway System; Interstate; US; State; Scenic Proposed; Former
| ← SR 264 | → SR 273 |

State Route 266 (SR 266) is a highway in Graham County, Arizona that runs from its junction with US 191 south of Safford to Fort Grant. It is an east–west route.

== Route description ==
The eastern terminus of SR 266 is located on US 191 south of Safford.The highway heads southwest from this intersection before curving towards the west. It briefly curves towards the northwest before curving back towards the west and arriving in Fort Grant. The highway continues towards the west to its western terminus in Bonita. SR 266 has a spur route that heads north from the highway to the prison at Fort Grant just prior to the highway's western terminus. SR 266 travels through sparsely populated areas and does not pass through any cities or towns. It serves primarily as an access road to Fort Grant.

== History ==
SR 266 was designated in 1957 as a state route from US 666 (now US 191) to Fort Grant. In 1961 the road was a gravel road providing access to the Coronado National Forest and Fort Grant, but it has been completely paved since that time. The highway has had several realignments since the highway was originally designated.

== Junction list ==
The entire route is in Graham County.

| Location | mi | km | Destinations | Notes |
|---|---|---|---|---|
| Bonita | 19.20 | 30.90 | Fort Grant Road / Bonita-Klondyke Road | Western terminus; road continues unpaved as Bonita-Klondyke Road |
| | 18.54 | 29.84 | SR 266 Spur – Fort Grant State Prison | |
| | 0.00 | 0.00 | US 191 – Safford, Willcox | Eastern terminus |
1.000 mi = 1.609 km; 1.000 km = 0.621 mi

== Spur route ==
State Route 266 Spur
- Location: Graham County
- Length: 3.03 mi (4.88 km)

State Route 266 Spur (SR 266S), is a short spur of SR 266 located in unincorporated Graham County. The route provides access to the State Prison complex at Fort Grant, just north of Bonita.
