= Sunizona, Arizona =

CDP in Cochise County, Arizona

- census-designated place
- Location of Sunizona in Cochise County, Arizona.

- Location in the United States
- Coordinates: 31°52′46″N 109°37′25″W
- Country: United States
- State: Arizona
- County: Cochise

Area
  - Total: 9.16 sq mi (23.73 km^{2})
  - Land: 9.16 sq mi (23.73 km^{2})
  - Water: 0 sq mi (0.00 km^{2})
- Elevation: 4,377 ft (1,334 m)

Population (2020)
  - Total: 233
  - Density: 25.4/sq mi (9.82/km^{2})
- Time zone: UTC-7 (MST (no daylight saving time))
- ZIP code: 85625
- Area code: 520
- FIPS code: 04-70460
- GNIS feature ID: 2582871

Sunizona is a census-designated place in the central portion of Cochise County in the state of Arizona, United States. Sunizona is located approximately 10 miles to the east of Pearce along Arizona State Route 181, near US 191. According to the U.S. Census Bureau, the population of Sunizona was 212 in 2019.

The median household income in Sunizona is $22,500.

Johnny Ringo, an Old West outlaw who was suspected by Wyatt Earp of having taken part in the attempted murder of Virgil Earp and the ambush and death of Morgan Earp, is buried near Sunizona.

== Demographics ==
Historical population
Census	Pop.	Note	%±
2020	233		—
U.S. Decennial Census
