= Arizona State Route 186 =

State highway in Arizona, United States

State Route 186
- SR 186 highlighted in red

Route information
- Maintained by ADOT
- Length: 33.39 mi (53.74 km)
- Existed: 1955–present

Major junctions
- West end: Virginia Avenue in Willcox
- I-10 / US 191 in Willcox
- East end: SR 181 west of Chiricahua N.P.

Location
- Country: United States
- State: Arizona

Highway system
- Arizona State Highway System; Interstate; US; State; Scenic Proposed; Former
| ← SR 181 | → SR 187 |

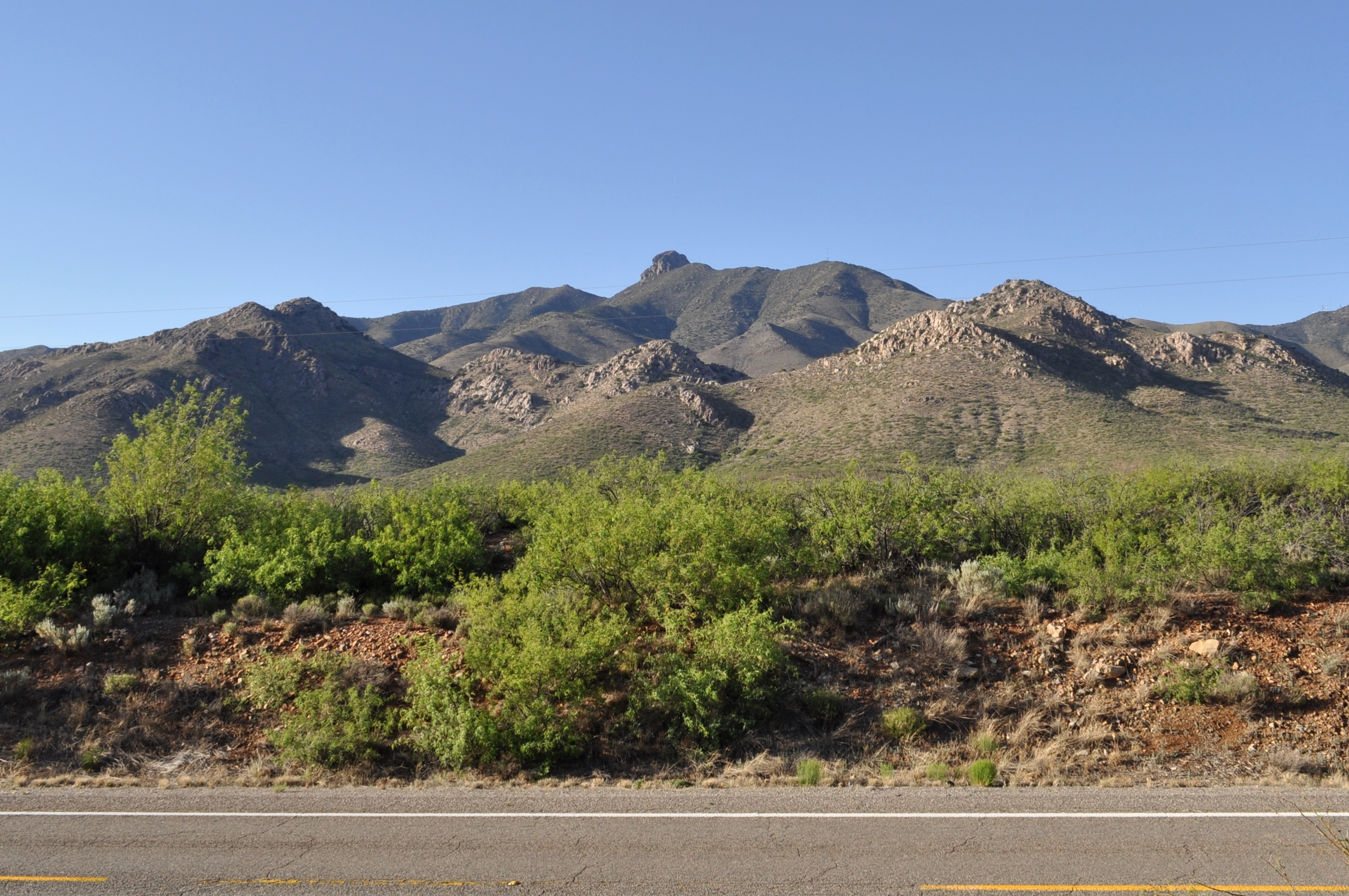
State Route 186 with the Dos Cabezas Mountains in the background

State Route 186 (SR 186) is a highway in Cochise County, Arizona that runs from its junction with Interstate 10 in Willcox to its junction with SR 181 west of Chiricahua National Park. It is a northwest–southeast diagonal route.

== Route description ==
The western terminus of SR 186 is located at Virginia Avenue, west of an interchange with I-10, in Willcox. It heads east beyond I-10 along Rex Allen Drive to an intersection with the I-10 Business Loop. SR 186 heads southwest from this intersection concurrent with I-10 Bus. until it reaches Maley Street. At this intersection, SR 186 follows Maley St. to the southeast as I-10 Bus. continues to the southwest. SR 186 heads southeast from Willcox until it curves towards the east at an intersection with Kansas Settlement Road. The highway continues on this heading until it curves towards the south after passing through Dos Cabezas. The highway curves back towards the southeast until it curves back towards the south near its eastern terminus. The eastern terminus of SR 186 is located at ain intersection with SR 181 west of Chiricahua National Park.

Aside from its endpoint in Willcox, SR 186 passes through only sparsely populated terrain, and there are no other cities or towns along the route. It serves primarily as an access road for the monument, providing a more convenient route for travelers coming from the north.

== History ==
The route was added the Arizona's state highway system in 1955, when a county road was given rights to the Arizona Department of Transportation. The highway was paved from Willcox southeast for approximately four miles in 1960 before being moved a year later. The highway was then re-extended into the city of Willcox in 1968 and formally established as a state highway in 1970, when the definition of a state highway was refined in 1970. Since then, there have been no routing changes on SR 186.

== Junction list ==
The entire route is in Cochise County.

| Location | mi | km | Destinations | Notes |
|---|---|---|---|---|
| Willcox | 0.00 | 0.00 | Virginia Avenue | Western terminus; road continues as Fort Grant Road |
| Willcox | 0.14 | 0.23 | I-10 / US 191 – Tucson, Douglas, El Paso, Safford | ADOT signs this as western terminus; exit 340 on I-10 |
| Willcox | 1.31 | 2.11 | BL 10 east (Haskell Avenue) | West end of I-10 Bus. concurrency |
| Willcox | 2.02 | 3.25 | BL 10 west (Haskell Avenue) | East end of I-10 Bus. concurrency |
| | 33.39 | 53.74 | SR 181 – Chiricahua National Park | Eastern terminus |
1.000 mi = 1.609 km; 1.000 km = 0.621 mi: Concurrency terminus
