= Arizona State Route 61 =

Highway in Arizona

State Route 61
- SR 61 highlighted in red

Route information
- Maintained by ADOT
- Length: 76.51 mi (123.13 km)
- Existed: 1935–present

Major junctions
- South end: US 60 east of Show Low
- US 180 in St. Johns; US 191 in St. Johns
- North end: NM 53 at the New Mexico State Line near Zuni, NM

Location
- Country: United States
- State: Arizona

Highway system
- Arizona State Highway System; Interstate; US; State; Scenic Proposed; Former
← US 60	→ SR 62

State Route 61, also known as SR 61, is a 76.51-mile-long (123.13 km) state highway in northern Arizona running generally southwest to northeast, from its southern terminus at U.S. Route 60 (US 60) east of Show Low to the New Mexico border at Zuni, where it becomes New Mexico State Road 53. Parts of this route, particularly near St. Johns, overlap US 180 and US 191.

== Route description ==
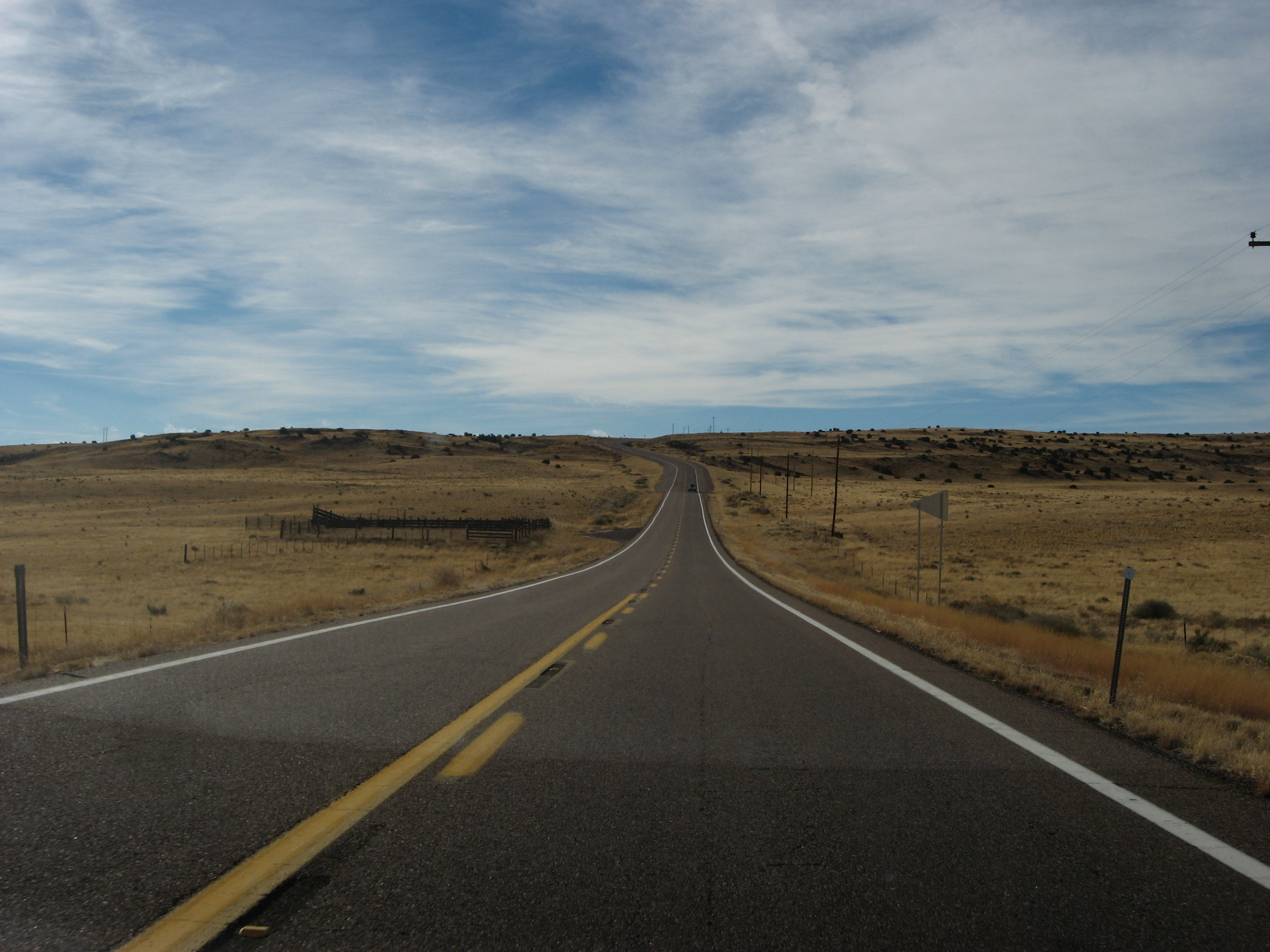
SR 61 between St. Johns and Concho

The southern terminus of SR 61 is located at a junction with US 60 east of Show Low. From here, the highway heads towards the northeast towards an intersection with SR 180A. After this intersection, SR 61 begins to follow a more easterly heading to a junction with US 180. SR 61 runs concurrently with US 180 from this intersection eastward to an intersection with US 191 in St. Johns. While US 180 continues to the south concurrent with US 191, SR 61 begins to run concurrently with US 191 to the north. The two split north of St. Johns with US 191 continuing to head north and SR 61 heads off towards the northeast. SR 61 reaches its northern terminus at the New Mexico border while the highway itself continues into New Mexico as New Mexico State Road 53.

== History ==
In 1913, the National Old Trails Highway Association mapped a cross-country automobile route that included an alternative alignment through Springerville and St. Johns to Holbrook, reflecting the importance of the corridor that would later form part of SR 61. This route was incorporated into Arizona’s Seven-Percent Federal-Aid Highway System in the 1920s, ensuring federal investment in road improvements across Apache County.

State Route 61 was officially designated in the 1930s, connecting U.S. Route 60 east of Show Low with US 666 (present day US 191 in St. Johns before continuing to the New Mexico state line. Early construction relied on gravel and oil surfacing, with federal-aid and New Deal work-relief programs in the 1930s improving many rural roads in northeastern Arizona. Paving and modernization continued through the mid-twentieth century, paralleling statewide efforts to replace older dirt and oiled roads with asphalt highways.

== Junction list ==
The entire route is in Apache County.

Location	mi	km	Destinations	Notes
	0.00	0.00	US 60 – Springerville, Show Low	Southern terminus
Concho	19.13	30.79	SR 180A west – Petrified Forest, Holbrook	Former US 260 west
	28.72	46.22	US 180 west – Petrified Forest, Holbrook	South end of US 180 concurrency
St. Johns	33.68	54.20	US 180 east / US 191 south (2nd Street East) – Springerville	North end of US 180 concurrency; south end of US 191 concurrency; former US 260 east/US 666 south
	62.76	101.00	US 191 north – Sanders, Gallup	North end of US 191 concurrency; former US 666 north
	76.51	123.13	NM 53 east	Continuation into New Mexico
1.000 mi = 1.609 km; 1.000 km = 0.621 mi: Concurrency terminus
