= York, Arizona =

CDP in Greenlee County, Arizona

- Census-designated place
- Location of York in Greenlee County, Arizona.

- Location within Arizona Location within the United States
- Coordinates: 32°54′59″N 109°11′43″W
- Country: United States
- State: Arizona
- County: Greenlee

Area
  - Total: 2.05 sq mi (5.31 km^{2})
  - Land: 2.05 sq mi (5.31 km^{2})
  - Water: 0 sq mi (0.00 km^{2})
- Elevation: 3,507 ft (1,069 m)

Population (2020)
  - Total: 599
  - Density: 292.1/sq mi (112.78/km^{2})
- Time zone: UTC-7 (MST (no DST))
- ZIP code: 85534
- Area code: 928
- FIPS code: 04-20750
- GNIS feature ID: 2582911

York, also known as York Valley, is a census-designated place in Greenlee County, Arizona, United States. As of the 2020 census, the population was 599.

It is located along Arizona State Route 75, 12 miles (19 km) south of Clifton, the Greenlee County seat, and 16 miles (26 km) north of Duncan. Most residents work for Freeport-McMoRan at the Morenci Mine northwest of Clifton. The major housing is in trailer homes. York is also close to the Greenlee County Airport and is home to the Greenlee County Country Club.

== Demographics ==
Historical population
| Census | Pop. | Note | %± |
|---|---|---|---|
| 2020 | 599 | | — |
U.S. Decennial Census
