= Arizona State Route 181 =

State highway in Arizona, United States

State Route 181
- SR 181 highlighted in red

Route information
- Maintained by ADOT
- Length: 26.80 mi (43.13 km)
- Existed: 1970–present

Major junctions
- West end: US 191 near Pearce
- East end: Chiricahua N.P.

Location
- Country: United States
- State: Arizona

Highway system
- Arizona State Highway System; Interstate; US; State; Scenic Proposed; Former
← SR 179	→ SR 186

State Route 181 (SR 181) is a highway in Cochise County, Arizona that runs from its junction with US 191 east of Pearce to Chiricahua National Park. It is an east–west route for the half east of Pearce, but becomes a primarily north–south route on the half approaching the monument.

SR 181 serves primarily as an access to the monument, although it also services the settlement of Sunizona east of Pearce.

== Route description ==
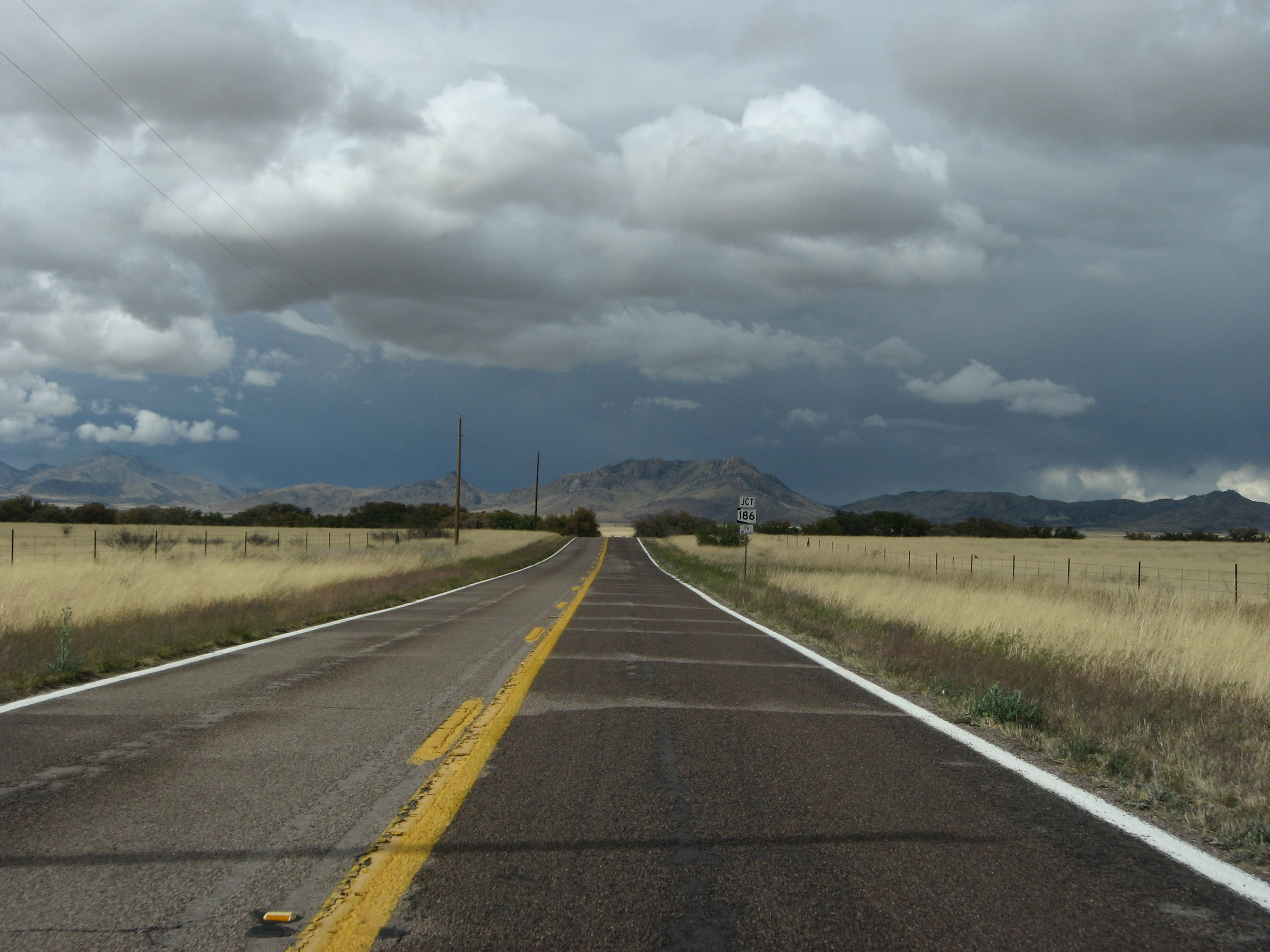
State Route 181, near Chiricahua National Park, Arizona

The western terminus is located at US 191 east of Pearce. The highway heads east from this intersection through Sunizona where the highway briefly heads towards the south before curving back towards the east. It continues towards the east until it turns towards the north at an intersection with Turkey Creek and Kuykendall Cutoff roads. The highway continues heading towards the north with the occasional curve towards the northeast before continuing north. When SR 181 reaches an intersection with SR 186, SR 181 turns towards the east. It continues towards the east until it reaches its eastern terminus at the Chiricahua National Park boundary.

== History ==
The route was established by the Arizona Department of Transportation between 1935 and 1938 with its current routing from SR 81 (now US 191) to the Chiricahua National Monument. Since then, the routing has not been changed and SR 181 remains as when it was defined.

== Junction list ==
The entire route is in Cochise County.

Location	mi	km	Destinations	Notes
Sunizona	0.00	0.00	US 191 to I-10 – Douglas, Bisbee, Willcox	Southern terminus
	22.79	36.68	SR 186 west – Willcox	
	26.80	43.13	Chiricahua National Park	Northern terminus
1.000 mi = 1.609 km; 1.000 km = 0.621 mi
