= Concho, Arizona =

CDP in Apache County, Arizona

- Census-designated place
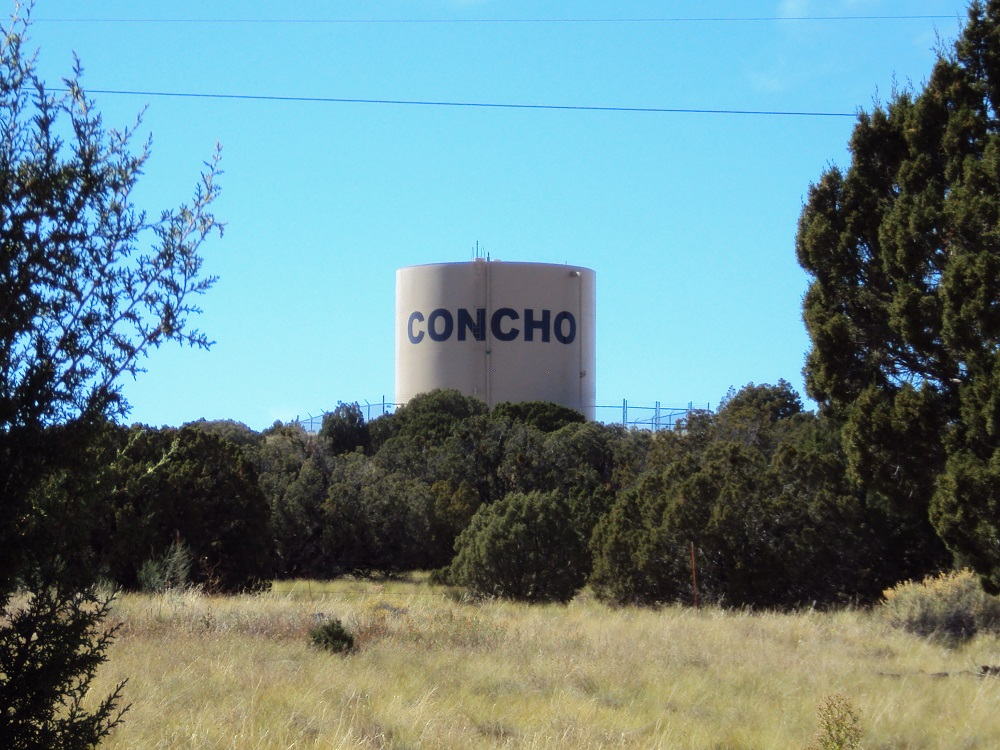
- West view of the water tower in the Concho Valley area, as seen along SR 61

- Location of Concho in Apache County, Arizona.

- Location within Arizona
- Coordinates: 34°28′28″N 109°36′36″W
- Country: United States
- State: Arizona
- County: Apache

Area
  - Total: 0.46 sq mi (1.20 km^{2})
  - Land: 0.46 sq mi (1.19 km^{2})
  - Water: 0.0039 sq mi (0.01 km^{2})
- Elevation: 5,952 ft (1,814 m)

Population (2020)
  - Total: 54
  - Density: 117.7/sq mi (45.45/km^{2})
- Time zone: UTC-7 (Mountain (MST))
- ZIP code: 85924
- Area code: 928
- GNIS feature ID: 2582761

Concho is an unincorporated community and census-designated place (CDP) in Apache County, Arizona, United States. Concho is located on Arizona State Route 61, 14 miles (23 km) west of St. Johns. As of the 2020 census, the Concho CDP had a population of 54.

Concho has the ZIP code 85924. The United States Postal Service operates the Concho Post Office along Arizona State Route 61.

== History ==
Prior to the arrival of Europeans, the Concho area was home to Indigenous Ancestral Puebloan peoples; the ruins of their pueblos can still be seen all over the area to this day. Indigenous Athabaskan speakers – the ancestors of today's Apache and Navajo peoples, the largest Indigenous groups in northeastern Arizona – arrived in the region somewhere between the 1100s and 1400s CE, the earliest confirmed physical evidence of their presence being a Diné-style three-fork dwelling dated to about 1389 CE. The Concho area remained firmly in Apache control until the end of the Apache Wars in the late 19th century, following the surrender of Lozen and Goyaałé.

The first permanent, non-Indigenous settlers of Concho were several Hispanic New Mexican families in the late 1800s. The exact date of Concho's founding is unknown, but likely occurred in the late 1850s or early 1860s. Don Manuel Antonio Candelaria, originally of Cubero, NM, is generally credited with being the first known settler of Concho: he first entered the area in the 1840s, when he was a child and an Apache captive. He was adopted by the tribe and lived among them as a full Apache tribal member for many years, until deciding to return to Cubero as a young man to reconnect with his birth family. After re-learning Spanish and eventually marrying Regina Baca, Candelaria returned to Concho with his family and 700 head of sheep and goats to permanently settle the area in 1861 (though he indicated that a scant handful of other Hispanic New Mexicans had also come to settle the area a few years prior). Several other Hispanic New Mexican families - most notably the Archunde, Atencio, Baca, Chavez, Gallegos, Padilla, and Romero families - followed suit and founded the town by the 1870s.

While some folklore says that the name "Concho" comes from a Basque word meaning "a small valley," there is no linguistic, ethnographic, or historical evidence that seems to support this claim - or indeed, that there was ever a sustained Basque presence in the region. Instead, based on historical and ethnographic data (ibid.: 31), the name most likely comes from the Spanish word concha (meaning "shell"). Early settlers noted an abundance of small shells along the Concho Creek (which then ran year-round) and named the settlements "Las Conchas," or "The Shells." New Mexican church records indicate that the Las Conchas settlement was officially known as "El Rio Colorado Chiquito" ("The Small Red/Colored River"), but locals simply referred to it as Las Conchas (ibid.). Over time, this name transmuted into "El Concho", which eventually was shortened to "Concho."

A group of Latter-Day Saints led by William J. Flake arrived in 1879 after Flake and Bateman H. Wilhelm purchased some of the land from José Francisco Chaves under the direction of Apostle Erastus Snow. The LDS community adopted the name Erastus in honor of Snow, but changed the name back to Concho to match the continuing Mexican community in 1890.

"The town was once the major population and financial center of the northeast quarter of what is now Arizona. It continued as a thriving small town for many years." Nevertheless, circumstances such as World War II caused residents to leave the area, and in time Concho dwindled down to a small community.

The village (CDP) of Concho, sometimes referred to as "Old Concho", is rich in tradition and folklore. Each year the villagers enjoy coming together for the San Rafael Fiestas, when residents and relatives from afar gather for joyful celebration and reminiscing. Concho also celebrates Memorial Day with a parade and town picnic.

The newer portion of Concho, outside the CDP, is the highland country referred to as "Concho Valley", established in 1971. Growth in this development primarily took place as a result of the construction of the Coronado Generating Station located west of St. Johns, operated as part of the Salt River Project.

== Demographics ==
Historical population
Census	Pop.	Note	%±
2020	54		—
U.S. Decennial Census

== Education ==
Concho is served by the Concho Elementary School District, with its school being Concho Elementary School.

The Apache County Library District operates the Concho Public Library.
