= Duncan, Arizona =

Town in Greenlee County, Arizona

- Town
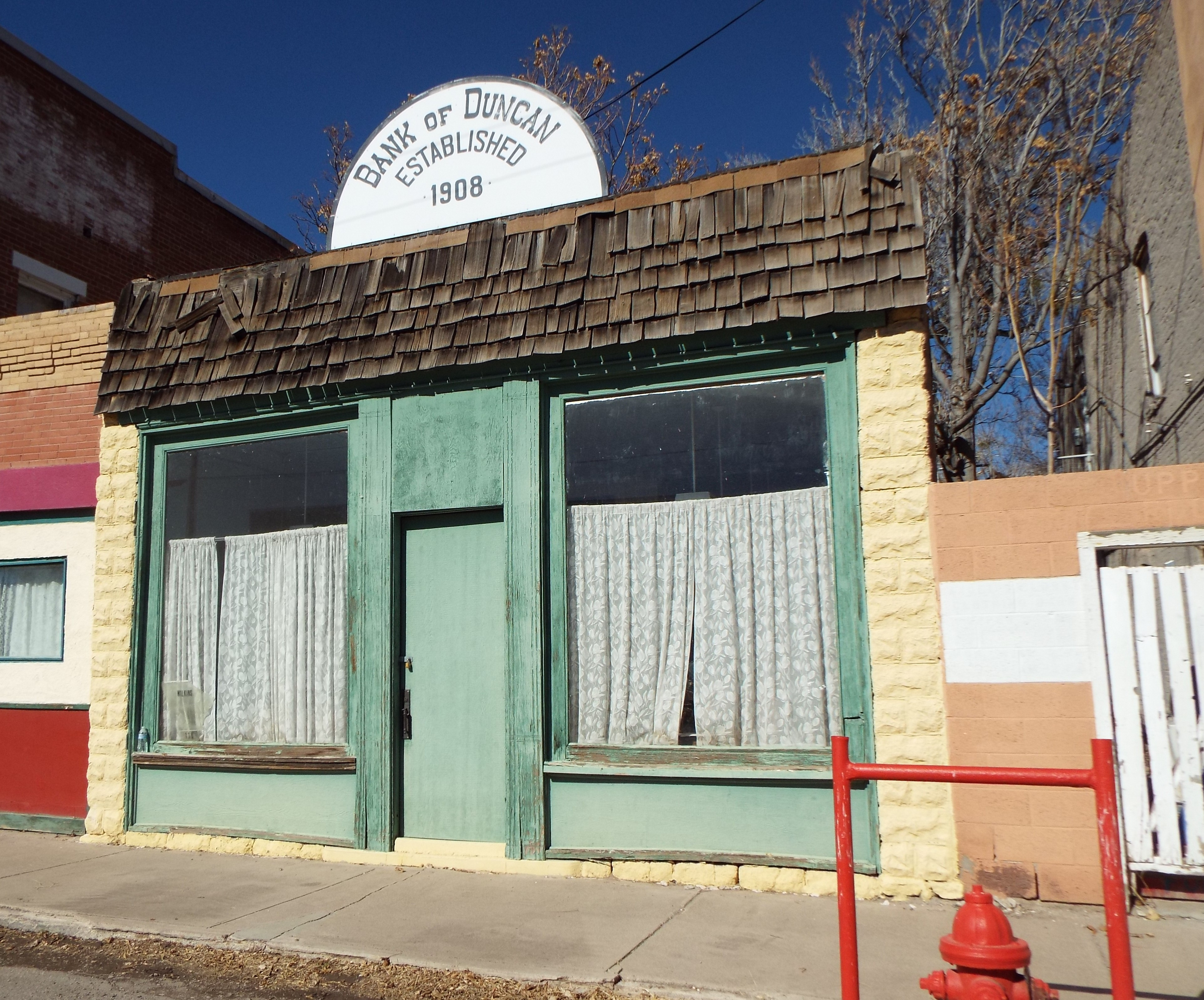
- Bank of Duncan – 1908

- Flag

- Location of Duncan in Greenlee County, Arizona

- Location in the United States
- Coordinates: 32°44′00″N 109°05′52″W
- Country: United States
- State: Arizona
- County: Greenlee
- Incorporated: 1938

Government
  - Type: Municipal (Council/Manager Form)

Area
  - Total: 2.15 sq mi (5.57 km^{2})
  - Land: 2.15 sq mi (5.57 km^{2})
  - Water: 0 sq mi (0.00 km^{2})
- Elevation: 3,763 ft (1,147 m)

Population (2020)
  - Total: 694
  - Density: 322.5/sq mi (124.52/km^{2})
- Time zone: UTC−7 (MST (no DST))
- ZIP code: 85534
- Area code: 928
- FIPS code: 04-20750
- GNIS feature ID: 2412451
- Website: duncanaz.us

Duncan is a town in Greenlee County, Arizona, United States. As of the 2020 census, Duncan had a population of 694.

Duncan is in the Gila River valley, four miles (6 km) west of the Arizona–New Mexico border. The town limits are on both sides of the Gila River, but the primary portion of the town and the entire downtown area lies on the south side of the river.

Duncan was founded in the mid-19th century, and the land was added to the United States as a part of the Mexican Cession, and the Gadsden Purchase. The town of Duncan has been destroyed twice by flood and once by fire.

The town and unincorporated county surrounding the town are primarily populated by farming, ranching, and mining families. (Freeport-McMoRan Inc., Morenci & Safford copper mines in southeastern Arizona and Chino & Tyrone in southwestern New Mexico). Surrounding smaller unincorporated settlements such as Franklin and York in Arizona, and the Village of Virden, New Mexico, all use Duncan public schools. The areas along the Gila River are renowned for Native American artifacts such as arrowheads, pottery, burial sites, cave paintings, and other remnants of the Anasazi and other pre-historic cultures that inhabited the area until overpopulation and severe droughts between 1000 and 1290 C.E. caused them to vanish (a remnant of the Chiricahua Band of Apache Indians remained in the upper Gila River Valley as late as the 1930s), as well as artifacts from garrison camps of the expedition of Francisco Vázquez de Coronado.

Duncan High School (mascot: Wildkat; school colors: red, grey, and white) competes in many sports, Fall - Men's "8 Man" Football AIA Div 1, Ladies' VolleyBall, M/W Cross-country; Winter - M/W Basketball; Spring - Men's Baseball, Women's Softball, M/W Tennis, M/W Golf, M/W Track & Field.

U.S. Supreme Court Justice Sandra Day O'Connor was born in El Paso, Texas, but grew up near Duncan on the Lazy B ranch, which straddles the border between Arizona and New Mexico. The Day family ran the ranch for many years until selling it; it continues to be run as a ranch. O'Connor later wrote a book titled Lazy B: Growing up on a Cattle Ranch in the American Southwest about her childhood experiences on the ranch with her brother H. Alan Day.

== Geography ==
U.S. Route 70 passes through downtown, leading west 39 miles (63 km) to Safford, Arizona, and southeast 35 miles (56 km) to Lordsburg, New Mexico, and Interstate 10. Arizona State Route 75 leads north from Duncan 28 miles (45 km) to Clifton.

According to the United States Census Bureau, the town of Duncan has a total area of 2.2 square miles (5.6 km^{2}), all of it land.

=== Climate ===
Duncan has a semi-arid climate (Köppen climate classification BSk) with huge diurnal temperature ranges year-round except during periods of thundery monsoon weather. In April the average diurnal range is as high as 43.7 °F (24.3 °C) and it is only less than 36 °F (20 °C) in the often stormy months of July and August when over a third of the year's total rainfall can be expected.

During a typical year 131.6 nights will fall below 32 °F (0 °C), but only 7.8 days fail to top 50 °F (10 °C), and there are only seven occurrences of nights falling to 0 °F (−17.8 °C) or lower, notably on December 24, 1953, and January 11, 1962, when the record low of −2 °F (−18.9 °C) was set.

Rainfall is generally scanty outside of the monsoon season, with substantial falls from winter storms being rare, although December 1991 did see 4.76 inches or 120.9 millimetres of rain. The wettest month since continuous records began in 1942 has been August 2014 with 6.17 inches or 156.7 millimetres, whilst the wettest calendar year has been 1983 with 18.88 inches or 479.6 millimetres and the driest 1956 with 3.49 inches or 88.6 millimetres. Snowfall is most unusual, with the median being zero and the mean only 0.5 inches (0.013 m). The most snowfall ever in Duncan was 15.0 inches or 0.38 metres during the record Western cold wave of January 1949.

Climate data for Duncan, Arizona (1971–2000; extremes 1901–2001)
Month	Jan	Feb	Mar	Apr	May	Jun	Jul	Aug	Sep	Oct	Nov	Dec	Year
Record high °F (°C)	80 (27)	85 (29)	95 (35)	100 (38)	108 (42)	111 (44)	110 (43)	107 (42)	103 (39)	99 (37)	87 (31)	78 (26)	111 (44)
Mean daily maximum °F (°C)	60.0 (15.6)	65.0 (18.3)	71.0 (21.7)	79.3 (26.3)	87.7 (30.9)	96.9 (36.1)	97.1 (36.2)	94.4 (34.7)	90.1 (32.3)	80.3 (26.8)	68.2 (20.1)	59.6 (15.3)	79.1 (26.2)
Mean daily minimum °F (°C)	23.7 (−4.6)	26.5 (−3.1)	31.0 (−0.6)	35.6 (2.0)	44.6 (7.0)	53.6 (12.0)	63.3 (17.4)	62.2 (16.8)	54.2 (12.3)	41.0 (5.0)	28.5 (−1.9)	22.9 (−5.1)	40.6 (4.8)
Record low °F (°C)	−2 (−19)	−1 (−18)	9 (−13)	13 (−11)	22 (−6)	32 (0)	42 (6)	39 (4)	34 (1)	17 (−8)	6 (−14)	−2 (−19)	−2 (−19)
Average rainfall inches (mm)	0.96 (24)	0.94 (24)	0.62 (16)	0.24 (6.1)	0.38 (9.7)	0.38 (9.7)	2.26 (57)	2.18 (55)	1.06 (27)	1.30 (33)	0.77 (20)	1.19 (30)	12.28 (311.5)
Average rainy days (≥ 0.01 inch)	5.0	4.5	4.1	1.5	1.9	2.2	8.5	8.5	4.6	4.4	2.9	4.7	52.8
Source: National Oceanic and Atmospheric Administration

== Demographics ==
Historical population
Census	Pop.	Note	%±
1940	887		—
1950	941		6.1%
1960	862		−8.4%
1970	773		−10.3%
1980	603		−22.0%
1990	662		9.8%
2000	812		22.7%
2010	696		−14.3%
2020	694		−0.3%
U.S. Decennial Census

As of the census of 2000, there were 812 people, 294 households, and 206 families residing in the town. The population density was 317.6 inhabitants per square mile (122.6/km^{2}). There were 384 housing units at an average density of 150.2/sq mi (58.0/km^{2}). The racial makeup of the town was 81.8% White, 0.5% Black or African American, 0.9% Native American, 0.1% Asian, 13.6% from other races, and 3.2% from two or more races. 31.5% of the population were Hispanic or Latino of any race.

There were 294 households, out of which 42.2% had children under the age of 18 living with them, 46.3% were married couples living together, 17.7% had a female householder with no husband present, and 29.6% were non-families. 25.9% of all households were made up of individuals, and 12.9% had someone living alone who was 65 years of age or older. The average household size was 2.76 and the average family size was 3.33.

In the town, the population was spread out, with 35.2% under the age of 18, 10.6% from 18 to 24, 22.2% from 25 to 44, 21.2% from 45 to 64, and 10.8% who were 65 years of age or older. The median age was 28 years. For every 100 females, there were 90.6 males. For every 100 females age 18 and over, there were 91.3 males.

The median income for a household in the town was $27,368, and the median income for a family was $33,750. Males had a median income of $32,232 versus $18,333 for females. The per capita income for the town was $13,642. About 14.0% of families and 16.5% of the population were below the poverty line, including 17.4% of those under age 18 and 23.2% of those age 65 or over.

== Transportation ==
Greyhound Lines serves Duncan on its Phoenix–El Paso via Globe route.
