= Fort Grant, Arizona =

State prison and former US Army base

Fort Grant
- Aravaipa Canyon, Arizona
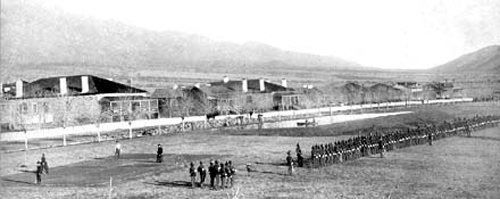
- Fort Grant, c. 1885

Site information
- Type: Army fortification
- Controlled by: Arizona
- Condition: Repurposed as a state prison

Location
- Coordinates: 32°37′26.1″N 109°56′41.7″W

Site history
- Built: 1872
- Built by: United States
- In use: 1860–1905
- Battles/wars: Apache Wars

Garrison information
- Occupants: United States Army

Fort Grant is a state prison and a former United States Army fortification in the U.S. state of Arizona. Fort Grant is located on the southwestern slope of Mount Graham in what is now Graham County. The post is named for Ulysses S. Grant, the 18th President of the United States.

== History ==
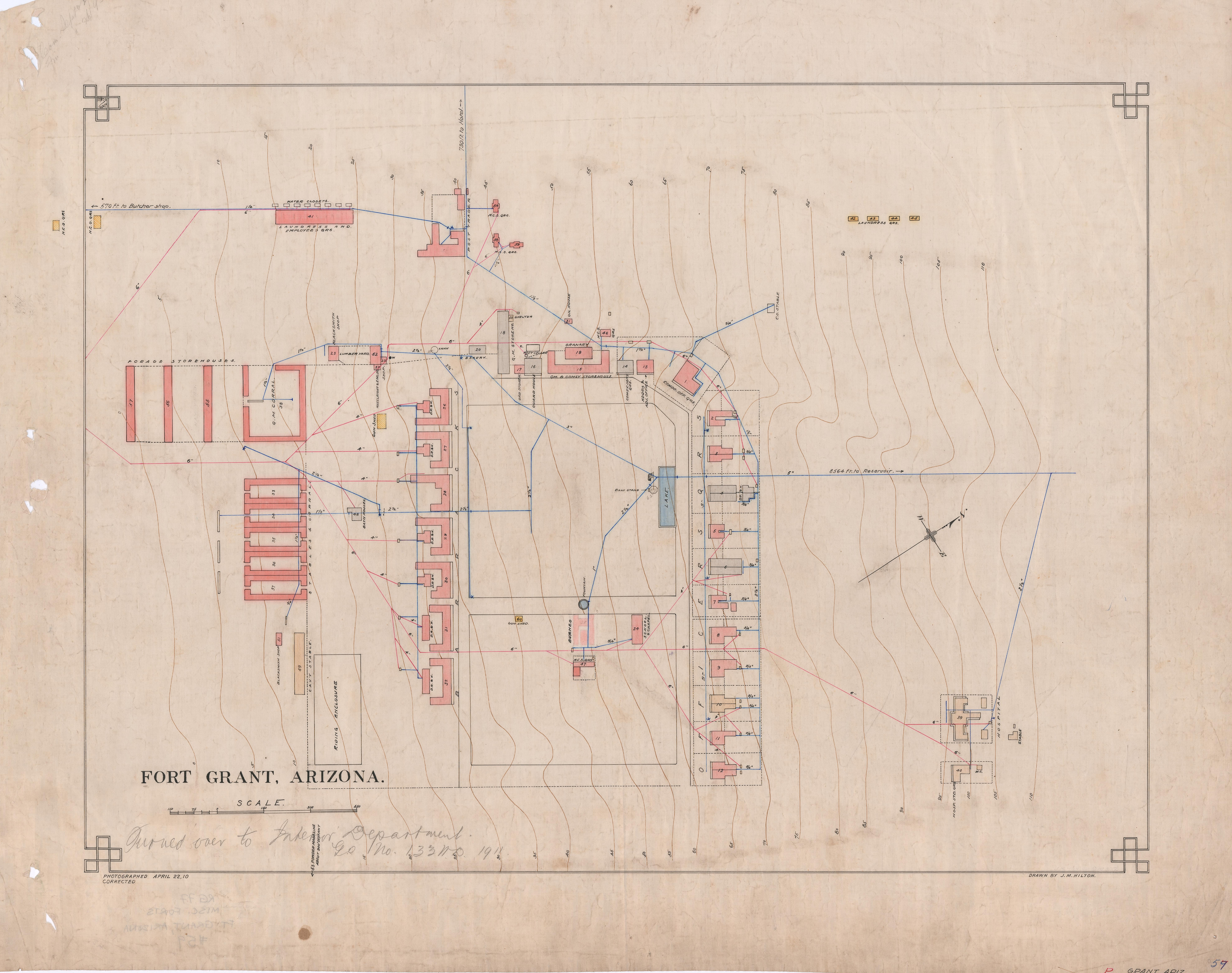
Plan of Fort Grant

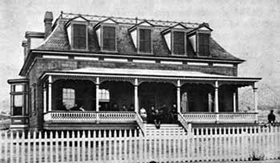
The officers' quarters at Fort Grant

Fort Grant began its life in August 1860 in the Arizona Territory as an Old West outpost named Fort Breckinridge, at the junction of Aravaipa Creek and the San Pedro River. Fort Breckinridge was destroyed and the site was abandoned in 1861, following removal of the Union garrison at the start of the American Civil War.

The site of Fort Breckinridge was reoccupied as Fort Stanford, or Camp Stanford, from 1862 to 1865 by troops of the California Column. When the U.S. Army proper finally reoccupied the site, it was renamed Camp Grant between 1865 and 1872. In 1872, after the Camp Grant Massacre, the United States Army post at "old" Camp Grant (at the confluence of Aravaipa Creek and the San Pedro River) was relocated to the southwestern slope of Mount Graham in what is now Graham County. The new fort was strategically placed so as to protect settlers who were constantly harassed by Apache warriors. It played a prominent role in the Apache Wars of the 1880s.

Henry McCarty, better known as "Billy the Kid", reportedly settled in the vicinity of Fort Grant in 1876, working as a ranch hand and tending sheep nearby. In 1877, McCarty killed a local blacksmith at a saloon and gambling house that is now called the Bonita Store, located a few miles from Fort Grant. McCarty was taken into custody at the Fort Grant stockade, but escaped to the New Mexico Territory before he could be tried. Fort Grant was also the departure point for the pay wagons carrying currency during the Wham Paymaster robbery of 1889.

Edgar Rice Burroughs was stationed at Fort Grant in 1896 as an enlisted man after failing the entrance exam for the United States Military Academy at West Point. He was discharged in 1897 after being diagnosed with a heart condition that made him ineligible for a commission. The fort was repurposed in 1900 as a staging point for soldiers going to the Philippines to fight in the Philippine–American War.

Fort Grant was abandoned by the Army in 1905, which transferred all troops to Fort Huachuca and left the fort unoccupied except for a caretaker. In 1912, Arizona gained statehood, and the fort was occupied by the State Industrial School for Wayward Boys and Girls, which modernized most of the buildings.

In 1968, the state of Arizona officially assigned the site to the Department of Corrections, and in 1973, Fort Grant became a state prison for male convicts. In 1997, the prison became a unit of an Arizona State Prison complex headquartered in Safford. The main road to and from Fort Grant is Arizona State Route 266. An abandoned general-aviation airport, Angel Field, is immediately south of the prison.

== Fort Grant Historical Museum ==
The Fort Grant Historical Museum was once located in the lobby of the administration building, outside the prison grounds. The museum featured artifacts and photos about the fort's military history up through its history as a state reformatory and later as a state prison.

Fort Grant no longer has a visitor area or museum. Visitors are not allowed on prison property unless it is to visit an incarcerated inmate. The administration building has been closed and has no known plans to reopen.

== Climate ==
According to the Köppen climate classification, Fort Grant has a semi-arid climate, BSk on climate maps.

== See also ==
- Camp Grant, Arizona
