= Gila, New Mexico =

- Census-designated place
- Location within New Mexico Location within the United States
- Coordinates: 32°56′55″N 108°34′34″W
- Country: United States
- State: New Mexico
- County: Grant

Area
  - Total: 9.39 sq mi (24.33 km^{2})
  - Land: 9.36 sq mi (24.25 km^{2})
  - Water: 0.031 sq mi (0.08 km^{2})
- Elevation: 4,620 ft (1,410 m)

Population (2020)
  - Total: 285
  - Density: 30.4/sq mi (11.75/km^{2})
- Time zone: UTC-7 (MST)
  - Summer (DST): UTC-6 (MDT)
- ZIP code: 88038
- Area code: 575
- FIPS code: 35-17-29160
- GNIS feature ID: 2584102

Gila is a census-designated place (CDP) in Grant County, New Mexico, United States. It is 48 kilometres (30 miles) northwest of the county seat, Silver City. Its population was 285 as of the 2020 census. The community is located in the irrigated valley of the Gila River in the midst of hilly and mountainous semi-arid terrain. The townsite was sporadically populated by the Apache, Spanish and Mexican colonists, and American mountain men prior to the rise to prominence of the million-acre Lyons & Campbell Ranch. The ranch established its headquarters in Gila in 1890 and was one of the largest ranches in the United States. The headquarters building is on the National Register of Historic Places.

== History ==
The Gila River valley was attractive for human settlement because the river was one of the few dependable water sources in the arid southwestern United States. In the 18th and 19th century, the Gila valley near the present day town was the homeland of the Bedonkohe band of the Chiricahua Apache. One of the birthplaces proposed for the Apache warrior Geronimo is Turkey Creek Hot Springs in the Mogollon Mountains, 20 kilometres (12 miles) north of present day Gila and within the Gila Wilderness. In 1792, the Spanish rulers of Mexico established a rancheria at Gila, one of a chain of settlements in northern Mexico designed to keep peace with the Apache. The Spanish built a ten room adobe building on the site. About 1829 American mountain men built a "frontier hacienda" at Gila for trade with the Apache and fur trapping. The hacienda they built (presumably with Apache help) was substantial, containing 12 rooms, an interior courtyard, and a perimeter wall. A 30-foot deep well provided water.

In the 1830s warfare between the Apache and the newly-independent country of Mexico forced the Mexicans to abandon settlements in the Gila River area of New Mexico. The last Apache raid in the area was in May 1885 when a small band of Apaches led by Chihuahua fleeing the San Carlos Apache Indian Reservation crossed the Gila River near Gila.

=== Lyons & Campbell Ranch ===
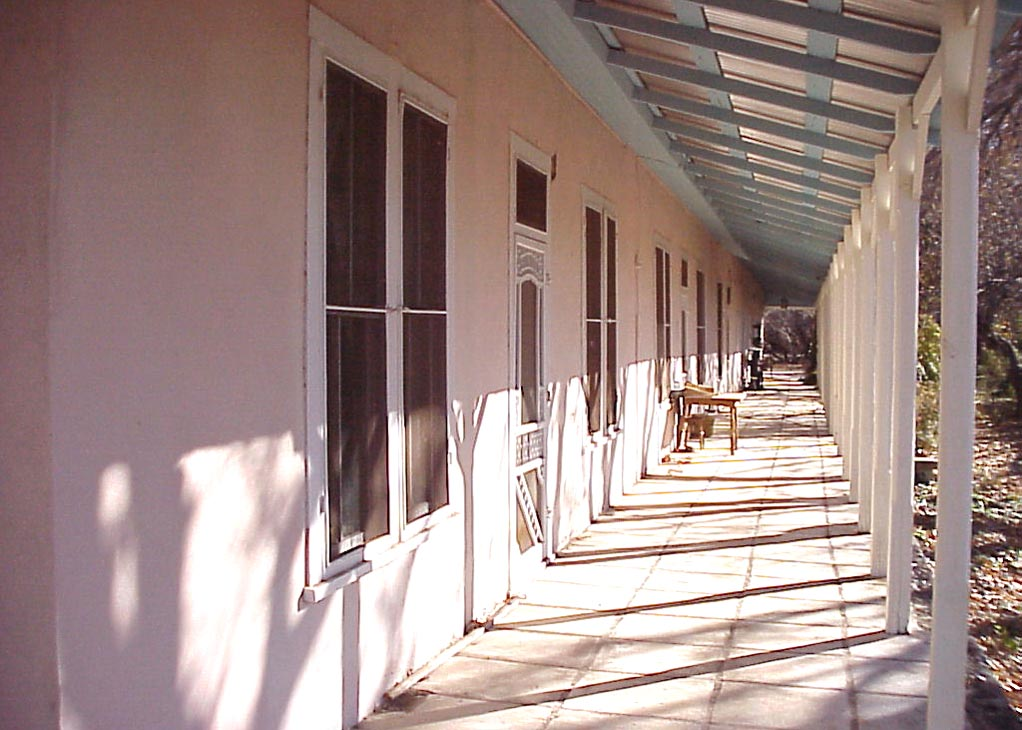
The east portal of the ranch headquarters, built of adobe.

The founders and proprietors of the Lyons & Campbell Ranch, headquartered in Gila, were Tom Lyons (1850-1917) and Angus Campbell (1844-1892). Lyons was born in England, and grew up in Kenosha, Wisconsin. In 1878 or 1879 he came to Silver City and went into the mining business with Angus Campbell, a prospector. In 1880, they sold their mining assets and bought the White House Ranch, 15 kilometres (9.3 miles) north of Gila. In 1890 they moved their ranch headquarters south to present-day Gila. In 1892, Campbell died, leaving Lyons and Campbell's widow, Ida Runyon Campbell (1867-1954) as owners of the ranch. Lyons and Campbell subsequently married. Lyon's previous wife Emma Olive Lyons (1856-1903) had fled the marriage after Lyons shot and killed her lover.

In the 1890s the Lyons & Campbell Ranch, also called the L.C. Ranch, controlled more than 400,000 hectares (990,000 acres) of land and owned 60,000 cattle. The ranchlands reached from near Silver City on the east, westward to the Arizona border and southward from near Mule Creek, New Mexico along both sides of the Gila River to the northern part of the Animas Valley. The ranch owned "100 wagons, 750 riding horses, 400 work horses, 75 cowboys in season, and three to six chuckwagons. The farming operation employed 100 Mexican families, most of them imported from Chihuahua."

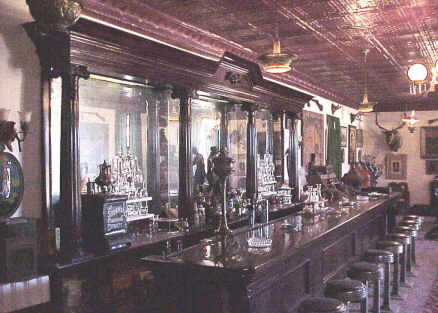
The saloon at the ranch headquarters.

At Gila, Lyons built his headquarters. He converted the existing 12 rooms of the frontier hacienda into his residence and office. He added another 15 lavishly furnished rooms for guests and entertaining. Attached to the living quarters or in separate buildings was a stable, barn, bunkhouse, store, post office, jail, foreman's house, and saloon. Lyon's bedroom featured a trapdoor where he could hide if necessary from his numerous enemies who might attempt to kill or kidnap him.

Lyons was murdered in 1917 in El Paso, Texas by a hired assassin. The identity of the person who hired the assassin was never discovered. Parcels of the ranch were subsequently sold and only a 2 hectares (4.9 acres) parcel containing the headquarters buildings remain. In 1978 the property, partially restored, was added to the National Register of Historic Places.

== Geography ==
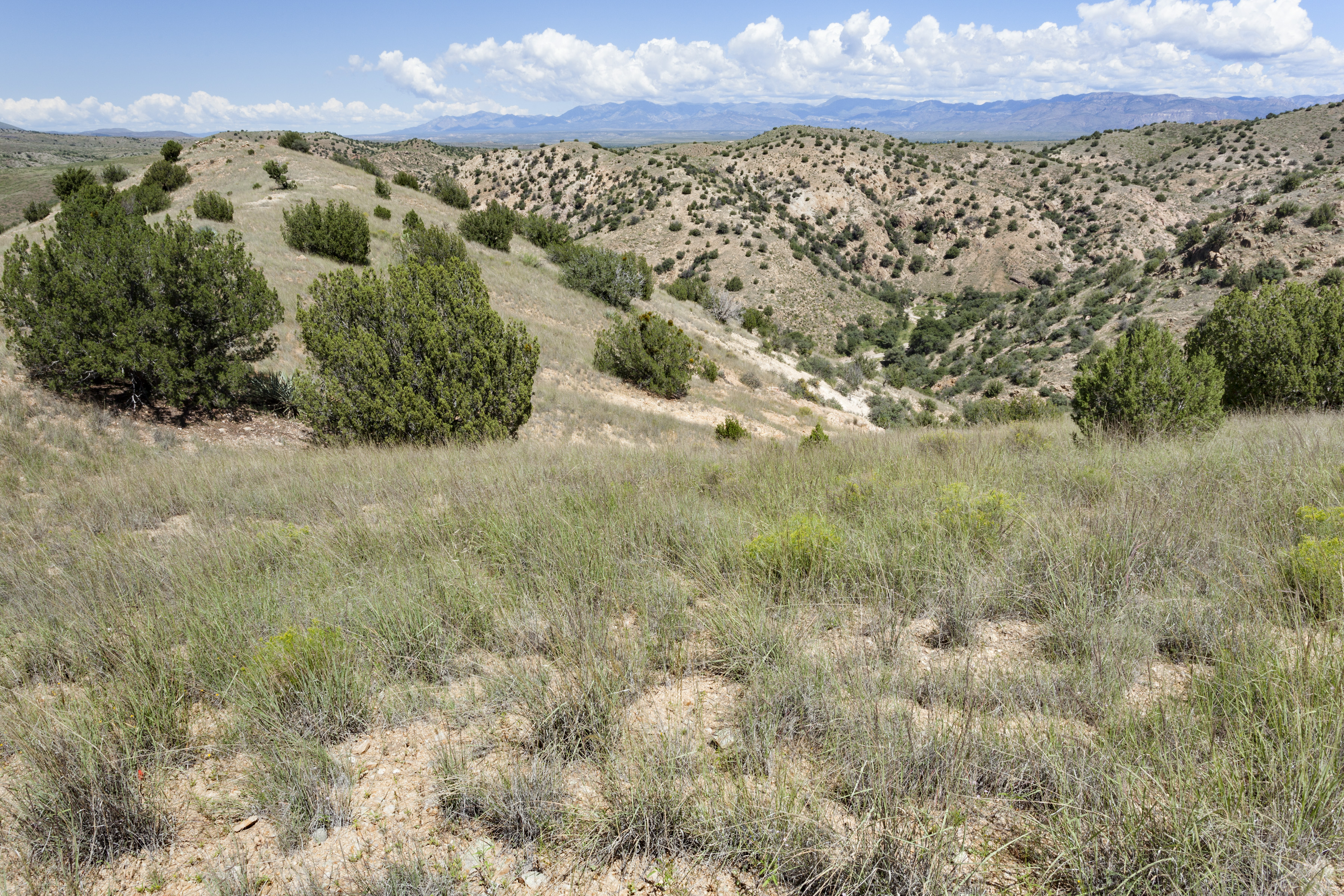
A typical landscape near Gila looking north to the Mogollon Mountains.

The community of Gila sits near the center of a narrow irrigated strip of land, approximately 10 kilometres (6.2 miles) in length, along both sides of the Gila River. Upstream from Gila and the irrigated strip, the river emerges from the large and rugged Gila Wilderness and downstream it enters a crumpled landscape that is mostly uninhabited. The unincorporated community of Cliff is approximately 4 kilometres (2.5 miles) east of Gila.

=== Climate ===
Gila is a BSk (Semi-arid, cold steppe) climate under the Köppen Classification system. Measured by the Trewartha climate classification system the climate is BSak (semi arid steppe, hot summers, cool winters). One half of the average annual precipitation is received in the three months of July, August, and September. April and May are the driest months. Gila has 291 days with sunshine per year compared to an average of 205 days of sunshine for the U.S. as a whole.

Climate data for Gila, New Mexico. Station is 1,488 metres (4,882 ft) above sea level
Month	Jan	Feb	Mar	Apr	May	Jun	Jul	Aug	Sep	Oct	Nov	Dec	Year
Mean daily maximum °C (°F)	13.1 (55.6)	15.5 (59.9)	18.7 (65.7)	23.3 (73.9)	28.2 (82.8)	33.2 (91.8)	33.6 (92.5)	32.0 (89.6)	29.7 (85.5)	24.5 (76.1)	18.1 (64.6)	13.2 (55.8)	23.6 (74.5)
Daily mean °C (°F)	3.6 (38.5)	5.4 (41.7)	8.2 (46.8)	12.1 (53.8)	16.6 (61.9)	21.8 (71.2)	24.2 (75.6)	23.1 (73.6)	19.8 (67.6)	13.9 (57.0)	7.6 (45.7)	3.6 (38.5)	13.3 (55.9)
Mean daily minimum °C (°F)	−6.0 (21.2)	−4.7 (23.5)	−2.3 (27.9)	0.8 (33.4)	5.1 (41.2)	10.3 (50.5)	14.9 (58.8)	14.2 (57.6)	10.1 (50.2)	3.4 (38.1)	−2.9 (26.8)	−6.1 (21.0)	3.1 (37.6)
Average precipitation mm (inches)	26 (1.0)	24 (0.9)	20 (0.8)	9 (0.4)	9 (0.4)	14 (0.6)	69 (2.7)	72 (2.8)	43 (1.7)	32 (1.3)	18 (0.7)	29 (1.1)	365 (14.4)
Source: Weatherbase

== Demographics ==
Historical population
Census	Pop.	Note	%±
2010	314		—
2020	285		−9.2%
U.S. Decennial Census

== Economics and culture ==
Services in Gila include: post office, library, EMT and medical clinic, community center, senior center, library, and several churches. The Gila Valley Library contains 4,052 volumes. The library circulates 6,699 items per year and serves a rural population of 807 persons living in or near Gila and Cliff.

== Transportation ==
=== Major highways ===
Gila can be accessed via NM 211 from US 180 north of Silver City. Also, NM 153 provides access to Turkey Creek.

== See also ==
- List of census-designated places in New Mexico
