= Mule Creek, New Mexico =

- Unincorporated community
- Location within New Mexico Location within the United States
- Coordinates: 33°07′19″N 108°57′22″W
- Country: United States
- State: New Mexico
- County: Grant
- Elevation: 5,233 ft (1,595 m)
- Time zone: UTC-7 (Mountain (MST))
  - Summer (DST): UTC-6 (MDT)
- ZIP code: 88051
- Area code: 575
- GNIS feature ID: 908973

Mule Creek is an unincorporated community in Grant County, New Mexico, United States. Mule Creek is located on New Mexico State Road 78, 46 miles (74 km) northwest of Silver City. Mule Creek has a post office, with the ZIP code 88051.

Mule Creek is the location of Thorshof, the largest freestanding Heathen temple in the United States.
