= Greenlee County Airport =

Airport in Greenlee County, Arizona

- IATA: CFT; ICAO: KCFT; FAA LID: CFT

Summary
- Airport type: Public
- Owner: Greenlee County
- Serves: Clifton/Morenci, Arizona
- Elevation AMSL: 3,798 ft (1,158 m)
- Coordinates: 32°57′25″N 109°12′40″W

Map
- Location within Arizona Location within the United States

Runways
Direction	Length		Surface
Direction	ft	m	Surface
7/25	4,978	1,517	Asphalt

Statistics (2021)
- Aircraft operations (year ending 4/18/2021): 1,350
- Based aircraft: 1
- Source: Federal Aviation Administration

Greenlee County Airport (IATA: CFT, ICAO: KCFT, FAA LID: CFT) is in Greenlee County, 9 miles (7.8 nmi; 14 km) southeast of Clifton and Morenci, Arizona.

The FAA's National Plan of Integrated Airport Systems for 2011–2015 categorized it as a general aviation facility.

== Facilities ==
Greenlee County Airport covers 457 acres (185 ha) at an elevation of 3,798 feet (1,158 m). Its runway, 7/25, is 4,978 by 75 feet (1,517 x 23 m) asphalt.

In the year ending April 18, 2021, the airport had 1,350 aircraft operations, average 26 per week: 82% general aviation, 15% air taxi, and 4% military. One single-engine aircraft was based at the airport.

== See also ==
- List of airports in Arizona
