= Cliff, New Mexico =

- Census-designated place
- Location within New Mexico Location within the United States
- Coordinates: 32°58′00″N 108°37′40″W
- Country: United States
- State: New Mexico
- County: Grant

Area
  - Total: 10.25 sq mi (26.55 km^{2})
  - Land: 10.25 sq mi (26.55 km^{2})
  - Water: 0 sq mi (0.00 km^{2})
- Elevation: 4,567 ft (1,392 m)

Population (2020)
  - Total: 284
  - Density: 28/sq mi (10.7/km^{2})
- Time zone: UTC-7 (MST)
  - Summer (DST): UTC-6 (MDT)
- ZIP code: 88028
- Area code: 575
- FIPS code: 35-17-15860
- GNIS feature ID: 2584078

Cliff is a census-designated place in Grant County, New Mexico, United States. As of the 2020 census, Cliff had a population of 284.

== History ==
Cliff and the nearby town of Gila were settled in 1884, in the Gila River Valley. The area was and is primarily a ranching and farming community. The local Cliff Post Office was established on August 4, 1894.

== Stolen de Kooning painting ==
In 2017, Woman-Ochre, a 1955 painting by Willem de Kooning, which was stolen from the University Of Arizona Museum Of Art in 1985, was found in the home of a recently deceased couple in Cliff.

== Culture ==
The annual Grant County Fair is held annually at the adjoining fairgrounds next to Cliff High School.

== Education ==
Cliff schools are part of the Silver Consolidated School District. The District's main office is located in Silver City.

- Cliff Elementary School (K-6)
  - Students: 124
  - Teachers: 7.7
- Cliff High School (7-12)
  - Students 155
  - Teachers 12.1

== Transportation ==
U.S. Route 180 connects Cliff to Silver City, and NM 211 connects Cliff to Gila.

== Points of interest ==
- Bill Evan's Lake
- Gila Riparian Preserve
- Gila Valley Deli & Bakery

== Demographics ==
Historical population
Census	Pop.	Note	%±
2020	284		—
U.S. Decennial Census
