= Arizona State Route 30 =

Planned state highway in Arizona

State Route 30
- Tres Rios Freeway
- Proposed SR 30 corridor highlighted in red

Route information
- Maintained by ADOT
- Length: 29 mi (47 km)

Major junctions
- West end: SR 85 in Buckeye
- Loop 303 in Goodyear; Loop 202 in Phoenix
- East end: I-17/US-60 in Phoenix

Location
- Country: United States
- State: Arizona
- Counties: Maricopa

Highway system
- Arizona State Highway System; Interstate; US; State; Scenic Proposed; Former
← SR 24	→ I-40
← SR 789	→ SR 802

State Route 30 (SR 30), also known as the Tres Rios Freeway, is a planned freeway in the southwest part of the Phoenix metropolitan area. It is planned as a reliever for Interstate 10 five miles (8 km) to the north and will run through the communities of Buckeye, Goodyear, Avondale, and Phoenix.

In earlier planning stages, the freeway was referred to as State Route 801 (SR 801).

SR 30 will have three segments: a western segment from SR 85 to Loop 303, a central segment from Loop 303 to Loop 202, and an eastern segment from Loop 202 to I-17.

== Route description ==
SR 30 is planned to begin at SR 85 along the Hazen Road alignment, about one mile (1.6 km) south of downtown Buckeye. It will then travel northeast for 10 miles (16 km) before intersecting Loop 303 between Broadway Road and Southern Avenue in Goodyear. SR 30 will then head east for five miles (8 km) before turning southeast at the Agua Fria River and running along the Southern Avenue alignment for 2.5 miles (4.0 km). While along the Southern Avenue alignment, frontage roads will accompany the road to provide access to local communities. SR 30 will then head back northeast for 7 miles (11 km) before intersecting Loop 202 just south of Broadway Road in Phoenix. SR 30 will then continue to travel northeast for 4.5 miles (7.2 km) before meeting its eastern terminus by intersecting the Interstate 17 at the Durango Curve in Phoenix. SR 30 will be 29 miles (47 km) in length when fully complete.

== History ==
A freeway along the planned SR 30 corridor, titled the Buckeye Expressway, was originally proposed in 1957 as the planned route for Interstate 10 into Phoenix. This plan was later abandoned, and I-10 was re-routed northwards along the present Papago Freeway alignment.

In November 2004, Maricopa County voters approved an extension to an existing sales tax funding regional transportation improvements. A significant portion of those funds will go toward improvements of I-10, which experiences significant volumes of traffic in the southwest part of the Valley. However, rapid growth in the neighboring communities of Buckeye, Goodyear, and Avondale is expected to worsen the congestion on I-10, necessitating the construction of a reliever route.

The Arizona Department of Transportation (ADOT) first identified the need for a route along the current SR 30 corridor in June 2005. The route was planned to run parallel 5 miles (8 km) south of I-10 through the cities to provide relief. It would run through largely undeveloped land, reducing the impact on residential communities. Due to the extension of the sales tax in 2004, funds were available to help build SR 30.

In response to a budget shortfall brought on by the Great Recession, the Maricopa Association of Governments (MAG) voted to suspend funding to numerous projects in October 2009, including SR 30. While not removing SR 30 from the long-term regional transportation plan, the removal of the funding would effectively postpone the construction of the route until at least 2026. The plan had originally indicated a construction timeline between 2021 and 2025.

In October 2016, it was announced that ADOT was exploring the possibility of building SR 30 as a toll road to accelerate its construction. It was met with mixed reviews from the public and ultimately not approved. The toll feasibility study took six months.

On October 26, 2017, local mayors officially named SR 30 the Tres Rios Freeway after the nearby Gila, Agua Fria, and Salt rivers.

In May 2019, the central segment alternative was approved. It was chosen after four years of study comparing four different possible alternatives.

== Current status ==
SR 30 is funded through Prop 479, approved by Maricopa County voters in November 2024, which continues the regional half-cent sales tax after Proposition 400 expired at the end of 2025. That proposed extension was placed on the ballot for Maricopa County voters to vote for in the November 2024 election, known as Proposition 479. With the tax extension approved, funding is provided for all three segments.

ADOT is currently in the process of acquiring right-of-way for the central segment. In their 2023–2027 five-year program released in March 2022, ADOT has budgeted funds for this purchase.

Construction of the central segment will begin in 2027, starting with a 4.5-mile (7.2 km) segment from Loop 202 to 97th Avenue. The full central segment, ending with the segment from Estrella Parkway to the Loop 303 is scheduled to start construction in 2033 and is expected to be completed in 2035, with construction of the eastern segment following. There is no timeline for the western segment yet.

In yearly reports of the Freeway Lifecycle Program (FLCP), full detailed budget timelines of the SR-30 project are shown, they often change from year-to-year, and are not considered official until announced on the ADOT website. As of the 2026 Fiscal Year FLCP report, preliminary timelines show the section from 97th Avenue to Dysart Road starting construction in 2029, Dysart Road to Estrella Parkway starting in 2031, and Estrella Parkway to Loop 303 and MC-85 starting in 2033, matching up with a central segment completion in 2035.

Also in the FY FLCP Report, the full eastern segment from Loop 202 to I-17 is listed as one project, with a construction date of 2045. Preliminary "interim freeway improvements" to the western segment from Loop 303 to SR 85 is also listed as one project with a date of 2045. However, it is likely that the western and eastern segment projects are just placeholders, to comply with state legislation requiring that the project be worked on by 2045.

When SR 30 is first constructed, there will be three lanes in each direction. The ultimate configuration allows for four lanes and one high-occupancy vehicle lane (HOV) in each direction.

== Exit list ==
Exit numbers have not yet been assigned. This exit list is based on preliminary studies and may not be the final design plan. Mileposts are determined from the western terminus of the SR 30 project. The entire route is in Maricopa County.

Location	mi	km	Exit	Destinations	Notes
Buckeye	0.00	0.00	–	SR 85	Planned interchange and western terminus
Buckeye	2.10	3.38	–	Miller Road	Planned interchange
Buckeye	4.20	6.76	–	Watson Road	Planned interchange
Buckeye	6.50	10.46	–	Baseline Road	Planned interchange
Buckeye	7.60	12.23	–	Perryville Road	Planned interchange
Goodyear	9.80	15.77	–	Loop 303 north (Bob Stump Memorial Parkway) – Phoenix	Planned interchange; Loop 303 exit 99A-B
Goodyear	11.10	17.86	–	Cotton Lane	Planned interchange with westbound exit and eastbound entrance
Goodyear	12.10	19.47	–	Sarival Avenue	Planned interchange with westbound exit and eastbound entrance
Goodyear	13.10	21.08	–	Estrella Parkway	Planned interchange
Goodyear	14.10	22.69	–	Bullard Avenue	Planned interchange
Avondale	16.20	26.07	–	Dysart Road / El Mirage Road	Planned interchange
Avondale	17.30	27.84	–	Avondale Boulevard	Planned interchange
Avondale	18.30	29.45	–	107th Avenue	Planned interchange
Phoenix	20.40	32.83	–	91st Avenue	Planned interchange
Phoenix	21.45	34.52	–	83rd Avenue	Planned interchange
Phoenix	22.65	36.45	_	75th Avenue	Planned interchange
Phoenix	23.35	37.58	–	67th Avenue	Planned interchange with eastbound exit and westbound entrance
Phoenix	23.80	38.30	–	Loop 202 (Ed Pastor Freeway)	Planned interchange; Loop 202 exit 72B
Phoenix	25.10	40.39	–	51st Avenue	Planned interchange
Phoenix	27.20	43.77	–	35th Avenue	Planned interchange
Phoenix	28.30	45.54	–	Lower Buckeye Road	Planned interchange
Phoenix	29.00	46.67	–	I-17 / US 60 (Black Canyon Freeway) – Flagstaff, Tucson	Planned interchange and eastern terminus
1.000 mi = 1.609 km; 1.000 km = 0.621 mi: Unopened

== See also ==
- Roads and freeways in metropolitan Phoenix
- Arizona State Route 24
- Arizona State Route 202
- Arizona State Route 303
