= Arizona State Route 143 =

Expressway/Freeway in the Phoenix metropolitan area, Arizona, United States

State Route 143
- Hohokam Expressway
- SR 143 highlighted in red

Route information
- Maintained by ADOT
- Length: 3.93 mi (6.32 km)
- Existed: 1957–present

Major junctions
- South end: I-10 / US 60 in Phoenix
- Loop 202 in Phoenix
- North end: McDowell Road in Phoenix

Location
- Country: United States
- State: Arizona
- Counties: Maricopa

Highway system
- Arizona State Highway System; Interstate; US; State; Scenic Proposed; Former
← Loop 101	→ SR 169

Arizona State Route 143, also known as SR 143 and the Hohokam Expressway, is a north–south and access-controlled freeway in Maricopa County, Arizona, that runs from a junction with Interstate 10 at 48th Street in Phoenix to McDowell Road. The only other major junction along the 3.93-mile (6.32 km) route is with Loop 202, which is located one half-mile south of McDowell Road and the northern terminus.

The road lies directly to the east of Phoenix Sky Harbor International Airport. Along with the Sky Harbor Expressway (former SR 153), SR 143's primary purpose is to provide East Valley residents with access to Sky Harbor from westbound Interstate 10 and US 60. This removes the need to travel longer on frequently congested I-10 and avoid the junction with Interstate 17's southern terminus.

== Route description ==
The Hohokam Expressway begins at an intersection with McDowell Road in Phoenix. The freeway continues southward to an ornately designed junction with the Red Mountain portion of Loop 202. Commuters are then allotted access to Sky Harbor International Airport prior to the Salt River crossing.

The southern half of SR 143 begins with the original interchange with University Drive, and then one with Interstate 10 and US 60. After these two interchanges, the freeway ends by transitioning into 48th Street, a surface street.

== History ==
The Hohokam Expressway has a long history and gestation period. The road was first planned in 1957 as SR 143 as part of the 1960 Phoenix Freeway plan as a collector road for traffic from the east side of Phoenix, as well as a proposed eastern exit from Sky Harbor Airport. The present-day interchange with Interstate 10 was for 48th Street, completed in 1967 as part of the original I-10 freeway construction through the southeast sections of the valley such as the Tempe and Chandler suburbs.

The final design was released in 1974, when SR 143 was not yet a freeway, but a parkway with traffic signals and intersections. The design portrayed the new parkway leaving Interstate 10 north along 48th Street corridor, then angling across the Salt River to reach 44th Street where it was planned to end at Washington Street When it opened in 1978, it included the vital eastern access to Sky Harbor Airport, replacing the old 40th Street entrance that was eliminated when 40th Street was demolished to make way for a new airport terminal and runway expansions.

The new parkway rapidly earned a reputation as a constantly congested road, despite having only three traffic signals. As an attempt at decreasing congestion, a grade-separated interchange at University Drive was built in 1985. The bridge was built to handle two lanes of traffic in each direction though without a shoulder or emergency lane.

In 1985, the route was surveyed as part of the new Maricopa Association of Governments 1985 Freeway Plan, and was added to the system with a reroute and upgrade to freeway status. Business Loop I-10 was renamed to SR 143 and was realigned to meet up with the under-construction Loop 202 at 48th Street, as opposed to the old 44th Street alignment. Eventually the route from Sky Harbor Boulevard to Loop 202 was moved onto an entirely new path along the Old Cross Cut Canal right-of-way, roughly paralleling 46th Street beginning at Washington Street Draft plans also included extending the route 2 miles further north along the relatively narrow 48th Street/canal corridor, curving over McDowell Road and ending abruptly at Indian School Road. The route, which is almost entirely residential, met with significant neighborhood opposition and was eventually dropped, although the north-bound exit and south-bound entrance at McDowell Road was retained.

In 2011, the route was updated so drivers departing the east end of Sky Harbor Airport could travel directly onto southbound SR 143 via one of the new ramps. Westbound Loop 202 drivers using the SR 143/Sky Harbor Boulevard exit will have a new elevated ramp to reach southbound SR 143. Many drivers use that route to travel between Loop 202 and Interstate 10. The elevated ramp replaced an older circular ramp that made way for a third new ramp connecting southbound SR 143 to westbound Sky Harbor Boulevard.

In 2024 the bridge over University Drive was expanded to three lanes improving traffic flow. Also, HOV access was added to the southern terminus of State Route 143 to Interstate 10 and US 60.

=== Construction timeline ===
- February 1991: University Drive to Sky Harbor Boulevard
- November 1991: Sky Harbor Boulevard to Washington Street
- February 1992: Washington Street to McDowell Road
- January 2011: Major interchange improvements at Loop 202
- 2021-2024: Interchange improvements as a part of the I-10/Broadway Curve expansion

== Exit list ==
The entire route is in Maricopa County.

Location	mi	km	Exit	Destinations	Notes
Tempe	0.00	0.00		I-10 east (Maricopa Freeway) – Tucson	Southern terminus; I-10 exit 154B
Tempe	0.00	0.00	—	Baseline Road	Southbound exit and northbound entrance
Tempe	0.00	0.00	—	US 60 east (Superstition Freeway)	Southbound exit and northbound entrance; US 60 exit 172B
Phoenix–Tempe line	0.14	0.23	—	I-10 east / US 60 east	HOV exit only; southbound exit and northbound entrance
Phoenix–Tempe line			1	I-10 west / US 60 west / 48th Street – Los Angeles	Southbound exit and northbound entrance; I-10 exit 153; exit includes direct entrance from University Drive
Phoenix–Tempe line	1.01	1.63	2	University Drive	No southbound entrance
Salt River	1.66	2.67	Bridge		
Phoenix	2.01	3.23	3A	Loop 202 east	Northbound exit and southbound entrance via SR 202 Spur; Loop 202 exit 5
Phoenix	2.44	3.93	3B	Sky Harbor	No northbound entrance
Phoenix	2.81	4.52	4	Washington Street	Southbound exit and northbound entrance
Phoenix	3.06– 3.52	4.92– 5.66	5	Loop 202 west to I-10 / SR 51	Loop 202 exit 3
Phoenix	4.04	6.50		McDowell Road	At-grade intersection; northern terminus
1.000 mi = 1.609 km; 1.000 km = 0.621 mi: Incomplete access

== See also ==
- Hohokam
- Sky Harbor International Airport
- List of Arizona State Routes
- Arizona State Route 153 (a highway that used to run immediately parallel to SR 143, carrying some adjacent traffic)
