= Arizona State Route 24 =

State highway in Arizona

State Route 24
- Williams Gateway Freeway
- SR 24 highlighted in red

Route information
- Maintained by ADOT
- Length: 5.48 mi (8.82 km)
- Existed: May 4, 2014–present

Major junctions
- West end: Loop 202 in Mesa
- East end: Ironwood Road in Apache Junction

Location
- Country: United States
- State: Arizona
- Counties: Maricopa, Pinal

Highway system
- Arizona State Highway System; Interstate; US; State; Scenic Proposed; Former
← I-19	SR 24	→ SR 30
← SR 801	SR 802	→ SR 989

State Route 24 (SR 24), also known as the Gateway Freeway or the Williams Gateway Freeway, is a freeway in the extreme southeastern region of the Phoenix Metropolitan Area. The roadway is planned as a controlled-access highway to move traffic from the southeastern suburbs of Phoenix to planned ones in northwestern Pinal County. It is the lowest-numbered state route in Arizona. The first mile from Loop 202 to Ellsworth Road opened on May 4, 2014. An extension to Ironwood Drive opened in 2022, with the completion of "Interim Phase II"; the first mile of this extension from Ellsworth Road to Williams Field Road opened on April 1, 2022, with the remainder following on August 11. Planning for future sections has been halted until studies for the Pinal North-South Freeway are completed to confirm how the two freeways will intersect.

In earlier planning stages, the freeway was formerly labeled State Route 802 (SR 802).

== Route description ==
State Route 24 is a controlled-access highway at the intersection of Loop 202's southern leg (Santan Freeway) and Hawes Road, extending southeast near the Phoenix-Mesa Gateway Airport. The road continues along the Frye Road alignment to the Pinal County line, where it has a diamond interchange with Meridian Road. Shortly after crossing into Pinal County, State Route 24 ends at an intersection with Ironwood Road.

Within Pinal County, State Route 24 is planned to continue further east, intersecting a future north-south freeway under study, and reaching an eastern terminus in the general vicinity of Florence Junction, where US 60 and AZ 79 intersect.

== History ==
=== Freeway origins ===
The first mention of a controlled-access highway facility in the Gateway Freeway area occurred in 2003, when the Maricopa Association of Governments (MAG)'s Southeast Maricopa/Northern Pinal County Area Transportation Study identified a freeway starting at Route 202, passing by the Williams Gateway Airport (now Phoenix-Mesa Gateway Airport), and extending east into Pinal County, having its eastern terminus at Route 60. This new freeway was listed as one of 5 "potential new regional facility (facilities)" that would benefit from right-of-way protection. That same year, the Williams Gateway corridor was identified as a new corridor in Maricopa County's Regional Transportation Plan, with construction for the segment within the county planned in the 2016–2020 timeframe. However, the implementation of the plan was based on the assumption that the ½¢ sales tax dedicated to transportation would be extended past its expiration at the end of 2005.

In November 2004, voters in Maricopa County approved Proposition 400, an extension to the existing sales tax funding transportation improvements. A portion of those funds are earmarked toward improvements of the county's regional freeway system, which experiences significant volumes of traffic in parts of the Phoenix Metropolitan Area. These improvements are made either through expansion of existing freeways, or the development of new freeway corridors. The Maricopa County portion of the Williams Gateway corridor, as a part of the county's Regional Transportation Plan, was included in the list of projects to be funded with the sales tax.

In 2006, the Pinal County Corridors Definition Study took place, further finalizing various freeways in Pinal County, per the request of the state legislature. Of the five freeway corridors identified, the list was trimmed down to three. Funding was also set aside for the environmental studies for these three freeways. Using said funding, MAG identified a preferred alignment for Route 802 within Maricopa County. The alignment travels southeast from Route 202, between the airport and the former General Motors Desert Proving Grounds, until it turns to the east at Frye Road, continuing eastward to the Pinal County line.

In response to a projected budget shortfall of $6.6 billion brought on by the Great Recession, MAG voted to modify its Regional Transportation Plan by suspending funding to numerous projects during a meeting on October 28, 2009. The Williams Gateway Freeway was among the projects affected, since the construction of most of the Maricopa County portion of the route—the alignment between Ellsworth Road and Meridian Road—was deferred to 2026 or later. An interim roadway between the Santan Freeway and Ellsworth Road would still be constructed in the 2016–2020 time period.

In a 2012 map from the unrelated Interstate 11 project, the entirety of the Phoenix Freeway System was shown, including the three unbuilt Pinal County freeways, including the Gateway Freeway, shown as "Future Corridors".

=== Phase I ===
In 2011, the City of Mesa announced it would provide $148 million (2011 USD) to advance construction of the first mile of the freeway, between the Santan Freeway and Ellsworth Road, to provide access to the eastern side of Phoenix-Mesa Gateway Airport. The Arizona State Transportation Board moved construction of the interim facility from fiscal year 2016 to fiscal year 2012, and renumbered the freeway to State Route 24. The interim facility contains a semi-directional T interchange with the Santan Freeway, consisting of four ramps; additional traffic lanes on the Santan Freeway; a half-diamond interchange at Ellsworth Road; and a two-lane roadway mainline connecting the two termini of the roadway.

On March 30, 2012, Mesa officials announced plans to start construction the following Friday near Phoenix-Mesa Gateway Airport. Mesa Mayor Scott Smith and Arizona Department of Transportation Director John Halikowski attended the groundbreaking ceremony. Mesa officials said in a statement that by issuing bonds, the city was able to speed up construction on the project by four years.

=== Phase II ===
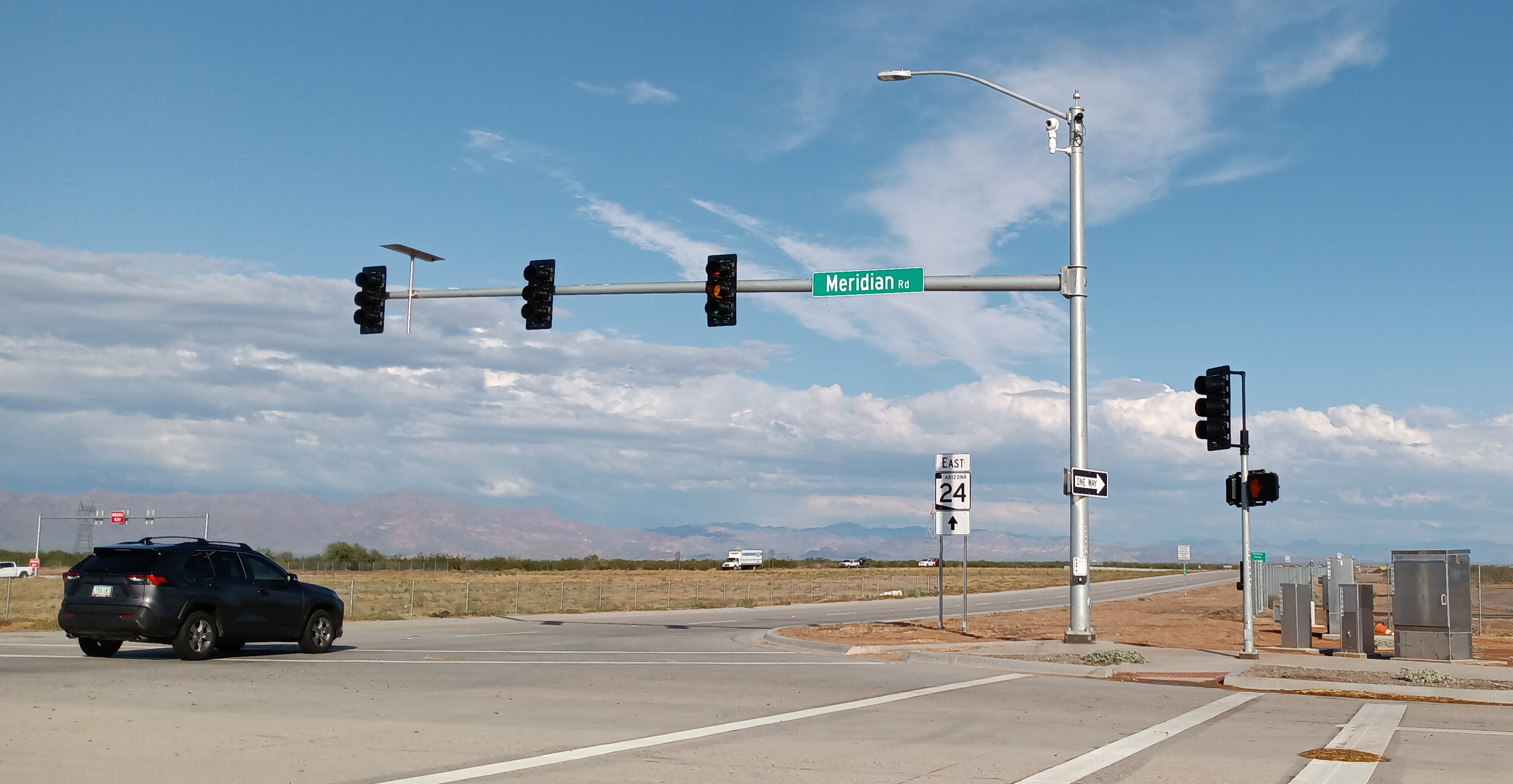
The intersection of Meridian Road and SR 24 in Arizona, prior to the full interchange being built there

Route 24's extension, opened in August 2022, has been labeled as an "interim" phase. This is due to the fact that the freeway lanes will travel on the ramps and service roads at each intersection.

Interim Phase II built two general-purpose lanes in each direction. Ultimately, ADOT plans to have three general-purpose lanes, one auxiliary lane, and one HOV lane in each direction. These updates will coincide with the build-out of the actual interchanges at each new intersection, which are anticipated to be completed during Phase V of MAG's Regional Transportation Plan. Bridges over Ellsworth Road were also added to the plan.

The first mile of Interim Phase II opened on April 1, 2022, from Ellsworth Road to an extended Williams Field Road. This was done in order to provide additional access to and from Bell Bank Park (now known as Arizona Athletic Grounds), a sports complex adjacent to the road. The remainder, to Ironwood Drive, opened on August 11. This stretch includes junctions with Signal Butte Road and Meridian Road, which was extended north from Combs Road to meet SR 24, replacing a rural avenue known as Moeur Road.

=== Further extensions ===
No specific alignment of Route 24 has been set within Pinal County. The study that would determine the preferred alignment for the state route was suspended to allow it to advance in conjunction with the study for the North-South Corridor. However, study maps from the Arizona Department of Transportation show that the freeway's study area in Pinal County runs between the end of the Maricopa County segment and the intersection of U.S. 60 and Arizona 79 in the vicinity of Florence Junction. However, no funds have been identified for the Pinal County segment.

== Exit list ==
County	Location	mi	km	Exit	Destinations	Notes
Maricopa	Mesa	0.00	0.00		Loop 202 (SanTan Freeway)	Exit 34A on Loop 202
Maricopa	Mesa	0.80	1.29	1	Ellsworth Road	Full interchange opened on April 1, 2022
Maricopa	Mesa	1.90	3.06	2	Williams Field Road	At-grade intersection, future interchange
Maricopa	Mesa	3.40	5.47	3	Signal Butte Road	At-grade intersection, future interchange
Maricopa–Pinal county line	Mesa–Apache Junction– Queen Creek tripoint	4.40	7.08	4	Meridian Road	At-grade intersection, future interchange
Pinal	Apache Junction–Queen Creek line	5.48	8.82	5	Ironwood Drive	At-grade intersection, future interchange; current eastern terminus
Pinal	San Tan Valley				Loop 505 (Pinal North-South Freeway)	Planned interchange
Pinal	Gold Canyon				US 60 (Superstition Freeway) – Phoenix, Globe	Planned Interchange; to be US 60 exit 205
1.000 mi = 1.609 km; 1.000 km = 0.621 mi: Proposed

== See also ==
- Metropolitan Phoenix Freeways
- Arizona State Route 30
- Arizona State Route 51
