= Arizona State Route 505 =

Planned freeway in the Phoenix metropolitan area, Arizona, United States

State Route 505
- Pinal North–South Freeway

Route information
- Maintained by ADOT
- Length: 55 mi (89 km)

Major junctions
- South end: I-10 near Eloy
- SR 287 in Coolidge; SR 24 in San Tan Valley
- North end: US 60 in Apache Junction

Location
- Country: United States
- State: Arizona
- Counties: Pinal

Highway system
- Arizona State Highway System; Interstate; US; State; Scenic Proposed; Former
← SR 473	→ SR 564

State Route 505 (SR 505) or Loop 505, also known as the Pinal North–South Freeway, is a planned freeway in the extreme southeastern region of the Phoenix Metropolitan Area currently under study by the Arizona Department of Transportation (ADOT). When constructed, the route will connect Apache Junction, San Tan Valley, Florence, and Eloy, and serve as a Phoenix–Mesa bypass for cities and suburbs in far eastern Maricopa and northwestern Pinal counties, necessitated by extreme population growth in the eastern Phoenix suburbs.

== Route description ==
The exact route of the freeway has yet to be determined, but the corridor currently under study by ADOT has been narrowed down to a 1,500-foot-wide (460 m) corridor, which shows the southern terminus at Interstate 10 (I-10) near Eloy. From I-10, the route will run to the east of SR 87 northward to Coolidge and Florence where it will cross the Gila River just north of an intersection with SR 287 and continuing northwards toward a planned intersection with SR 24 east of Queen Creek. Continuing north, the freeway will serve the rapidly growing suburbs of San Tan Valley and Apache Junction, ultimately ending at its northern terminus in the Apache Junction-Gold Canyon area at an interchange with the Superstition Freeway.

== History ==
=== Initial planning ===
In 2003, the Maricopa Association of Governments (MAG) released the "Southeast Maricopa / Northern Pinal County Area Transportation Study", which was set to identify corridors to build a regional freeway network in Pinal County, which was set to experience massive population growth in the coming decades. Five corridors were identified, the Apache Junction-Coolidge Corridor, a north–south freeway from US 60 at its then planned Gold Canyon realignmen as identified in the US 60 Extension Corridor, to I-10, the Williams Gateway Corridor, an east–west freeway running from Loop 202 to US 60, which is now modern day SR 24, the East Valley Corridor, an east–west freeway from I-10 to the US 60/SR 79 junction, the Price Freeway Connection, a southern extension of Loop 101 to I-10, and the US 60 Extension, an eastern extension of US 60 to SR 79.

In 2006, the Pinal County Corridors Definition Study took place, further finalizing various freeways in Pinal County, per the request of the state legislature. The Loop 101 extension was removed entirely, and the Apache Junction-Coolidge Corridor and the East Valley Corridor, were combined to form the Pinal North-South Corridor. (The Williams Gateway and US 60 Extension Corridors were also finalized in this study.) Funding was also set aside for the environmental studies for these three freeways.

In April 2009, ADOT launched the Pinal North-South Study, an environmental study to further proceed with the freeway's progress, funded by the previously mentioned set-aside funding. That October, in response to a projected budget shortfall of $6.6 billion brought on by the Great Recession, MAG voted to modify its regional transportation plan by suspending funding to numerous projects, including all three of the freeways in Pinal County.

=== Project revival and modern planning ===
In a 2012 map from the unrelated I-11 project, the entirety of the Phoenix freeway system was shown, including the three Pinal County freeways, shown as "Future Corridors".

In 2016, it was announced that the project would be converted into a tiered environmental study approach, with the project slowly being completed over the coming years as funding was made available. The tier 1 Study was started at this time.

In 2017, public comment was opened for the tier 1 study, showing various alternatives for the route. In 2019, the draft tier 1 study was finalized, with the route being narrowed to a 1,500-foot (460 m) corridor. Notably, the finalized route was farther to the east than past proposals, like the one seen in the 2012 map. On August 20, 2021, the tier 1 EIS was officially finalized and approved, and the selected alternative was set to move forward into further study.

In August 2023, ADOT launched the tier 2 study. The corridor was split into two segments, a northern segment (segment 1) and a southern segment (segment 2). When the study is ultimately completed, a 400-foot (120 m) corridor will be selected as the preferred alternative, as well as a DCR and ROD. In-person public meetings were held at this time to get additional data from stakeholders near Segment 1.

In December 2023, ADOT's Route Numbering Committee designated the corridor from US 60 to I-10 as SR 505.

In 2025, public comment was opened for the tier 2 study, first with segment 1, and then later in the year for segment 2. Segment 1 comments were taken from April to June 10, 2025. Three slightly different versions (western, central, eastern) of the route were shown as alternatives, along with the proposed 22 interchange locations. The completed study for the 20-mile (32 km) segment 1 is expected to be completed in 2027, and 2028 for segment 2.

== Current status ==
Timeline of State Route 505 County-wide projects in green Route specific projects in blue Future projects in orange
2003	Southeast Maricopa / Northern Pinal County Area Transportation Study finalized
2004–2005
2006	Pinal County Corridors Definition Study finalized
2007–2008
2009	Pinal North-South Study launched
2009	Funding suspended to project
2010–2011
2012	Preliminary route shown in ADOT map
2013–2015
2016	Tiered environmental approach announced
2016	Tier 1 study launched
2017	Tier 1 public comment opened
2018
2019	Tier 1 draft released
2020
2021	Tier 1 EIS finalized and approved
2022
2023	Route split into 2 segments
2023	Tier 2 study launched
2023	Route designated as SR/Loop 505
2024
2025	Tier 2 segment 1 study public comment opened
2025	Tier 2 segment 2 study public comment opened
2026
2027	Planned finalization of tier 2 segment 1 study
2028	Planned finalization of tier 2 segment 2 study
TBA	Final design
TBA	ROW acquisition
TBA	Construction

ADOT is currently in the tier 2 environmental study phase of the planned Pinal North-South Freeway to serve expected growth in the Pinal County region of the Phoenix Metro area. As opposed to the tier 1 study, which narrows a proposed corridor down to a 1,500-foot (460 m) corridor alignment, the tier 2 study identifies the interchange locations, analyzes impacts to stakeholders, property owners, etc, and further narrows the route to 400-foot (120 m). The tier 2 study of the 55-mile (89 km) segment from Apache Junction to Eloy finished its public comment period and is scheduled to be finalized in 2027 and 2028. This study, building upon the tier 1 study completed in 2021, will produce a record of decision (ROD), and a selected segment alternative. Following completion of the tier 2 study, final design, right-of-way acquisition, and ultimately construction will be needed for the project's completion. This future freeway will connect I-10 around Eloy with the Superstition Freeway (US 60) in Gold Canyon, passing through Coolidge and Florence and intersecting with the planned future alignment of the Gateway Freeway (SR 24).

=== Implications and considerations ===
If built, the corridor could influence land use, growth patterns, and logistics in eastern Maricopa and Pinal County by offering improved access and mobility.

As the route travels undeveloped rural areas, issues such as environmental impacts, property acquisition, and community outreach may be significant.

Given the absence of committed funding and the early stage of design, the timeline for construction is still unknown.

== Exit list ==
Exit numbers have not been assigned yet. Exit list based on tier 2 study for Segments 1 and 2. The entire route is in Pinal County.

Location	mi	km	Exit	Destinations	Notes
Eloy	0.00	0.00	—	I-10 (Pearl Harbor Memorial Highway) – Phoenix, Tucson	Planned interchange and southern terminus
Eloy			—	Houser Road	Planned interchange
Eloy			—	Hanna Road	Planned interchange
Eloy			—	Selma Road	Planned interchange
Casa Grande			—	Steele Road	Planned interchange
Coolidge			—	Kleck Road	Planned interchange
Coolidge			—	Bartlett Road	Planned interchange
Coolidge			—	Martin Road	Planned interchange
Coolidge			—	SR 287 (Florence-Coolidge Highway) – Coolidge, Florence	Planned interchange
Coolidge			Bridge over Gila River		
Florence			—	Hunt Highway	Planned interchange
Florence			—	Arizona Farms Road	Planned interchange
San Tan Valley			—	Judd Road	Planned interchange
San Tan Valley			—	Bella Vista Road	Planned interchange
San Tan Valley			—	Skyline Drive	Planned interchange
San Tan Valley			—	Combs Road / Riggs Road	Planned interchange
San Tan Valley			—	Ocotillo Road	Planned interchange
San Tan Valley			—	Germann Road	Planned interchange
San Tan Valley			—	SR 24 (Gateway Freeway)	Planned interchange
Apache Junction			—	Ray Avenue	Planned interchange
Apache Junction			—	Elliot Avenue	Planned interchange
Apache Junction			—	Houston Avenue to US 60 east – Globe	Planned interchange
Apache Junction	55.00	88.51	—	US 60 west (Superstition Freeway) – Phoenix	Planned interchange and northern terminus
1.000 mi = 1.609 km; 1.000 km = 0.621 mi: Unopened

== See also ==
- Loop 101
- Loop 202
- Loop 303
- Roads and freeways in metropolitan Phoenix
