= U.S. Route 60 in Arizona =

Section of U.S. Highway in Arizona, United States

U.S. Route 60
- US 60 highlighted in red US 60X highlighted in blue

Route information
- Maintained by ADOT
- Length: 369.30 mi (594.33 km)
- Existed: June 8, 1931–present
- Tourist routes: Gila–Pinal Scenic Road; Historic US 80

Major junctions
- West end: I-10 in Brenda
- US 93 at Wickenburg; Loop 303 in Surprise; Loop 101 in Peoria; Northern Parkway in Glendale; I-17 in Phoenix; I-10 from Phoenix to Tempe; Loop 101 in Tempe; Loop 202 in Mesa; US 70 / SR 77 in Globe; US 180 / US 191 near Springerville
- East end: US 60 at the New Mexico state line near Springerville

Location
- Country: United States
- State: Arizona
- Counties: La Paz, Maricopa, Pinal, Gila, Navajo, Apache

Highway system
- United States Numbered Highway System; List; Special; Divided; Arizona State Highway System; Interstate; US; State; Scenic Proposed; Former
| ← SR 51 | US 60 | → SR 61 |
| ← SR 347 | SR 360 | → SR 364 |

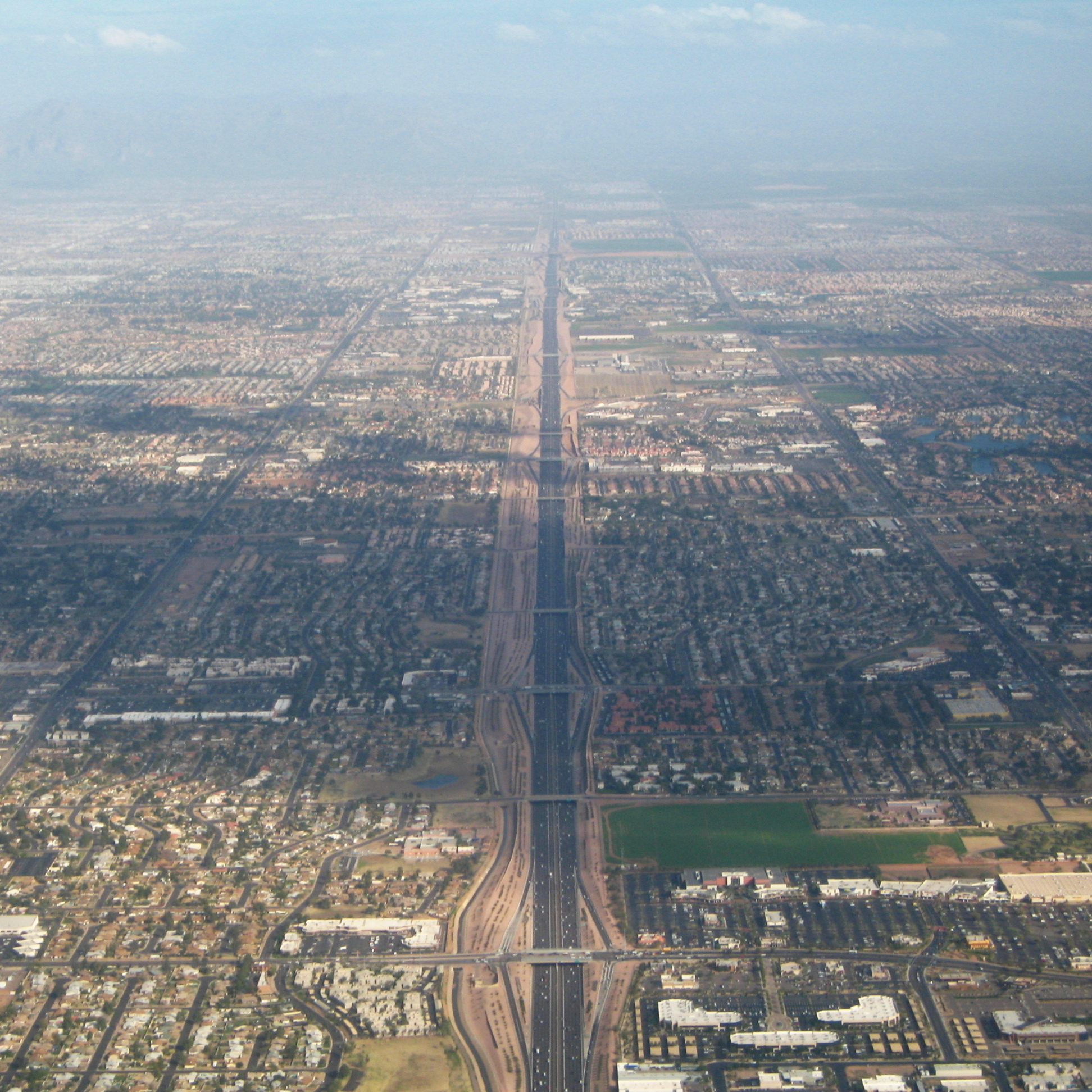
View east along Route 60, Mesa

U.S. Route 60 (US 60) is an east–west United States Highway within Arizona. The highway runs for 369 miles (594 km) from a junction with Interstate 10 near Quartzsite to the New Mexico state line near Springerville. As it crosses the state, US 60 overlaps at various points: I-17, I-10, SR 77, SR 260, US 191, and US 180. Between Wickenburg and Phoenix, the route is known as the Phoenix–Wickenburg Highway. As an arterial inside the Phoenix metropolitan area it is known as Grand Avenue. When concurrent with Interstates through Downtown Phoenix, the route is known as the Black Canyon Highway from Thomas Road and Grand Avenue to the Durango Curve. From the Durango Curve to the Broadway Curve in Tempe, the route is known as the Maricopa Freeway. From Tempe to Apache Junction, it is known as the Superstition Freeway.

== Route description ==
=== I-10 to Wickenburg ===
The western terminus of US 60 is located at an interchange with I-10 near the community of Brenda, east of Quartzsite. It heads northeast from this junction to Vicksburg Junction where it curves towards the east. It continues to the east to Hope where it intersects SR 72. East of Hope, the highway briefly curves towards the north-northeast through the Granite Wash Pass before curving towards the northeast. It continues this direction until it reaches Aguila. The highway heads east to an intersection with SR 71 after passing through Aguila. US 60 continues towards the east until it reaches Wickenburg and an intersection with US 93. From Wickenburg, the highway heads towards the southeast towards Phoenix. It has an intersection with SR 74 in Morristown as it continues towards the southeast.

=== Grand Avenue ===
As US 60 enters the Phoenix metropolitan area, It intersects Loop 303 in Surprise where it becomes Grand Avenue as it continues southeast. It continues to a junction with Loop 101 (Agua Fria Freeway) in Peoria before heading through Glendale. The highway enters the Phoenix city limits and continues towards the southeast until it reaches an interchange with 27th Avenue near Thomas Road.

Improvements to the Grand Avenue portion of US 60, which were included in the Maricopa Association of Governments' 20-year Regional Transportation Plan, have been made. Among such improvements is the reducing of many of the busiest six-legged intersections to four-legged intersections by constructing overpasses, underpasses, and access roads.

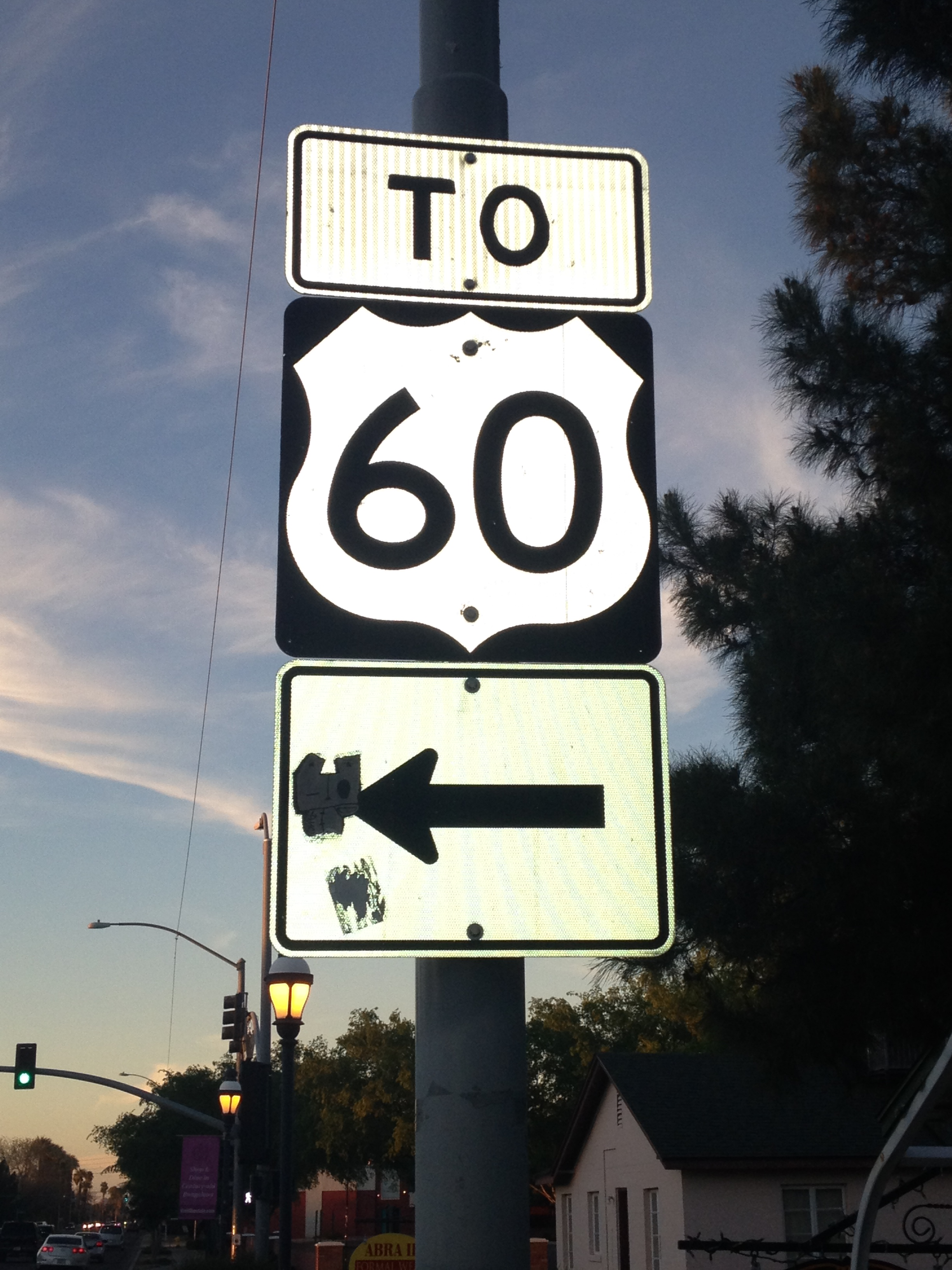
US 60 Marker

=== I-17/I-10 concurrencies ===
After briefly heading south along 27th Avenue, US 60 turns left onto Thomas Road for 1/4 mile (0.40 km) until it reaches I-17. At I-17 the highway begins to run concurrently with I-17 towards the south. It passes through an I-10 interchange known as "The Stack." US 60 continues to run concurrent with I-17 around the Durango Curve and continues east until it again reaches I-10 at the interchange known as "The Split." US 60 begins to run concurrently towards the east with I-10 after the interchange. Along the freeway, US 60 passes along the south side of the airport and over a bridge traversing the Salt River. Once over the river, the freeway continues towards Tempe to an interchange with SR 143. The freeway curves back towards the south following the SR 143 interchange.

=== Superstition Freeway ===
After the curve, I-10 and US 60 part ways in Tempe, with I-10 continuing towards the south and US 60 now heading east along the Superstition Freeway. The freeway continues towards the east to a second interchange with Loop 101 (Price Freeway).

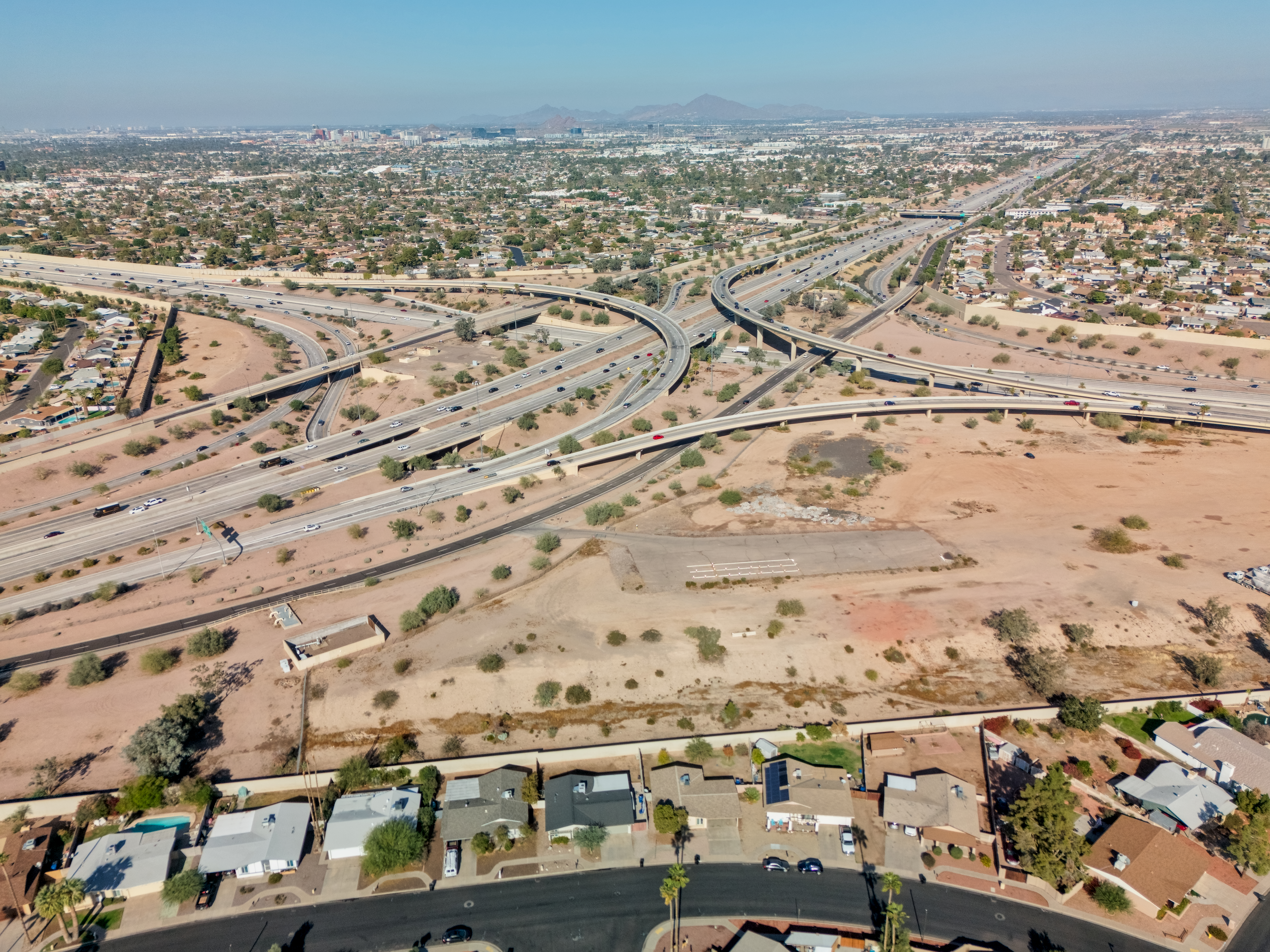
Loop 101 and US 60 interchange in Tempe

The freeway enters Mesa city limits after the interchange as it continues towards the east to the SuperRedTan interchange with Loop 202. The freeway enters the city limits of Apache Junction in Pinal County as it continues eastbound. The freeway portion of the highway ends in Apache Junction as US 60 curves towards the southeast.

=== Apache Junction to the state line ===
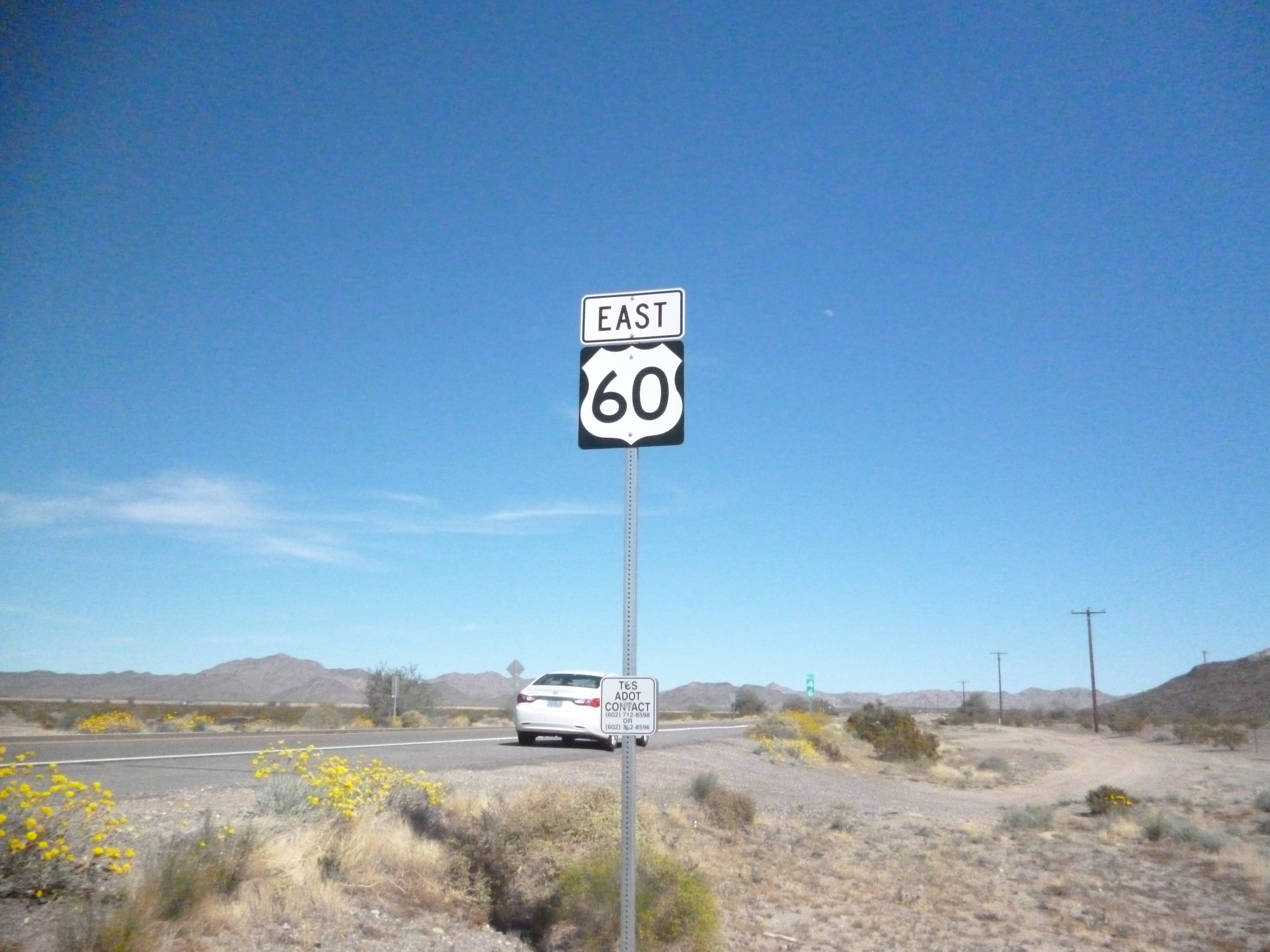
US 60 Marker

The highway continues towards the southeast passing through Gold Canyon to an interchange with SR 79 at Florence Junction. US 60 curves towards the east at this junction as it heads to Superior and an interchange with SR 177. From Superior the highway begins to head towards the northeast to Miami and Claypool. It continues to a junction with SR 188 before passing through Midland City and turning towards the south towards Globe. US 60 curves back towards the east in Globe and continues to an intersection with US 70 and SR 77. US 60 heads northeast from the intersection concurrent with SR 77. The two highways curve towards the north before curving back towards the northeast as they head towards Show Low. As the highway continues towards the northeast it enters the San Carlos Indian Reservation. Within the reservation, the highway goes through a series of hairpin turns as it enters the Salt River Canyon. After descending into the canyon, the highway passes over the Salt River and enters the Fort Apache Indian Reservation. The highway continues towards the northeast and enters Navajo County before reaching an intersection with SR 73. It continues northeast from this intersection to the city of Show Low.

In Show Low, US 60 intersects SR 260 and briefly runs concurrently with SR 260 as it heads northeast through the city. The concurrency with SR 77 also ends in Show Low as SR 77 heads north to Snowflake and US 60 continues towards the east. US 60 leaves the Show Low city limits and heads east to a junction with SR 61 which heads northeast towards Concho. US 60 continues east from this intersection before curving towards the southeast as it heads towards Springerville.

As it enters the Springerville city limits, it intersects and begins to run concurrently with US 180 and US 191. The three highways continue along the same alignment through Springerville, passing over the Little Colorado River. As the three highways continue through the city, they eventually split with US 180 and US 191 heading south towards Alpine and US 60 continuing towards the east. US 60 continues towards the east leaving the Springerville city limits and crossing over the state line into New Mexico.

== History ==
State Route 74
- Location: Ehrenberg to Wickenburg
- Length: 111.20 mi (178.96 km)
- Existed: 1927–1931

State Route 360
- Location: Tempe to Apache Junction
- Length: 26.41 mi (42.50 km)
- Existed: 1970–1992

In 1927, what is now US 60 was signed as or roughly followed by SR 74 between the California border near Ehrenburg and Wickenburg, US 89 from Wickenburg to Florence Junction, US 80 from Phoenix to Florence Junction, US 180 from Florence Junction to Globe and US 70 between Springerville and the New Mexico border. The segment of highway between Springerville and Globe had not been constructed yet. US 60 was extended into Arizona on June 8, 1931, from its original western terminus at US 66 in Springfield, Missouri. While what is now US 60 was under construction between Globe and Springerville, US 60 was temporarily routed down SR 73 as US 60T through San Carlos and McNary. The current route through Show Low was completed sometime between 1935 and 1938. U.S. 60 through Arizona has had far fewer major changes than some other U.S. routes, but one notable example is being replaced by Interstate 10 between Los Angeles, California, and the highway's current terminus near Quartzsite. (The Arizona section of this route was decommissioned in 1982.)

US 60 is now the only U.S. Route to serve Phoenix. US 70 (decommissioned 1969), US 80 (decommissioned 1977) and US 89 (decommissioned 1992) have all been truncated outside of Phoenix. The only other major change was being realigned from an "in-town" route along city arterials through Mesa, Tempe, and Phoenix to the old SR 360 alignment a few miles south and merging with I-10 and I-17 into Downtown Phoenix.

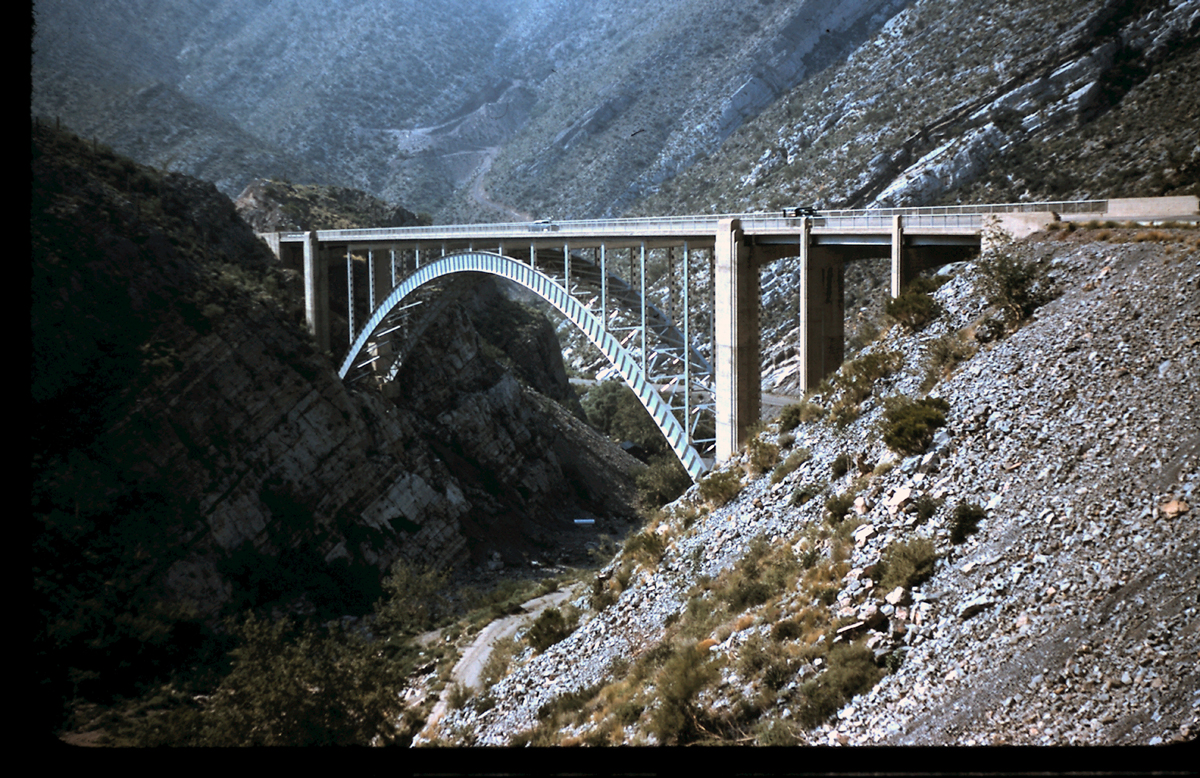
The Pinto Creek Bridge in 1955.

In 1949, the Pinto Creek Bridge won an Annual Award of Merit for being the "most beautiful steel bridge", given by the American Institute of Steel Construction.

In 1952, the Claypool Tunnel was bypassed by the Queen Creek Tunnel to the north, upgrading from a simple “hole in the rock”-type tunnel to a more modern tunnel.

During the 1980s and 90s, plans existed to make Grand an expressway from the Loop 303 to Downtown Phoenix at I-10, I-17, or Van Buren Street, this plan was removed by Fife Symington in 1995.

=== Recent improvements ===
US 60 shield used from 1926 to 1955

In recent years, Arizona Department of Transportation (ADOT) has been working to widen and improve US 60 through the Metropolitan Phoenix area, as it is one of the area's principal freeways. Along the Superstition Freeway segment in the East Valley between I-10 and Loop 202, ADOT has completed its project of adding additional general purpose lanes (five total plus an HOV lane in each direction), adding auxiliary lanes between exits, improving sound barriers, replacing signs, improving lighting conditions, adding rubberized asphalt to reduce noise, adding variable message signs, installing cameras, and adding traffic sensors. A new partial interchange at Meridian Road, along the Maricopa–Pinal county line, opened in October 2015.

Directional colored shields found on US 60 in Arizona during the 1950s.

Along the Grand Avenue segment in Phoenix, ADOT has been widening portions of Grand Avenue in addition to constructing additional overpasses and underpasses at six former six-way intersections to improve traffic flow along US 60 in the Northwest Valley.

ADOT is currently in the study phase of adding additional lanes between Loop 101 and Loop 303 in the far West Valley.

== Future ==
Due to rapid growth in the far eastern Phoenix suburbs within Pinal County and increasing road congestion in the Gold Canyon area, ADOT has begun to study potential freeway-grade realignments of US 60 past the current eastern terminus of the Superstition Freeway in Apache Junction. The new freeway alignment would bypass the existing at-grade section of US 60 through Gold Canyon, and would either rejoin the existing alignment southeast of town (in the vicinity of the Arizona Renaissance Festival grounds) or at the newly constructed freeway-grade junction with SR 79 at Florence Junction.

== Major junctions ==
| County | Location | mi (Note: The mileposts were not renumbered after the western leg was truncated, so they begin at milepost 30.89. Mileposts for US 60 are not logged on overlaps with Interstate highways, except at the junction of I-10 and I-17.) | km | Exit (Note: Only the freeway portion of US 60 east of the I-10 interchange has exit numbers, except for a few exits on the lower section of Grand Avenue, and the interchanges with SR 79 and SR 177. All other segments are standard divided or undivided highways with uncontrolled access.) | Destinations | Notes |
|---|---|---|---|---|---|---|
| La Paz | Brenda | 30.89 | 49.71 | | I-10 – Phoenix, Los Angeles | Exit 31 on I-10; I-10 west is former US 60 / US 70 west |
| La Paz | Hope | 49.55 | 79.74 | | SR 72 west – Parker | Eastern terminus of SR 72 |
| Maricopa | Aguila | 86.07 | 138.52 | | SR 71 north – Prescott | Southern terminus of SR 71 |
| Maricopa | Wickenburg | 110.24 | 177.41 | | Washington Street | Interchange; eastbound exit and westbound entrance |
| Maricopa | Wickenburg | 110.27 | 177.46 | | Museum, Parking | Interchange; westbound exit and eastbound entrance; serves Sigler Western Museum |
| Maricopa | Wickenburg | 110.33 | 177.56 | | US 93 north – Kingman, Las Vegas | Roundabout; southern terminus of US 93 |
| Maricopa | Morristown | 120.11 | 193.30 | | SR 74 east to I-17 | Western terminus of SR 74 |
| Maricopa | Sun City West | 138.48 | 222.86 | | Loop 303 (Bob Stump Memorial Parkway) | Exit 119 on Loop 303 |
| Maricopa | Surprise | 142.75 | 229.73 | | Bell Road | Interchange; left exits and entrances |
| Maricopa | Peoria | 148.90 | 239.63 | | Loop 101 south (Agua Fria Freeway) | Exit 11 on Loop 101 |
| Maricopa | Peoria | 149.23 | 240.16 | | To Loop 101 north – Glendale | Access via 91st Avenue; exit 11 on Loop 101 |
| Maricopa | Peoria | 151.97 | 244.57 | | Olive Avenue / 75th Avenue | Interchange with Olive Avenue; at-grade intersection with 75th Avenue |
| Maricopa | Glendale | 153.35 | 246.79 | | 67th Avenue / Northern Avenue | Interchange with 67th Avenue; at-grade intersection with Northern Avenue; future Northern Parkway west |
| Maricopa | Glendale | 154.74 | 249.03 | | Tunnel underneath intersection of 59th Avenue / Glendale Avenue (Marty Robbins Boulevard) | |
| Maricopa | Glendale | 155.41 | 250.11 | | 55th Avenue north to Maryland Avenue | Interchange; westbound exit and entrance |
| Maricopa | Glendale | 156.21 | 251.40 | | 51st Avenue / Bethany Home Road | Interchange with 51st Avenue; at-grade intersection with Bethany Home Road |
| Maricopa | Glendale–Phoenix line | 157.40– 157.59 | 253.31– 253.62 | 157 | 43rd Avenue / Camelback Road | Interchange; 43rd Avenue is former SR 69 |
| Maricopa | Phoenix | 159.01 | 255.90 | | Indian School Road / 35th Avenue | |
| Maricopa | Phoenix | 160.09 | 257.64 | 160 | 27th Avenue to Thomas Road | Currently an interchange for US 60X; US 60 is to be moved onto planned HOV-only interchange; will be eastbound exit and westbound entrance off of US 60 once new alignment is completed |
| Maricopa | Phoenix | 160.09 | 257.64 | | Grand Avenue southeast – Downtown Phoenix | Interchange; left exit eastbound; left entrance westbound; US 60 (east) splits from Grand Avenue, which becomes unsigned US 60X east; currently exit 160 on US 60X; former US 60 / US 70 east / US 89 / SR 93 south; to be western end of I-17 concurrency once HOV-only direct ramps to I-17 are completed |
| Maricopa | Phoenix | 201.945 (Note: Mileposts reflect I-17 mileage markers) | 324.999 | | I-17 north (Black Canyon Freeway north) – Flagstaff | Western end of I-17 concurrency; exit 201 on I-17 |
| Maricopa | Phoenix | 200.885 | 323.293 | 200B | McDowell Road / Van Buren Street | Exit numbers follow I-17; no signage for Van Buren Street westbound |
| Maricopa | Phoenix | 200.589 | 322.817 | 200A | I-10 – Central Phoenix, Los Angeles | Exit 143 on I-10 |
| Maricopa | Phoenix | 199.706 | 321.396 | 199B | Adams Street / Van Buren Street | Westbound exit and entrance only |
| Maricopa | Phoenix | 199.555 | 321.153 | 199B | Jefferson Street | Eastbound exit only |
| Maricopa | Phoenix | 199.165 | 320.525 | 199A | Grant Street / Buckeye Road (Historic US 80) | No westbound signage for Buckeye Road |
| Maricopa | Phoenix | 198.843 | 320.007 | 198 | Buckeye Road (Historic US 80) | Westbound exit only |
| Maricopa | Phoenix | 197.943 | 318.558 | 197 | Durango Street / 19th Avenue | No westbound signage for Durango Street |
| Maricopa | Phoenix | | | | SR 30 west (Tres Rios Freeway) | Planned interchange at Durango Curve |
| Maricopa | Phoenix | | | South end of Black Canyon Freeway; West end of Maricopa Freeway | | |
| Maricopa | Phoenix | 196.938 | 316.941 | 196 | 7th Avenue / Central Avenue | No westbound signage for Central Avenue |
| Maricopa | Phoenix | 195.935 | 315.327 | 195B | 7th Street / Central Avenue | No eastbound signage for Central Avenue |
| Maricopa | Phoenix | 194.920 | 313.693 | 195A | 16th Street | Eastbound exit and westbound entrance |
| Maricopa | Phoenix | 168.28 | 270.82 | 194 | I-17 ends / I-10 west (Inner Loop) – Los Angeles, Sky Harbor | Southern terminus of I-17; no exit number westbound; eastern end of I-17 concurrency, western end of I-10 concurrency; I-10 exits 150 (east) & 150A (west) |
| Maricopa | Phoenix | 149.94 (Note: Mileposts reflect I-10 mileage markers) | 241.31 | 150B | 24th Street | Exit numbers follow I-10; westbound exit and eastbound entrance |
| Maricopa | Phoenix | 150.77 | 242.64 | Salt River bridge | | |
| Maricopa | Phoenix | 151.50 | 243.82 | 151 | University Drive / 32nd Street | |
| Maricopa | Phoenix | 152.39 | 245.25 | 152 | 40th Street | Westbound access via exit 172B |
| Maricopa | Phoenix–Tempe line | 153.38 | 246.84 | 153 | SR 143 north (Hohokam Expressway) / Broadway Road / 48th Street | Eastbound exit and westbound entrance; exit 1 on SR 143; entrance includes direct entrance ramp from Univeristy Dr.; serves Phoenix Sky Harbor International Airport |
| Maricopa | Tempe | | | — | SR 143 north | HOV interchange; westbound exit and eastbound entrance; serves Phoenix Sky Harbor International Airport |
| Maricopa | Tempe | 171.63 | 276.21 | — | I-10 east (Maricopa Freeway east) – Tucson | Eastern end of I-10 concurrency; eastbound left exit and westbound left entrance; exit 154 on I-10 |
| Maricopa | Tempe | 171.63 | 276.21 | Western end of Superstition Freeway (former SR 360) | | |
| Maricopa | Tempe | 171.63 | 276.21 | 172B | SR 143 north (Hohokam Expressway) / Broadway Road / 52nd Street / 40th Street | Westbound exit and eastbound entrance; exit 154B on I-10; serves Phoenix Sky Harbor International Airport; exit ramp onto SR 143 includes direct exit to University Drive |
| Maricopa | Tempe | 171.63 | 276.21 | — | I-10 east (Maricopa Freeway east) – Tucson | Westbound left exit and eastbound entrance; includes direct access to/from Baseline Road; exit 154A on I-10 |
| Maricopa | Tempe | 172.52 | 277.64 | 172A | Priest Drive | Westbound exit and eastbound entrance |
| Maricopa | Tempe | 173.67 | 279.49 | 173 | Mill Avenue | |
| Maricopa | Tempe | 174.42 | 280.70 | 174 | Rural Road | |
| Maricopa | Tempe | 175.41 | 282.30 | 175 | McClintock Drive | |
| Maricopa | Tempe | 176.44– 176.47 | 283.95– 284.00 | 176A | Loop 101 south (Price Freeway) | Exits 55A-B on Loop 101 |
| Maricopa | Tempe–Mesa line | 176.44– 176.47 | 283.95– 284.00 | 176B | Loop 101 north (Price Freeway) | Exits 55A-B on Loop 101 |
| Maricopa | Tempe–Mesa line | 177.43 | 285.55 | 177 | Dobson Road | |
| Maricopa | Mesa | 178.41 | 287.12 | 178 | Alma School Road | |
| Maricopa | Mesa | 179.41 | 288.73 | 179 | SR 87 (Country Club Drive) – Chandler | |
| Maricopa | Mesa | 180.36 | 290.26 | 180 | Mesa Drive | |
| Maricopa | Mesa | 181.41 | 291.95 | 181 | Stapley Drive | |
| Maricopa | Mesa | 182.40 | 293.54 | 182 | Gilbert Road | |
| Maricopa | Mesa | 184.39 | 296.75 | 184 | Val Vista Drive | |
| Maricopa | Mesa | 185.39 | 298.36 | 185 | Greenfield Road | |
| Maricopa | Mesa | 186.38 | 299.95 | 186 | Higley Road | |
| Maricopa | Mesa | 187.87 | 302.35 | 187 | Superstition Springs Boulevard | Eastbound exit and westbound entrance |
| Maricopa | Mesa | 188.38 | 303.17 | 188 | Power Road | |
| Maricopa | Mesa | 189.38 | 304.78 | 189 | Sossaman Road | Eastbound exit and westbound entrance |
| Maricopa | Mesa | 190.42– 190.60 | 306.45– 306.74 | 190 | Loop 202 | SuperRedTan Interchange; signed as exits 190A (north) and 190B (south) eastbound; exits 30A-B on Loop 202 |
| Maricopa | Mesa | 191.39 | 308.01 | 191 | Ellsworth Road | |
| Maricopa | Mesa | 192.39 | 309.62 | 192 | Crismon Road | |
| Maricopa | Mesa | 193.40 | 311.25 | 193 | Signal Butte Road | |
| Maricopa–Pinal county line | Mesa–Apache Junction line | 194.41 | 312.87 | 194 | Meridian Road | Eastbound exit and westbound entrance |
| Pinal | Apache Junction | 195.41 | 314.48 | 195 | Ironwood Drive | |
| Pinal | Apache Junction | 196.41 | 316.09 | 196 | SR 88 east (Idaho Road) | |
| Pinal | Apache Junction | 197.41 | 317.70 | 197 | Tomahawk Road | |
| Pinal | Apache Junction | 198.41 | 319.31 | 198 | Goldfield Road (Historic US 80) | Western end of Historic US 80 concurrency |
| Pinal | Apache Junction | 199.17 | 320.53 | 199 | Old West Highway (Historic US 80 west) | Westbound exit only; former US 60 / US 70 / US 80 west / US 89 north |
| Pinal | Apache Junction | 199.44 | 320.97 | | Mountain View Road | Eastern end of Superstition Freeway (former SR 360); traffic light westbound |
| Pinal | Apache Junction | | | 200 | Loop 505 south (Pinal North–South Freeway) | Planned interchange |
| Pinal | Gold Canyon | | | 205 | SR 24 west (Williams Gateway Freeway) | Planned interchange |
| Pinal | Florence Junction | 212.27 | 341.62 | 212 | Historic US 80 east / SR 79 – Florence, Tucson | Interchange; eastern end of Historic US 80 concurrency; former US 80 / US 89 |
| Pinal | Superior | 226.87 | 365.11 | 227 | SR 177 south – Kearny, Winkelman | Interchange; northern terminus of SR 177 |
| Gila | Globe | 247.04 | 397.57 | | SR 188 north (Apache Trail) – Roosevelt | Southern terminus of SR 188; former SR 88 west |
| Gila | Globe | 250.76 | 403.56 | | Maple Street | Interchange via connector road |
| Gila | Globe | 252.05 | 405.64 | | US 70 east / SR 77 south (Ash Street east) – Safford, Winkelman | Western end of SR 77 concurrency; western terminus of US 70 |
| Navajo | | 318.14 | 512.00 | | SR 73 east | Western terminus of SR 73 |
| Navajo | Show Low | 339.72 | 546.73 | | SR 260 west (Clark Road) – Heber-Overgaard | Western end of SR 260 concurrency |
| Navajo | Show Low | 341.69 | 549.90 | | SR 260 east (White Mountain Road) – Pinetop-Lakeside, Springerville | Eastern end of SR 260 concurrency |
| Navajo | Show Low | 342.25 | 550.80 | | SR 77 north (Penrod Road) – Holbrook | Eastern end of SR 77 concurrency |
| Apache | Bell | 353.16 | 568.36 | | SR 61 north – St. Johns | Southern terminus of SR 61 |
| Apache | Springerville | 384.45 | 618.71 | | US 180 west / US 191 north – St. Johns | Western end of US 180/US 191 concurrency |
| Apache | Springerville | 387.83 | 624.15 | | Mountain Avenue to SR 260 – Eagar | Serves White Mountain Regional Medical Center |
| Apache | Springerville | 388.69 | 625.54 | | US 180 east / US 191 south – Alpine | Eastern end of US 180/US 191 concurrency |
| Apache | | 401.97 | 646.91 | | US 60 east – Socorro | Continuation into New Mexico |
1.000 mi = 1.609 km; 1.000 km = 0.621 mi: Concurrency terminus; HOV only; Incomplete access; Route transition; Unopened

== Related route ==
U.S. Route 60X
- Location: Phoenix, Arizona
- Length: 1.47 mi (2.37 km)
- Existed: 1992–present

U.S. Route 60X(1)
- Location: Mesa, Arizona
- Length: 5.99 mi (9.64 km)
- Existed: 1992–present

An unsigned U.S. Route 60X is also listed by ADOT and is divided into two discontinuous segments, both of which are located within Maricopa County in the Phoenix area. Both sections of US 60X were portions of the pre-freeway alignment of US 60 between Apache Junction and central Phoenix.

US 60X begins near Grand Avenue and Thomas Road at exit 160, where US 60 leaves Grand Avenue for Thomas Road. It then follows Grand Avenue southeast over I-17/US 60, terminating at an intersection with 18th Avenue and Willetta Street.

The eastern segment of US 60X picks up at Sossaman Road, traveling east across Main Street/Apache Trail, crossing Loop 202 and Ellsworth Road before terminating at Meridian Drive, at the Pinal County line.

=== Major intersections ===
The eastern segment of US 60X has posted mile markers that likely correspond to the former alignment of US 60.

==== Western section ====
The entire route is in Phoenix, Maricopa County.

| mi | km | Exit | Destinations | Notes |
|---|---|---|---|---|
| 0.000 | 0.000 | | Grand Avenue northwest (US 60 west) | Continuation beyond western terminus of US 60X |
| 0.000 | 0.000 | 160 | 27th Avenue (US 60 east) to Thomas Road | Interchange; westbound exit and eastbound entrance |
| 0.000 | 0.000 | | Grand Avenue northwest (US 60 west) | Future western terminus of US 60X following construction of HOV-only direct ramps between I-17 and US 60 |
| 0.56 | 0.90 | | 24th Drive to I-17 north | Right-in/right-out interchange; westbound exit and entrance only |
| 1.31 | 2.11 | | McDowell Road / 19th Avenue to I-10 east | Access to I-10 via 19th Avenue south |
| 1.47 | 2.37 | | 18th Avenue / Willetta Street | Eastern terminus of US 60X; road continues southeast as Grand Avenue |
1.000 mi = 1.609 km; 1.000 km = 0.621 mi: Proposed; Incomplete access

==== Eastern section ====
The entire route is in Mesa, Maricopa County.

| mi | km | Destinations | Notes |
|---|---|---|---|
| 189.01 | 304.18 | Main Street west (Historic US 80 west) / Sossaman Road | Western terminus of US 60X(1); west end of Historic US 80 concurrency; road continues as Main Street (Historic US 80) |
| 190.71– 190.79 | 306.92– 307.05 | Loop 202 (Red Mountain Freeway) | Loop 202 exits 27 (south) and 28 (north) |
| 194.00 | 312.21 | Apache Trail (Historic US 80 east) / Meridian Drive | Eastern terminus of US 60X(1); east end of Historic US 80 concurrency; road continues into Pinal County as Apache Trail (Historic US 80) |
1.000 mi = 1.609 km; 1.000 km = 0.621 mi: Concurrency terminus

== See also ==
- SuperRedTan Interchange
- Superstition Mountains
- Roads and freeways in metropolitan Phoenix

U.S. Route 60
| Previous state: Terminus | Arizona | Next state: New Mexico |
