= Northern Parkway =

The following roads are called Northern Parkway:

- Northern Parkway (Baltimore)
- Northern Parkway (Maryland suburbs), unbuilt road north from Washington, D.C.
- Northern State Parkway on Long Island, New York
- Northern Parkway (Arizona)
