= Williams Gateway =

Williams Gateway may refer to:

- Phoenix Mesa Gateway Airport, which was formerly named Williams Gateway Airport
- Williams Gateway Freeway, a proposed freeway in Metropolitan Phoenix
