= Northern Parkway (Arizona) =

Road/unnumbered state highway in Maricopa County

- Northern Avenue
- Northern Parkway highlighted in red, proposed corridor in blue

Route information
- Maintained by MCDOT and the cities of El Mirage, Peoria, and Glendale
- Length: 6.0 mi (9.7 km) 6.5 mi (10.46 km) for the entire Northern Parkway corridor (Northern Avenue from the Agua Fria River to US 60)
- Existed: 2013–present
- History: Partially complete

Major junctions
- West end: Loop 303 in Glendale
- Loop 101 in Peoria
- East end: US 60 in Glendale

Location
- Country: United States
- State: Arizona

Highway system
- Roads in Maricopa County

Northern Parkway is a limited-access road in Maricopa County, Arizona that serves the west part of the Phoenix metropolitan area. Northern Parkway was first opened in December 2013. Northern Parkway ends at the Agua Fria River, with corridor improvements to Northern Avenue set to extend to the US 60.

== Route description ==
Northern Parkway begins at a trumpet interchange with Loop 303. The parkway heads east for three miles, passing through interchanges at Sarival Avenue, Reems Road, and Litchfield Road. After passing Litchfield Road, it turns southeast and proceeds along the Northern Avenue corridor. Northern Parkway then passes through the Dysart and El Mirage Roads interchanges where frontage roads accompany the parkway for this one-mile segment. East of El Mirage Road, Northern Parkway crosses the Agua Fria River where it ends. Northern Parkway's corridor extends along Northern Avenue heading east from the Agua Fria River to US 60 (Grand Avenue).

== History ==
Plans to build a limited-access road along the Northern Avenue corridor date back to 2001 when the City of Glendale found a need for a major east-west corridor between Loop 101 and Loop 303. In 2003, the Northern Parkway concept was included in Maricopa Association of Governments (MAG) regional transportation plan (RTP). A year later, residents of Maricopa County voted to extend the regional half-cent sales tax for transportation. As part of this initiative, a number of major arterial road projects were funded including Northern Parkway.

In 2008, Maricopa County along with the cities of Glendale, El Mirage, and Peoria approved a design concept report for the project. Roughly 70% of the project's funding will come from the federal funds allocated by MAG while the remainder coming from the four local agencies. Over $315 million has been programmed for Northern Parkway from MAG, roughly half of the projected total cost of the whole project at $615 million.

=== Phase 1 ===
Construction on Phase 1, the four-mile segment between Loop 303 and Dysart Road began in March 2012 and was opened in December 2013. Construction of the overpasses at Reems and Litchfield Roads began in summer 2014 and was completed in January 2015. With the completion of those interchanges, this four-mile segment was converted to freeway standards.

The project stalled from 2015–2019 as Maricopa County saw less growth in this region than expected because of the Great Recession.

=== Phase 2 ===
Construction resumed in early 2019 on Phase 2, the segment between Dysart Road and 111th Avenue. It consisted of constructing the frontage roads between Dysart and El Mirage Roads and building a new bridge above the Agua Fria River. This part was complete in August 2020. The second part of this project was to construct overpasses at Dysart and El Mirage Roads as well as build the parkway between those two roads. Construction began in June 2021 and was completed in September 2022.

== Future ==
=== Phase 3 ===
Construction on Phase 3, the segment between 11th Avenue and 103rd Avenue, began in February 2026. No grade-separated interchanges will be built in this segment due to residential communities with Traffic signals at 115th, 11th, 107th, and 103rd Avenues. The project consists of rebuilding and restriping the existing roadway, adding new turn lanes at various intersections, and general aesthetic roadway improvements. Due to inflationary pressures, the original design of widening the Northern Avenue corridor to three lanes in each direction with a median and right-in/right-out intersections was not chosen. The project is expected to be complete in early 2027.

=== Phase 4 ===
The segment between 103rd and 91st Avenues may be taken over by the Arizona Department of Transportation (ADOT), as Northern Avenue intersects Loop 101. The roadway will be widened to four lanes in each direction along with a new diverging diamond interchange (DDI) with the Loop 101. There will also be no grade-separated interchanges in this segment until Loop 101, and existing traffic signals will also be reconfigured in this section. Construction of this segment is scheduled to start in late 2026.

=== Phase 5 ===
The segment between 91st and Grand Avenues will be widened to three lanes in each direction. There will also be no grade-separated interchanges in this segment until Grand Avenue. The design is yet to be finalized, but existing traffic signals will be at the major intersections and other access points may be limited to right-in/right-out movements. A two-way flyover ramp will be constructed at Grand Avenue to move uninterrupted traffic from westbound Northern Avenue to southeast Grand Avenue and vice versa. This will be the final part of the Northern Parkway corridor project, there is currently no timeline for construction of Phase 5, but a scoping assessment was completed in 2020.

When complete, the Northern Parkway corridor will be 12.5 miles (20.1 km) in length, stretching from Loop 303 to US 60. Northern Parkway will run as an access-controlled freeway for the six-mile segment from Loop 303 through the Agua Fria River. Between the Agua Fria River and US 60, Northern Avenue will be an enhanced arterial street with lights at major intersections, and partial interchanges at freeway junctions.

== Major Intersections ==
The entire route is in Maricopa County.

Location	mi	km	Exit	Destinations	Notes
Glendale	0.00	0.00	—	Loop 303 (Bob Stump Memorial Parkway)	Trumpet interchange; western terminus; exit 110B on Loop 303
Glendale	0.10	0.16	1	Sarival Avenue	Westbound exit and eastbound entrance
Glendale	1.10	1.77	2	Reems Road	
Glendale	3.10	4.99	3	Litchfield Road	
El Mirage–Glendale line	4.20	6.76	4	Dysart Road	
El Mirage–Glendale line	5.20	8.37	5	El Mirage Road	
Agua Fria River	5.60	9.01	Bridge; eastern end of freeway (continuation east beyond this point is Northern Avenue)		
Peoria–Glendale line	7.20	11.59		107th Avenue	At-grade intersection
Peoria–Glendale line	8.20	13.20		99th Avenue	At-grade intersection
Peoria–Glendale line	8.50	13.68		Loop 101 (Agua Fria Freeway)	Access via the current Northern Avenue diamond interchange; exit 8 on Loop 101; planned diverging diamond interchange (DDI) with construction to begin in 2026
Peoria–Glendale line	9.20	14.81		91st Avenue	At-grade intersection
Peoria–Glendale line	10.20	16.42		83rd Avenue	At-grade intersection
Peoria–Glendale line	11.20	18.02		75th Avenue	At-grade intersection
Glendale	12.20	19.63		US 60 (Grand Avenue) / 67th Avenue	At-grade intersection; planned partial interchange
1.000 mi = 1.609 km; 1.000 km = 0.621 mi: Incomplete access
