= Arizona State Route 564 =

State highway in Arizona, United States

State Route 564

Route information
- Maintained by ADOT
- Length: 9.16 mi (14.74 km)
- Existed: 1970–present

Major junctions
- South end: US 160
- North end: Near Navajo National Monument

Location
- Country: United States
- State: Arizona

Highway system
- Arizona State Highway System; Interstate; US; State; Scenic Proposed; Former
← Loop 505	→ SR 587

State Route 564, also known as SR 564, is a state highway in northern Arizona serving Navajo National Monument. This highway travels from U.S. Route 160 to Betatakin Ruin; SR 564 derives its number from the former route number of the adjacent stretch of US 160, U.S. Route 164. SR 564 ends at Betatakin; smaller roads travel beyond to Keet Seel.

== Route description ==
SR 564 is a 9.16-mile (14.74 km) highway in northern Arizona that connects the Navajo National Monument with US 160. The southern terminus is located at an intersection with US 160 and BIA Route 41, a road maintained by the Bureau of Indian Affairs (BIA). SR 564 heads generally north from this intersection as it heads towards the Navajo National Monument. Just prior to reaching its northern terminus, the highway intersects BIA Route 221. It leaves this intersection as it comes to an end at the monument.

== History ==
SR 564 was designated as an access road to the Navajo National Monument in 1970. The highway received this specific designation as a result of being the fifth spur route of SR 64. SR 64 would later be redesignated as US 160, but SR 564 would retain its designation.

== Junction list ==
The entire route is in Navajo County.

Location	mi	km	Destinations	Notes
	0.00	0.00	US 160	Southern terminus; road continues as BIA Route 41
	9.16	14.74	Navajo National Monument	Northern terminus
1.000 mi = 1.609 km; 1.000 km = 0.621 mi
