= Arizona State Route 303 =

State highway in Arizona, United States

State Route 303
- Bob Stump Memorial Parkway
- Loop 303 highlighted in red

Route information
- Maintained by ADOT
- Length: 35.25 mi (56.73 km)
- Existed: 1991–present

Major junctions
- South end: MC 85 in Goodyear (Under Construction) Van Buren Street in Goodyear
- I-10 in Goodyear; Northern Parkway in Glendale; US 60 (Grand Avenue) in Surprise
- North end: I-17 in Phoenix

Location
- Country: United States
- State: Arizona

Highway system
- Arizona State Highway System; Interstate; US; State; Scenic Proposed; Former
← SR 289	→ SR 347

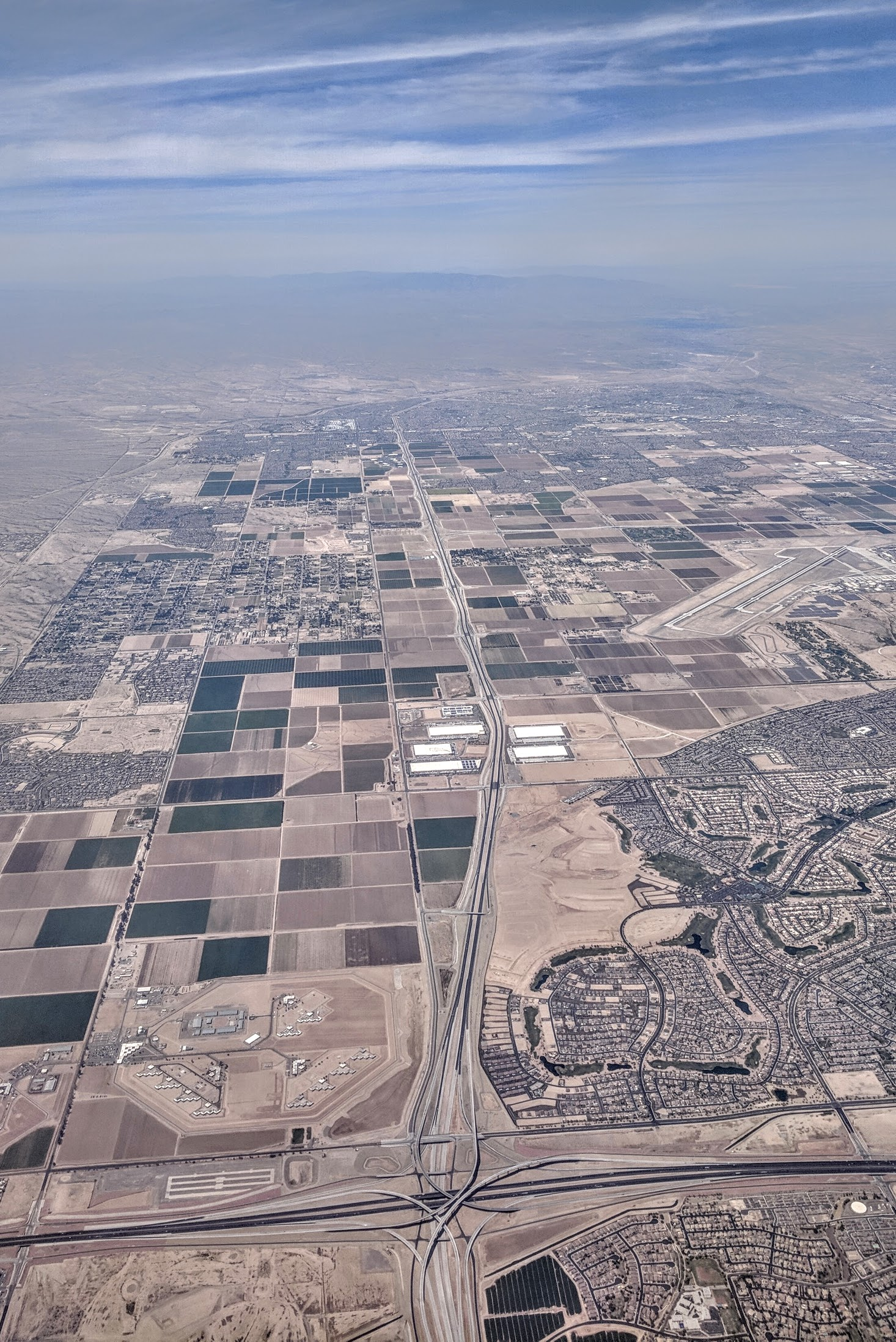
Loop 303/I-10 interchange

Arizona State Route 303 (SR 303) or Loop 303, also known as the Bob Stump Memorial Parkway (formerly the Estrella Freeway), is a freeway that serves the west part of the Phoenix metropolitan area. The freeway, originally a two-lane rural highway, was maintained by Maricopa County until 2004 after approved sales tax when the Arizona Department of Transportation again took control of upgrading the interim road to a freeway.

== Route description ==
Loop 303 currently begins at Van Buren Street, one mile south of I-10 in Goodyear. It becomes a six-lane freeway with a stack interchange at I-10. South of Van Buren Street it continues as Cotton Lane but without a route number. The freeway heads north under McDowell and Thomas Roads, then over an interchange with Indian School Road. It then proceeds through a farmland terrain and passes by the Wildlife World Zoo near the Northern Parkway trumpet interchange. After passing Northern Parkway, the freeway continues for a few miles before entering a residential community at Greenway Road and turning northeast. It passes above Grand Avenue (US 60) and a BNSF railroad line at a parclo interchange. The freeway turns eastward north of Sun City West before turning north again at the Happy Valley Parkway interchange. It turns east again south of Lake Pleasant at the Agua Fria River. Following the Lake Pleasant Parkway interchange, the freeway condenses down to four lanes and passes by the TSMC manufacturing plant. The freeway comes to an end at a temporary at-grade interchange (eventually to be a freeway-to-freeway interchange) with I-17 near Skunk Creek. East of this interchange, Loop 303 becomes Sonoran Desert Drive. The southern portion between US 60 to I-10 is used to bypass Grand Avenue, and the whole route is used to bypass the Phoenix Metropolitan Area.

== History ==
=== 1985–1995 ===
Old colored Arizona Loop 303 shield that has been phased out.

Loop 303 was originally a part of the 1985 Maricopa County Regional Transportation Plan that was funded by a sales tax approved by Maricopa County voters. The freeway, designed to serve the Northwest Valley, was originally designated SR 517 in 1985; the Loop 303 designation was first assigned on December 18, 1987. The interim two-lane highway was completed between US 60 and I-10 in 1991, marking the first road along the Loop 303 corridor. The freeway was scheduled to be completed sometime by 2005. However, funding shortfalls and increasing construction costs forced cutbacks in the plan, and in 1995 the freeway was dropped from the regional plans.

=== 1995–2004 ===
Maricopa County took charge of SR 303 when it was dropped from the regional freeway plans in 1995, maintaining the interim two-lane highway along the original corridor while keeping the state route designation. The county then made significant improvements to the highway, extending it from US 60 to Happy Valley Parkway in 2004 as a four-lane divided parkway. SR 303 was still largely a two-lane rural road and the only sections as a four-lane divided parkway was the extension north of US 60, and the southern terminus just north of I-10 between Indian School and McDowell Roads. The segment between US 60 and Bell Road in Surprise was partially upgraded to freeway standards in 2004 with overpasses at Clearview Boulevard and Mountain View Boulevard. An interim interchange and bridge above US 60 were also built at the same time. In May 2004, SR 303 was renamed the "Bob Stump Memorial Parkway" in honor of former Arizona congressman Bob Stump.

=== 2004–2011 ===
With the extension of the sales tax approved in 2004, SR 303 was taken back over by the Arizona Department of Transportation (ADOT) and added back to the regional transportation plan. As Maricopa County had completed much of the required study and preparation work, construction on the freeway proceeded from the I-10 to I-17 segment. According to an agreement between the state legislature and ADOT, Statewide Transportation Acceleration Needs (STAN) funds were used to build a partial interchange at Bell Road in summer 2010, several years before previously intended. Funds from this were also used to upgrade the crossings at Waddell and Cactus Roads to make way for the new freeway.

In 2009, construction began on the 14-mile segment between Happy Valley Parkway and I-17. In May 2011, this segment opened as a four-lane freeway with interchanges at Happy Valley Parkway, Lone Mountain Parkway (not opened until 2012), and Lake Pleasant Parkway. Motorists still have to pass through signaled ramp junctions at I-17 until a full freeway-to-freeway interchange is built.

=== 2011–2019 ===
Beginning in mid-2011, ADOT began upgrading Loop 303 between US 60 and I-10 from a two-lane highway to a six-lane freeway with auxiliary lanes and interchanges. In August 2011, construction began on the six-mile segment between Mountain View Boulevard and Peoria Avenue. This segment was completed in fall 2013 with interchanges at Bell, Greenway, Waddell, and Cactus Roads as well as Peoria Avenue.

In November 2011, construction began on the north half of the I-10 and Loop 303 stack interchange. Construction was completed in August 2014 with the opening of all of the north half ramps. The McDowell Road bridge was also completed during this time.

In May 2012, construction began on the seven-mile segment between Peoria Avenue and Thomas Road. This segment was fully completed in August 2014 with a trumpet interchange at Northern Parkway (opened in late 2013) along with other interchanges at every arterial road except Olive Avenue.

In August 2014, construction began on the seven-mile segment between US 60 and Happy Valley Parkway to upgrade it to freeway standards. The first part was to upgrade the roadway to three lanes in each direction; it was complete in summer 2015. The second part was to construct a partial cloverleaf interchange at the US 60. This part began in December 2014 and was complete in spring 2016. The final part was to construct the El Mirage Road interchange. This began in February 2015 and was complete in summer 2016. This marked the first time the entire Loop 303 between I-10 and I-17 was fully upgraded to freeway standards.

In February 2016, construction began on the south half of the I-10 and Loop 303 stack interchange. Construction was complete in October 2017 with the opening of all of the south half ramps along with the Van Buran Street interchange.

=== 2020–present ===
In December 2020, construction began to widen the six-mile segment between Happy Valley Parkway and Lake Pleasant Parkway from two to three lanes in each direction. It was completed with the opening of the Jomax Parkway exit in Peoria in January 2022.

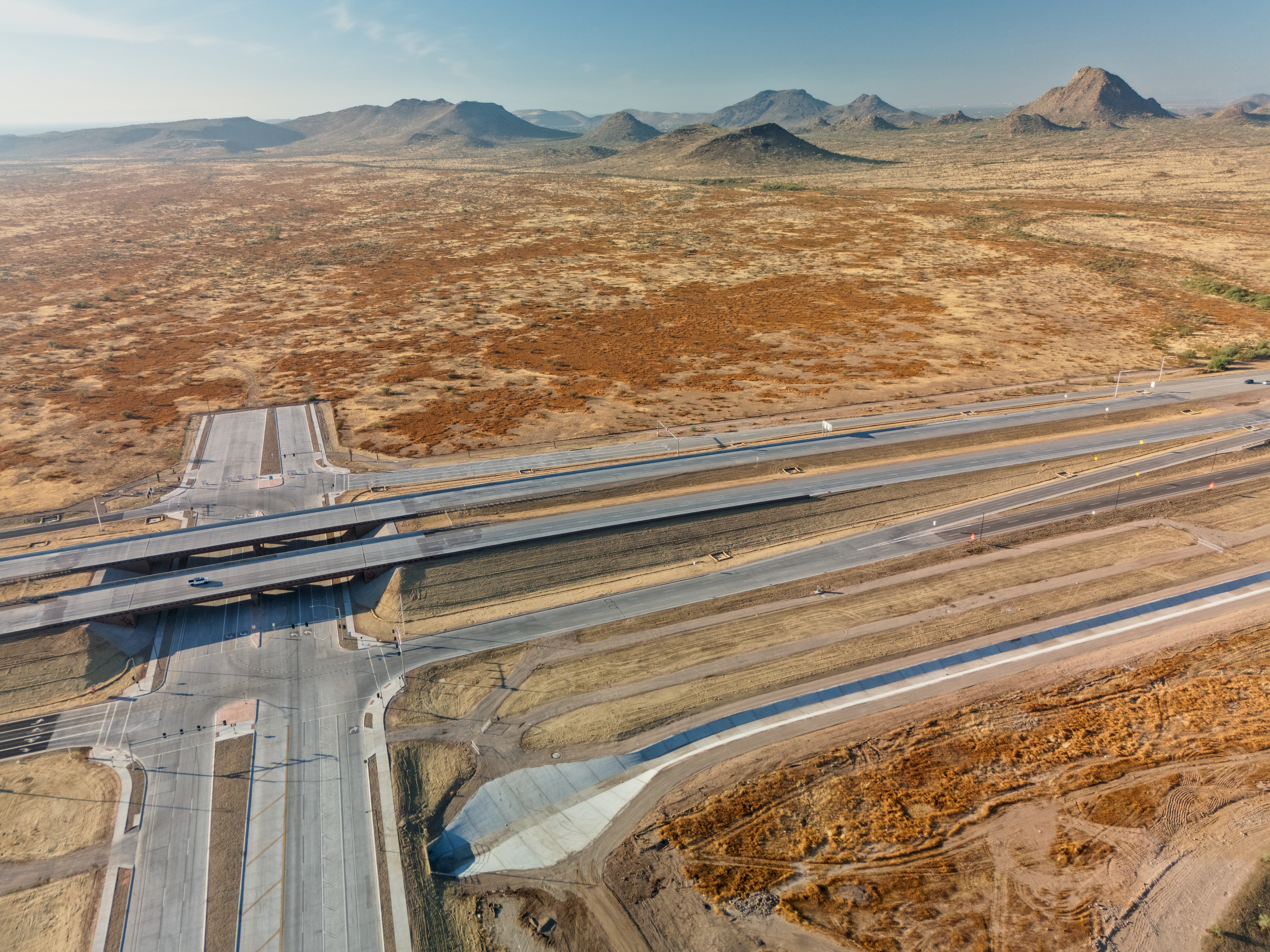
Interchange at 43rd Avenue

In September 2022, construction began to build the interchanges at 51st Avenue and 43rd Avenue. Construction was completed with the opening of these interchanges in September 2023.

In January 2026, construction began to build a full freeway-to-freeway interchange with direct flyover ramps to the I-17. The project will also widen the freeway from two to three lanes in each direction for the seven-mile segment from Lake Pleasant Parkway to the I-17. Construction is expected to be completed in summer 2028.

In June 2026, construction began to build a new four-mile segment of Loop 303 from Van Buran Street to MC 85. Interchanges will be constructed at Yuma Road, Lower Buckeye Road, and Elwood Street/Cotton Lane. Three lanes will be constructed in each direction for this stretch along with frontages roads to provide access to local streets. Following Elwood Street, two lanes will be constructed in each direction before the freeway comes to an end at an at-grade intersection with MC 85. Construction is expected to be completed in summer 2030.

== Future ==
Construction is expected to begin in 2028 to build a new interchange at 155th Avenue.

Construction is expected to begin in 2033 to have Loop 303 fly over MC 85 to its new southern terminus at an interchange with SR 30. Construction of that interchange will be around the same time as that portion of SR 30.

Loop 303 has been built to accommodate four-general purpose lanes, one HOV lane, and one auxiliary lane in order to expand in the future.

Long-term plans include additional new interchanges at Olive Avenue, 96th Avenue, and 67th Avenue to serve rapid growth and development in the far west valley, as well as an extension to continue south of SR 30 to the future I-11 Hassayampa Freeway. Most of this extension would be in Goodyear and would be built around the same time as that portion of I-11.

== Exit list ==
Exit numbering is arbitrary. The entire route is in Maricopa County.

Location	mi	km	Exit	Destinations	Notes
Goodyear	99.00	159.33	99A-B	SR 30 (Tres Rios Freeway)	Planned flyover interchange with construction set to begin in 2033; Loop 303 may go south of SR 30 in the future
Goodyear	99.5	160.1		MC 85	At-grade intersection currently under construction with the project set to be completed in summer 2030; future southern terminus
Goodyear	100.50	161.74	100	Elwood Street / Cotton Lane	Interchange currently under construction with the project set to be completed in summer 2030; to be southbound exit and northbound entrance
Goodyear	101	163	101	Lower Buckeye Road	Interchange currently under construction with the project set to be completed in summer 2030; to be northbound exit and southbound entrance
Goodyear	102	164	102	Yuma Road/Lower Buckeye Road	Interchange currently under construction with the project set to be completed in summer 2030; no northbound signage for Lower Buckeye Road
Goodyear	103.10	165.92	103	Van Buren Street / McDowell Road	Current southern terminus; northbound exit and southbound entrance
Goodyear	103.90	167.21	104	I-10 – Phoenix, Los Angeles	Stack interchange; signed as exits 104A (east) and 104B (west); exit 124 on I-10
Goodyear	105.20	169.30	105	Thomas Road / McDowell Road	Southbound exit and northbound entrance
Goodyear	106.10	170.75	106	Indian School Road	
Goodyear–Glendale line	107.20	172.52	107	Camelback Road	
Glendale	108.10	173.97	108	Bethany Home Road	
Glendale	109.10	175.58	109	Glendale Avenue	
Glendale	110.10	177.19	110A	Northern Avenue	Northbound exit and southbound entrance
Glendale	110.60	177.99	110B	Northern Parkway east	Trumpet interchange; west end of Northern Parkway
Glendale	111.50	179.44	111	Olive Avenue	Planned interchange; to be southbound exit and northbound entrance
Glendale–Surprise line	112.10	180.41	112	Peoria Avenue	
Surprise	113	182	113	Cactus Road	
Surprise	114	183	114	Waddell Road	
Surprise	115	185	115	Greenway Road	
Surprise	116	187	116	Bell Road	
Surprise	119	192	119	US 60 (Grand Avenue)	Parclo interchange
Surprise	120.45	193.85	120	155th Avenue	Planned interchange with construction set to begin in 2028
Sun City West	123	198	123	El Mirage Road	
	125	201	125	Happy Valley Parkway / Vistancia Boulevard	Happy Valley Parkway was routing of Temporary Loop 303 before parkway's maintenance was turned over to Maricopa County
Peoria	126	203	126	Jomax Parkway	
Peoria	127	204	127	Lone Mountain Parkway	
Peoria	130	210	130	96th Avenue	Planned interchange
Peoria	131	211	131	Lake Pleasant Parkway	
Phoenix	133	214	133	67th Avenue	Planned interchange
Phoenix	136	219	136	51st Avenue	
Phoenix	137	220	137	43rd Avenue	
Phoenix	137.50	221.28	138C	I-17 south	Planned HOV interchange
Phoenix	138	222	138A-B	I-17 – Flagstaff, Phoenix	Flyover interchange currently under construction with the project set to be completed in summer 2028; to be signed as 138A (north) and 138B (south); I-17 exit to be signed as 221
Phoenix	139	224		I-17 – Phoenix, Flagstaff Sonoran Desert Drive	Northern terminus; temporary, at grade intersection with I-17; continues east as Sonoran Desert Drive
1.000 mi = 1.609 km; 1.000 km = 0.621 mi: Incomplete access; Unopened

== See also ==
- Roads and freeways in metropolitan Phoenix
- Loop 101
- Loop 202
- Loop 505
