= Arizona State Route 410 =

Planned freeway in the Phoenix metropolitan area, Arizona, United States

State Route 410
- Sonoran Corridor

Route information
- Maintained by ADOT
- Length: 20 mi (32 km)

Major junctions
- West end: I-19 in Sahuarita
- East end: I-10 in Tucson

Location
- Country: United States
- State: Arizona
- Counties: Pima

Highway system
- Arizona State Highway System; Interstate; US; State; Scenic Proposed; Former
← Loop 404	→ SR 464

State Route 410 (SR 410), also known as the Sonoran Corridor, is a planned freeway in Tucson, Arizona currently under study by the Arizona Department of Transportation (ADOT). When constructed, the freeway will run south of Tucson International Airport, and be the fourth limited access road in the city, and the first true inter-city freeway built in Tucson.

== Route description ==
The route will run from land in suburban northern Sahuarita,

== Exit list ==
The entire route is in Pima County.

Location	mi	km	Exit	Destinations	Notes
Sahuarita	0.00	0.00	-	I-19 (Nogales–Tucson Highway) – Tucson, Nogales	Planned interchange and western terminus
Tucson			-	Sahuarita Road	Planned interchange, serves Tucson International Airport
Tucson			-	Old Vail Road	Planned interchange
Tucson			-	Wilmot Road	Planned interchange
Tucson	20.00	32.19	-	Rita Road I-10 (Pearl Harbor Memorial Highway) – Tucson, El Paso	Planned interchange and eastern terminus
1.000 mi = 1.609 km; 1.000 km = 0.621 mi: Unopened
