= Arizona State Route 177 =

State highway in Arizona, United States

State Route 177
- SR 177 highlighted in red

Route information
- Maintained by ADOT
- Length: 31.69 mi (51.00 km)
- Existed: 1953–present
- Tourist routes: Copper Corridor Scenic Road

Major junctions
- South end: SR 77 in Winkelman
- North end: US 60 in Superior

Location
- Country: United States
- State: Arizona

Highway system
- Arizona State Highway System; Interstate; US; State; Scenic Proposed; Former
← SR 176	→ SR 179

State Route 177 or SR 177 runs in a north–south direction from Superior, Arizona to Winkelman, Arizona. It ends at two junctions, US 60 to the north and SR 77 to the south. The southern half of this road runs alongside the Gila River and the Copper Basin Railroad.

The road passes through or near the towns of Kelvin, Riverside, Kearny and Hayden. This road passes by the copper mines in eastern Pinal County.

It is a spur road of SR 77.

== Route description ==
The southern terminus of SR 177 is located at an intersection with SR 77 in Winkelman. The highway heads northwest from Winkelman, passing through Hayden. From Hayden, SR 177 heads towards the west-northwest before curving towards the northwest as it approaches the city limits of Kearny. It continues towards the northwest from Kearny passing near Kelvin and Sonora. The highway continues heading northwest until it begins to near Superior, where it curves towards the north. SR 177 reaches its northern terminus at an interchange with US 60 in Superior.

== Junction list ==
County	Location	mi	km	Destinations	Notes
Gila	Winkelman	0.00	0.00	SR 77 – Globe, Tucson	Southern terminus; road continues east as Cobb Lane
Pinal	Superior	31.69	51.00	US 60 – Phoenix, Globe	Interchange; northern terminus; exit 227 on US 60; road continues as Magma Avenue
1.000 mi = 1.609 km; 1.000 km = 0.621 mi
