= List of state routes in Arizona =

Arizona State Highway System
- Example signage from the Arizona State Highway System
- State Routes highlighted in red Special routes highlighted in blue

System information
- Maintained by ADOT and local jurisdictions
- Length: 3,189.12 mi (5,132.39 km) _{Length represents Arizona State Routes and Interstate Business Routes}
- Formed: September 9, 1927

Highway names
- Interstates: Interstate X (I-X)
- US Highways: U.S. Route X (US X)
- State: State Route X (SR X)

System links
- Arizona State Highway System; Interstate; US; State; Scenic Proposed; Former

The U.S. state of Arizona's State Routes are usually abbreviated as SR.

== History ==
The Arizona State Highway system was introduced on September 9, 1927, by the State Highway Commission (formed on August 11 of the same year). It incorporated the new federal aid system and also the U.S. Highway system. The 1927 plan included 27 state routes, most of which were simply dirt roads. Until 1942, the state route marker signs contained a Native American swastika that were used by Navajos, but were removed after the U.S.'s entry into World War II against Nazi Germany which had a reversed swastika as its emblem and became strongly negatively associated with the Nazis.

The modern system was introduced and adopted in the 1950s.

Historical state route markers

1927–1941

1941–1956

1956–1960

1960–1963 (northbound)

1960–1963 (eastbound)

1960–1963 (southbound)

1960–1963 (westbound)

1963–1973

1973–1978

1978–1991

1991 to present

== Designations and nomenclatures ==
The Arizona Department of Transportation (ADOT) internally recognizes Interstate Highways, U.S. Highways and Arizona Highways as all being separate types of highway designations. State highways within Arizona are referred to as Arizona State Routes or State Routes, with the prefix "SR" being used for abbreviations. ADOT also recognizes seven different types of suffixed routes for the U.S. Highways and State Routes. The recognized suffixes consist of the following with "(Number)" filling in for a numeric designation:

- Alternate (A) – Referred to as "State Route (Number)A" and abbreviated as "SR (Number)A".
- Business Route (B) – Referred to as "State Business Route (Number)" and abbreviated as "SR (Number)B" or "SR (Number) Bus.".
- Loop Route (L) – Referred to as "State Loop Route (Number)" and abbreviated as "SR (Number)L". Despite often having "Loop" within their titles, SR 101, SR 202 and SR 303 are not considered "Loop Routes" by ADOT, nor are Interstate Business Loops. To date, SR 89L has been the only Loop Route recognized by ADOT.
- Spur (S) – Referred to as "State Route (Number) Spur" and abbreviated as "SR (Number)S" or "SR (Number) Spur".
- Truck (T) – Referred to as "State Route (Number) Truck" and abbreviated as "SR (Number) Truck".
- Temporary (X) – Publicly referred to as "State Route (Number) Temporary" or "State Route (Number)T" and abbreviated "SR (Number)T". Internally referred to as "State Route (Number)X" and abbreviated "SR (Number)X".
- Wye Leg (Y) – Referred to as "State Route (Number)Y" and abbreviated "SR (Number)Y".

U.S. Highways can also use the same suffixes listed above. Usually the suffixed routes are recognized by ADOT as U.S. Highways. For example, the Alternate route of U.S. Route 89 (US 89) is referred to as U.S. Route 89A (US 89A) instead of State Route 89A (SR 89A). The only exception to this rule is SR 93X, which is a suffixed route of US 93. Suffixed routes for Interstates are a different story. Although the suffixed routes are signed with Interstate green Business shields, they are recognized by ADOT as suffixed State Routes. In the field, Interstate 10 business routes are signed as Interstate 10 Business Loop or Interstate 10 Business Spur, while they are referred to by ADOT as "State Business Route 10" (SR 10B) and "State Route 10 Spur" (SR 10 Spur). The same principle applies with business routes for all other Interstates in Arizona.

Designations listed under Highway Logs and GIS data however, use the Arizona Transportation Information System (ATIS) nomenclature. The ATIS designation for a non-suffixed state route is "S (Number)". The number at the end is always three digits long. As such, all two digit routes are referred to under the ATIS terminology as "S 0(Number)". SR 260 and SR 79 are known under ATIS nomenclature as "S 260" and "S 079" respectively. U.S. Highways replace the prefix "S" used by State Routes under the ATIS nomenclature with "U" while Interstate Highways use the prefix "I". Suffixed routes under ATIS always have the internally applied suffix between the prefix. State Business Route 79 under ATIS nomenclature is referred to as "SB079" and SR 93X is "SX093".

== Numbering system ==
=== The System ===
The numbering system for the state routes, with exceptions, prefers using numbers 60-99 for the routes, except when taken by an applicable US Route. Freeway state route numbers are hand-picked numbers below 60, with 24, 30, 50, and 51, being the chosen numbers. Loop freeways (Loop 101, Loop 202, Loop 303) follow a predictable (X0X) pattern, increasing both in the order of when they were constructed and distance from the city's center. Freeways near Phoenix Sky Harbor Airport were given the numbers of 143 and 153.

=== History and Exceptions ===
In 1927, when the system was created, the first ten state routes were added, in conjunction with the already existing US Routes. Six of these routes (73, 82, 83, 84, 87 and 88) still exist today. As the system grew and expanded throughout the decades, more and more routes were added. A notable development came in 1932, when the first 3 digit spur route was added, State Route 287, a spur of Route 87. As the system continued to grow and evolve, some routes were decommissioned, and their numbers were re-used for future highways, as due to the limitations, limited numbers were available. As US routes began being decommissioned due to the rise of the Interstate Highway System, old alignments were often added to the state route system, keeping the number of the old US Highway, as a state route, all falling in the 60-99 range. As the system started to run out of numbers, more and more spur routes began being added to the system, which sometimes did not connect to their true parent, but rather, "in the vicinity" of the route. In 1974, the last 60-99 number was added to the system, State Route 98. The passage of Proposition 300 brought proper freeways to the valley, spelling the end of the state route system, since as mentioned above, state route freeways follow their own numbering rules, and State Route 143 in 1985 marked the first non-spur route to fall outside of the 60-99 system. The true end of the system occurred one year later, when State Route 238 (a non-freeway) was added, given the number seemingly at random, rather than "94" as proposed. Since 98 was added in 1974, all routes added to the system have either been freeways, spurs, small three-digit stubs, or de-commissioned US routes. Since the program's inception in 1927, all numbers between 60 and 99 were used by at least one State or US Route, aside from 94.

== State routes ==
Number	Length (mi)	Length (km)	Southern or western terminus	Northern or eastern terminus	Formed	Removed	Notes
SR 24	5.48	8.82	Loop 202 in Mesa	Ironwood Road in Queen Creek/Apache Junction	2014	current	
SR 30	—	—	Loop 303 in Goodyear	Loop 202 in Phoenix	proposed	—	Proposed I-10 reliever
SR 50	—	—	Loop 101 in Glendale	Loop 101 in Scottsdale	1987	1994	Former SR 317
SR 51	16.70	26.88	I-10 / Loop 202 in Phoenix	Loop 101 in Phoenix	1987	current	
SR 61	76.51	123.13	US 60 near Show Low	NM 53 near Zuni Pueblo	1935	current	
SR 62	3.50	5.63	US 93 north of Kingman	Chloride	1936	1971	
SR 63	22.80	36.69	Petrified Forest National Park	US 260	1932	1951	
SR 63	136.64	219.90	US 66 in Sanders	US 160 near Mexican Water	1961	1981	
SR 64	108.31	174.31	I-40 in Williams	US 89 near Cameron	1932	current	
SR 64 Spur	0.36	0.58	SR 64/US 180 near Tusayan	Grand Canyon National Park Airport	1974	1999	Connected SR 64 to Grand Canyon Airport
SR 65	139.06	223.80	SR 87 in Payson	SR 264 in Second Mesa	1936	1967	Now part of SR 87
SR 66	66.59	107.17	I-40 in Kingman	Coconino-Yavapai county line	1984	current	ADOT signs eastern terminus at I-40 near Seligman
SR 67	43.40	69.85	Bright Angel Point near North Rim	US 89A near Jacob Lake	1941	current	
SR 68	27.88	44.87	SR 95 in Bullhead City	US 93 near Kingman	1941	current	
SR 69	33.87	54.51	I-17 near Cordes Lakes	SR 89 in Prescott	1936	current	Formerly extended to Phoenix but was replaced by I-17
SR 69T	3.02	4.86	SR 87/SR 93 in Mesa	South Price Road and Baseline Road in Tempe	1955	1979	Formerly extended to US 60 in Phoenix but was replaced by I-17, I-10 and SR 360
SR 71	—	—	US 180 near Safford	US 60 in Eagar	1927	1936	Redesignated as part of US 666 (later US 191)
SR 71	24.16	38.88	US 60 near Aguila	SR 89 near Congress	1936	current	
SR 72	36.74	59.13	SR 95 near Parker	US 60 in Hope	1930	current	
SR 73	46.79	75.30	US 60 near Show Low	SR 260 near Pinetop	1927	current	
SR 74	111.20	178.96	Ehrenberg	Wickenburg	1927	1931	Became part of US 60
SR 74	31.02	49.92	US 60 near Morristown	I-17 in Phoenix	1964	current	an earlier one existed from 1927-1932
SR 75	19.39	31.21	US 70 in Duncan	US 191 / SR 78 near Clifton	1932	current	
SR 76	11.16	17.96	Benson; Peppersauce Wash	Pomerene; SR 77	1962	1988	Was never completed between Benson and SR 77
SR 77	238.71	384.17	I-10 in Tucson	BIA Route 6 at the Navajo Nation boundary	1930	current	
SR 78	19.50	31.38	US 191 / SR 75 in Three Way	NM 78 at the Arizona-New Mexico state line	1959	current	
SR 79	85.30	137.28	US 89 in Prescott	US 66 / US 89 in Flagstaff	1927	1941	Redesignated as US 89A
SR 79	1.51	2.43	I-17 in Flagstaff	US 89A/BL 40 in Flagstaff	1950	1993	Replaced by I-17 and SR 89A
SR 79	58.40	93.99	SR 77 near Tucson	US 60 near Gold Canyon	1992	current	older routes existed 1934-1941 and 1950-1968
SR 79 Bus.	2.05	3.30	SR 79 near Florence	SR 79 in Florence	1992	current	
SR 80	120.23	193.49	I-10 BL near Benson	NM 80 near Animas	1989	current	Former US 80
SR 81	376.30	605.60	US 70 in Safford	US 80 in Pirtleville	1927	1938	Became part of US 666, now part of US 191
SR 81	1.65	2.66	US 180 / US 191 between St. Johns and Springerville	Lyman Lake State Park	1962	2003	Access road from US 180/US 191 to Lyman Lake State Park
SR 82	65.74	105.80	I-19 BL in Nogales	SR 80 near Tombstone	1927	current	
SR 83	53.63	86.31	Parker Canyon Lake	I-10 near Tucson	1927	current	
SR 84	40.94	65.89	I-8 near Stanfield	I-10 near Picacho	1927	current	ADOT signs its eastern end at SR 287 / SR 387 in Casa Grande
SR 84A	6.08	9.78	SR 84 in Tucson	US 80 / US 89 / SR 84 in South Tucson	1951	1963	Branch of State Route 84
SR 85	117.87	189.69	Fed. 8 at Mexican border in Lukeville	I-10 in Buckeye	1936	current	
SR 86	118.12	190.10	SR 85 in Why	16th Avenue in Tucson	1930	current	
SR 87	287.28	462.33	SR 84 (unsigned) near Eloy	SR 264 near Second Mesa	1927	current	ADOT signs its southern end at I-10 near Picacho
SR 88	45.68	73.51	US 60 in Apache Junction	SR 188 near Roosevelt	1927	current	
SR 89	104.53	168.22	US 93 near Wickenburg	I-40 in Ash Fork	1992	current	
SR 89A	83.85	134.94	SR 89 in Prescott	I-40 BL in Flagstaff	1992	current	Formerly US 89A
SR 89A Spur	7.22	11.62	SR 69 near Dewey-Humboldt	SR 89A in Prescott Valley	2003	current	Unsigned
SR 89L	3.41	5.49	US Route 89 in Page	US 89 in Page	1968	2001	Loop for US 89
SR 90	46.77	75.27	SR 80 near Tombstone	I-10 in Benson	1957	current	
SR 90 Spur	0.42	0.68	Fort Huachuca eastern gate in Sierra Vista	Buffalo Soldier Trail in Sierra Vista	1974	current	Unsigned spur route of SR 90
SR 92	33.91	54.57	SR 90 near Sierra Vista	SR 80 in Bisbee	1935	current	
SR 93	247.13	397.72	Fed. 15 in Nogales	US 89 / US 93 near Wickenburg (formerly US 66 in Kingman)	1946	1991	
SR 93X	2.13	3.43	Hoover Dam Access Road in Nevada at Hoover Dam	US 93 near Hoover Dam	2010	current	Remnant of the US 93 pre-Hoover Dam Bypass alignment. Completely unrelated to former SR 93
SR 95	116.46	187.42	I-10 BL / US 95 in Quartzsite	SR 163 near Bullhead City	1936	current	
SR 95S	0.78	1.26	SR 95 near Parker	Parker Dam near Parker	1995	current	Signed as SR 95S Spur
SR 95 Truck	0.85	1.37	SR 95 in Parker	California SR 62 near Parker	1995	current	Signed as SR 95 Truck
SR 96	21.79	35.07	SR 97 near Bagdad	CR 15 (Yavapai County) in Hillside	1962	current	ADOT signs its western terminus at Old Dick Road in Bagdad
SR 97	10.91	17.56	US 93 near Congress	SR 96 near Bagdad	1962	current	
SR 98	66.89	107.65	US 89 in Page	US 160 near Tonalea	1974	current	
SR 99	44.31	71.31	Forest Service Road 34 south of Winslow	BIA Route 15 near Leupp	1970	current	
Loop 101	60.98	98.14	I-10 in Tolleson	Loop 202 in Chandler	1988	current	
SR 143	3.93	6.32	I-10 / US 60 in Phoenix	McDowell Road in Phoenix	1957	current	
SR 153	2.12	3.41	University Drive in Phoenix	Washington Street	1985	2007	
SR 160	94.21	151.62	SR 87 in Payson	US 60 / SR 77 in Show Low	1955	1969	Became part of SR 260
SR 164	50.90	81.92	US 66 / US 89 in Flagstaff	SR 64 in Valle	1960	1962	
SR 166	2.79	4.49	US 66 near Flagstaff	Walnut Canyon National Monument	1957	1970	
SR 169	15.16	24.40	SR 69 in Dewey	I-17 in Camp Verde	1971	current	
SR 170	4.01	6.45	US 70 in Peridot	San Carlos	1955	2003	Now BIA Route 170
SR 172	14.01	22.55	SR 72 in Parker	Parker Dam	1958	1962	Now SR 95S
SR 173	15.84	25.49	US 60 / SR 77 in Show Low	SR 73 in Indian Pine	1938	1972	
SR 177	31.69	51.00	SR 77 in Winkelman	US 60 in Superior	1953	current	
SR 179	14.49	23.32	I-17 near Lake Montezuma	SR 89A in Sedona	1962	current	
SR 180A	11.18	17.99	SR 61 in Concho	US 180 near Concho	1974	current	
SR 181	26.80	43.13	US 191 near Pearce	Chiricahua National Park near Willcox	1970	current	
SR 186	33.39	53.74	Virginia Avenue in Willcox	SR 181 near Willcox	1955	current	ADOT signs its western terminus at I-10 / US 191 in Willcox
SR 187	5.43	8.74	SR 387 near Casa Grande	SR 87 near Sacaton	1944	current	
SR 188	60.85	97.93	US 60 near Globe	SR 87 near Rye	1959	current	
SR 189	3.75	6.04	Fed. 15D at Mariposa Port of Entry on United States-Mexico border	SR 19 Bus. in Nogales	1956	current	
SR 195	22.08	35.53	Avenue E½ near San Luis	I-8 in Yuma	2009	current	
Loop 202	77.66	124.98	I-10 / SR 51 in Phoenix	I-10 in West Phoenix	1990	current	
SR 202 Spur	1.22	1.96	Phoenix Sky Harbor International Airport in Phoenix	Loop 202 in Phoenix	1993	current	Unsigned
SR 210	3.96	6.37	Broadway Boulevard in Tucson	Golf Links Road in Tucson	1998	current	
SR 238	20.27	32.62	Near Mobile	SR 347 in Maricopa	1986	current	
SR 260	217.78	350.48	SR 89A in Cottonwood	US 180 / US 191 in Eagar	1970	current	
SR 261	17.92	28.84	SR 273 near Crescent Lake	SR 260 in Eagar	1991	current	
SR 264	154.35	248.40	US 160 in Tuba City	NM 264 near Window Rock	1961	current	
SR 266	19.18	30.87	Fort Grant Road near Fort Grant	US 191 near Safford	1957	current	
SR 273	19.26	31.00	Three Forks Road near Big Lake	SR 260 near McNary	1957	current	
SR 277	30.66	49.34	SR 260 near Heber	SR 77 in Snowflake	1962	current	
SR 279	12.26	19.73	US 89A in Cottonwood	I-17 in Camp Verde	1955	1989	
SR 280	1.47	2.37	Interstate 8 in Yuma	I-8 BL in Yuma	1976	2007	
SR 286	45.04	72.48	United States-Mexico border in Sasabe	SR 86 in Three Points	1955	current	
SR 287	32.07	51.61	SR 84 / SR 387 in Casa Grande	SR 79 in Florence	1932	current	
SR 288	52.56	84.59	SR 188 near Theodore Roosevelt Lake	Chamberlain Trail near Young	1959	current	
SR 289	10.33	16.62	Peña Blanca Lake	I-19 near Nogales	1960	current	
Loop 303	35.25	56.73	Van Buren Street in Goodyear	I-17 near Peoria	1991	current	
SR 347	28.69	46.17	SR 84 near Stanfield	I-10 near Chandler	1997	current	
SR 360	27.17	43.73	I-10 in Tempe	US 60 / US 89 in Apache Junction	1971	1992	Now part of US 60
SR 364	5.41	8.71	SR 64 in Carrizo	New Mexico state line	1962	1964	Now part of US 160
SR 366	28.33	45.59	Near Mount Graham	US 191 at Swift Trail Junction	1960	current	
SR 373	4.46	7.18	CR 1120 in Greer	SR 260 near Eagar	1961	current	
SR 377	33.83	54.44	SR 277 near Heber	SR 77 near Holbrook	1971	current	
SR 386	11.88	19.12	Near Kitt Peak National Observatory	SR 86 near Sells	1967	current	
SR 387	15.71	25.28	SR 84 / SR 287 in Casa Grande	SR 87 near Coolidge	1967	current	
SR 389	32.60	52.46	SR-59 at the Utah state line	US 89A in Fredonia	1960	current	
Loop 404	—	—	I-11 in Buckeye	US 60 / Loop 303 in Surprise	proposed	—	Freeway currently in long-term planning
SR 410	—	—	I-19 in Sahuarita	I-10 in Tucson	proposed	—	Freeway currently in Tier II Studies
SR 464	23.19	37.32	US 160 in Kayenta	SR-47 at the Utah state line	1962	1970	Now part of US 163
SR 473	9.91	15.95	SR 260 near McNary	Near Hawley Lake	1967	current	
SR 504	4.17	6.71	US 160 in Teec Nos Pos	NM 504 at the New Mexico state line	1965	1989	Now US 64
Loop 505	55.00	88.51	US 60 in Apache Junction	I-10 in Eloy	proposed	—	Freeway currently in Tier II Studies
SR 564	9.16	14.74	US 160 near Tuba City	Near Navajo National Monument	1970	current	
SR 587	6.10	9.82	I-10 near Casa Blanca	SR 87 near Sun Lakes	1985	current	
SR 789	—	—	Fed. 15 in Nogales	US 66 / US 666 / NM 789 at the New Mexico state line	1956	1965	
SR 989	2.04	3.28	Mandarin Lane in Oro Valley	SR 77 in Oro Valley	1993	current	Unsigned
Former; Proposed and unbuilt

=== Unbuilt routes ===
Some routes listed here were eventually constructed using other route numbers.

- State Route 50
- State Route 110
- State Route 117
- State Route 176
- State Route 216
- State Route 217
- State Route 218
- State Route 220
- State Route 317
- State Route 380
- State Route 417
- State Route 487
- State Route 489
- State Route 510
- State Route 517
- State Route 589
- State Route 710
- State Route 801
- State Route 802
- State Route 810
- State Route 910
- State Route 982
- State Route 983

== Arizona parkways, historic, and scenic Roads ==
Official marker for roads under the Arizona Parkways, Historic and Scenic Roads program.

Currently, the Arizona Department of Transportation recognizes 26 state designated routes under the Parkways, Historic and Scenic Roads Program. Four are Historic Roads, 17 are Scenic Roads and five are Parkways.

=== Parkways ===
- Kaibab Plateau-North Rim Parkway – From US 89A to the Grand Canyon National Park boundary.
- Organ Pipe Cactus Parkway – From Why to Mexico.
- Sky Island Parkway – From Catalina Highway at the Coronado National Forest boundary to General Hitchcock Highway in Summerhaven
- Swift Trail Parkway – From SR 366 near US 191 to the western terminus of SR 366.

=== Historic roads ===
- Apache Trail Historic Road – From SR 88 in Goldfield to SR 188 in Roosevelt
- Historic Route 66 – From I-40 in Topock to I-40 in Holbrook (In discontinuous sections connected together by I-40)
- Historic U.S. Route 80 – From Yuma to NM 80 in New Mexico (Discontinuous sections connected together by I-8 and I-10)
- Jerome-Clarkdale-Cottonwood Historic Road (Historic US 89A) – From SR 89A in Jerome to SR 89A at the Coconino National Forest boundary.

=== Scenic roads ===
- Copper Corridor Scenic Road – SR 177 Section: From US 60 in Superior to SR 177 in Kearny. SR 77 Section: From SR 77 inside Tonto National Forest to SR 77 south of Dudleyville.
- Coronado Trail Scenic Road – From US 191 near Springerville to US 191 near Morenci.
- Desert Tall Pines Scenic Road – Entire length of SR 288.
- Diné Tah Among The People Scenic Road – From N-64 in Chinle to N-12 at I-40 near Lupton. (In two discontinuous sections, connected by N-12 through New Mexico)
- Fredonia-Vermilion Cliffs Scenic Road – From US 89A in Colorado City to US 89 in Bitter Springs.
- Gila-Pinal Scenic Road – From US 60 in Florence to US 60 at the Tonto National Forest boundary near Miami.
- Joshua Forest Scenic Road – From US 93 in Wikieup to US 93 in Wickenburg.
- Kayenta-Monument Valley Scenic Road – From US 160 in Kayenta to US 163 in Utah.
- Mingus Mountain Scenic Road – From SR 89A in Jerome to SR 89A at the Coconino National Forest boundary.
- Naat'tsis'aan Navajo Mountain Scenic Road – From SR 98 in Lechee to US 160.
- Patagonia-Sonoita Scenic Road – From SR 83 at I-10 in Vail to SR 82 near Nogales.
- Red Rock All American Road – From SR 179 in Sedona to SR 179 near I-17.
- San Francisco Peaks Scenic Road – From US 180 in Flagstaff to US 180 near Valle.
- Sedona-Oak Creek Canyon Scenic Road – From SR 89A in Sedona to SR 89A milepost 390 inside Coconino National Forest.
- Tse'nikani Flat Mesa Rock Scenic Road – From US 160 near Mexican Water to US 191 near Many Farms.
- White Mountain Scenic Road – From SR 260 in McNary to the SR 260 junction with SR 261, full length of SR 273 and Full length of SR 261.
- White River Scenic Road – From SR 260 near McNary to SR 73 in White River.
