= Arizona State Route 989 =

State highway in Arizona

State Route 989
- Tangerine Road
- SR 989 highlighted in red

Route information
- Maintained by ADOT
- Length: 2.04 mi (3.28 km)
- Existed: 1991–present

Major junctions
- West end: Mandarin Lane
- East end: SR 77 / Historic US 80 in Oro Valley

Location
- Country: United States
- State: Arizona

Highway system
- Arizona State Highway System; Interstate; US; State; Scenic Proposed; Former
← SR 789	→ I-8

State Route 989, also known as SR 989, is an unmarked state highway in Oro Valley, Arizona, that consists of a 2-mile (3 km) stretch of Tangerine Road west of State Route 77.

== Route description ==
The route was established in 1991. It is the highest numbered route in the Arizona state highway system. The number 989 was initially assigned as part of a proposed highway network for the Tucson area (in this case, the Tangerine Highway) that was never implemented.

No signage has ever existed for this highway. According to ADOT Spokesperson Donal Cassano, "SR 989 was turned back to Oro Valley (as of June 2012) and is no longer a state highway." Nonetheless, the Arizona Department of Transportation (ADOT) continues to log the highway in its official state highway system.

== History ==
The route was originally conceived in 1988, to connect SR 77 (then-signed as US 89) in Oro Valley to SR 86 west of Tucson. It was proposed as an urban freeway to serve Tucson. The road was established as a state highway on its current routing through Oro Valley in 1991. Following its establishment, the road was not otherwise adjusted and remains today with its original routing. As of January 2016, there are no plans to widen Tangerine Rd. or expand it to expressway or freeway standards.

== Major intersections ==
The highway from milepost 0.00-33.96 was proposed but never implemented as part of the route. The entire route is in Oro Valley, Pima County.

mi	km	Destinations	Notes
33.96	54.65	Mandarin Lane	Western terminus; road continues as Tangerine Road
36.00	57.94	SR 77 / Historic US 80 (Oracle Road) – Oracle, Tucson	Eastern terminus
1.000 mi = 1.609 km; 1.000 km = 0.621 mi
