= Maricopa Association of Governments =

Council of governments for greater Phoenix, United States

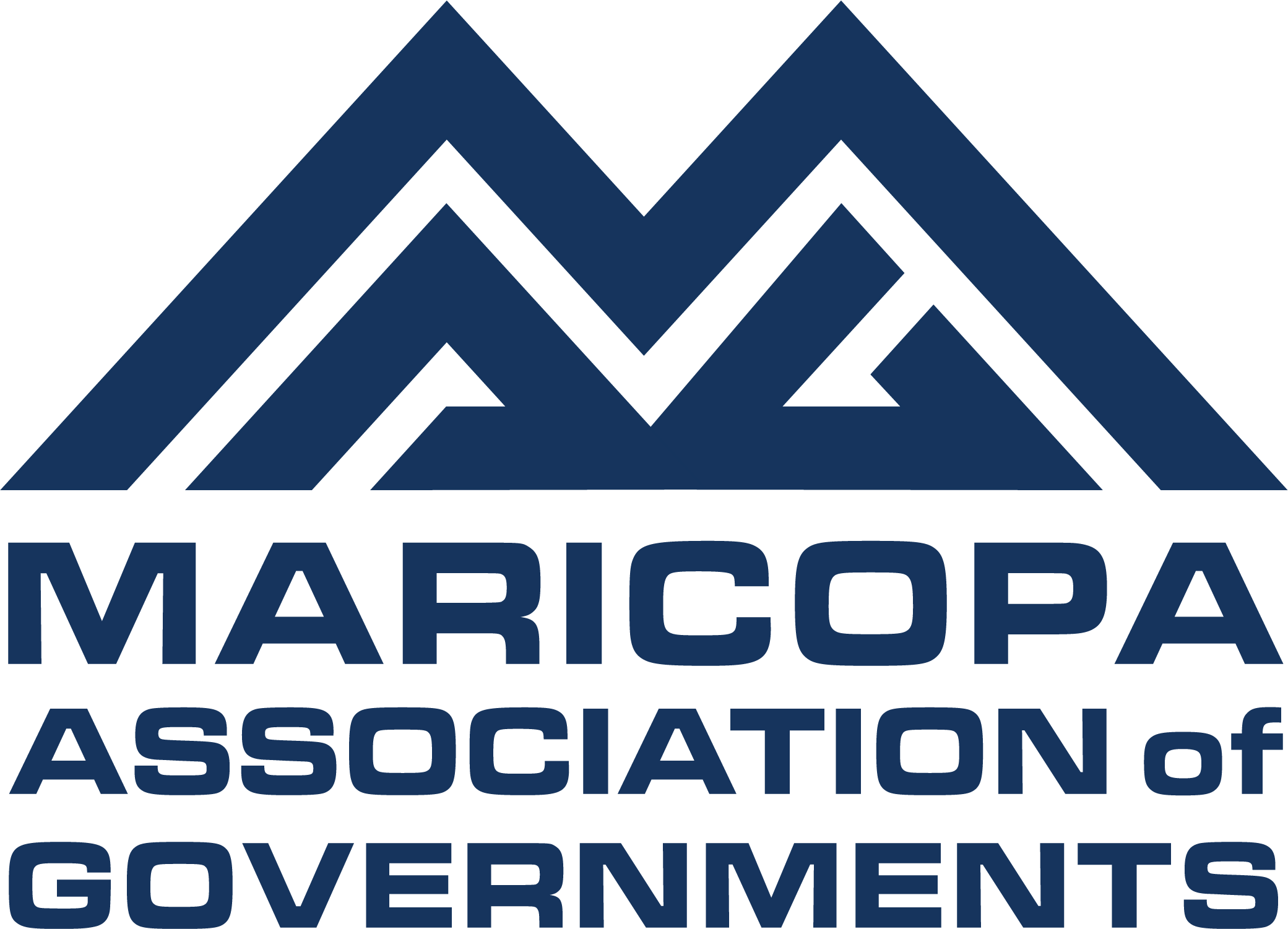
MAG Logo

Maricopa Association of Governments (MAG) is a Council of Governments (COG) that serves as the regional agency for the greater Maricopa region in Arizona, United States. This includes the Phoenix area and the neighboring urbanized area in Pinal County, containing the Town of Florence and City of Maricopa. When MAG was formed in 1967, the elected officials recognized the need for long-range planning and policy development on a regional scale. They realized that many issues such as transportation, air quality and human services affected residents beyond the borders of their individual jurisdictions.

MAG is the designated Metropolitan planning organization (MPO) for transportation planning in the Maricopa County region. Additionally, beginning in 1973, MAG was also designated by the Governor of the State of Arizona to serve as the principal planning agency for the region in a number of other areas, including air quality, water quality and solid waste management. In addition, through an Executive Order from the Governor, MAG develops population estimates and projections for the region.

== Purpose ==
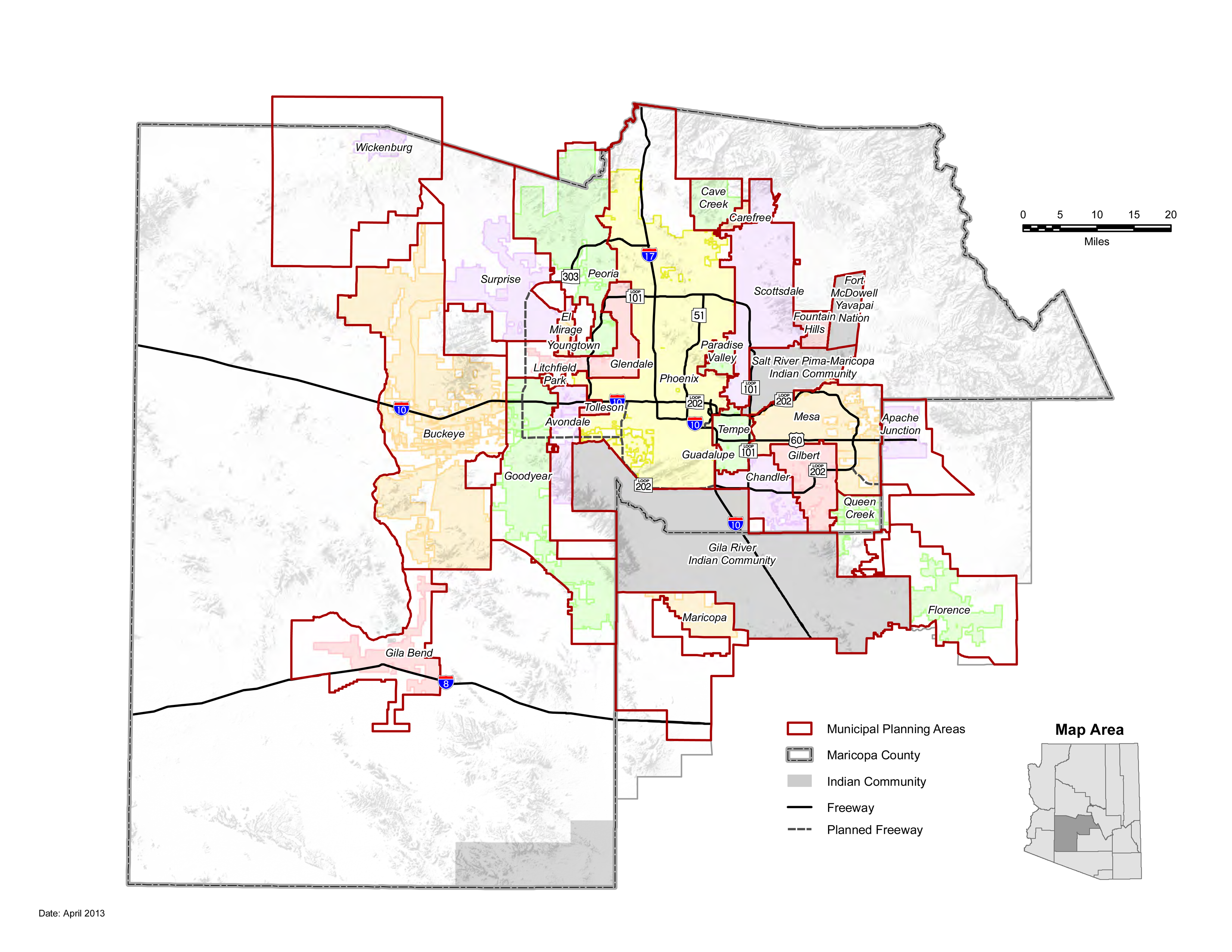
MAG consists of all of Maricopa County and the cities, towns, and Indian reservations in the county. Apache Junction, while being located mostly in Pinal County is represented in MAG, as well as other cities that extend into neighboring counties.

MAG is based on the principle that cities, towns, counties, and Native American Communities should exercise the basic initiative and leadership and should have the primary responsibility for addressing those local problems and needs which require action on an area-wide or regional basis.

The Articles of Incorporation for MAG state that the association was formed to do the following:

- Provide a forum for discussion and study of regional problems of mutual interest to the governments in the region.
- Ensure, through cooperation and the pooling of common resources, maximum efficiency and economy in governmental operations, which will provide every citizen with the utmost value for every dollar.
- Identify and comprehensively plan for the solution of regional problems requiring multicity, town and county cooperation.
- Facilitate agreements among the governmental units for specific projects or other interrelated developmental actions or for the adoption of common policies with respect to problems that are common to its members.
- Attain the greatest degree of intergovernmental cooperation possible in order to prepare for future growth and development of the region.

== Regional Council ==
The Regional Council is the governing and policy-making body for the organization and is composed of elected officials appointed by each MAG member agency. For most members, the city or town mayor serves as the Regional Council representative. The chairs of the Boards of Supervisors represent Maricopa and Pinal Counties on the Regional Council. The State Transportation Board members for Maricopa County represent the Arizona Department of Transportation (ADOT). The three Native American Communities are represented by their governor or president.

== Member Agencies ==
MAG is a Council of Governments that represents 27 cities and towns, three Native American Indian Communities, Maricopa County, and portions of Pinal County. Members include representatives from the incorporated cities and towns in Maricopa County as well as the City of Maricopa, Town of Florence, Maricopa County, Pinal County, Gila River Indian Community, Salt River Pima–Maricopa Indian Community, Fort McDowell Yavapai Nation, and the Arizona Department of Transportation..

List of Member Agencies:

- City of Apache Junction
- City of Avondale
- City of Buckeye
- Town of Carefree
- Town of Cave Creek
- City of Chandler
- City of El Mirage
- Town of Florence
- Fort McDowell Yavapai Nation
- Town of Fountain Hills
- Town of Gila Bend
- Gila River Indian Community
- Town of Gilbert
- City of Glendale
- City of Goodyear
- Town of Guadalupe
- City of Litchfield Park
- City of Maricopa
- Maricopa County
- City of Mesa
- City of Peoria
- City of Phoenix
- Pinal County
- Town of Queen Creek
- Salt River Pima-Maricopa Indian Community
- City of Scottsdale
- City of Surprise
- City of Tempe
- City of Tolleson
- Town of Wickenburg
- Town of Youngtown

Arizona Department of Transportation:

- State Transportation Board (2 members)
