= Arizona Department of Transportation =

State government agency

Agency overview
- Formed: July 1, 1974; 52 years ago
- Preceding agencies: Arizona Highway Department; Arizona Department of Aeronautics
- Jurisdiction: State of Arizona
- Headquarters: 1801 West Jefferson Street Phoenix, Arizona
- Agency executive: Jennifer Toth, Director
- Parent agency: State of Arizona
- Website: azdot.gov

The Arizona Department of Transportation (ADOT, /ˈeɪdɒt/) is an Arizona state government agency charged with facilitating mobility within the state. In addition to managing the state's highway system, the agency is also involved with public transportation and municipal airports. The department was created in 1974 when the state merged the Arizona Highway Department with the Arizona Department of Aeronautics.

Jennifer Toth was appointed by Governor Katie Hobbs as the ADOT Director in January 2023. Former U.S. secretary of transportation Mary Peters had previously been a Director of ADOT. The past Federal Highway Administrator, Victor Mendez, was also previously a Director of ADOT.

ADOT's publications division publishes Arizona Highways magazine.

== Vehicle Registration Divisions ==
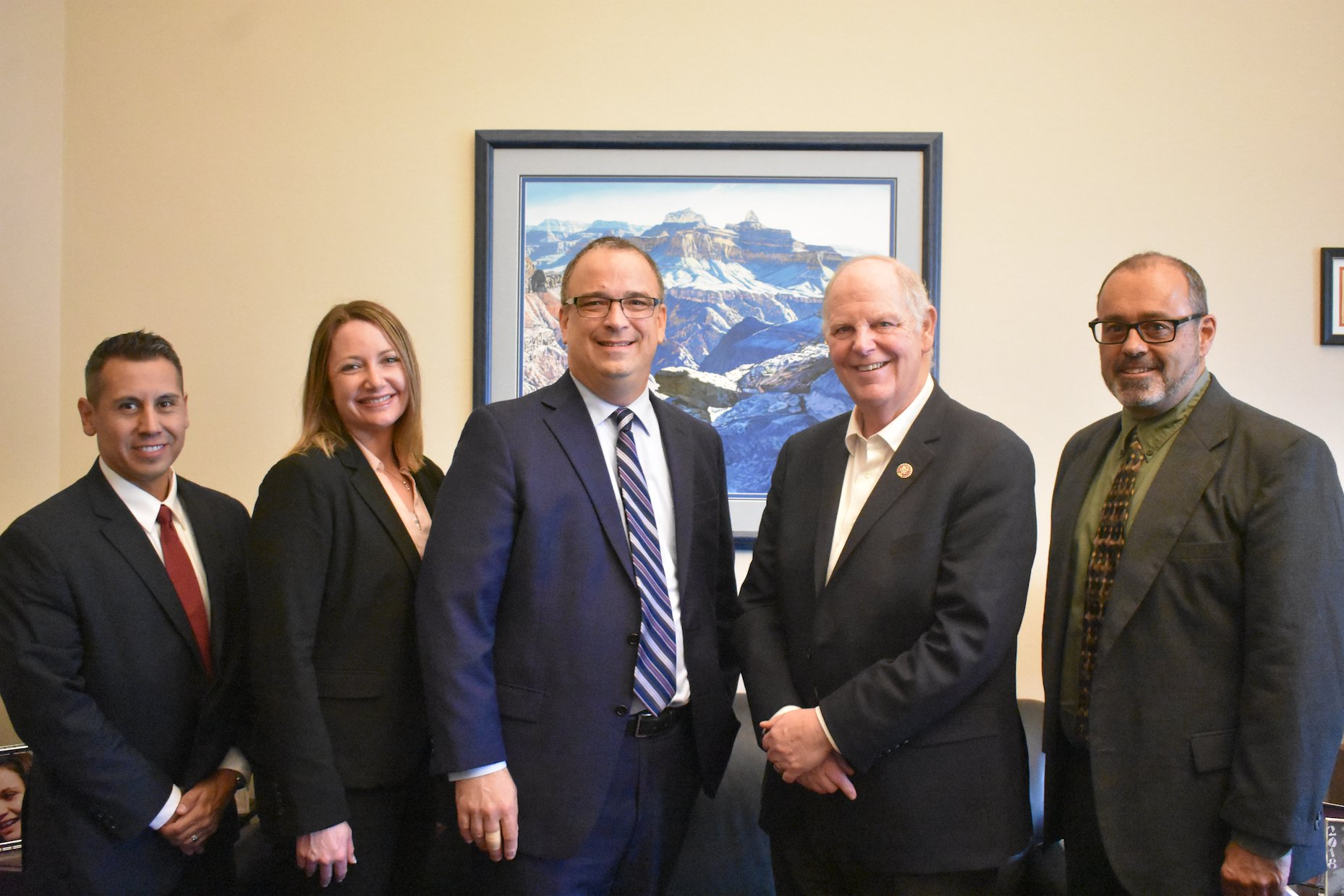
Staff members at the Arizona DOT meeting with Congressmember Tom O'Halleran in 2020.

=== Aeronautics Division ===
The Aeronautics Division, now a part of the Multimodal Planning Division, promotes aviation in the state, license aircraft dealers, assists in the development of public airport projects and manages Grand Canyon National Park Airport.

=== Motor Vehicle Division ===
The Motor Vehicle Division (MVD) is responsible for driver licensing and vehicle registration. It has 1600 employees and an annual operating budget of $72 million. Currently it is headed by ADOT Assistant Director Eric Jorgensen.

As of FY 2023, the MVD has 7,969,576 license plates registered with the department.

There are also third party providers that provide limited services.

=== Enforcement and Compliance Division ===
The Enforcement and Compliance Division utilizes certified peace officers to enforce transportation related laws and regulations.

The Enforcement and Compliance Division was originally the enforcement component of the Motor Vehicle Division. Created in 2010 by former division Director, Terry Connor (retired Arizona DPS Commander), the Division separated from the Motor Vehicle Division to improve the enforcement capabilities of the department. Under current Division Director Tim Lane, the division continues to provide the state of Arizona a highly trained agency to protect Arizona's infrastructure. The Enforcement and Compliance Division has 3 separate units: the Enforcement Services Bureau, Office of Inspector General and the Executive Hearing Office.

The Enforcement Services Bureau (ESB) utilizes certified police officers to enforce state and federal commercial vehicle regulations. Stationed at Port of Entry stations, mobile scale teams and MVD offices, these officers are trained to perform a variety of duties and also enforce fuel tax laws. The Bureau also assists other state, local and federal agencies when needed.

The Office of Inspector General (OIG) utilizes detectives to deter theft, fraud and other crimes as well as assisting other state, local and federal agencies.

The Executive Hearing Office (EHO) employs an Administrative Law Judge and staff on driver license hearings and other administrative cases.

=== Multimodal Planning Division ===
The Multimodal Planning Division (MPD) is the arm of ADOT involved in transportation planning. As its name suggests, the mandate for the MPD deals with creating plans for various modes of transport, including highways and public transit at both a regional and statewide level.

== Freeway signs ==
ADOT is noted for using pop-culture references to catch commuters eyes and deliver important safety tips on the electronic overhead signs. References have included Star Wars, Star Trek, and Pokémon Go. Signs have included:

- "Drinking & Driving go together like Peas and Guac"
- "Awaken your inner force. Focus on the road."
- "Texting and driving leads to the dark side."
- "The force is strong with you. Put down the phone."
- "Be a rebel, not a clone. Put down the phone."
- "Road rage? Let the Wookiee win."
- "Drive Sober Live Long and Prosper"

== See also ==
- List of state routes in Arizona
- Outline of Arizona
- U.S. Department of Transportation
- Vehicle registration plates of Arizona
