= Arterial roads in metropolitan Phoenix =

System of roads in the Phoenix, Arizona metropolitan area

This list of arterial roads is incomplete; you can help by expanding it.

Many arterial roads in the Phoenix metropolitan area have the same name in multiple cities or towns. Some roads change names or route numbers across town borders, resulting in occasional confusion. For example, the road known as Apache Boulevard in Tempe continues east as Main Street in neighboring Mesa and then as Apache Trail in Apache Junction. Although Broadway Road maintains the same name through Goodyear, Avondale, Phoenix, Tempe, Mesa, and Apache Junction, each town uses a different reference point for address numbers.

Three arterial roads run continuously for over 40 miles (Baseline Road, Southern Avenue, and Indian School Road). Five other arterial roads run continuously for over 30 miles (Broadway Road, Camelback Road, McDowell Road, Bell Road, and Van Buren Street).

== A ==
=== Alma School Road ===
Alma School Road
- Location: Goodyear Village; Sun Lakes; Chandler; Mesa; Salt River Pima–Maricopa Indian Community; Scottsdale

Alma School Road is a north–south arterial road in the southeastern part of the Phoenix metropolitan area. It begins in Goodyear Village for a mile before transitioning into Sun Lakes at Hunt Highway. It stays in Sun Lakes for two miles until reaching Chandler Heights Road, where it transitions into Chandler, where it stays for the next nine miles. The highway crosses the Loop 202, and eventually upon reaching the Western Canal, transitions into Mesa, where it stays for the next six miles, including crossing the U.S. Route 60, At the north Loop 202, the highway transitions from Mesa to the Salt River Pima–Maricopa Indian Community, where it stays for the next five and a half miles.

In Scottsdale, Alma School Road resumes, running from Happy Valley Road to Jomex Road, then as Alma School Parkway from Jomex Road to the McDowell Sonoran Preserve.

==== Landmarks ====
- Banner Ocotillo Medical Center
- NXP Semiconductors
- Fiesta Mall
- Alma School/Main Street station
- McDowell Sonoran Preserve

=== Anthem Way ===
Anthem Way
- Location: Anthem

Anthem Way is an east–west arterial road in the northern part of the Phoenix metropolitan area in Anthem. It extends slightly west of 46th Drive, continues east, passing the Interstate 17, Anthem Outlet Mall (the site of the Anthem Christmas tree), and Anthem Community Park. The road continues southeast until ending at Liberty Bell Way.

=== Apache Boulevard ===
Apache Boulevard
- Location: Tempe

Apache Boulevard is an east–west arterial road in the southeastern part of the Phoenix metropolitan area. The highway extends from Mill Avenue in Tempe, passing through Arizona State University. After passing Terrace Road, the median is taken over by the Valley Metro Rail. Apache Boulevard continues east as it passes through the Loop 101, and after passing the Tempe Canal, the highway continues as Main Street. Historic U.S. Route 80 runs along Apache Boulevard.

=== Apache Trail ===
Apache Trail
- Location: Mesa; Apache Junction; Youngberg; Tortilla Flat

Apache Trail is an east–west arterial road in the southeastern part of the Phoenix metropolitan area. Its western terminus begins as Main Street ends after its intersection with Sossaman Road. Apache Trail continues eastward through the city of Mesa and crosses through Loop 202. At Meridian Road, the highway transitions out of Mesa and Maricopa County into Apache Junction and Pinal County. The highway continues for two miles eastward until it transitions into Old West Highway, turning diagonally southeast. Historic U.S. Route 80 runs this portion of Apache Trail.

Apache Trail continues diagonally northeastern through Apache Junction and later as a trail passing through many landmarks including Goldfield Ghost Town and Mine Tours, Lost Dutchman State Park and eventually Canyon Lake and Theodore Roosevelt Lake. Arizona State Route 88 runs this portion of Apache Trail from Idaho Road east.

=== Arizona Avenue ===
Arizona Avenue
- Location: Chandler
- Length: 10.6 mi (17.1 km)

Arizona Avenue is a north–south arterial road in the southeastern part of the Phoenix metropolitan area. The highway comprises the portion of Arizona State Route 87 (SR 87) within the city of Chandler. The entire length of Arizona Avenue is part of the National Highway System as a principal arterial.

Arizona Avenue begins at Hunt Highway, which forms the south city limit of Chandler and also the Maricopa–Pinal county line. This intersection also forms the northern terminus of SR 587; SR 87 briefly heads east on Hunt Highway before turning southeast fully into Pinal County. Arizona Avenue heads north as a four-lane divided highway, passing Hamilton High School. Between Riggs Road and Chandler Heights Road, the road expands to six lanes. North of its diamond interchange with SR 202 (Santan Freeway), the highway reduces to four lanes and passes through downtown Chandler. At the north end of downtown, Arizona Avenue passes the Chandler Center for the Arts and Chandler High School and becomes a six-lane road with center turn lane. The highway continues through an intersection with Elliot Road to the Western Canal, where SR 87 continues north into the city of Mesa as Country Club Drive.

=== Avondale Boulevard ===
Avondale Boulevard
- Location: Avondale

Avondale Boulevard is a north–south arterial road in the midwestern part of the Phoenix metropolitan area. It begins at the eastern terminus of Jimmie Johnson Drive nearby the Phoenix Raceway in Avondale. It continues north through Avondale, and eventually passes the Interstate 10, and later West Point High School. It ends at Thomas Road, where it transitions into Garden Lakes Parkway.

== B ==
=== Baseline Road ===
Baseline Road
- Location: Buckeye; Phoenix; Tempe; Mesa; Gilbert; Apache Junction

Baseline Road is a significant east–west arterial road. This road is so named because it runs along the length of the primary baseline for Arizona as given under the Public Land Survey System.

This line runs east–west from the "zero point" atop a hill near the confluence of the Gila and Salt rivers, on Avondale Boulevard (115th Avenue) at Baseline Road. This site is next to Phoenix Raceway. Avondale Boulevard is laid out atop the north–south base meridian, called the Gila and Salt River meridian.

Due to natural obstructions, Baseline is not continuous. The longest continuous stretch of Baseline Road is approximately 43 miles (69 km). The road is located in Maricopa County and Pinal County. There is also a rural road named Baseline Road in southern La Paz County close to the Colorado River which is located near Arizona's baseline.

Because of the grid plan used by cities in Arizona, the name for the road is applied for non-contiguous sections and is theoretically reserved for future east–west roads built at the same latitude.

==== Route description ====
Starting from east, the road begins in Apache Junction in Pinal County, named Baseline Avenue and is a small segment of thoroughfare in a residential neighborhood at the foothills of the Superstition Mountains. The route picks up again and runs due westward, running parallel to US 60. At the Maricopa County border, the road enters Mesa and is named Baseline Road. It becomes a major arterial road as it passes through Gilbert and Tempe. In Tempe, it intersects Loop 101 and then Interstate 10. Continuing, the road runs through south Phoenix and the major arterial segment of the road terminates in the Gila River Indian Community, approximately where the Salt River joins the Gila River.

The road reappears on the other side of the Gila River at an orthogonal junction with Perryville Rd. as CR-85 and continues westward through central Buckeye. From there, it continues through farmland in western Maricopa county in various non-continuous segments. The segment of Baseline Road farthest west in Maricopa County is just past 547th Avenue.

==== Landmarks ====
Notable locations along or near Baseline Road include Arizona Mills and Phoenix International Raceway. Baseline Road runs through the historical farming community of Laveen.

=== Beardsley Road ===
Beardsley Road
- Location: Peoria; Sun City; Glendale; Phoenix

Beardsley Road is an east–west arterial road in the northern part of the Phoenix metropolitan area. It begins at 112th Avenue in Peoria, Arizona, and at 107th Avenue, continues on the Peoria-Sun City borderline for a mile, before going solely back into Peoria. Upon reaching the Loop 101, the highway reaches Glendale and breaks into and eastbound and westbound path. It continues in Glendale for three and a half miles. At 51st Avenue, the highway goes into the Phoenix urban village of Deer Valley for seven miles. At 16th Street, the highway continues in the Paradise Valley urban village and ends its run against the 101 at Cave Creek Road, where it continues again as an arterial road until 34th Street.

=== Bell Road ===
Bell Road
- Location: Surprise; Peoria; Glendale; Phoenix; Scottsdale

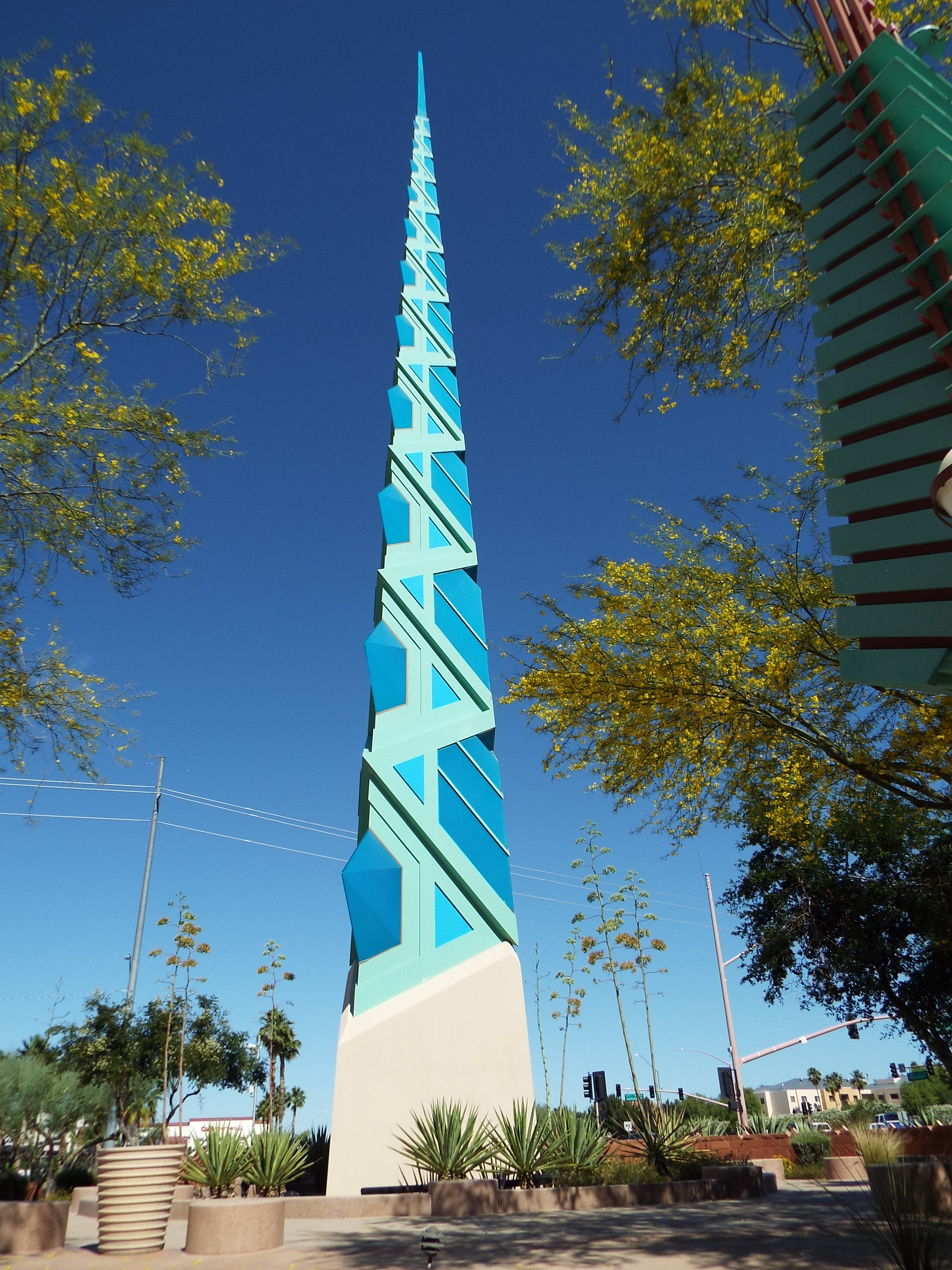
The Scottsdale Spire, located at the southeast corner of Bell and Scottsdale Roads

Bell Road is a major east–west arterial road in northern metropolitan Phoenix. Bell Road is one of the few roadways to cross the Agua Fria River in the northern part of the metro area, providing a link between the growing suburb of Surprise with Phoenix. As a result, the portion of Bell Road passing through Surprise and Sun City is the busiest arterial road in the state of Arizona.

==== Route description ====
The main segment of Bell Road, approximately 31 miles (50 km) in length, begins at the corporate boundaries of Phoenix and Scottsdale at its intersection with Scottsdale Road; east of Scottsdale Road, the roadway curves to the southeast and becomes Frank Lloyd Wright Boulevard. Traveling west, the road intersects with State Route 51 and Interstate 17 in Phoenix, the western leg of State Route 101 in Peoria, and U.S. Route 60 and State Route 303 in Surprise. West of the Beardsley Canal, the roadway curves around the White Tank Mountain Regional Park, becoming the Sun Valley Parkway through northern Buckeye.

East of 66th Street, Bell Road takes a south-easterly bend and, at its intersection with Scottsdale Road, becomes Frank Lloyd Wright Boulevard, named in recognition of architect and designer Frank Lloyd Wright. This alignment was built in the mid-1970s during the construction of the CAP canal. In this area of Scottsdale, a non-contiguous segment of Bell Road approximately 3 miles (4.8 km) long exists north of Frank Lloyd Wright Boulevard, which includes an intersection with the eastern leg of State Route 101.

==== Landmarks ====
Prominent locations on or near Bell Road include the Scottsdale Municipal Airport, Turf Paradise, The Villas on Bell, Arrowhead Towne Center and the Peoria Sports Complex. Bell Road also forms the boundary of the original town site of Surprise.

=== Bella Vista Road ===
Bella Vista Road
- Location: San Tan Valley

Bella Vista Road is an east–west arterial road in the southeastern part of the Phoenix metropolitan area in San Tan Valley. It begins at Hunt Highway at the eastern terminus of Golf Club Drive. The highway continues east, passing the Central Arizona College - San Tan Campus. The road continues for five miles until reaching Attaway Road.

=== Bethany Home Road ===
Bethany Home Road
- Location: Buckeye; Citrus Park; Glendale; Phoenix

Bethany Home Road is an east–west arterial road in the midcentral part of the Phoenix metropolitan area. It begins at Jackrabbit Trail in Buckeye where it continues east before ending at a dead end. At Canyon View High School, the highway continues before transitioning into Citrus Park at Perryville Road. The highway continues in Citrus Park for two miles, before exiting the town at Cotton Lane. It crosses the Loop 303. It ends a stretch slightly east of Sarival Avenue due to restraints of the Luke Air Force Base.

Another stretch continues at Litchfield Road in Glendale, continuing for two miles until El Mirage Road. Another stretch continues at 83rd Avenue, passing Glendale Heroes Regional Park, continuing in Glendale for five for miles. At 43rd Avenue, the highway transitions into the Alhambra urban village of Phoenix for five miles, and crossing the Interstate 17. The highway continues for over a mile in the Camelback East village before ending at the Arizona State Route 51.

=== Broadway Road ===
Broadway Road
- Location: Buckeye; Goodyear; Avondale; Phoenix; Tempe; Mesa; Apache Junction

Broadway Road is an east–west arterial road in the Phoenix metropolitan area. The highway extends from the Arizona State Route 85 in Buckeye, the highway continues in Buckeye for ten miles until it intersects 187th Avenue, where it transitions into Goodyear for another mile and a half, before ending at a dead end.

The highway continues another stretch at Bullard Avenue for another mile, ending at Litchfield Road.

The highway continues another stretch at El Mirage Road in Avondale, staying in Avondale for another two miles until 107th Avenue, where it leaves Avondale and moves into Phoenix in the Estrella village for seven miles, eventually crossing the Arizona State Route 202 and ends a westbound stretch at 51st Avenue. Another eastbound stretch continues a half mile south in the Laveen urban village. The highway stays in Laveen for three miles. At 27th Avenue, the highway leaves the Laveen village before entering the South Mountain urban village for another eight miles.

At 48th Street, the highway fully leaves both the South Mountain urban village and the city of Phoenix and enters the city of Tempe, where it crosses the Interstate 10, and continues in Tempe for five miles. After crossing both the Arizona State Route 101, and the Tempe Canal, the highway fully crosses into Mesa. The highway continues in Mesa for eighteen miles, including crossing the Arizona State Route 202. At Meridian Road, the highway leaves both Mesa and Maricopa County, and crossing into both Apache Junction and Pinal County, where the highway continues as Broadway Avenue.

The highway continues for two miles before ending a brief stretch at Idaho Road. Another stretch continues a half mile east at Royal Palm Road, where it continues for three and a half miles before ending in a neighborhood.

=== Brown Road ===
Brown Road
- Location: Mesa

Brown Road is an east–west arterial road in the Phoenix metropolitan area. The highway extends slightly west of Country Club Drive (Arizona State Route 87), and passing by different landmarks including Mountain View High School, Red Mountain Baseball Complex, and crosses the Loop 202 in its fifteen-mile run. It reaches its eastern terminus at Meridian Road, where the highway transitions to Lost Dutchman Boulevard as it enters Pinal County and Apache Junction.

=== Buckeye Road ===
Buckeye Road
- Location: Avondale; Tolleson; Phoenix

Buckeye Road is an east–west arterial road in the central part of the Phoenix metropolitan area. It begins in the outskirts of town at Wintersburg Road for over five miles before ending a stretch slightly east of Hassayampa Road.

The next stretch continues from MC 85 at Dysart Road in Avondale, and continues in Avondale for three miles. At 107th Avenue, the highway continues on the Tolleson-Phoenix borderline for four miles. At 75th Avenue, the highway continues fully into Phoenix for the remainder of its run. In the urban village, Estrella Village, Buckeye Road continues east passing by the Loop 202 for six and a half miles. After passing the Interstate 17, the highway continues into the Central City urban village for five miles, ending at the Phoenix Sky Harbor International Airport.

=== Bullard Avenue ===
Bullard Avenue
- Location: Goodyear; Surprise

Bullard Avenue is a north–south arterial road in the western part of the Phoenix metropolitan area. The highway begins at Vineyard Avenue in Goodyear, continuing north for two miles before ending a stretch at MC 85. Another stretch continues at Estrella Parkway, going northeast, before fully going north for five and a half miles and passes the Interstate 10, it ends a stretch at Indian School Road.

Another stretch continues in Surprise at Peoria Avenue, continuing north for four miles, passing Surprise Stadium, Surprise Community Park and Surprise City Hall, before ending at Bell Road.

== C ==
=== Cactus Road ===
Cactus Road
- Location: Surprise; El Mirage; Peoria; Glendale; Phoenix; Scottsdale

Cactus Road is a major east–west arterial route, serving Northern Phoenix and its suburbs. The road consists of three dis-connected segments, all sharing the name of Cactus Road, and being on the same latitude line. Starting at its eastern terminus at an intersection with Frank Lloyd Wright Boulevard at the site of Taliesin West, the route travels as a two-lane residential road through the Cactus Corridor community. West of an intersection with 94th Street, the road becomes a true arterial, increasing to four to five lanes, which it is throughout much of its length. Shortly after, the road encounters the Loop 101 at a diamond interchange. The route continues as an arterial through Scottsdale, encountering Hayden Road. At Scottsdale Road, the route enters Phoenix for the first time. Through Phoenix, the road continues serving the many residential neighborhoods, businesses, and golf courses along its path. Eventually, the road makes its way to Paradise Valley, where at intersections with Paradise Village Parkway and Tatum Boulevard, it serves to provide access to a massive commercial area, formerly the home of Paradise Valley Mall and the future home of the "PV" outdoor retail and lifestyle district, similar to Desert Ridge Marketplace. Continuing west, the road intersects the SR-51 freeway at a SPUI design. Continuing west, through the Shadow Mountain community, the road serves a large number of schools, through the suburban sprawl of Phoenix. At an intersection with Cave Creek Road, the segment meets its end, as the road continues west as Thunderbird Road, curving through the Shaw Butte Mountains. West of the mountains, at 19th Avenue, a new segment begins, continuing as an arterial. An intersection with the Interstate 17 freeway provides access to Phoenix's most critical freeway corridor from Cactus. Continuing west through Phoenix's western suburbs, the road continues serving neighborhoods, schools, and now parks. At 75th Avenue, it provides access to Central Peoria, the main business heart of Peoria. At a complex multi-legged intersection with 91st Avenue, Loop 101, and Grand Avenue/US-60, the segment meets its western end. West of the Agua Fria River Cactus re-spawns for the third and final time. This time as a much more residential road, serving various golf course communities through the city of Surprise, and meeting fellow arterials El Mirage, Dysart, Litchfield, Bullard, and Reems. A SPUI interchange provides access to the Loop 303. On its last legs, the road travels through its final golf courses and neighborhoods, finally ending at the Beardsley Canal Wash. Future developments in a rapidly growing west valley could see Cactus be further extended west, but the cost of a bridge over the wash, as well as the nearby White Tank Mountains propose challenges.

=== Camelback Road ===
Camelback Road
- Location: Goodyear; Litchfield Park; Phoenix; Glendale; Scottsdale

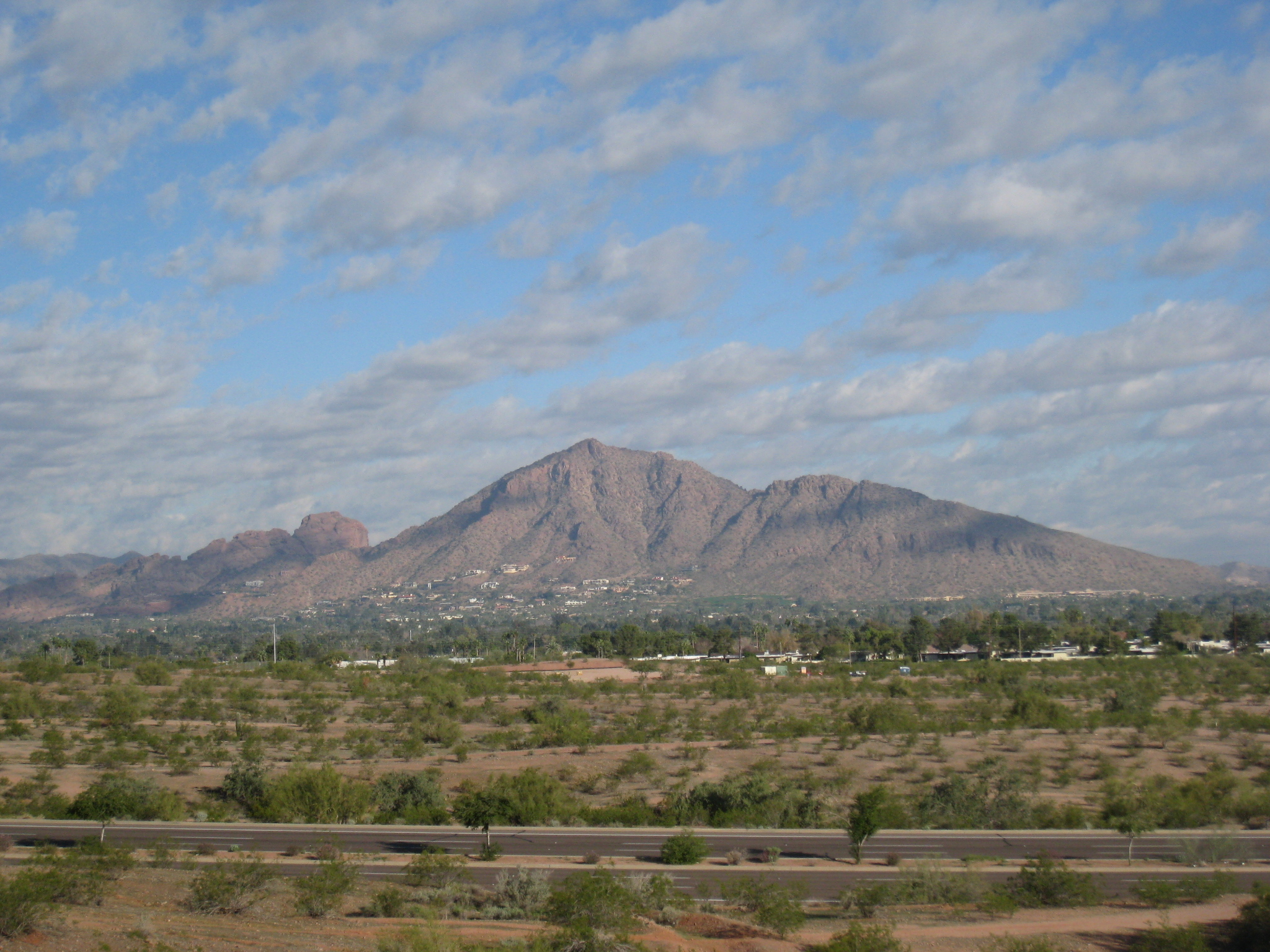
Camelback Mountain

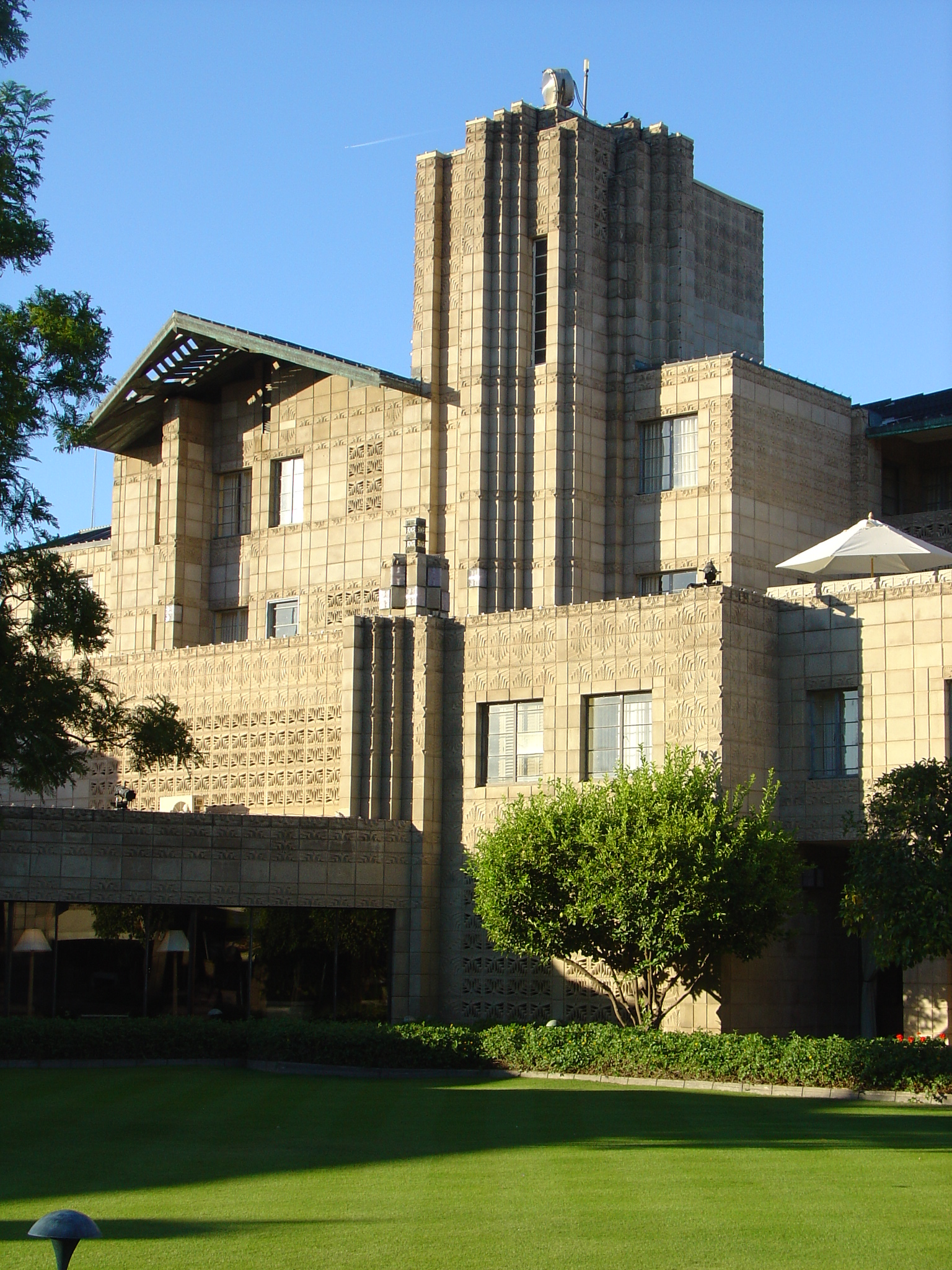
The Arizona Biltmore Hotel

Camelback Road is a prominent street in the Phoenix metropolitan area.

The street stretches continuously for approximately 33 miles from Scottsdale in the east to Litchfield Park in the west, and runs through the city of Phoenix. Scottsdale Fashion Square is located at the corner of Camelback and Scottsdale Roads.

Camelback Road passes Grand Canyon University just west of the Interstate 17.

Camelback Road runs directly south of Phoenix's famous Camelback Mountain, the Phoenician Resort, the Royal Palms Resort and Spa, and the Hermosa Inn (to the north). Further west, the upscale Biltmore district of Phoenix is located along Camelback Road, including the Arizona Biltmore Hotel (to the north), Biltmore Fashion Park, as well as one of Phoenix's primary business districts (sometimes called the Camelback Corridor). At the west end of Phoenix, Camelback Road passes Camelback Ranch.

In Litchfield Park, Camelback Road passes Goodyear's historic Organization House, opened 1918, and The Wigwam, opened 1929.

West of Litchfield Park, Camelback Road skirts the southern boundary of Luke Air Force Base. It ends at Jackrabbit Trail between Goodyear and Buckeye.

=== Cardinals Way ===
Cardinals Way
- Location: Glendale

Cardinals Way is an east–west arterial road in Glendale. The highway begins at 99th Avenue, and passes the Loop 101, passing the State Farm Stadium, home of the Arizona Cardinals. The highway continues for two miles until 83rd Avenue, where it transitions into Bethany Home Road.

=== Carefree Highway ===
Carefree Highway
- Location: Peoria; Phoenix; Cave Creek; Scottsdale
- Length: 42.2 mi (67.9 km)

Carefree Highway is an east–west arterial road in the northern part of the Phoenix metropolitan area. The highway begins where Arizona State Route 74 (SR 74) meets the north end of Lake Pleasant Parkway in northern Peoria; SR 74 continues west along Lake Pleasant Road. Carefree Highway extends east through Interstate 17 (I-17), which is the eastern terminus of SR 74, to Scottsdale Road on the border of Scottsdale and Carefree. The entire length of Carefree Highway is part of the National Highway System as a principal arterial. Carefree Highway is the inspiration for Gordon Lightfoot's eponymous song.

Carefree Highway begins at Lake Pleasant Parkway in a rural part of the city of Peoria; SR 74 continues west as Lake Pleasant Road toward its western terminus at U.S. Route 60 near Morristown. Carefree Highway heads east as a two-lane road through open desert in the northern parts of Peoria and then the North Gateway urban village of the city of Phoenix. Shortly before reaching I-17 (Arizona Veterans Highway), the highway passes the Ben Avery Shooting Facility. SR 74 reaches its eastern terminus at the partial cloverleaf interchange with I-17; Carefree Road continues east as a four-lane divided municipal highway. The highway curves through a mountain range before returning to its longitudinal course, along which it leaves the city of Phoenix and then follows the northern city limit along the Desert View urban village. Carefree Highway then follows the south town limit of Cave Creek and briefly enters that town around its intersection with Cave Creek Road. The highway drops to two lanes and follows the border between Scottsdale to the south and Carefree to the north before reaching its eastern terminus at a three-legged intersection with Scottsdale Road, which heads south into Scottsdale, and Tom Darlington Drive, which heads north into Carefree.

=== Cave Creek Road ===
Cave Creek Road
- Location: Phoenix; Cave Creek
- Length: 31.1 mi (50.1 km)

Cave Creek Road is an arterial road in the north central part of the Phoenix metropolitan area. The highway is part of the National Highway System as a principal arterial from its southern terminus at Seventh Street in Phoenix north to Carefree Highway on the border of Cave Creek and Carefree.

Cave Creek Road begins at a five-way intersection with north–south Seventh Street and east–west Dunlap Road in the North Mountain urban village of the city of Phoenix. The highway heads northeast as a four-lane road with center turn lane between North Mountain to the west and Stoney Mountain to the east. Cave Creek Road curves north as it enters the urban village of Paradise Valley and intersects another principal arterial, which heads northwest as Thunderbird Road and east as Cactus Road. The highway expands to six lanes and heads northeast along the west flank of Shadow Mountain before heading straight north through an intersection with Bell Road and becoming a six-lane divided highway at its a single-point urban interchange with Arizona State Route 101 (Pima Freeway). Cave Creek Road enters the Desert View urban village as it crosses over the Central Arizona Project aqueduct. The highway curves north-north-east toward Cave Creek, drops to four lanes, and passes through several miles of open desert between lobes of suburban sprawl. Cave Creek Road returns to the suburban sprawl of Desert View before the principal arterial portion of the highway ends at Carefree Highway.

Cave Creek Road continues as a collector road north and east through Cave Creek, Carefree (near the Desert Forest Golf Club), and the far northern part of Scottsdale to the Tonto National Forest, where it continues on as Seven Springs Road to Camp Creek.

=== Central Avenue ===
Central Avenue
- Location: Phoenix

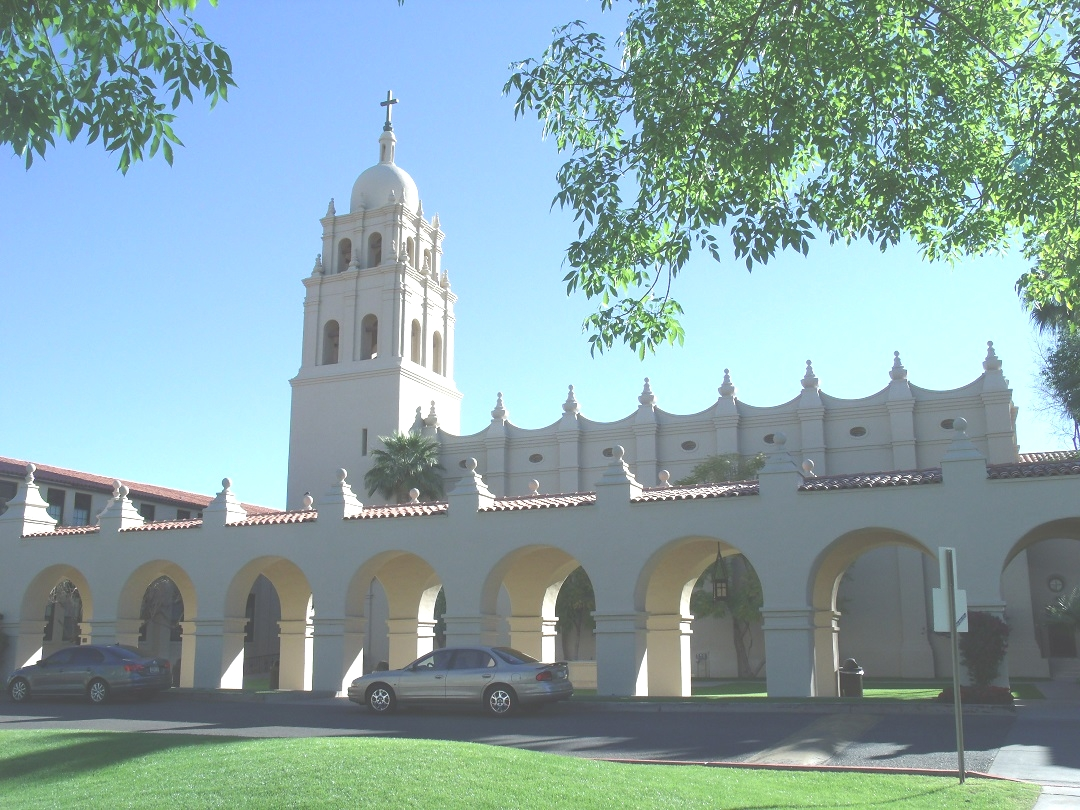
The Brophy College Chapel

The arterial section of Central Avenue is from South Mountain Park to North Mountain in Phoenix. North of North Mountain, it continues as a series of interrupted collector and local streets. The Central Avenue Corridor, roughly from Camelback Road to McDowell Road, is one of Phoenix's most heavily trafficked stretches of roadway. The Central Avenue Corridor bisects the area known as Midtown, Phoenix, a collection of neighborhoods north of Downtown and south of the North-Central and Sunnyslope areas.

For the most part, Central Avenue marks the "zero" point of east/west addresses in the Phoenix area.

=== Chandler Boulevard ===
Chandler Boulevard
- Location: Phoenix; Chandler

Chandler Boulevard is an east–west arterial road in the southeastern part of the Phoenix metropolitan area. The road extends from Shaughnessey Road in the Ahwatukee Foothills village of Phoenix east through Gilbert Road in Chandler.

Chandler Boulevard begins at the eastern terminus of Shaughnessey Road in the Ahwatukee Foothills village of Phoenix as a two-lane road. After passing 17th Avenue, the road expands to four-lanes and continues through Phoenix until reaching the Interstate 10, where it continues into Chandler. The road continues for over four miles before intersecting with the Loop 101, passing by the Chandler Fashion Center. The road continues for another six miles, including an intersection with the Arizona State Route 87 (Arizona Avenue) in Downtown Chandler. The road continues into Williams Field Road after reaching the city of Gilbert.

=== Chandler Heights Road ===
Chandler Heights Road
- Location: Chandler; Gilbert; Queen Creek; San Tan Valley

Chandler Heights Road is an east–west arterial road in the southeastern part of the Phoenix metropolitan area. The highway extends from Alma School Road in Chandler east through San Tan Valley.

Chandler Heights Road begins at Alma School Road in Chandler as a four-lane highway and intersects Arizona State Route 87 (Arizona Avenue). The highway leaves Chandler at Val Vista Drive where it continues through Gilbert for four miles. After crossing Power Road, the highway continues through Queen Creek, Arizona where it continues for three miles until Ellsworth Road, where it continues into a neighborhood before ending at Poco Calle.

Chandler Heights Road continues again in San Tan Valley in another neighborhood, before continuing for another mile and a half until its eastern terminus at Kenworthy Road.

=== Chaparral Road ===
Chaparral Road
- Location: Scottsdale; Salt River Pima–Maricopa Indian Community

Chaparral Road is an east–west arterial road in the eastern part of the Phoenix metropolitan area. The road starts at Invergordon Road in Scottsdale. Continuing east and passes the Chaparral Park. At the Loop 101, it crosses in the Salt River Pima–Maricopa Indian Community and passes Scottsdale Community College. The road continues for three and a half more miles until ending at Center Street.

=== Citrus Road ===
Citrus Road
- Location: Goodyear; Citrus Park; Waddell; Surprise

Citrus Road is a north–south arterial road in the western part of the Phoenix metropolitan area. The road starts at Broadway Road in Goodyear, continuing in Goodyear for eight miles, passing the Interstate 10. At Camelback Road, the highway transitions into Citrus Park. At Northern Avenue, the highway transitions into Waddell for two more miles, before ending a stretch at Peoria Avenue.

Beginning another stretch at Cactus Road, the road transitions into Surprise where it continues a stretch for a mile until Waddell Road. The road briefly continues for half a mile from Lundberg Street until Traditions Loop.

Another stretch continues for almost two miles starting at Williams Road until Happy Valley Road.

=== Combs Road ===
Combs Road
- Location: Queen Creek; San Tan Valley

Combs Road is an east–west arterial road in the southeastern part of the Phoenix metropolitan area. It begins at the eastern terminus of Riggs Road at the Gary Road / Rittenhouse Road intersection in Queen Creek. The highway continues solely in Queen Creek for one mile, and after reaching Gantzel Road, the highway stays on the Queen Creek-San Tan Valley borderline for one more mile. At Kenworthy Road, the highway transitions solely in San Tan Valley, where it stays for two more miles.

=== Cooper Road ===
Cooper Road
- Location: Chandler; Gilbert

Cooper Road is a north–south arterial road in the southeastern part of the Phoenix metropolitan area. It begins at Hunt Highway in Chandler, going north. The road continues this stretch for four miles until reaching Queen Creek Road. The road takes a break due to the obstructions of the Chandler Municipal Airport.

The road continues again at Germann Road, crossing the Loop 202, and continuing solely in Chandler for two and a half miles, before the road reaches the Chandler-Gilbert borderline. The road fully transitions into Gilbert after one mile on the borderline.

The road continues in Gilbert for three and a half miles, before the road continues on as Stapley Road in Mesa.

=== Cotton Lane ===
Cotton Lane
- Location: Goodyear; Glendale; Surprise

Cotton Lane is a north–south arterial road in the western part of the Phoenix metropolitan area. The road starts at Estrella Parkway and continues in Goodyear for eleven miles. Shortly before Van Buren Street, the road briefly breaks into an eastbound and westbound path between the Arizona State Route 303. At McDowell Road, the road continues as its own path again. At Bethany Home Road, the road continues into Glendale for four miles. At Peoria Avenue, the road continues in Surprise for five miles before it transitions into Palm View Drive.

=== Country Club Drive ===
Country Club Drive
- Location: Mesa; Gilbert; Salt River Pima–Maricopa Indian Community
- Length: 7.1 mi (11.4 km)

Country Club Drive is a north–south arterial road in the southeastern part of the Phoenix metropolitan area. The highway comprises the portion of Arizona State Route 87 (SR 87) within the city of Mesa. The entire length of Country Club Drive is part of the National Highway System as a principal arterial.

Country Club Drive begins at the Western Canal at the south city limit of Mesa; SR 87 continues south into the city of Chandler as Arizona Avenue. Country Club Drive heads north as a six-lane road with center turn lane that becomes a divided highway at the south end of the S-curve in which the highway intersects Baseline Road. North of Baseline Road, the highway has a diamond interchange with U.S. Route 60 (Superstition Freeway). At the southwest corner of downtown Mesa, Country Club Drive has a one-quadrant interchange with Broadway Road and then immediately passes under the Union Pacific Railroad's Phoenix Subdivision. West of downtown, the highway intersects Main Street and the Valley Metro Rail light rail immediately to the west of its Country Club/Main Street station. The road continues north, passing the Mesa Country Club and Riverview High School. North of McKellips Road, Country Club Drive has a diamond interchange with SR 202 (Red Mountain Freeway) and reaches its northern terminus at SR 87's bridge across the Salt River. SR 87 continues north along Beeline Highway.

Country Club Drive continues another stretch in the Salt River Pima–Maricopa Indian Community starting at Oak Street, where it stays for two and a half miles before ending at Chaparral Road at Salt River Elementary School.

=== Crismon Road ===
Crismon Road
- Location: Queen Creek; Mesa

Crismon Road is a north–south arterial road in the southeastern part of the Phoenix metropolitan area. It begins at Riggs Road in Queen Creek, and goes north, passing by Crismon High School, it continues into a neighborhood, ending that stretch there.

The next stretch begins at Ocotillo Road, where it continues in Queen Creek for two more miles. After crossing Germann Road, the highway fully goes into Mesa, where it ends a stretch at Pecos Road. The next stretch continues slightly south of Williams Field Road, as the road goes through the neighborhood of Eastmark, ending a stretch at Ray Road.

The next stretch continues at Elliot Road, going north, until reaching a dead end. The road continues slightly north, passing Desert Ridge High School. The road later crosses the U.S. Route 60, passes Skyline High School, and crosses Apache Trail; the highway continues going north until reaching McKellips Road.

== D ==
=== Dean Road ===
Dean Road
- Location: Buckeye

Dean Road is a north–south arterial road in the western part of the Phoenix metropolitan area. It begins in Buckeye at Beloat Road. The road continues north for five miles ending at Yuma Road.

=== Deer Valley Road ===
Deer Valley Road
- Location: Surprise; Sun City West; Peoria; Glendale; Phoenix; Scottsdale

Deer Valley Road is an east–west arterial road in the northern part of the Phoenix metropolitan area. It begins its first stretch at 195th Avenue in Surprise, continuing east for three and a half miles, before ending a stretch at Grand Avenue. The next stretch begins in Sun City West just west of Sonora Lane, and continues four miles east before ending at Old El Mirage Road. The next stretch continues at 117th Avenue, at the eastern terminus of Williams Drive. It continues east into Peoria for four and a half miles, passing south of Liberty High School. At 75th Avenue, the road continues into Glendale, for two miles, ending a stretch at 59th Avenue. It begins slightly west of 35th Avenue, in the Phoenix urban village of Deer Valley, continuing for almost six miles, passing the Interstate 17 and the Phoenix Deer Valley Airport. Slightly west of Cave Creek Road, the road transitions into the Desert View urban village for five and a half miles, where it continues until 60th Street. Another stretch continues in Scottsdale, for a mile, starting at Scottsdale Road and ending at 79th Street.

=== Dobbins Road ===
Dobbins Road
- Location: Gila River Indian Community; Phoenix

Dobbins Road is an east–west arterial road in the southcentral part of the Phoenix metropolitan area. The highway extends from 83rd Avenue on the Gila River Indian Community south of Maricopa Village through the Laveen urban village of Phoenix, eventually crossing the Arizona State Route 202 continuing east of Laveen, and continuing through the South Mountain urban village and ends slightly east of 16th Avenue at Heard Scout Pueblo.

=== Dobson Road ===
Dobson Road
- Location: Sun Lakes; Chandler; Mesa; Salt River Pima–Maricopa Indian Community; Scottsdale

Dobson Road is a north–south arterial road in the southeastern part of the Phoenix metropolitan area. It begins at Hunt Highway in Sun Lakes, and is an arterial road for over a mile, before transitioning into a neighborhood and ending a stretch at Arrowvale Drive, before another stretch continues in the same neighborhood at Sunridge Drive, continuing north until exiting the neighborhood and continuing as an arterial road through Chandler, where it stays for nine miles. There are many landmarks during the route including the Intel Ocotillo Campus, the Loop 202, and Chandler Regional Medical Center. At the Western Canal, the highway transitions into Mesa. The highway continues in Mesa for six miles, and passes Dobson Ranch, the U.S. Route 60, Banner Desert Medical Center, Mesa Community College, Historic U.S. Route 80 (with Valley Metro Rail's Sycamore/Main Street station one block to the east), Tri-City Pavilions, Mesa Riverview, and Riverview Park, before the highway ends a stretch at the north Loop 202.

Another stretch continues in the Salt River Pima–Maricopa Indian Community at McKellips Road, and continues for over five miles, ending a stretch slightly north of McDonald Drive. The next stretch continues at Talking Stick Way, passing Talking Stick Resort, continuing for over a mile, ending slightly north of Via de Ventura, providing an entrance for OdySea Aquarium.

== E ==
=== Elliot Road ===
Elliot Road
- Location: Rainbow Valley; Goodyear; Gila River Indian Community; Phoenix; Tempe; Chandler; Gilbert; Mesa

Elliot Road is an east–west arterial road in the southeastern part of the Phoenix metropolitan area. The highway extends from Airport Road in Rainbow Valley, east through Goodyear, the Gila River Indian Community, Phoenix, Tempe, Chandler, Gilbert, and Mesa to Meridian Road at the Maricopa–Pinal county line. Elliot Road is part of the National Highway System as a principal arterial from Interstate 10 (I-10) at the Phoenix–Tempe border east to Arizona State Route 202 (SR 202) in Mesa.

Elliot Road begins in Rainbow Valley, at Airport Road, where it continues east for two miles before leaving Rainbow Valley, and crossing into the Estrella community in Goodyear, ending at Estrella Parkway.

Another stretch begins at 75th Avenue on the Gila River Indian Community, crossing the Laveen urban village of the city of Phoenix, and Arizona State Route 202, continuing east until ending a stretch slightly east of 51st Avenue.

It begins another stretch at 44th Street in the Ahwatukee urban village of the city of Phoenix. The road loops southwest as Elliot Warner Loop, which curves counterclockwise to Warner Road, which parallels Elliot Road 1 mile (1.6 km) to the south. Eliott Road begins as a four-lane road with center turn lane but expands to a six-lane divided highway at 48th Street. The highway leaves Phoenix and enters Tempe at its diamond interchange with I-10 (Maricopa Freeway). Within Tempe, Elliot Road intersects Rural Road. The highway meets SR 101 (Price Freeway) at a diamond interchange and enters Chandler, where the highway reduces to a four-lane road with center turn lane. Elliot Road intersects SR 87 (Arizona Avenue) 0.5 miles (0.80 km) west of the Union Pacific Railroad's Phoenix Subdivision, which forms the Chandler–Gilbert border. Within Gilbert, the highway passes the historic Gilbert Elementary School building and Gilbert High School. At the Eastern Canal, Elliot Road becomes divided again, which the road stays until midway between Recker Road and Power Road. The highway continues with two lanes through Power Road, where the highway enters Mesa. Elliot Road crosses the East Maricopa Floodway and expands to a six-lane divided highway at its diamond interchange with SR 202 (Santan Freeway). In Mesa, the highway passes Arizona General Hospital. The highway's median becomes a center turn lane shortly before the road reaches its eastern terminus at Meridian Road at the east city limit of Mesa, also the Maricopa–Pinal county line.

=== Ellsworth Road ===
Ellsworth Road
- Location: Queen Creek; Mesa

Ellsworth Road is a north–south arterial road in the southeastern part of the Phoenix metropolitan area. The highway extends from Hunt Highway in Queen Creek to Usery Pass Road, north of Mesa.

Ellsworth Road begins in Queen Creek, at the western terminus of Hunt Highway, For over two miles, the highway continues, passing Pegasus Airpark. North of Chandler Heights Road, the highway breaks into two different roads, Ellsworth Loop Road and Ellsworth Road, Ellsworth Loop Road continues as a six-lane highway for almost two miles, passing through Queen Creek Marketplace, where Ellsworth Road is now a two-lane highway and passes through Queen Creek Historical Town Hall and Founders' Park, both roads also provide entrances for the Queen Creek Library. Ellsworth Road continues until Walnut Road, which acts as a connecting point for the two roads where Ellsworth Loop Road turns back into Ellsworth Road.

Ellsworth Road continues in Queen Creek for another mile, and enters Mesa after passing Germann Road, where it continues as a four-lane highway. It passes by Bell Bank Park and intersects with Arizona State Route 24 (SR 24; Gateway Freeway). Ellsworth Road continues and has a diamond interchange with U.S. Route 60 (Superstition Freeway). After six more miles, Ellsworth Road ends and continues as Usery Pass Road to Bush Highway.

=== Empire Boulevard ===
Empire Boulevard
- Location: Queen Creek; San Tan Valley

Empire Boulevard is an east–west arterial road in the southeastern part of the Phoenix metropolitan area. It begins at Hawes Road in Queen Creek. To the west, the road continues as Hunt Highway. Empire Boulevard runs east, passing Pegasus Airpark. At Gary Road, the highway transitions into San Tan Valley, where the road continues in a neighborhood, ending at Gantzel Road.

It begins at the eastern terminus of Riggs Road at the Gary Road / Rittenhouse Road intersection in Queen Creek. The highway continues solely in Queen Creek for one mile, and after reaching Gantzel Road, the highway stays on the Queen Creek-San Tan Valley borderline for one more mile. At Kenworthy Road, the highway transitions solely in San Tan Valley, where it stays for two more miles.

== G ==
=== Gantzel Road ===
Gantzel Road
- Location: San Tan Valley

Gantzel Road is a north–south arterial road, serving primarily the town of San Tan Valley. Starting at its northern terminus with Ocotillo Road and Ironwood Drive, the route continues south, as an arterial, through San Tan Valley. As it travels through developed lands, it primarily serves as a road to connect residential neighborhoods off of the main arterial. However, at an intersection with Combs Road, the route is home to a large number of businesses and Banner Ironwood Medical Center. Continuing south, the road continues traveling through the town, before intersecting Empire Street. South of the intersection, the route curves southeast, now traveling through undeveloped land. In the 3 mile stretch from Empire Street to Bella Vista Road, there is not a single developed business, house, or road to speak of, aside from Poston Butte High School. South of Poston Butte and Bella Vista, the route travels through residential communities in San Tan Valley. The route meets its southern terminus at Hunt Highway, where it continues southwest as Johnson Ranch Boulevard, to serve the San Tan Highlands Golf Course and the surrounding neighborhood.

=== Germann Road ===
Germann Road
- Location: Chandler; Gilbert; Queen Creek; Mesa; San Tan Valley

Germann Road is an east–west arterial road in the southeastern part of the Phoenix metropolitan area. The highway extends from Price Road in Chandler east through Rittenhouse Road in Queen Creek, again from Sossaman Road on the Queen Creek and Mesa borderline to Schnepf Road in San Tan Valley.

Germann Road begins at Price Road in Chandler, where it continues east as a four-lane highway for three miles until it intersects with Arizona State Route 87 (Arizona Avenue), where it turns into a six-lane highway, where it continues through Chandler for another three miles, passing the Chandler Municipal Airport. At Gilbert Road, the highway continues through Gilbert for another six miles. At Power Road, the highway continues into Queen Creek, where it ends a stretch at Rittenhouse Road. And continues again as a two-lane highway at Sossaman Road on the Queen Creek and Mesa border for five miles. At Meridian Road, the highway continues solely in Queen Creek for another mile until Ironwood Road, where it continues in San Tan Valley for another two miles, passing Combs High School.

=== Gilbert Road ===
Gilbert Road
- Location: Gila River Indian Community; Chandler; Gilbert; Mesa; Salt River Pima–Maricopa Indian Community

Gilbert Road is a north–south arterial road in the southeastern part of the Phoenix metropolitan area. The highway extends from a southern point of Arizona State Route 87 south of Chandler to Beeline Highway, north of Mesa.

Gilbert Road begins on the Gila River Indian Community at a southern point of Arizona State Route 87. Stotonic Road continues south from here to Lower Santan Village. After passing by Gila River Resorts and Casino, the highway continues and passes through Chandler for five miles, where after Germann Road, the highway follows the border between the city of Chandler to the west, and the city of Gilbert to the east, and has a diamond interchange with Arizona State Route 202 (SR 202; Santan Freeway). After passing Galveston Street, the highway leaves Chandler and continues fully through Gilbert and passes through Downtown Gilbert. At Baseline Road, the highway enters Mesa and has a diamond interchange with U.S. Route 60 (Superstition Freeway).

Gilbert Road continues through Mesa for seven miles and south of McDowell Road, has a partial interchange with SR 202 (Red Mountain Freeway) allowing access to and from the west; access to the other direction of SR 202 is provided by McDowell Road. Gilbert Road continues through north of Mesa and ends at Beeline Highway on the Salt River Pima–Maricopa Indian Community.

=== Goldfield Road ===
Goldfield Road
- Location: Apache Junction

Goldfield Road is a north–south arterial road in the southeastern part of the Phoenix metropolitan area. It begins at Baseline Avenue in Apache Junction, and passes the U.S. Route 60. The highway continues for four miles, ending at Lost Dutchman Boulevard.

=== Grand Avenue ===
Grand Avenue
- Location: Sun City West; Surprise; El Mirage; Youngtown; Sun City; Peoria; Glendale; Phoenix

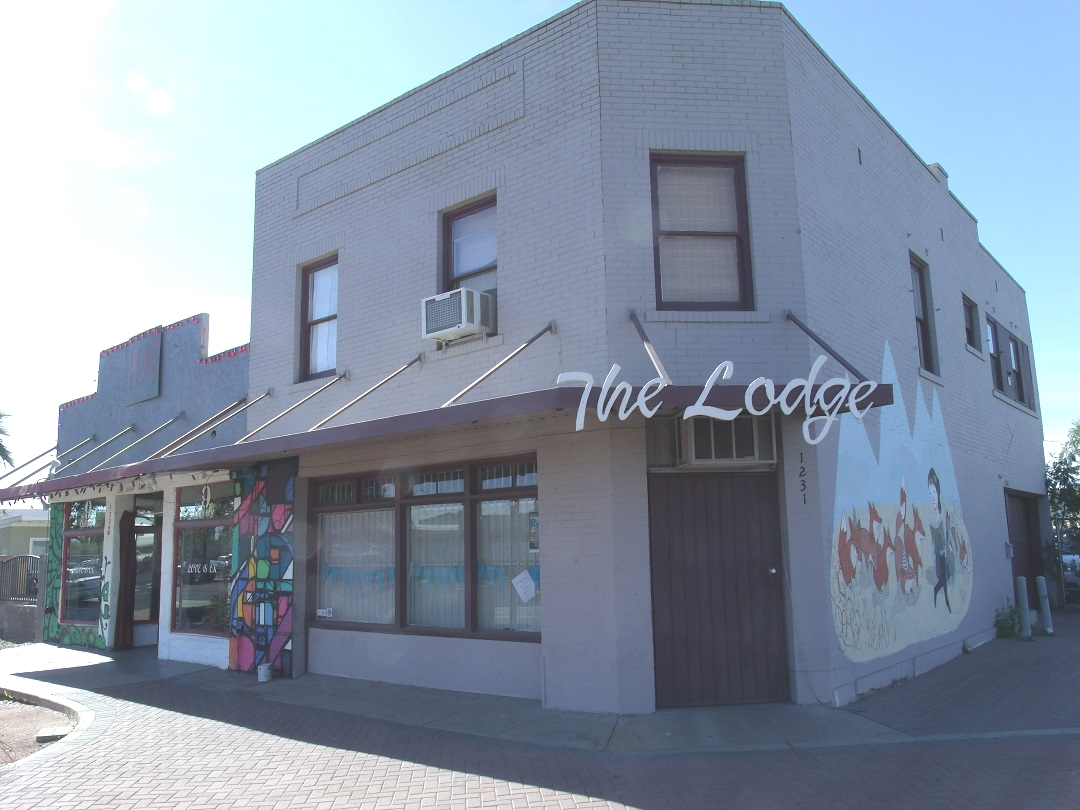
Rehbein Grocery, built in 1920 and located at 1227-1231 Grand Ave. Listed in the National Register of Historic Places, reference:#85002895.

The portion of U.S. Route 60 that enters Phoenix from the northwest Valley is known as Grand Avenue, a street which slices through west Phoenix at a 45-degree angle. This makes it instantly recognizable on any City of Phoenix map, and it represents the final leg of US 60 into the heart of Phoenix. It passes Banner Del E Webb Medical Center in Sun City West, Banner Boswell Medical Center in Sun City, and Peoria High School (at 83rd Avenue in Peoria). Although US 60 departs Grand Avenue at an interchange with 27th Avenue, Grand Avenue itself continues southeast towards the intersection of 7th Avenue and Van Buren Street. The BNSF Railway's Phoenix Subdivision parallels Grand Avenue until it turns south at 19th Avenue.

As of 2006, Lower Grand Avenue, between Roosevelt Street on the north and Van Buren Street on the south, has been experiencing a renaissance, as art venues, bars, cafes and small businesses have emerged amid the work being done to restore historic properties, including decaying warehouses.

On the first and third Fridays of every month, Grand Avenue hosts cultural events. Some of the venues associated with the Grand Avenue art scene include the Trunk Space, the Lodge Art Parlor, ShopDevious, the Icon Gallery, the Chocolate Factory, the Paisley Violin, La Melgosa Complex: Deus Ex Machina, the Phoenix Fall Space, Stop n' Look & Comet's Corner, the Annex: Soul Invictus, the Lucky Rabbit & Gallery Marsiglia, Lady Luck Tattoo, and other design houses and studios.

As a result of this revitalization the Grand Avenue Merchants Association (GAMA) formed to address a "Grand New Vision" and to bring the Grand Avenue community together with other neighborhood associations to form an arts, culture and small business district with a mind towards adaptive reuse of historical buildings, infill projects and both small business and community based outreach.

In 2011, the City of Phoenix was chosen as one of five U.S. capitals to receive federal design assistance through the U.S. Environmental Protection Agency (EPA) Greening America's Capitals program, with the goal of creating a more environmentally and economically sustainable design along the lower Grand Avenue corridor.

=== Greenfield Road ===
Greenfield Road
- Location: Gilbert; Mesa

Greenfield Road is a north–south arterial road in the southeastern part of the Phoenix metropolitan area. It begins at Chandler Heights Road in Gilbert, continuing north for four miles. At Pecos Road, the main arterial road transitions in San Tan Village Parkway. However, Greenfield Road breaks into a back road, just east of Discovery Park. It ends a stretch at Canyon Creek Drive, before starting another stretch at Williams Field Road, where it continues for almost a mile.

Another stretch continues at Knox Road as San Tan Village Parkway ends its northern terminus. The highway continues in Gilbert for another three and a half miles before transitioning in Mesa at Baseline Road. The highway passes the U.S. Route 60 and continues in Mesa for seven miles. It later passes Falcon Field Airport, ends its run at the Loop 202.

=== Guadalupe Road ===
Guadalupe Road
- Location: Phoenix; Guadalupe; Tempe; Mesa; Gilbert; Apache Junction

Guadalupe Road is an east–west arterial road in the southeastern part of the Phoenix metropolitan area. The highway extends from Pointe Parkway in the Ahwatukee Foothills village of Phoenix and continues east. After crossing the Interstate 10, the highway continues through the town of Guadalupe for almost a mile. After passing Highline Lateral Canal Trail, the highway continues into Tempe for three and a half miles, and after passing through Loop 101, the highway leaves Tempe and continues through Mesa for three miles. The highway passes Arizona State Route 87 (Country Club Drive), where the highway leaves Mesa and continues through Gilbert for nine miles. At Power Road, the highway continues back into Mesa, where it passes through Loop 202 until Signal Butte Road, where the highway enters through a neighborhood and ends a stretch at S Yellow Wood. Guadalupe Road continues again as a back road in Apache Junction, and continues for a mile east until reaching Ironwood Drive.

== H ==
=== Happy Valley Road ===
Happy Valley Road
- Location: Surprise; Peoria; Phoenix; Scottsdale

Happy Valley Road is an east–west arterial road in the northern part of the Phoenix metropolitan area. The highway extends from 163rd Avenue in Surprise east to Seventh Street in Phoenix. Happy Valley Road is part of the National Highway System as a principal arterial from SR 303 to Interstate 17 (I-17).

Happy Valley Road begins at 163rd Avenue in Surprise. It travels east for six miles before intersecting Loop 303 (Bob Stump Memorial Parkway) at a single-point urban interchange in an unincorporated area west of Peoria. Happy Valley Road expands to six lanes east of Loop 303 and crosses the Agua Fria River into the city of Peoria. The highway intersects Lake Pleasant Parkway and passes along the south flank of Sunrise Mountain before crossing the New River. Shortly after entering the Deer Valley urban village of the city of Phoenix, Happy Valley Road becomes a four-lane road with center turn lane and passes to the south of Ludden Mountain. The highway expands to six lanes, crosses Skunk Creek, and meets I-17 (Arizona Veterans Highway) at a diverging diamond interchange. Happy Valley Road continues east from I-17 as a six-lane divided highway but then reduces to two lanes east of 19th Street. The highway crosses the Central Arizona Project aqueduct before curving south toward its end, where it seamlessly becomes Seventh Street.

An additional part of Happy Valley Road starts at Scottsdale Road in Scottsdale, continuing east past the Troon Country Club and loops around Troon Mountain, ending at Ranch Gate Road where it continues as Nineteenth Street.

=== Hawes Road ===
Hawes Road
- Location: Queen Creek; Mesa

Hawes Road is a north–south arterial road in the southeastern part of the Phoenix metropolitan area. It begins at Hunt Highway/Empire Boulevard in Queen Creek, at the northern terminus of Wild Horse Drive. Hawes Road continues its first stretch in Queen Creek for four and a half miles, passing Desert Mountain Park, ending at Rittenhouse Road.

The road briefly continues in a neighborhood at Ryan Road, going north until Germann Road. The road has another stretch in Mesa, beginning at Ray Road, and continuing until crossing the Loop 202. Another stretch continues north at Elliot Road, going for two more miles until Baseline Road.

Another stretch continues slightly south of Southern Avenue, continuing until Main Street, and another stretch continues slightly north and continues in a neighborhood.

At McKellips Road, yet another stretch continues for another mile and half before ending.

=== Hayden Road ===
Hayden Road
- Location: Scottsdale

Hayden Road is a north–south arterial road in the eastern part of the Phoenix metropolitan area. It begins at McKellips Road, where the highway transitions into McClintock Drive going south into Tempe. It continues north to Frank Lloyd Wright Boulevard, passing by Chaparral Lake and Saguaro High School and through McCormick Ranch. A second segment continues north from the intersection of Frank Lloyd Wright Boulevard and Greenway Hayden Loop past TPC Scottsdale and across Loop 101 to Deer Valley Road, where it continues as Miller Road.

There are additional, smaller sections. The next section goes from Pinnacle Peak Road to Happy Valley Road. Another section goes from just south of Jomax Road to Dixileta Drive. A short section goes from Lone Mountain Road to Whisper Rock Trail. The northernmost section goes from south of Westland Road to Black Mountain Road.

=== Higley Road ===
Higley Road
- Location: Chandler Heights; Gilbert; Mesa

Higley Road is a north–south arterial road in the southeastern part of the Phoenix metropolitan area. It begins in the incorporated Chandler Heights area at Hunt Highway, where it continues north until reaching Gilbert at Riggs Road. During the twelve mile run in Gilbert, Higley Road passes many landmarks, including Gilbert Regional Park, Williams Field High School, and Banner Gateway Medial Center.

Just before crossing the U.S. Route 60, the highway transitions in Mesa, where it stays for seven miles, and eventually passes Falcon Field Airport. The road ends just north of Thomas Road.

=== Hunt Highway ===
Hunt Highway
- Location: Sun Lakes; Chandler; Chandler Heights; Queen Creek; San Tan Valley; Florence

Hunt Highway is a west–east arterial road in the southeastern part of the Phoenix metropolitan area. The highway extends from Old Price Road in Sun Lakes to Florence, ending at Arizona State Route 79.

Hunt Highway heads east as a two-lane road from Old Price Road, which follows the Maricopa–Pinal county line, through the southern point of Sun Lakes, where after three miles, the highway intersects with Arizona State Route 87 and Arizona State Route 587. Following east for five miles, the highway continues at the southern point of Chandler, eventually passing by Gila River Resorts and Casino, the highway ends a stretch at Val Vista Drive. Two miles east, the highway continues at the southern terminus of Higley Road, where it follows through the border of unincorporated Chandler Heights and city of Queen Creek. Upon reaching Hawes Road, the highway ends this stretch as it turns into Empire Boulevard.

Hunt Highway continues at the southern terminus of Ellsworth Road as a four-lane highway as it passes through the town of San Tan Valley for nine miles. After passing Arizona Farms Road, the highway leaves San Tan Valley and continues through an unincorporated area as a two-lane highway, before reaching Florence as a six-lane highway, it continues in Florence for another eight miles before reaching an eastern terminus at Arizona State Route 79.

== I ==
=== Idaho Road ===
Idaho Road
- Location: Apache Junction

Idaho Road is a north–south arterial road in the southeastern part of the Phoenix metropolitan area. It begins at Baseline Avenue in Apache Junction, and passes the U.S. Route 60 and Prospector Park. The highway continues for six miles and ends at McDowell Boulevard.

=== Indian School Road ===
Indian School Road
- Location: Buckeye; Goodyear; Litchfield Park; Avondale; Phoenix; Scottsdale; Salt River Pima–Maricopa Indian Community

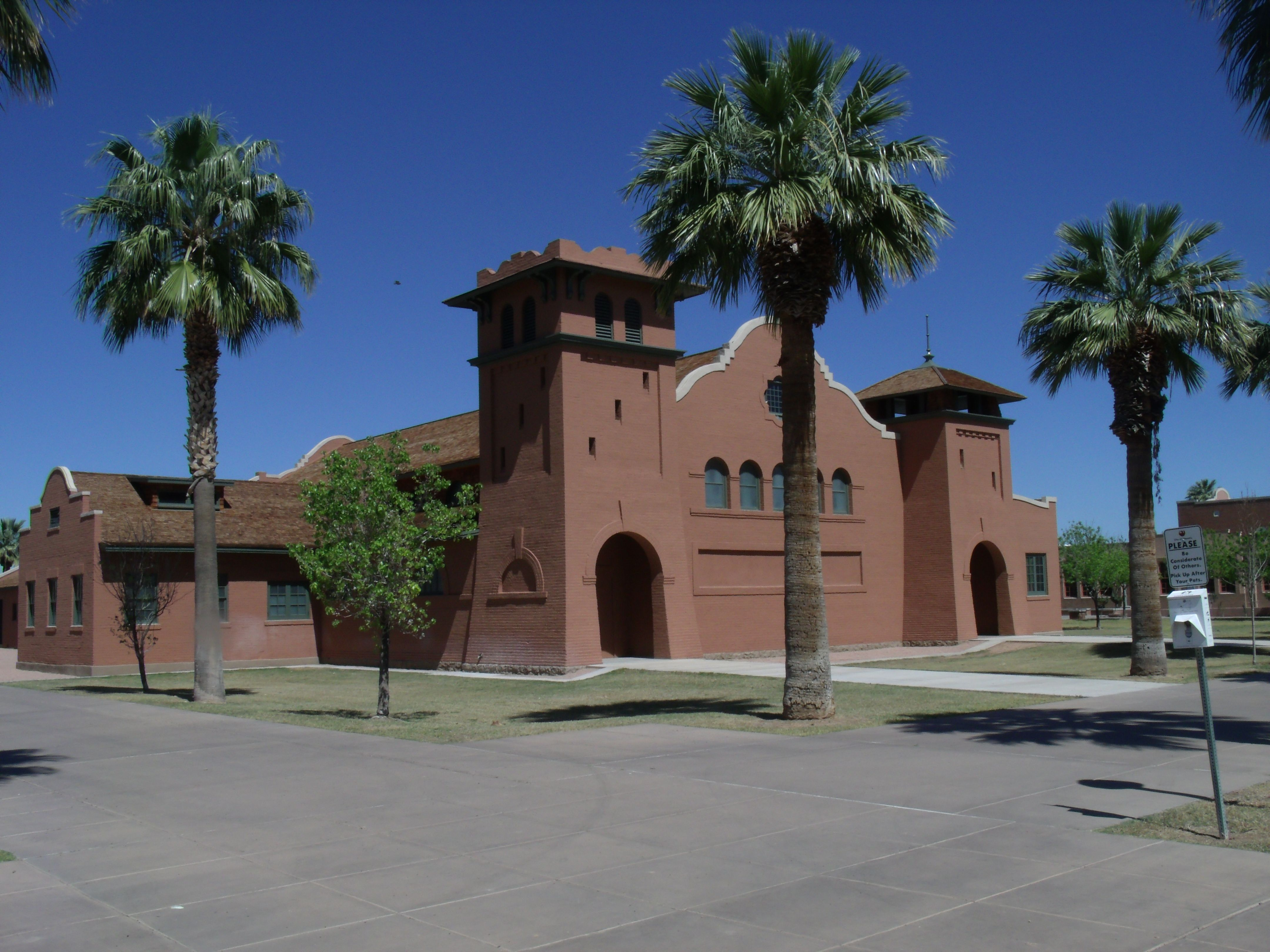
Historic Phoenix Indian School

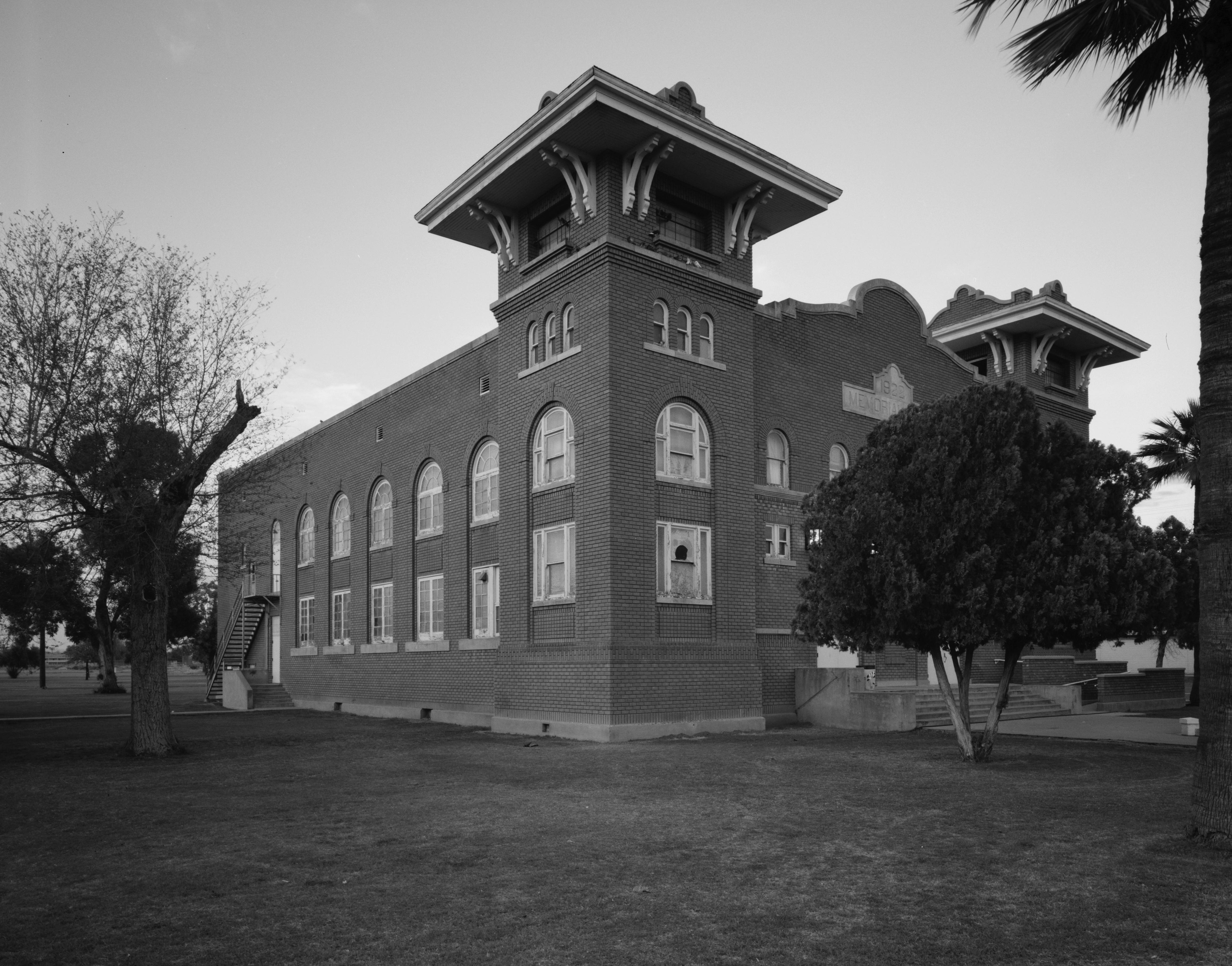
The mission-revival style Memorial Hall, built in 1922 as part of the Phoenix Indian School

Indian School Road runs continuously east/west for approximately 41 miles with the Salt River Pima-Maricopa Indian Community at the east end and Buckeye & Maricopa County White Tank Mountain Regional Park at the west end. It intersects with Arizona State Route 101, Arizona State Route 51, Interstate 17, US 60/Grand Avenue and Arizona State Route 303. Though running predominantly through the metro Phoenix area, Indian School Road does continue west of the White Tank Mountains from approximately 27600 West to 41100 West (411th Avenue being an overpass and access to Tonopah and Interstate 10) to 46700 West, and from 48700 West to Harquahala Valley Road (52000 West).

Indian School Road was named in territorial days as the road to the Phoenix Indian School (1890–1991) located on the site of the present Steele Indian School Park.

==== Landmarks ====
- Arcadia High School, 4703 East. Past students include Steven Spielberg, Lynda Carter and astronaut Bill Shepherd.
- Carl Hayden Veterans Administration Medical Center, 650 East, named after Arizona's first representative (1912–27) and US senator from Arizona (1927–1969).
- Steele Indian School Park, 300 East. Original site of the Phoenix Indian School; there are historical buildings that were once part of the Indian School campus, specifically the Dining Hall, built in 1902, and Memorial Hall, built in 1922. More recently, this was the site of a fatal helicopter crash on July 27, 2007, when KTVK and KNXV choppers collided during a police chase, and wreckage landed in the park.
- Phoenix Airhaven Airport, 2700-3300 West, was located on the south side of the road from 1945 to early in the 1960s. It is now an industrial office complex.
- Maryvale Mall, 5100 West. Now closed, the site consists of two schools (an elementary and a middle) utilizing former buildings of the mall. A nearby Walmart Supercenter was built with a new structure.
- Verrado High School, 20050 West

=== Ironwood Drive ===
Ironwood Drive
- Location: San Tan Valley; Queen Creek; Apache Junction

Ironwood Drive is a north–south arterial road, serving east valley communities such as San Tan Valley and Queen Creek. Starting at its southern terminus with Ocotillo Road and Gantzel Road, the route continues north, as an arterial, through much of San Tan Valley. It has an at-grade intersection with SR 24 at the highway's eastern terminus, before continuing through more undeveloped land. The undeveloped land abruptly turns into developed land, at an intersection with Baseline Avenue in Apache Junction. Half a mile north, the road intersects with the Superstition Freeway, north of the freeway, the route encounters many more fellow arterials, having intersections with Southern Avenue, Broadway Avenue, and the Apache Trail en route through Apache Junction. North of an intersection with Lost Duchman Boulevard, the road travels once again through undeveloped land. When the re-enters developed land at an intersection with McKellips Road, the road becomes much more residential in nature, narrowing to two lanes, and having houses alongside it. The route continues through the residential development for another mile, before ending at an intersection with McDowell Road. Future housing developments in Apache Junction could see the road be extended further north, but the nearby Usery Mountains would limit the size of any such developments.

== K ==
=== Kyrene Road ===
Kyrene Road
- Location: Gila River Indian Community; Chandler; Tempe

Kyrene Road is a north–south arterial road in the southeastern part of the Phoenix metropolitan area. The highway begins half a mile south of Allison Road, in the Gila River Indian Community, passing Gila River Resorts & Casinos, and crossing the Loop 202 in Chandler, where it continues for two and a half miles, before continuing in Tempe, Arizona as an arterial road until Baseline Road, where it continues as a two-lane highway for one mile, ending at Southern Avenue.

== L ==
=== Lake Pleasant Parkway ===
Lake Pleasant Parkway
- Location: Peoria

Lake Pleasant Parkway is an arterial road in the northwestern part of the Phoenix metropolitan area. The highway extends from the intersection of 83rd Avenue and Beardsley Road west and north to Arizona State Route 74 (SR 74), all within Peoria. The entire length of Lake Pleasant Parkway is part of the National Highway System as a principal arterial, along with the 2-mile-long (3.2 km) section of 83rd Avenue from the southern end of Lake Pleasant Parkway south to Bell Road. The principal arterial segment of 83rd Avenue is also described in this section.

The principal arterial section of 83rd Avenue begins at Bell Road, which at that intersection forms the border of the cities of Peoria and Glendale. 83rd Avenue continues south fully into Peoria, where it serves the Peoria Sports Complex, the spring training home of the San Diego Padres and Seattle Mariners. From Bell Road, 83rd Avenue heads north fully into Glendale and passes to the west of Arrowhead Towne Center. The four-lane divided highway crosses over SR 101 (Agua Fria Freeway) without access; Bell Road has an interchange with the freeway just west of 83rd Avenue. 83rd Avenue parallels and then crosses the New River before reaching Union Hills Drive, which also provides access to SR 101. The avenue expands to six lanes as it continues into the city of Peoria to Beardsley Road, where the highway continues as Lake Pleasant Parkway. The parkway curves west; within the curve is an intersection with another section of 83rd Avenue, where the parkway reduces to four lanes. Lake Pleasant Parkway continues west until 98th Avenue, where the highway curves north. North of Happy Valley Road, the highway's surroundings gradually change to open desert. North of its diamond interchange with SR 303, Lake Pleasant Parkway reduces to two lanes and crosses the Central Arizona Project aqueduct. The highway passes to the east of Pleasant Valley Airport before reaching its northern terminus at SR 74, which heads west as Lake Pleasant Road and east as Carefree Highway.

=== Lindsay Road ===
Lindsay Road
- Location: Chandler; Gilbert; Mesa

Lindsay Road is a north–south arterial road in the southeastern part of the Phoenix metropolitan area. It begins at Hunt Highway in Chandler, going north. The highway stays solely in Chandler for three miles. Once the highway crosses Ocotillo Road, the highway stays on the Chandler-Gilbert borderline until Queen Creek Road, where the highway stays solely in Gilbert, where it stays for nine miles. The highway crosses the Loop 202 just north of Germann Road. The highway later passes Freestone Park. After intersecting Baseline Road, the highway transitions into Mesa, where it stays for six miles, before ending its northern terminus at McDowell Road.

=== Lost Dutchman Boulevard ===
Lost Dutchman Boulevard
- Location: Apache Junction

Lost Dutchman Boulevard is an east–west arterial road in the southeastern part of the Phoenix metropolitan area. It starts at Meridian Road, at the eastern terminus of Brown Road. The highway continues in Apache Junction for four miles, ending at Goldfield Road.

=== Lower Buckeye Road ===
Lower Buckeye Road
- Location: Buckeye; Goodyear; Avondale; Phoenix

Lower Buckeye Road is an east–west arterial road in the central part of the Phoenix metropolitan area. It begins in the outskirts of town at Salome Highway for five miles before ending a stretch at 337th Avenue. It continues another stretch in Buckeye for four and a half miles, briefly ending after 223rd Avenue before continuing again at Dean Road, continuing in Buckeye for three and a half miles. At Perryville Road, the highway transitions into Goodyear, where it continues its stretch for four and half miles, ending at Bullard Avenue.

Due to Phoenix Goodyear Airport, Lower Buckeye Road doesn't continue again until MC 85, and at Litchfield Road, the highway transitions into Avondale, where it continues for four miles until 107th Avenue, where it transitions into the Estrella Village urban village of Phoenix, for eleven miles, and passes the Loop 202 on the way. Lower Buckeye Road ends its eastern terminus at 19th Avenue.

== M ==
=== Main Street (Mesa) ===
Main Street
- Location: Mesa

Main Street is an east–west arterial road in the southeastern part of the Phoenix metropolitan area. Its western terminus begins as Apache Boulevard ends its eastern terminus at Tempe Canal. Main Street begins eastward through the city of Mesa, and throughout its 13-mile run, runs into many landmarks, including Downtown Mesa, and East Valley Institute of Technology. The Valley Metro Rail continues through the median of Main Street, until ending at the Gilbert Road intersection. The highway continues east as Apache Trail after passing the Sossaman Road intersection.

=== McClintock Drive ===
McClintock Drive
- Location: Chandler; Tempe

McClintock Drive is a north–south arterial road in the southeastern part of the Phoenix metropolitan area. It begins at the Loop 202 in Chandler. The highway continues in Chandler for two and a half miles, before transitioning into Tempe. It later crosses the U.S. Route 60 and McClintock High School. Just before reaching the north Loop 202, the highway passes the Tempe Marketplace, and ends its northern terminus at McKellips Road, where the highway transitions into Hayden Road going into Scottsdale.

=== McDowell Road ===
McDowell Road
- Location: Buckeye; Goodyear; Avondale; Phoenix; Scottsdale; Salt River Pima-Maricopa Indian Community; Mesa; Apache Junction

McDowell Road is a central east–west arterial road in the Phoenix metropolitan area. It begins in Buckeye a mile west of Verrado Way. The road is currently under construction between Verrado Way and 202nd Avenue, but it continues as a two-lane highway at 202nd Avenue and continues into Goodyear at Perryville Road and later crosses the Loop 303. At Dysart Road, the highway transitions into Avondale, passing Friendship Park and transitions into the Tolleson-Phoenix borderline for two miles, where it passes the Loop 101. For the next seventeen miles, the highway continues solely in Phoenix, and passing many landmarks including the Interstate 17, the Arizona State Fair, the Arizona State Route 51, the northern terminus of the Arizona State Route 143, and the Papago Sports Complex.

Just east of Galvin Parkway / 64th Street, the highway transitions of Scottsdale for three miles. At Pima Road, the highway transitions into the Salt River Pima-Maricopa Indian Community for three miles, before ending a stretch at the Arizona State Route 87. At Mesa Drive, the highway stays on the border of the Salt River Pima-Maricopa Indian Community and Mesa for two miles. At Gilbert Road, the highway transitions in Mesa after providing access to the northbound Loop 202. For the next nine miles, the highway stays in Mesa, including passing Falcon Field Airport, and providing access to the southbound Loop 202. The highway ends its stretch at Ellsworth Road. The highway briefly continues in different parts of Apache Junction as McDowell Boulevard.

=== McKellips Road ===
McKellips Road
- Location: Tempe; Scottsdale; Salt River Pima-Maricopa Indian Community; Mesa; Apache Junction

McKellips Road is an east–west arterial road in the Phoenix metropolitan area. The highway extends slightly west of College Avenue in Tempe and continues east before reaching the Tempe-Scottsdale borderline for one mile. After intersecting with Hayden Road/McClintock Drive, the highway fully extends into Scottsdale for another mile. After passing the Loop 101, the highway extends into the Salt River Pima-Maricopa Indian Community for two and a half miles. And after crossing the Loop 202, the highway extends into Mesa, where it stays for thirteen and a half miles. In its run in Mesa, the highway encounters landmarks including Falcon Field Airport. The highway also crosses the Loop 202 once again, and ends its stretch in Mesa at Crismon Road.

The highway continues another stretch in Apache Junction, as McKellips Boulevard. It starts its stretch at Meridian Road and continues in Apache Junction for three and a half miles.

=== McQueen Road ===
McQueen Road
- Location: Chandler; Gilbert

McQueen Road is a north–south arterial road in the southeastern part of the Phoenix metropolitan area. It begins at Hunt Highway in Chandler, going north. The highway continues solely in Chandler for eight and a half miles until Knox Road, during the highway's time in Chandler, it passes Paseo Vista Recreation Area, Tumbleweed Park, which is the home of the annual Ostrich Festival, and later crosses the Loop 202. Once reaching Knox Road, the highway stays on the border of Chandler and Gilbert for almost a mile. Once the highway reaches Highland High School, the road stays completely in Gilbert for almost three miles until reaching Baseline Road, where the highway continues as Mesa Drive through Mesa.

=== Meridian Road ===
Meridian Road
- Location: Queen Creek; Mesa; Apache Junction

Meridian Road is a north–south arterial road in the southeastern part of the Phoenix metropolitan area. Mostly throughout the road's entire run, it stays on the border of Maricopa and Pinal County. The highway starts its run at Combs Road in Queen Creek, where it continues north. For four miles, the highway is solely in Queen Creek before crossing the Queen Creek-Mesa borderline, where it stays for a mile and a half until reaching the Arizona State Route 24, where it ends a stretch.

About half a mile north, Meridian Road briefly continues again on the Mesa-Apache Junction borderline for half a mile, ending the stretch at Williams Field Road.

A mile north, Meridian Road continues at Ray Road, where it continues for another two and a half miles before reaching a dead end.

Merididan Road continues fully in Apache Junction at Baseline Road, where it continues north for six miles, including passing the U.S. 60.

=== Mesa Drive ===
Mesa Drive
- Location: Mesa; Salt River Pima–Maricopa Indian Community

Mesa Drive is a north–south arterial road in the southeastern part of the Phoenix metropolitan area. The highway starts at Baseline Road, at the northern terminus of McQueen Road. The highway continues north passing the U.S. Route 60, for six miles, before ending a stretch at McDowell Road.

Another stretch continues at Arizona State Route 87 (Beeline Highway) in the Salt River Pima–Maricopa Indian Community for four and a half miles.

=== Mill Avenue ===
Mill Avenue
- Location: Tempe; Chandler

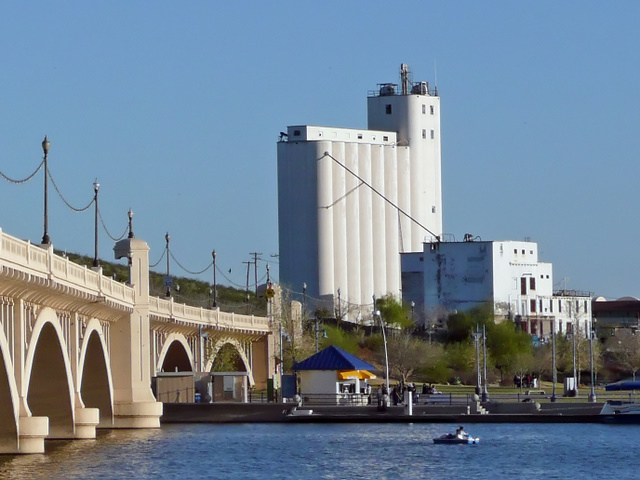
Named after Charles T. Hayden, the Hayden Mill lends its name to Mill Avenue in Tempe, AZ. In the foreground is Tempe Town Lake, a popular recreation area.

Mill Avenue is a historic street in Tempe. In north Tempe near Arizona State University, the street runs through a popular, pedestrian-friendly shopping and nightlife district. Mill Avenue was originally centered around the Hayden Flour Mill, which, while disused, still stands on the north end of the Avenue. Today, the avenue plays host to many bars, designer shopping stores, as well as many fairs, and city festivals. It was described in 2010 by a New York Times reporter as "a bohemian commercial strip next to Arizona State University".

At the northern end of the shopping district, the two Mill Avenue bridges cross the Salt River at Tempe Town Lake. One bridge was completed in 1931, the other in 1994.

==== History ====
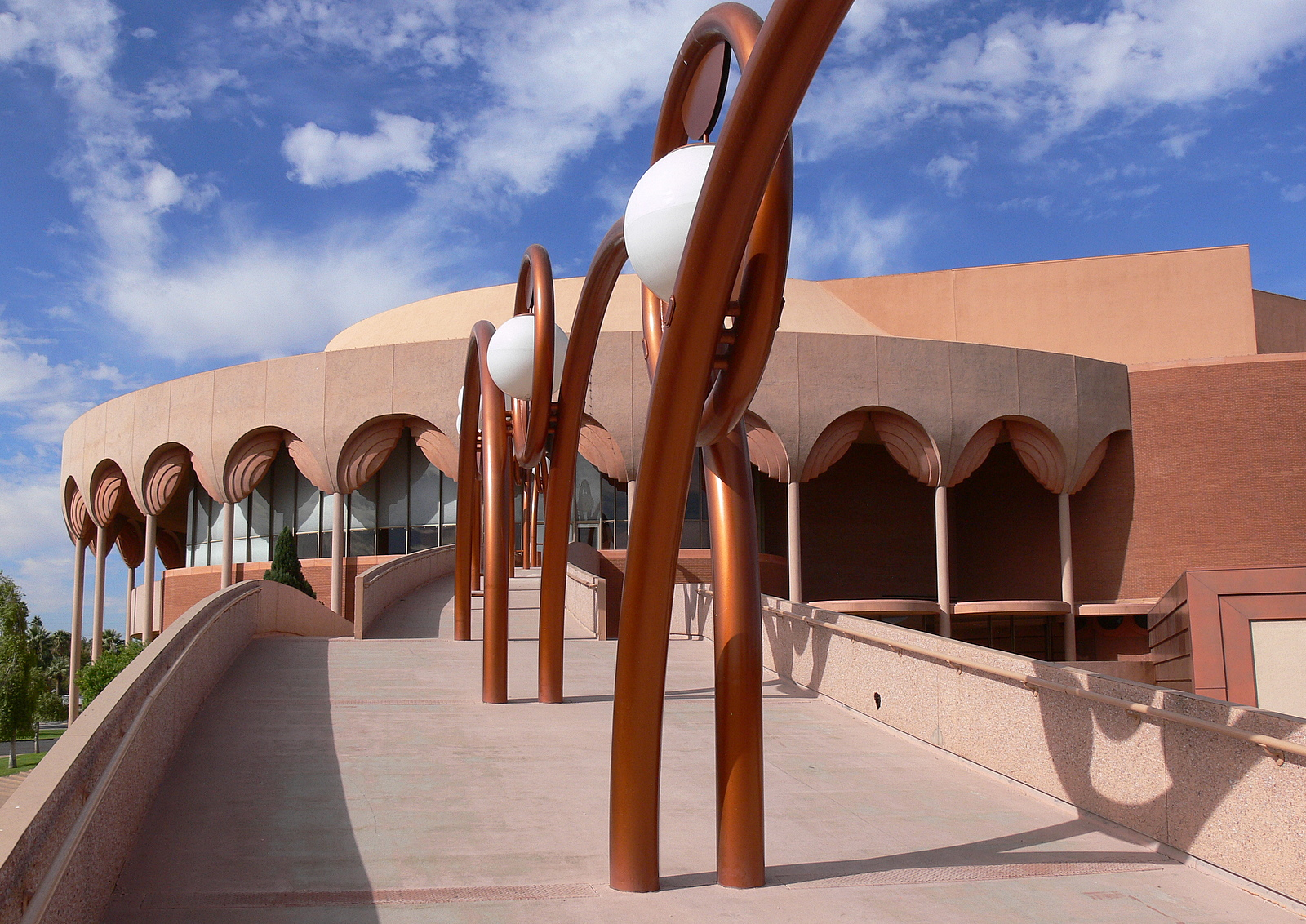
Grady Gammage Memorial Auditorium

After the founding of Fort McDowell on the east side of central Arizona's Salt River Valley in 1865, farmers moved into the area. These early settlers further developed the irrigation canals that the Hohokam people originally created and built new ones to carry Salt River water to their farms. Agriculture in the Salt River valley soon gave food to Arizona's military posts and mining towns. In 1871, Hiram C. Hodge commented that there were two stores and a population of about 100 in Tempe.

A substantial addition to the Tempe economy was established in 1877, when Charles T. Hayden, a business man from Connecticut, opened a flour-mill operation that was supplied with water from the Tempe Irrigating Canal. Charles T. Hayden, and his family operated the mill for three full generations, and it was crucial to Tempe's community industry.

Also in 1877, Charles' son Carl Hayden, who was to become a congressman and then senator from Arizona, was born in the Hayden family home, a building which, after spending around 60 years as a restaurant, began restoration to its 1924-era state in 2014.

The Hayden's Ferry Post Office was renamed the Tempe Post Office in 1879. In 1889, the new Phoenix and Maricopa Railroad linked Tempe with Phoenix. In 1894, the Maricopa County Board of Supervisors incorporated the town of Tempe. Tempe finally became a city after being inhabited for over 30 years.

In 1962, the Laird and Dines Drug Store closed after 68 years of operation at the corner of Mill Avenue and Fifth Street. This drug store was one of the original fixtures on the commercial district of Mill Avenue. Tempe's commercial center along Mill Avenue declined during these years.

In 1964, construction of the Grady Gammage Memorial Auditorium, designed by Frank Lloyd Wright, was completed at the intersection of Mill Avenue and Apache Boulevard on the campus of Arizona State University.

Prompted by Tempe's centennial in 1971, Mill Avenue was revitalized into an entertainment and shopping district that attracts people from throughout the Phoenix Valley.

In 1997, the Hayden Flour Mill closed after 123 years of continuous operation. The mill's last operator was Bay State Milling, which had purchased it in 1981. It is significant as the oldest continuously used industrial site in the Salt River Valley.

==== Theaters ====
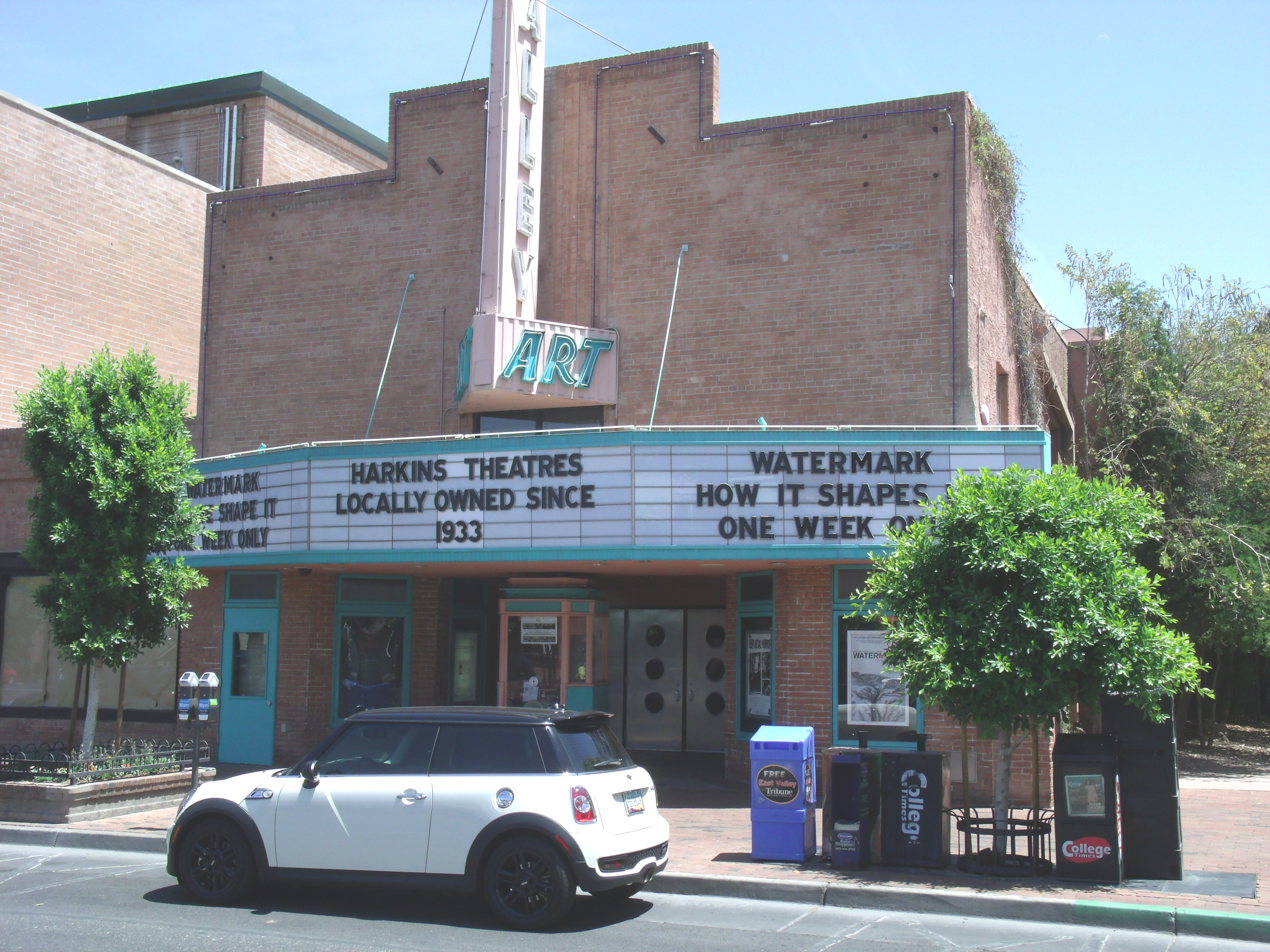
The Valley Art Theater (now the College Theatre) is located at 505-509 South Mill Ave.

The Valley Art Theater (operated by Harkins Theatres) is located on Mill Avenue as a comfortable single screen theater that typically shows art house and occasionally foreign films. The current building was built in 1938, although it underwent substantial internal renovations in the 1990s.

AMC Centerpoint, an 11-screen complex, is also located on the avenue. It was originally owned by Harkins; however, with the completion of the Tempe Marketplace, which provided a more modern building, Harkins closed it in January 2008. AMC reopened the Centerpoint in April 2014.

==== Route description ====
Mill Avenue begins its run as an arterial road at Baseline Road in Tempe, crossing U.S. Route 60, continuing in Tempe and crossing HonorHealth Tempe Medical Center, and continuing past Arizona State University. Mill Avenue continues in Downtown Tempe and ends at the eastern terminus of Van Buren Street.

Mill Avenue also appears as a neighborhood street in different parts of Tempe and Chandler.

== N ==
=== Northern Avenue ===
Northern Avenue
- Location: Peoria; Glendale; Phoenix

Northern Avenue is an east–west arterial road in the northwestern part of the Phoenix metropolitan area. The highway extends from the eastern end of Northern Parkway on the Glendale–El Mirage city line east to Arizona State Route 51 (SR 51) in Phoenix. All of Northern Avenue east of Northern Parkway is part of the National Highway System as a principal arterial.

Northern Avenue begins as an eastward continuation of Northern Parkway between Glendale to the south and El Mirage to the north. As of 2021, the transition point between the similarly named highways is Dysart Road. Northern Avenue heads east as a four-lane divided highway with a wide median that is intended to fit the eastward extension of Northern Parkway. East of El Mirage Road, the carriageways come together and cross the Agua Fria River. East of the intermittent river, Northern Avenue becomes a four-lane road with center turn lane and begins to follow the Glendale–Peoria city line. East of the New River, the highway meets SR 101 (Agua Fria Freeway) at a diamond interchange. The highway fully enters Glendale west of its intersection with U.S. Route 60 (Grand Avenue). Northern Avenue intersects 51st Avenue shortly before entering the city of Phoenix, where the avenue forms the boundary between the urban villages of North Mountain to the north and Alhambra to the south. The highway meets Interstate 17 (Arizona Veterans Highway) at a single-point urban interchange. East of Seventh Street, Northern Avenue forms the boundary between the urban villages of North Mountain and Camelback East and veers from its east–west orientation as it approaches the Phoenix Mountains. Northern Avenue reaches its eastern terminus at a diamond interchange with SR 51 (Piestewa Freeway) on the west flank of Piestewa Peak.

== O ==
=== Ocotillo Road ===
Ocotillo Road
- Location: Chandler; Gilbert; Queen Creek; San Tan Valley

Ocotillo Road is an east–west arterial road in the southeastern part of the Phoenix metropolitan area. The highway extends from Dobson Road in Chandler east through Sierra Vista Drive in San Tan Valley.

Ocotillo Road begins at Dobson Road in Chandler, where it continues east as a four-lane highway, intersecting with Arizona State Route 87 (Arizona Avenue) before leaving Chandler at Lindsay Road, where it continues in Gilbert before ending a stretch a little bit east of Greenfield Road. The highway continues at Higley Road for another two miles in Gilbert, before passing through Queen Creek at Power Road. The highway continues solely in Queen Creek for six miles, where the next mile continues on the border of Queen Creek and San Tan Valley until Gantzel Road, where it continues solely in San Tan Valley for three miles before ending its eastern terminus at Sierra Vista Drive.

=== Old West Highway ===
Old West Highway
- Location: Apache Junction

Old West Highway is a diagonal arterial road in the southeastern part of the Phoenix metropolitan area. It begins at Phelps Road / Apache Trail and continues southeast. It passes Central Arizona College - Superstition Mountain Campus. The highway ends its terminus at Goldfield Road.

== P ==
=== Pecos Road ===
Pecos Road
- Location: Chandler; Gilbert; Mesa; Queen Creek

Pecos Road is an east–west arterial road in the southeastern part of the Phoenix metropolitan area. The highway extends from Ellis Road in Chandler east through Ironwood Drive in Queen Creek.

Pecos Road begins at Ellis Road in Chandler as a two-lane highway until Dobson Road, where it continues as a six-lane highway for five miles until Gilbert Road, passing Chandler-Gilbert Community College, and continuing in Gilbert as a four-lane highway for two miles, before extending back into a six-lane highway after passing Val Vista Drive. The highway leaves Gilbert at Power Road, before crossing into Mesa, for three miles. Throughout Mesa, the highway turns slightly south before ending a stretch at Ellsworth Road, before continuing again a half mile north for another three miles, ending at Meridian Road. Another stretch starts at Ironwood Drive in Queen Creek and ends at the LG Energy Solutions

Pecos Road formerly existed as a road at the southern point of the Ahwatukee Foothills village of Phoenix before the last stretch of Arizona State Route 202 was created in 2019.

=== Power Road ===
Power Road
- Location: Chandler Heights; Queen Creek; Gilbert; Mesa

Power Road is a north–south arterial road in the southeastern part of the Phoenix metropolitan area. The highway extends from Hunt Highway at the Maricopa–Pinal county line in Chandler Heights to the north city limit of Mesa, where the road continues as Bush Highway. Power Road is part of the National Highway System as a principal arterial from Riggs Road in Chandler Heights to Thomas Road in Mesa.

Power Road heads north as a two-lane road from Hunt Highway, which follows the Maricopa–Pinal county line, through unincorporated Chandler Heights, at the north end of which the road intersects Riggs Road. North of Riggs Road, the highway mostly follows the border between the city of Queen Creek to the east and Gilbert to the west. South of Ocotillo Road, Power Road expands to a six-lane divided highway, which crosses Queen Creek south of Queen Creek Road. At Pecos Road, where a rail line passes diagonally through the intersection, the highway leaves Queen Creek and follows the border between Gilbert to the west and Mesa to the east. At Williams Field Road, the carriageways of Power Road temporarily diverge to cross the East Maricopa Floodway; Williams Field Road heads east toward Arizona State University Polytechnic campus and Phoenix–Mesa Gateway Airport.

North of the airport, Power Road has a diamond interchange with Arizona State Route 202 (SR 202; Santan Freeway) and reduces to a four-lane undivided highway with center turn lane. The highway intersects Elliot Road and expands to a six-lane divided highway again at a second crossing of the East Maricopa Floodway. Power Road fully enters Mesa at its intersection with Baseline Road. The highway passes through an S-curve and has a diamond interchange with U.S. Route 60 (Superstition Freeway). Power Road temporarily expands to eight lanes as it passes to the east of Superstition Springs Center from the freeway to Southern Avenue, then the six-lane highway passes to the east of Leisure World. North of McDowell Road, the highway has a partial interchange with SR 202 (Red Mountain Freeway) allowing access to and from the west; access to the other direction of SR 202 is provided by McDowell Road. Power Road parallels the Fannin-McFarland Aqueduct of the Central Arizona Project and reduces to four lanes for its final stretch through an intersection with Thomas Road to the north city limit of Mesa, where the road continues as Bush Highway.

=== Price Road ===
Price Road
- Location: Chandler; Tempe; Mesa

Price Road is a north–south arterial road in the southeastern part of the Phoenix metropolitan area. It begins at Dobson Road, continuing northwest, before eventually going north, passing by many businesses including Wells Fargo Co. Chandler Campus for over two miles. After intersecting the Loop 202, the highway splits into a northbound and southbound path, as the Loop 101 (Price Freeway) runs along. The highway passes the Chandler Fashion Center and continues solely in Chandler for over two and a half miles, before reaching the Chandler-Tempe borderline for two more miles, and later reaching the Tempe-Mesa borderline until slightly north of Baseline Road, where the highway continues solely in Tempe for three and a half miles, and ending at Rio Salado Parkway.

=== Priest Drive ===
Priest Drive
- Location: Tempe; Chandler; Phoenix

Priest Drive is a north–south arterial road in the southeastern part of the Phoenix metropolitan area. It begins at Ray Road at the northern terminus of 56th Street, on the Tempe-Chandler borderline. At Knox Road, the highway fully transitions into Tempe for almost three miles, before the highway briefly transitions to Guadalupe as Avenida de Yaqui for over a mile. Slightly south of Baseline Road, the highway transitions back into Priest Drive, where it passes Arizona Mills Mall, and later the U.S. Route 60. The highway later passes the Loop 202 and continues in Tempe before reaching Salt River Drive, after which the highway transitions into Phoenix, passing the Phoenix Municipal Stadium before ending at Van Buren Street, where the highway transitions into Galvin Parkway.

== Q ==
=== Queen Creek Road ===
Queen Creek Road
- Location: Gila River Indian Community; Chandler; Gilbert; Queen Creek

Queen Creek Road is an east–west arterial road in the southeastern part of the Phoenix metropolitan area. The highway extends from John Wayne Parkway, eastern terminus of Arizona State Route 347 in the Gila River Indian Community south of Phoenix east through Chandler, and Gilbert to Hawes Road in Queen Creek, before continuing from Ellsworth Road to Ironwood Drive, after it continues as Pima Road into the unincorporated community of San Tan Valley.

Queen Creek Road begins as a continuation of John Wayne Parkway as the eastern terminus of Arizona State Route 347, where it continues east–west within the Gila River Indian Community and intersects with Interstate 10. Continuing as a four-lane highway east of the I-10 for two miles, Queen Creek Road expands to six-lanes upon crossing the city Chandler shortly west of Price Road and intersects with SR 87 (Arizona Avenue). Shortly, after crossing Gilbert, the highway reduces to a four-lane road and continues to Queen Creek where it ends a stretch at Hawes Road.

Queen Creek Road is not continuous and later continues another stretch at Ellsworth Road where it continues for another four miles until Ironwood Drive, where the road continues as Pima Road.

== R ==
=== Ray Road ===
Ray Road
- Location: Phoenix; Chandler; Gilbert; Mesa; Apache Junction

Ray Road is an east–west arterial road in the southeastern part of the Phoenix metropolitan area. The highway extends from Chandler Boulevard in the Ahwatukee Foothills village of Phoenix and continues northeast through Phoenix until passing Interstate 10. The highway continues through Chandler for nine and a half miles, eventually passes through both Loop 101 and Arizona State Route 87 (Arizona Avenue). After reaching Cooper Road, the highway leaves Chandler and continues through Gilbert for seven miles. At Power Road, the highway continues through Mesa for six miles, passing by Mesa Gateway Airport and the Eastmark neighborhood. At Meridian Road, the highway continues as Ray Avenue through Apache Junction for two more miles.

=== Recker Road ===
Recker Road
- Location: Chandler Heights; Gilbert; Mesa

Recker Road is a north–south arterial road in the southeastern part of the Phoenix metropolitan area. It begins in the uncorporated Chandler Heights area at Hunt Highway, continuing for a mile before ending a stretch at Riggs Road.

Another stretch continues in Gilbert at Chandler Heights Road, continuing another stretch for two miles, ending at Queen Creek Road.

The next stretch continues at Pecos Road, passing Higley High School, and continues this stretch for six miles until reaching Baseline Road.

The last stretch continues in Mesa at Broadway Road, where it stays as an arterial road for five miles until Thomas Road, just north of the Loop 202. North of Thomas Road, Recker Road continues into a neighborhood until reaching Viewmont Drive.

=== Riggs Road ===
Riggs Road
- Location: Gila River Indian Community; Sun Lakes; Chandler; Gilbert; Queen Creek

Riggs Road is an east–west arterial road in the southeastern part of the Phoenix metropolitan area. The highway extends from Beltline Road in the Gila River Indian Community south of Phoenix east through Sun Lakes, Chandler, and Gilbert to Rittenhouse Road in Queen Creek. Riggs Road is part of the National Highway System as a principal arterial from Interstate 10 (I-10) east to Ellsworth Road in Queen Creek.

Riggs Road begins as a continuation of Beltline Road where the latter highway curves from northwest–southeast to east–west within the Gila River Indian Community. The two-lane highway heads east through open desert and has an intersection with Arizona State Route 347 (SR 347; Maricopa Road) and a diamond interchange with I-10 (Maricopa Freeway). East of I-10, Riggs Road expands to four lanes with center turn lane and leaves the open desert at the border of the native reservation and the unincorporated community of Sun Lakes at 88th Street. After passing through Sun Lakes, the highway enters the city of Chandler and intersects SR 87 (Arizona Avenue), where the east–west road expands to a six-lane divided highway. Shortly after entering Gilbert, Riggs Road crosses the East Maricopa Floodway. The highway's median becomes a center turn lane as it enters Queen Creek. Riggs Road then reduces to four lanes at its intersection with Power Road on the north side of the unincorporated village of Chandler Heights. It later passes Pecan Lake Entertainment. Beyond Ellsworth Road, the highway reduces to two lanes to its eastern terminus at Rittenhouse Road; the road continues as Combs Road and, just east of the intersection, crosses the Maricopa–Pinal county line.

=== Rittenhouse Road ===
Rittenhouse Road
- Location: Queen Creek

Rittenhouse Road is an arterial road in the southeastern part of the Phoenix metropolitan area that is known for its mostly diagonal trail. It begins at Power Road at the Gilbert-Queen Creek borderline where it continues east before going slightly south and curves east again and continuing diagonally southeast as it runs parallel to a railroad. The highway continues for a few miles through Queen Creek Marketplace and goes south just before intersecting Ocotillo Road, and continues southeast after the intersection. The highway passes Schnepf Farms at the intersection of Riggs Road / Combs Road, the highway ends its southern terminus and transitions into Gary Road.

=== Rural Road ===
Rural Road
- Location: Chandler; Tempe

Rural Road is a north–south arterial road in the southeastern part of the Phoenix metropolitan area. The highway extends from Chandler Boulevard in Chandler north to Rio Salado Parkway in Tempe, where the highway continues north as Scottsdale Road. Rural Road is part of the National Highway System as a principal arterial from Elliot Road north to Rio Salado Parkway within Tempe.

Rural Road begins as a four-lane divided highway at Chandler Boulevard in Chandler. At Ray Road, the highway enters Tempe passing Corona del Sol High School and gains a third southbound lane and a center turn lane. Rural Road gains a third northbound lane at Warner Road and drops back to four lanes at the Western Canal. The highway expands to a six-lane divided highway at Baseline Road, passes through an S-curve, and meets U.S. Route 60 (Superstition Freeway) at a diamond interchange. North of the freeway, the highway's median becomes a center turn lane. North of Apache Boulevard, Rural Road passes through the Tempe campus of Arizona State University. Within the campus, the highway intersects the Valley Metro Rail light rail line and becomes a divided highway again. Rural Road ends and Scottsdale Road begins at Rio Salado Boulevard at the north end of the university campus.

== S ==
=== Scottsdale Road ===
Scottsdale Road
- Location: Tempe; Scottsdale

Scottsdale Road is a north–south arterial road in the northeastern part of the Phoenix metropolitan area. The highway extends from Rio Salado Parkway in Tempe, where the highway continues south as Rural Road, north to Carefree Highway in northern Scottsdale. The full length of Scottsdale Road is part of the National Highway System as a principal arterial.

Scottsdale Road begins and Rural Road ends at Rio Salado Parkway at the north end of the Tempe campus of Arizona State University. Scottsdale Road heads north as a six-lane divided highway that immediately crosses over the Salt River. North of the river, the highway has a single-point urban interchange with Arizona State Route 202 (SR 202; Red Mountain Freeway). Scottsdale Road leaves Tempe and enters Scottsdale at McKellips Road. Through downtown Scottsdale, two parallel roads split from and rejoin Scottsdale Road—Drinkwater Boulevard to the east and Goldwater Boulevard to the west—and Scottsdale Road carries four lanes through downtown, where the highway intersects Indian School Road. North of downtown Scottsdale, the highway passes along the east side of the town of Paradise Valley and passes through Central Scottsdale, where the road intersects Shea Boulevard. North of Cactus Road, Scottsdale Road forms the border between the Paradise Valley urban village of Phoenix to the west and Scottsdale to the east. The highway passes to the west of Scottsdale Airport between Thunderbird Road and the intersection with the east end of Bell Road and the west end of Frank Lloyd Wright Boulevard. Immediately north of the intersection, Scottsdale Road crosses the Central Arizona Project aqueduct and borders the Desert View urban village of Phoenix on the west. At its diamond interchange with SR 101 (Pima Freeway), the highway becomes a four-lane highway with center turn lane through a mix of open desert and subdivisions. Scottsdale Road fully enters the city of Scottsdale and becomes a divided highway shortly before its northern terminus at a three-legged intersection with Carefree Highway. The road continues north into Carefree as Tom Darlington Drive.

The Borgata of Scottsdale was an open-air shopping center at 6166 North Scottsdale Road in Scottsdale. Built in 1981, the approximately 90,000-square-foot development was designed with architectural elements inspired by the Tuscan town of San Gimignano. By 2013, most of its stores had vacated the property as plans advanced to redevelop the site for residential use. The shopping center was demolished later that year and replaced by a condominium development known as The Enclave at Borgata.

=== Shea Boulevard ===
Shea Boulevard
- Location: Phoenix; Scottsdale; Fountain Hills
- Length: 19.54 mi (31.45 km)

Shea Boulevard is an east–west arterial road in the northeastern part of the Phoenix metropolitan area. The highway extends 19.54 miles (31.45 km) from 21st Place in Phoenix east through Scottsdale to Arizona State Route 87 (SR 87) just east of Fountain Hills. Shea Boulevard is part of the National Highway System as a principal arterial from SR 51 east to SR 87 (Beeline Highway).

Shea Boulevard begins at its curve onto 21st Place on the east flank of Stoney Mountain, part of the Phoenix Mountains in the Paradise Valley urban village of the city of Phoenix. The highway heads east as a two-lane suburban road that expands to a four-lane highway with center turn lane east of 24th Street. Shea Boulevard passes Shadow Mountain High School and has a single-point urban interchange with SR 51 (Piestewa Freeway). The highway expands to a six-lane divided highway east of 40th Street. Between its intersection with Tatum Boulevard in the commercial center of Paradise Valley and a stream to the east, Shea Boulevard runs along the northern edge of the town of Paradise Valley. The highway enters the city of Scottsdale and passes along the east–west part of the city known as Central Scottsdale or the Shea Corridor. Shea Boulevard intersects Scottsdale Road in another commercial area and has a single-point urban interchange with SR 101 (Pima Freeway). East of Frank Lloyd Wright Boulevard, which heads north to Taliesin West, the highway crosses the Central Arizona Project aqueduct. East of the Scottsdale campus of Mayo Clinic Arizona, Shea Boulevard veers from its straight east–west course and passes through the southern end of the McDowell Mountains into the town of Fountain Hills, where the road reduces to four lanes at Fountain Hills Boulevard. The highway curves southeast and exits the town into the Salt River Pima–Maricopa Indian Community before reaching its eastern terminus at AZ 87 (Beeline Highway).

=== Signal Butte Road ===
Signal Butte Road
- Location: Queen Creek; Mesa

Signal Butte Road is a north–south arterial road in the southeastern part of the Phoenix metropolitan area. It begins at Empire Boulevard in Queen Creek, where it goes north for a mile until Riggs Road, where it ends a stretch.

Signal Butte Road begins another stretch at Camina Buena Vista, which is slightly south of Ocotillo Road, the highway continues north and passes Frontier Family Park. After crossing Germann Road, the highway enters Mesa, where it stays for its entire run. The highway crosses the Arizona State Route 24, and later continues in the neighborhood of Eastmark, and a few miles north crosses the U.S. 60, and later ends slightly north of Brown Road.

=== Sossaman Road ===
Sossaman Road
- Location: Chandler Heights; Queen Creek; Mesa

Sossaman Road is a north–south arterial road in the southeastern part of the Phoenix metropolitan area. It begins in the uncorporated Chandler Heights, at Skyline Drive. The road continues in Chandler Heights for two miles, until reaching Riggs Road, where it transitions into Queen Creek. The highway passes Newell Barney Junior High School, the highway continues in Queen Creek for four miles, until passing Germann Road, when the highway transitions into Mesa. The highway passes the Mesa Gateway Airport, and the Arizona State University Polytechnic campus. The highway ends this stretch at Ray Road.

Another stretch continues at Warner Road, passing both the Santos Soccer Complex and Paloma Sports Complex. The highway later passes the U.S. Route 60, later ending at University Drive.

Another stretch continues at McKellips Road and ends a mile later at McDowell Road.

=== Southern Avenue ===
Southern Road
- Location: Buckeye; Avondale; Phoenix; Tempe; Mesa; Apache Junction

Southern Avenue is an east–west arterial road in the Phoenix metropolitan area. The highway extends from 315th Avenue in Buckeye as a two-lane highway, the highway continues in Buckeye for twelve miles, eventually intersecting Arizona State Route 85, and ends a stretch at Dean Road.

The highway continues another stretch at Jackrabbit Trail still in Buckeye for another two miles until reaching MC 85, ending that stretch.

The highway begins another stretch at Dysart Road in Avondale for four miles until reaching 99th Avenue.

Another stretch continues at 75th Avenue in the Laveen urban village of Phoenix for six miles, eventually crossing the Arizona State Route 202, until reaching 27th Avenue, where it crosses into the South Mountain urban village of Phoenix, for eight miles. After intersecting 48th Street, the highway leaves Phoenix and enters Tempe and crosses the Interstate 10, and continuing in Tempe for five miles, including crossing Loop 101. The highway leaves Tempe and continues into Mesa after crossing the Tempe Canal Trail. The highway continues in Mesa for seventeen miles, and passes by the Superstition Springs Mall. The highway leaves both Mesa and Maricopa County after crossing Meridian Road, and entering Apache Junction and Pinal County. The highway continues for four miles until ending its eastern terminus at Starr Road.

=== Stapley Road ===
Stapley Road
- Location: Mesa; Salt River Pima–Maricopa Indian Community

Stapley Road is a north–south arterial road in the southeastern part of the Phoenix metropolitan area. The highway starts at Baseline Road, at the northern terminus of Cooper Road. The highway continues north passing the U.S. Route 60, for five miles, before reaching McKellips Road, and transitions into a neighborhood. Another stretch continues at Lehi Road, staying in Mesa for a half mile. At McDowell Road, the road transitions into the Salt River Pima–Maricopa Indian Community for another mile, ending at Thomas Road.

=== Sun Valley Parkway ===
Sun Valley Parkway
- Location: Buckeye; Surprise

Sun Valley Parkway is mainly located in Buckeye, with a small portion extending into Surprise, Arizona.

Built in the 1980s, the four-lane divided parkway traverses approximately 30 miles of what was once open desert about 35 miles west of downtown Phoenix. It extends north–south from Interstate 10 at exit 109 (Sun Valley Parkway / Palo Verde Road) in Buckeye, turns after about 12 miles or so to become an east–west road, and leads eastward to Surprise, where the road connects to and becomes Bell Road through Surprise and other West Valley suburbs (and eventually the City of Phoenix itself).

=== Superstition Boulevard ===
Superstition Boulevard
- Location: Apache Junction

Superstition Boulevard is an east–west arterial road in the southeastern part of the Phoenix metropolitan area. It starts at Meridian Road, at the eastern terminus of University Drive. The highway continues in Apache Junction for over five miles.

== T ==
=== Tomahawk Road ===
Tomahawk Road
- Location: Apache Junction

Tomahawk Road is a north–south arterial road in the southeastern part of the Phoenix metropolitan area. It begins slightly south of Baseline Avenue in Apache Junction, and passes the U.S. Route 60. The highway continues for four miles, ending at Lost Dutchman Boulevard.

== U ==
=== University Drive ===
University Drive
- Location: Phoenix; Tempe; Mesa

University Drive is an east–west arterial road in the southeastern part of the Phoenix metropolitan area. It begins at the Interstate 10 in Phoenix at the northern terminus of 32nd Street. The road continues going northeast until 38th Street when it goes fully east. The road continues in Phoenix until crossing the Arizona State Route 143, where it crosses into Tempe, the road continues east, passing by Arizona State University and Downtown Tempe. It later passes the Loop 101, and after intersecting Evergreen Road, the highway enters Mesa, where it stays for seventeen and a half miles. On the route, the highway passes many landmarks, including Mesa Convention Center, and eventually crosses Loop 202. At Meridian Road, the highway changes into Superstition Boulevard in Apache Junction.

== V ==
=== Val Vista Drive ===
Val Vista Drive
- Location: Chandler; Gilbert; Mesa

Val Vista Drive is a north–south arterial road in the southeastern part of the Phoenix metropolitan area. It begins at Hunt Highway on the Chandler-Gilbert borderline and passes Basha High School. At Chandler Heights Road, the highway fully transitions into Gilbert, where the highway continues for ten miles. En route, the highway crosses the Loop 202. At Baseline Road, the highway transitions into Mesa, where it shortly passes the U.S. Route 60. The highway stays in Mesa for over seven miles, ending its run at the Loop 202, just north of Thomas Road.

=== Van Buren Street ===
Van Buren Street
- Location: Buckeye; Goodyear; Avondale; Phoenix

Van Buren Street is a central east–west arterial road in the Phoenix metropolitan area. Beginning in the outskirts of town at 379th Avenue, continuing for five miles until reaching Hassayampa Road. The next stretch continues in Buckeye at 299th Avenue, continuing a stretch for a mile until Sun Valley Parkway.

Its longest stretch continues at Jackrabbit Trail, continuing in Buckeye for another mile, before transitioning into Goodyear at 187th Avenue, and passing the Loop 303, the highway continues solely in Goodyear for over six miles. At 137th Avenue, the highway continues on the Goodyear-Avondale borderline for almost a mile until Dysart Road. The highway continues solely in Avondale for three miles until it reaches the Avondale-Tolleson borderline at 107th Avenue. At 99th Avenue, the highway continues solely in Tolleson for two miles, before reaching the Tolleson-Phoenix borderline at 83rd Avenue, leaving Tolleson completely at 75th Avenue, where transitions solely in Phoenix for the remainder of its run. The highway crosses the Target Distribution Center, the Arizona State Route 202, and the Interstate 17, before transitions in Downtown Phoenix. In Downtown, many landmarks are passed including The Van Buren, the United States Court House, Arizona Center, and both Arizona State University Downtown campus and University of Arizona College of Medicine campus. The highway continues east, passing the Interstate 10, the Arizona State Route 143, and the Loop 202. At its eastern terminus of Mill Avenue, the highway passes both the Phoenix Zoo and Phoenix Municipal Stadium.

== W ==
=== Warner Road ===
Warner Road
- Location: Phoenix; Tempe; Chandler; Gilbert; Mesa

Warner Road is an east–west arterial road in the southeastern part of the Phoenix metropolitan area. The highway extends from the Warner Elliot Loop in the Ahwatukee Foothills village of Phoenix and continues southeast through Phoenix until passing Interstate 10. The highway continues through Tempe for four and a half miles and after passing Loop 101, it continues through Chandler for five miles, eventually passes through Arizona State Route 87 (Arizona Avenue). After reaching McQueen Road, the highway leaves Chandler and continues through Gilbert for another eight miles. At Power Road, the highway continues through Mesa and ends a stretch at a dead end, before continuing again at Sossaman Road, where the continues east before ending a stretch at Eastmark Parkway. At Signal Butte Road, the highway continues again for another mile until ending at Meridian Road.

=== Williams Field Road ===
Williams Field Road
- Location: Gilbert; Mesa

Williams Field Road is an east–west arterial road in the southeastern part of the Phoenix metropolitan area. The highway extends from Gilbert Road at the eastern terminus of Chandler Boulevard, at the Chandler-Gilbert borderline, including passing SanTan Village before reaching Loop 202. At Power Road, the highway leaves Gilbert and briefly continues into Mesa and continues until Innovation Way at the Arizona State University Polytechnic Campus. The highway continues another stretch at Ellsworth Road, where it passes Bell Bank Park and Arizona State Route 24, it continues east for three miles until reaching Meridian Road.

== Y ==
=== Yuma Road ===
Yuma Road
- Location: Buckeye; Goodyear

Yuma Road is an east–west arterial road in the midwestern part of the Phoenix metropolitan area. It begins at Johnson Road in Buckeye for over two miles before ending a stretch. The next stretch begins at Durango Street and continues in Buckeye for seven and a half miles. At Perryville Road, the highway transitions into Goodyear, where it stays for the next six miles before its eastern terminus ends at Litchfield Road, where it continues as Western Avenue in Avondale for another mile and a half.

== See also ==
- Mill Avenue Bridges
- Tempe Town Lake
