= Bush highway =

Bush highway may refer to:

- Bush Highway (Arizona)
- President George Bush Turnpike
