= Phoenician Resort =

Hotel in Scottsdale, Arizona, USA

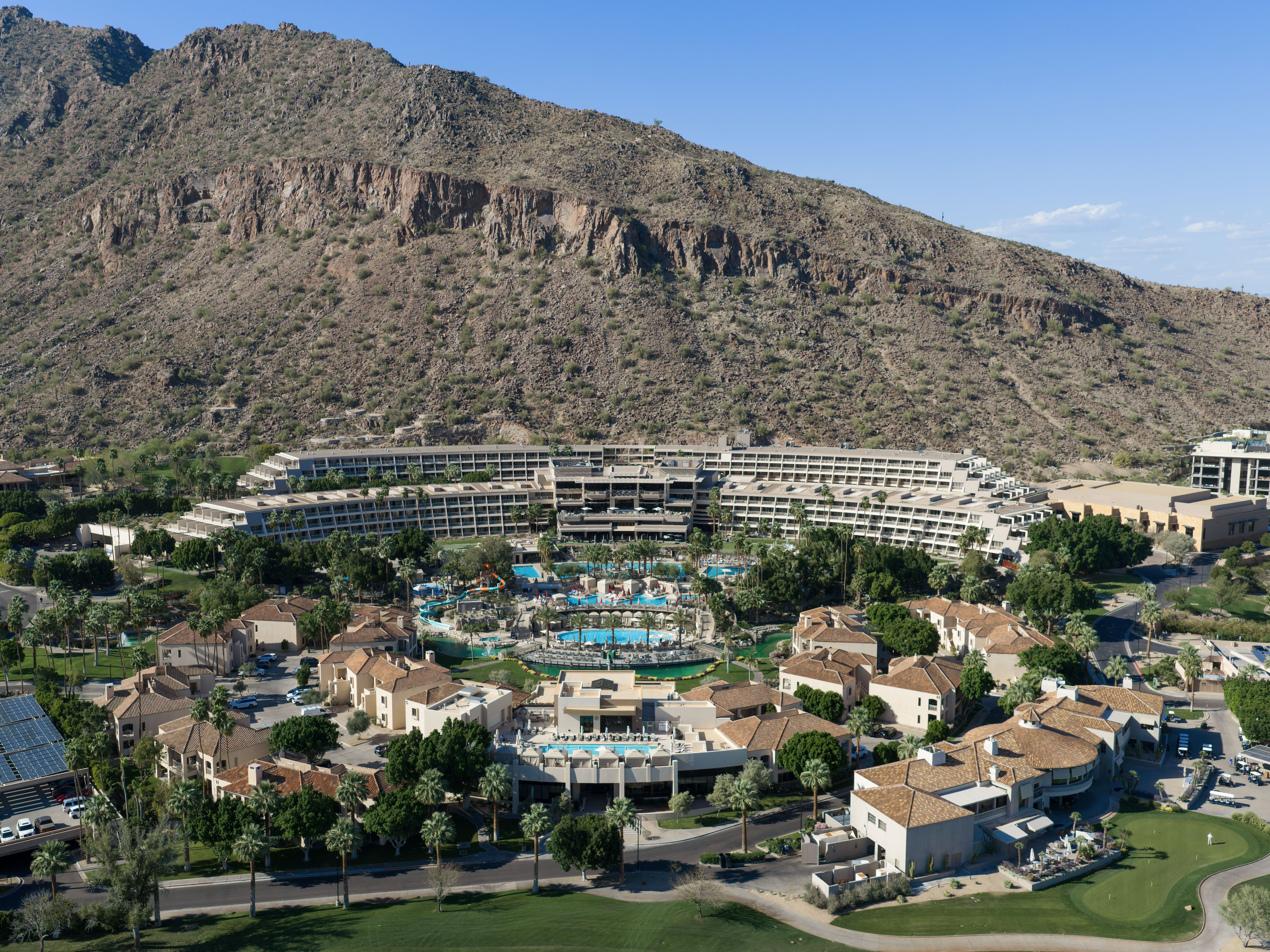
- The resort in 2026

- Location within Arizona

General information
- Location: 6000 E. Camelback Road, Scottsdale, Arizona
- Coordinates: 33°30′26″N 111°56′59″W
- Opening: October 1, 1988
- Operator: The Luxury Collection

Design and construction
- Architects: Killingsworth, Stricker, Lindgren, Wilson and Associates

Other information
- Number of rooms: 643
- Number of restaurants: 9

Website
- http://www.thephoenician.com/

The Phoenician Resort is a luxury resort in Scottsdale. Built on the grounds of the historic Jokake Inn, the resort opened in 1988, a project of financier Charles Keating. The resort has been awarded a AAA Five-Diamond rating.

== History ==
In 1985 Charles Keating purchased the property at the base of Camelback Mountain, which included the land occupied by the historic Jokake Inn and Elizabeth Arden's Maine Chance Spa. In addition, three other valley facilities also sat on the acreage Keating purchased: the Paradise Inn, the Valley Country Club, and the El Estribo Lodge. As architects, Keating hired the firm of Killingsworth, Stricker, Lindgren, Wilson and Associates, located in Long Beach, California. The spa, the Centre for Well Being, was designed by JGL Associates, out of Vermont. He intended to build a world class resort, envisioning it as "the eighth wonder of the world". For the construction of the lobby, white marble was imported from Carrera, Italy. Landscape craftsmen from Tonga were brought to Scottsdale to create the tropical landscape surrounding the hotel. The Phoenician was built at a cost of over $300 million. The resort opened for business on October 1, 1988, The hotel initially had 604 rooms, 132 casitas, a VIP suite and a presidential suite. The dome in the hotel's lobby was covered with 24 karat gold, and the cactus garden, which contained over 250 varieties of cacti, was the second largest in the state when it was completed. In addition, the hotel had 9 Steinway grand pianos, which was the largest order in the company's history. Keating's ownership of the resort was short-lived, however, as it was seized when he was indicted in 1989 for his role in the savings and loan crisis. After its seizure, the government briefly ran the resort, during which time it became known colloquially as "Club Fed". The government sold it shortly after to the Kuwaiti Investment Office. The Kuwaitis had owned 45% of the hotel prior to its seizure by the federal government, and they paid $111.5 million for the remaining 55%.

The Kuwaitis sold it to ITT Sheraton in 1994, which was absorbed by Starwood in 1998. In 2010, a new ballroom was added to the property, at a cost of $40 million. Between 2010 and 2012, $80 million in renovations were done to the property, which included the creation of a "resort within a resort", the Canyon Suites. This unusual feature includes 60 rooms, including 38 suites, and 2 presidential suites. The resort also includes a $25 million art collection. In 2015, the property was purchased from Starwood by Host Hotels & Resorts. As of February 2016, the resort contains 643 rooms (including 62 suites), and sits on 250 acres, with eleven restaurants, nine swimming pools, eleven tennis courts (and the only resort in Arizona with four different playing surfaces), and a 27-hole golf course designed by Ted Robinson and Homer Flint. The golf course is rated as a USGA championship course, which consists of three 9-hole courses, each with its own unique character. In the 2000s, the hotel installed a solar array, which helps to supply the energy needs of the property.

== Awards and accolades ==
In 1994 the hotel was awarded the first of its five-star ratings by the Mobil Travel Guide (now Forbes Travel Guide). Since that award, the hotel has received either a five- or four-star award every year through 2015 (the current award).
