= Bell Road (Phoenix Metro) =

Arterial road in the northern Phoenix, Arizona metropolitan area

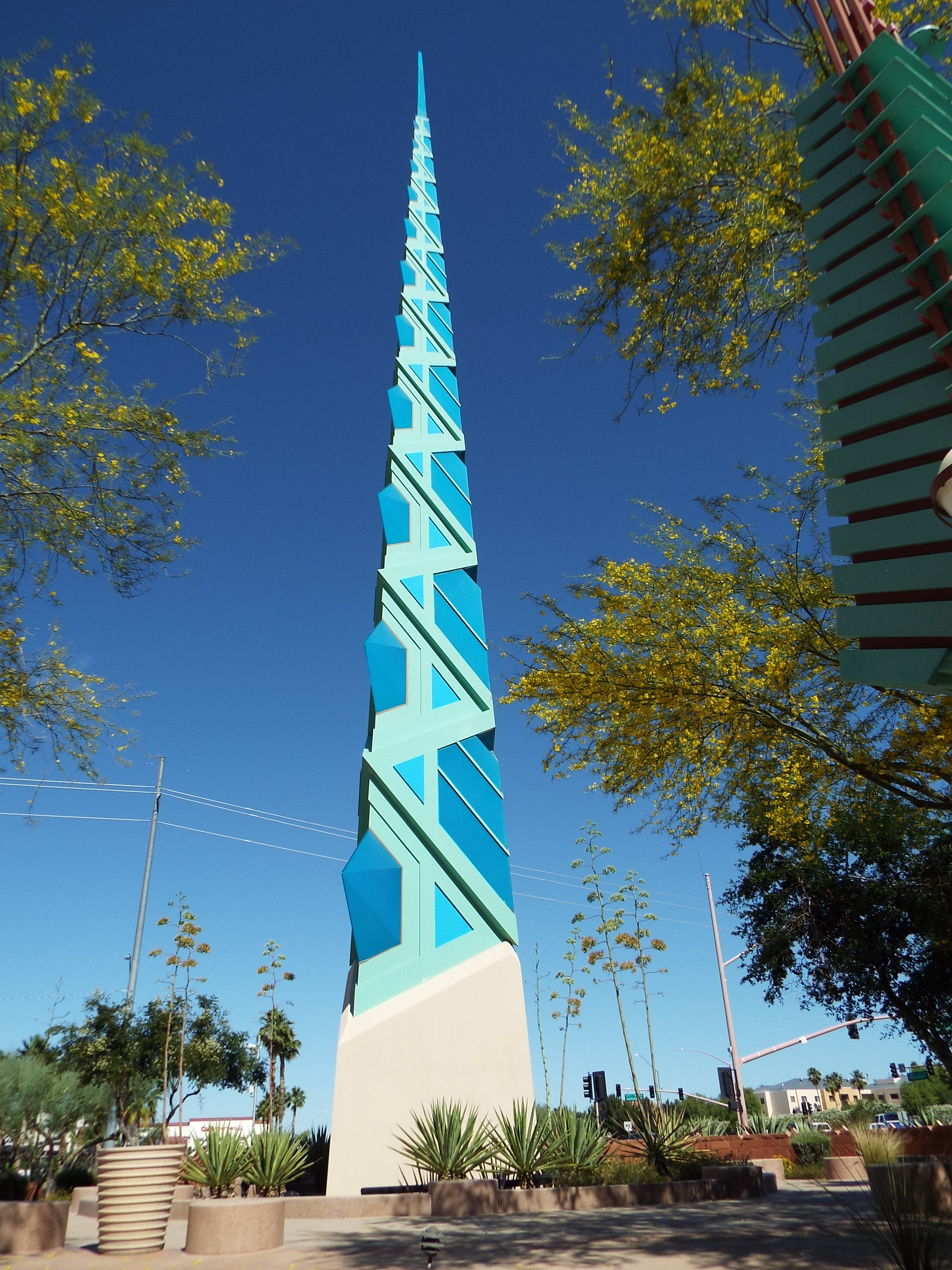
- The Scottsdale Spire, located in the southeast corner of Bell and Scottsdale Roads in Scottsdale, Arizona, designed by Frank Lloyd Wright.
- Namesake: Harvey Bell
- Type: Arterial street
- Owner: Maricopa County and the cities of Surprise, Peoria, Glendale, Phoenix, and Scottsdale
- Length: 34.6 mi (55.7 km); 1.4 mi (2.25 km) gap in Scottsdale
- Location: Maricopa County, Arizona, United States
- West end: Sun Valley Parkway in Surprise
- Major junctions: Loop 303 in Surprise; US 60 in Surprise; Loop 101 at the Peoria–Glendale line I-17 in Phoenix; SR 51 in Phoenix; Scottsdale Road / Frank Lloyd Wright Boulevard in Phoenix Hayden Road in Scottsdale; Loop 101 Surprise
- East end: McDowell Mountain Ranch Road in Scottsdale
- North: Union Hills Drive (18600 North)
- South: Greenway Road (15400 North)

Construction
- Completion: mid-1970s (present alignment)

Bell Road is a major east-west arterial road in the northern Phoenix, Arizona, metropolitan area. It is one of the few roadways to cross the Agua Fria River in the northwestern part of the metro area, providing a vital link between the growing suburb of Surprise with Phoenix. As a result, the portion of Bell Road passing through Surprise and Sun City is the busiest arterial road in the state of Arizona.

The road is named for farmer Harvey Bell, who, together with James Shea, formed in 1916 the Paradise Verde Irrigation District.

== Route description ==
The street lies at the 17000 North alignment of the Maricopa County grid system. At its eastern terminus, the main segment of Bell Road, approximately 31 miles (50 km) in length, begins at the corporate boundaries of Phoenix and Scottsdale at its intersection with Scottsdale Road. Traveling west, the road intersects State Route 51 and Interstate 17 in Phoenix, the Loop 101 (Agua Fria Freeway) in Peoria, and Grand Avenue and Loop 303 in Surprise. West of the Beardsley Canal, the roadway curves around the White Tank Mountain Regional Park, becoming the Sun Valley Parkway.

East of 66th Street, Bell Road takes a southeasterly bend and, at its intersection with Scottsdale Road, becomes Frank Lloyd Wright Boulevard, named in recognition of the architect and designer. This alignment was built in the mid-1970s during the construction of the CAP canal, which Frank Lloyd Wright Boulevard parallels. In this area of Scottsdale, a non-contiguous segment of Bell Road approximately 3.7 miles (6.0 km) long exists north of Frank Lloyd Wright Boulevard, including an intersection with the Pima Freeway (Loop 101).

East of the McDowell Mountains, the Bell Road alignment forms the northern boundary of the city of Fountain Hills.

Prominent locations on or near Bell Road include Scottsdale Airport, Turf Paradise Race Course, Arrowhead Towne Center and the Peoria Sports Complex. Bell Road also forms the northern boundary of the original town site of Surprise.

== Major intersections ==
The entire road is in Maricopa County.

Location	mi	km	Destinations	Notes
Surprise	0.00	0.00	Sun Valley Parkway west	Continuation beyond western end
Surprise	0.00	0.00	McMicken Dam; western end of Bell Rd.	
Surprise	2.50	4.02	Loop 303 (Bob Stump Memorial Parkway)	SPUI; exit 116 on Loop 303
Surprise	6.40	10.30	US 60 (Grand Avenue)	Interchange
Peoria–Glendale line	12.90	20.76	Loop 101 (Agua Fria Freeway)	SPUI; exit 14 on Loop 101
Phoenix	19.90	32.03	I-17 (Black Canyon Freeway) – Tucson, Flagstaff	Diamond interchange with service roads; exit 212 on I-17
Phoenix	26.40	42.49	SR 51	SPUI; exit 13 on SR 51
Phoenix	30.90	49.73	Scottsdale Road / Frank Lloyd Wright Boulevard east	Road name transitions to Frank Lloyd Wright Boulevard
Gap in route; connection made via 1.4 miles (2.25 km) of Frank Lloyd Wright Boulevard and Greenway–Hayden Loop
Scottsdale	0.00	0.00	Hayden Road north / Greenway-Hayden Loop south	
Scottsdale	1.00	1.61	Loop 101 (Pima Freeway)	Exit 38 on Loop 101; indirect northbound access via service roads
Scottsdale	3.70	5.95	McDowell Mountain Ranch Road south	Continuation beyond eastern end
1.000 mi = 1.609 km; 1.000 km = 0.621 mi: Incomplete access; Route transition
