= Citrus Park, Arizona =

CDP in Maricopa County, Arizona

- Census-designated place
- Location in Maricopa County, Arizona

- Location within Arizona Location within the United States
- Coordinates: 33°31′58″N 112°26′45″W
- Country: United States
- State: Arizona
- County: Maricopa

Area
  - Total: 4.955 sq mi (12.834 km^{2})
  - Land: 4.953 sq mi (12.828 km^{2})
  - Water: 0.0019 sq mi (0.005 km^{2})
- Elevation: 1,152 ft (351 m)

Population (2020)
  - Total: 5,194
  - Density: 895.6/sq mi (345.81/km^{2})
- Time zone: UTC-7 (MST (no DST))
- FIPS code: 04-13820
- GNIS feature ID: 2582757

Citrus Park is an unincorporated area and census-designated place (CDP) in Maricopa County, Arizona, United States. The population was 5,194 at the time of the 2020 census, an increase of 28.9% over the population of 4,028 in 2010.

Citrus Park is served by the Waddell, Arizona post office. Citrus Park neighborhoods are served by irrigation water.

== Geography ==
Citrus Park is on the western side of the Phoenix metropolitan area. It is bordered to the south by Goodyear and to the east by Glendale. Perryville Road, which forms the western boundary of Citrus Park, is technically within the Glendale city limits, indicating a potential westward extension of Glendale into Citrus Park in the future. Northern Avenue is the northern boundary of Citrus Park. The community is 25 miles (40 km) west-northwest of downtown Phoenix.

== Demographics ==
Historical population
| Census | Pop. | Note | %± |
|---|---|---|---|
| 2010 | 4,028 | | — |
| 2020 | 5,194 | | 28.9% |
Census Data Tables

=== 2020 census ===
As of the 2020 census, Citrus Park had a population of 5,194. The median age was 45.3 years. 24.3% of residents were under the age of 18 and 17.3% of residents were 65 years of age or older. For every 100 females there were 94.2 males, and for every 100 females age 18 and over there were 94.0 males age 18 and over.

98.7% of residents lived in urban areas, while 1.3% lived in rural areas.

There were 1,616 households in Citrus Park, of which 36.3% had children under the age of 18 living in them. Of all households, 78.1% were married-couple households, 7.6% were households with a male householder and no spouse or partner present, and 9.9% were households with a female householder and no spouse or partner present. About 9.0% of all households were made up of individuals and 4.1% had someone living alone who was 65 years of age or older.

There were 1,680 housing units, of which 3.8% were vacant. The homeowner vacancy rate was 0.5% and the rental vacancy rate was 6.8%.

Population by race and ethnicity
| Race and ethnicity | Population | % of total population |
|---|---|---|
| American Indian and Alaska Native | 42 | 0.809% |
| Asian | 93 | 1.791% |
| Black or African American | 122 | 2.349% |
| Hispanic or Latino of any race | 1,006 | 19.369% |
| Native Hawaiian and Pacific Islander | 2 | 0.039% |
| Not Hispanic or Latino | 3,713 | 71.486% |
| Some other race | 330 | 6.353% |
| Two or more races | 611 | 11.764% |
| White | 3,994 | 76.896% |

=== American Community Survey data ===
Information from American Community Survey 2016-2020 five-year estimates:

Quick information
| Statistic | Value |
|---|---|
| Land area | 4.953 sq mi |
| Median household income | $108,750 |
| Bachelor's degree or higher | 28.0% |
| Employment rate | 56.6% |
| Without health care coverage | 6.5% |

Population by age range
| Age range | % of total population |
|---|---|
| Under 5 years | 3.9% |
| 18 years and over | 77.0% |

== Education ==
It is in the Litchfield Elementary School District and the Agua Fria Union High School District.
