= Chandler Heights, Arizona =

Unincorporated community in the state of Arizona, United States

- Unincorporated community
- Location within Arizona Location within the United States
- Coordinates: 33°12′43″N 111°41′10″W
- Country: United States
- State: Arizona
- Counties: Maricopa
- Elevation: 1,421 ft (433 m)
- Time zone: UTC-7 (Mountain (MST))
- ZIP code: 85227
- Area code: 480
- GNIS feature ID: 2749

Chandler Heights was a census-designated place and unincorporated community in Maricopa County, Arizona, United States. It is 11 miles southeast of Chandler. Formerly, Chandler Heights had a ZIP code of 85227, but it has since been abolished, and the United States Postal Service now uses "Queen Creek" for all Chandler Heights addresses.

Much of Chandler Heights is located within the planning boundaries of the town of Queen Creek for future annexation, with a small portion (west of Recker Rd) extending into the planning boundaries of the town of Gilbert.

== History ==
The population of Chandler Heights was 75 in the 1960 census.
