= Bush Highway (Arizona) =

Scenic highway in Arizona

- Harvey Bush Highway
- Bush Highway highlighted in red

Route information
- Maintained by MCDOT and the City of Mesa
- Length: 15.2 mi (24.5 km) 20.6 mi (33.15 km) as Power Road
- Existed: 1934–present

Major junctions
- South end: Power Road in Mesa
- North end: SR 87 in Tonto National Forest

Location
- Country: United States
- State: Arizona
- Counties: Maricopa

Highway system
- Scenic Byways; National; National Forest; BLM; NPS; Arizona State Highway System; Interstate; US; State; Scenic Proposed; Former

Bush Highway is a scenic highway in the US state of Arizona. It begins at the northern end of Power Road in Mesa and extends northeasterly through the Tonto National Forest to the Beeline Highway. The highway was named for local resident Harvey Grandville Bush in the 1930s.

The road continues south beyond its terminus as Power Road, a major road within the cities of Mesa, Gilbert, and Queen Creek.

== Route description ==
Bush Highway begins at the northern end of Power Road at the northern boundary of Mesa and continues northward. Near the Salt River, the roadway turns to the northeast into Tonto National Forest. The highway runs over the Arizona Canal and past the Granite Reef Dam. The highway continues along the Salt River near its confluence with the Verde River and past Red Mountain. It crosses the river on the Blue Point Bridge, which is a location used traditionally as the start of tubing trips down the river. From there, the road continues northerly past the Stewart Mountain Dam and Saguaro Lake to connect with State Route 87 (Beeline Highway).

== History ==
The highway was named after Harvey Granville Bush, a Mesa lumberman. Construction on what was then called "The Harvey Bush Highway" began on March 21, 1933. The road opened to the public in 1934.

== Major intersections ==
The entire route is in Tonto National Forest, Maricopa County.

mi	km	Destinations	Notes
0.0	0.0	Power Road south	Continuation beyond southern terminus
7.7	12.4	Bridge over the Salt River	
11.2	18.0	FFH 206 (Saguaro Lake Road) – Saguaro del Norte	
15.1	24.3	SR 87 – Phoenix, Payson	Diamond interchange; northern terminus; exit 199 on SR 87
1.000 mi = 1.609 km; 1.000 km = 0.621 mi: Route transition
