= Camp Creek, Arizona =

- Populated place
- Location within Arizona Location within the United States
- Coordinates: 33°54′42″N 111°49′01″W
- Country: United States
- State: Arizona
- County: Maricopa
- Elevation: 3,392 ft (1,034 m)
- Time zone: UTC-7 (Mountain (MST))
  - Summer (DST): UTC-7 (MST)
- ZIP codes: 85331
- Area code: 623
- FIPS code: 04-09410
- GNIS feature ID: 27200

Camp Creek is a populated place situated in Maricopa County, Arizona, United States. It has an estimated elevation of 3,392 feet (1,034 m) above sea level. It is located in the Tonto National Forest.
