= Riverview High School (Arizona) =

Coordinates: 33.446902°N 111.839625°W

Location
- 1501 W Guadalupe Road; Mesa, Arizona 85202; United States

Information
- School type: Public alternative high school
- Principal: Vice Principal Adam Malik
- Grades: 7-12
- Enrollment: 20-50
- Colors: green, black, white
- Mascot: Chameleon
- Website: https://riverview.mpsaz.org

Riverview High School is one of two alternative high schools operated by Mesa Public Schools. It was formerly known as Mesa Vista High School.
