= Open air =

Open air, open-air or openair may refer to:

- Open Air, a BBC television programme
- Open-air cinema or outdoor cinema
- Open Air (climb), a sport climbing rock route in Austria
- Open-air concert, a concert taking place outside
- Open-air museum, a distinct type of museum exhibiting its collections out-of-doors
- Open-air preaching, the act of publicly proclaiming a religious message
- Open-air treatment, therapeutic exposure to fresh air and sunshine
- Open air school, an outdoor school designed to combat the spread of disease
- OpenAIR, a message routing and communication protocol for artificial intelligence systems
- Openair Cinemas, an Australasian brand of outdoor cinema events, owned by Pedestrian (company)

== See also ==
- Open Air Suit, a studio album by Air
- Open Air PM, a defunct daily newspaper in New York City
- OpenAIRE, a network of Open Access repositories, archives and journals
