= Pegasus Airpark =

Airport in Maricopa County, Arizona

Pegasus Airpark AZ
- IATA: none; ICAO: none; FAA LID: 5AZ3

Summary
- Airport type: Private
- Owner: Pegasus Airpark Flight Association
- Serves: Pegasus Airpark AZ
- Location: Queen Creek, Arizona
- Elevation AMSL: 1,450 ft / 442 m
- Coordinates: 33°12′45″N 111°37′03″W
- Website: pegasusairparkaz.com

Map

Runways
Direction	Length		Surface
Direction	ft	m	Surface
8/26	5,000	1,524	Asphalt

Pegasus Airpark (FAA LID: 5AZ3) is a private-use airport owned by the Pegasus Airpark Flight Association, located 4 miles (3.5 nmi; 6.4 km) south of the central business district of Queen Creek, in Maricopa County, Arizona, United States. The airport is part of a gated community built around the runway.

== Facilities ==
The airport has one asphalt runway:

- 8/26 measuring 5,000 ft × 80 ft (1,524 m × 24 m)

== See also ==
- List of airports in Arizona
