= New Waddell Dam =

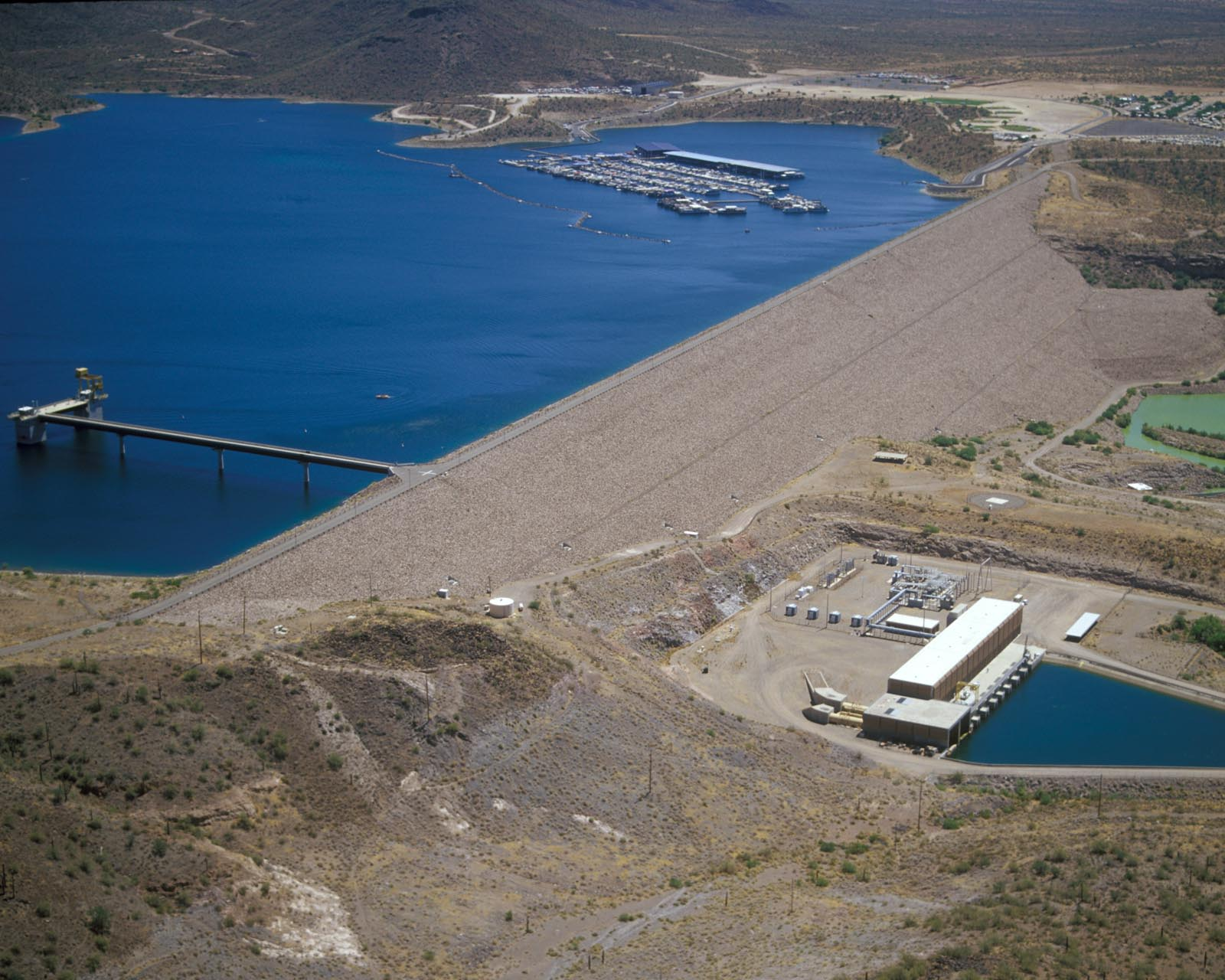

- Location within Arizona Location within the United States
- Country: United States
- Location: Maricopa County, Arizona
- Coordinates: 33°50′49″N 112°15′58″W
- Purpose: Irrigation, power
- Status: Operational
- Construction began: 1985
- Opening date: 1994
- Construction cost: $625 million
- Owner: U.S. Bureau of Reclamation
- Operator: Central Arizona Project

Dam and spillways
- Type of dam: Embankment, zoned earth-fill
- Impounds: Agua Fria River
- Height (foundation): 440 ft (130 m)
- Height (thalweg): 300 ft (91 m)
- Length: 4,700 ft (1,400 m)
- Width (crest): 35 ft (11 m)
- Width (base): 1,514 ft (461 m)
- Dam volume: 16,200,000 cu yd (12,400,000 m^{3})
- Spillways: 2
- Spillway type: Un-gated, free-flow, Fuse plug embankment
- Spillway capacity: 316,000 cu ft/s (8,900 m^{3}/s) (combined; at elevation)

Reservoir
- Creates: Lake Pleasant
- Total capacity: 1,108,600 acre⋅ft (1.3674×10^{9} m^{3})
- Catchment area: 1,459 sq mi (3,780 km^{2})
- Surface area: 12,040 acres (4,870 ha)
- Normal elevation: 1,725 ft (526 m) (maximum)

Power Station
- Commission date: 1994
- Turbines: 4 x 11.25 MW (15,090 hp) pump-generators
- Installed capacity: 45 MW (60,000 hp)

The New Waddell Dam is an embankment dam on the Agua Fria River in Maricopa County, Arizona, 35 miles (56 km) northwest of Phoenix. It serves as part of the Central Arizona Project (CAP) while also providing water for the Maricopa Water District. The dam creates Lake Pleasant with water from the Agua Fria and also the CAP aqueduct. In addition, it affords flood protection, hydroelectric power production and recreational opportunities. Construction on the dam began in 1985 and ended in 1994. Its reservoir submerged the Old Waddell Dam which was completed in 1927 after decades of planning.

== History ==
=== Old Waddell Dam ===
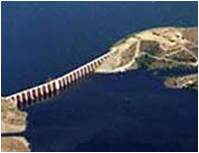
The Old Waddell Dam approximately halfway submerged under rising waters of the new reservoir, circa 1992

First referred to as the Frogs Tank Dam, the original Waddell Dam was the ambition of local businessmen who wanted to develop a project that used the Agua Fria for the irrigation of around 100,000 acres (40,000 ha) of land. This was to be accomplished with a storage dam, diversion dam and system of canals. The project began in 1888 with the formation of the Agua Fria Water and Land Company. The company hired George Beardsley's Agua Fria Construction Company, and in 1892, construction on the project began. In 1895, Beardsley died, and his brother William who was now president of the Water and Land Company helped continue the project. In 1896, due to a lack of funding caused by poor nationwide economic conditions, the project was halted. The Water and Land Company soon went bankrupt, but William Beardsley kept the project alive. Work had been primarily done on the diversion dam and canal while only the foundation of the storage dam, a gravity dam, was completed. The diversion dam, Camp Dyer Diversion Dam, was named after Edgar J. Dyer, a surveyor on the project.

After nearly 30 years of struggling with funding, William Beardsley hired engineer Carl Pleasant to assist with the design. Pleasant recommended hiring the engineer firm Peckham and James to draft plans for the storage dam at the Frogs Tank site. The gravity dam design was dropped, and a relatively new, cheaper and improved but controversial design was adopted: the multiple-arch buttress dam. In 1925, under a new state law, Beardsley was able to create the Beardsley-Agua Fria Water Conservation District. The new district could raise funds through a bond issue. On December 20, 1925, the construction contract was signed, but the bonds had yet to be purchased. Five days before the contract was signed, Beardsley died. His son, Robert took over the project along with Pleasant. In early 1926, Pleasant sold the needed bonds to the New York firm Brandon, Gordon and Waddell. The firm sent Donald Ware Waddell to oversee construction.

Although the building of worker camps and site preparation had begun in 1925, the main construction began in 1926 with the diversion of the Agua Fria River. That same year, the dam was renamed to Pleasant Dam. By February 1927, concrete pouring for the 20 buttresses was nearing completion. The dam was complete in October 1927. Its construction had employed up to 600 workers and cost over $3.3 million. Prior to its inauguration, cracks were discovered in the dam buttresses. This caused intense concerns over whether the new design would be safe in the long-term, which delayed its inauguration until February 1928. The situation was exacerbated on March 12, 1928 when the St. Francis Dam in California had a catastrophic failure. In 1929, after a series of hearings and debates, which eventually reached the state legislature, the State Water Commissioner ordered the spillway for the dam to be lowered 24 feet (7.3 m) to prevent excess water levels and stress on the dam. It was also required that specific water levels in the reservoir be maintained. The dam was rehabilitated until 1935, and a steel roadbed was installed atop it that same year. In the early 1960s, it was renamed the Waddell Dam.

=== New Waddell Dam ===
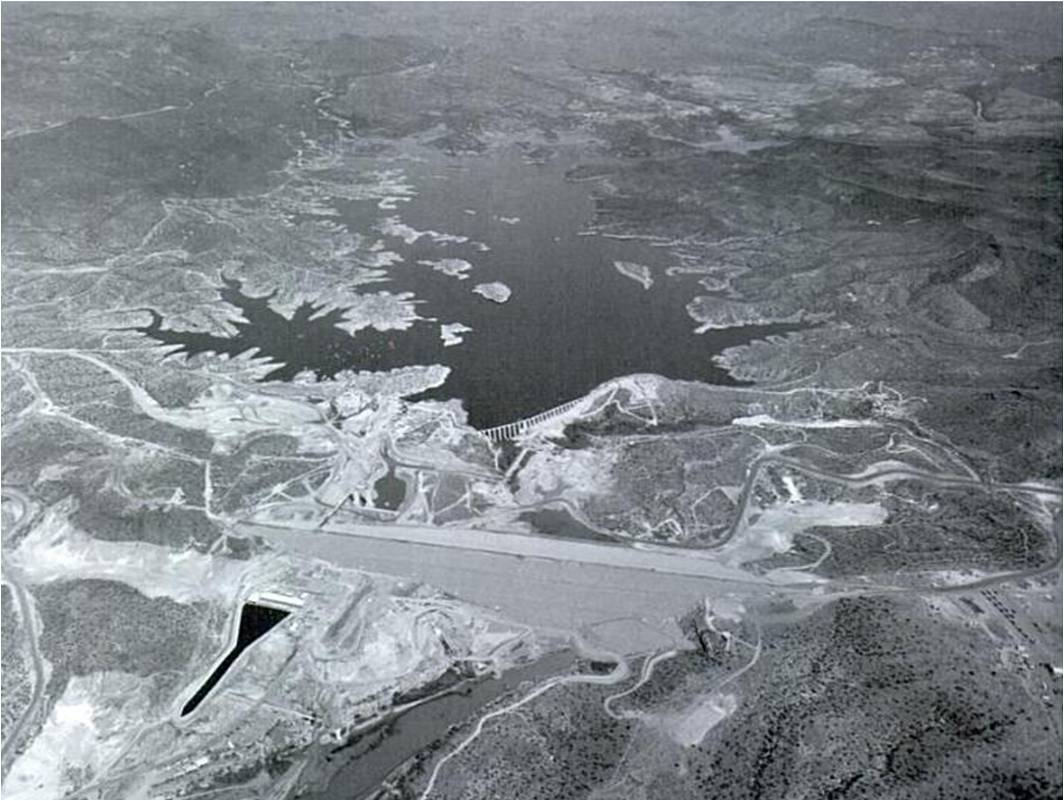
The New Waddell Dam in 1992 with Old Waddell Dam in background

In 1973, construction on the Central Arizona Project (CAP) began while many of its facilities were still being planned and approved. One integral part of the project was a storage dam on the Salt River, Orme Dam. However, in 1977, US President Jimmy Carter recommended that Orme Dam and two other projects on the Gila River System be removed from the CAP plan because of their negative impacts and cost. While the two other projects (Hooker and Charleston Dam) were easily removed, Orme was not. Orme's removal was hampered by controversy that led to the creation of the Central Arizona Water Control Study (CAWCS) in 1979 after Secretary of the Interior Cecil D. Andrus requested that the Bureau of Reclamation identify a replacement. In 1980, the CAWCS recommended the removal of any storage units on the Gila River. Recent flooding within the CAWCS area and the Orme Dam problem led to an expansion of the study to include dams for flood control.

Three years later, the Bureau of Reclamation and the State of Arizona agreed on an alternative to Orme. This was known as Plan 6, and it recommended four projects: a reconstruction of the Stewart Mountain Dam, a new or larger Roosevelt Dam, the Cliff Dam on the Verde River and finally, the New Waddell Dam on the Agua Fria River (a tributary of the Gila River). On November 6, 1981, the Secretary of the Interior James G. Watt recommended Plan 6. In April 1984, it was approved with the exception of the Cliff Dam, which needed further study and would eventually be removed from CAP.

In 1985, construction on the New Waddell Dam began with the excavation of its foundation. A diversion tunnel was constructed along with another to divert water releases from the Old Waddell Dam into the Beardsley Canal. Construction on the dam's intakes continued through 1991, and by the end of 1992, a controlled breach was performed on two arches of the Old Waddell Dam, allowing its reservoir to fill freely behind the New Waddell Dam, which was already mostly inundated. By 1994, the reservoir was filled and had nearly tripled the size of the Old Waddell Dam reservoir. That same year, the dam's pump-generating plant (New Waddell Pump-Generating Plant) began operation. The dam's cost was in excess of $625 million. Large sediment releases from the New Waddell Dam deteriorated the Camp Dyer Diversion Dam 1.25 miles (2.01 km) downstream. This masonry dam had to be rehabilitated by the Bureau in 1992.

== Design and operation ==
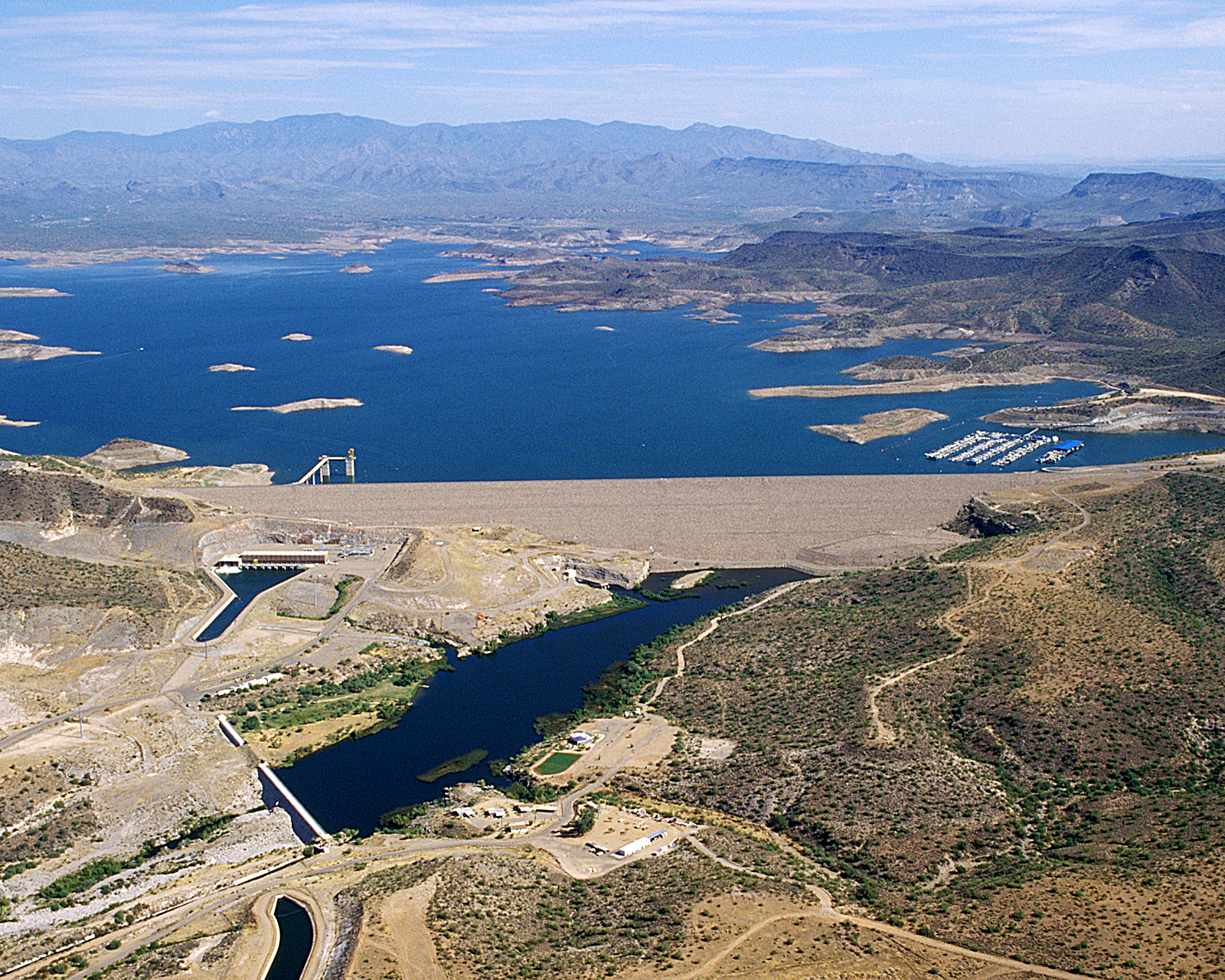
The New Waddell Dam with adjacent irrigation and power facilities

The New Waddell Dam is 300 ft (91 m) high from the riverbed and 440 feet (130 m) high from its bedrock foundation. It is a zoned earth-fill type and is 4,700 ft (1,433 m) long; containing 16,200,000 cu yd (12,385,789 m^{3}) of material. The dam has a crest width of 35 feet (11 m) and a base width of 1,514 feet (461 m). The reservoir created by the dam, Lake Pleasant, has a capacity of 1,108,600 acre-feet (1.3674×10^{9} m^{3}) at its maximum elevation above sea level: 1,725 feet (526 m). At maximum elevation, its surface area is 12,040 acres (4,870 ha). The maximum conservation storage level of the reservoir is 1,702 feet (519 m) when the reservoir has a surface area of 9,970 acres (4,030 ha). Conservation storage for the reservoir is 812,100 acre-feet (1.0017×10^{9} m^{3}) and minimum storage 40,500 acre-feet (50,000,000 m^{3}). The dam sits at the head of a 1,459 square miles (3,780 km^{2}) catchment area.

Located 1.25 miles (2.01 km) northwest of the dam and serving excess water levels are two different spillways: a 590 feet (180 m) long un-gated free flow with a crest elevation of 1,706.5 feet (520.1 m) and a 370 feet (110 m) long fuse plug embankment with an elevation of 1,711 feet (522 m). The free flow spillway has a discharge capacity of 187,000 cubic feet per second (5,300 m^{3}/s) and the fuse plug 129,000 cubic feet per second (3,700 m^{3}/s). At an elevation of 1,728 feet (527 m), both spillways would have a combined capacity of 316,000 cubic feet per second (8,900 m^{3}/s).

Water from the dam's reservoir is released through its outlet works or power plant to either the Waddell Canal or into Hank Raymond Lake, which is formed just downstream of the dam by the Camp Dryer Diversion Dam. The diversion dam is a composite concrete and masonry dam with a height of 79 feet (24 m) and length of 872 feet (266 m). It can store up to 590 acre-feet (730,000 m^{3}) at an elevation of 1,445 feet (440 m). Water from Hank Raymond Lake is diverted into the Beardsley Canal, which has a main extension 33 miles (53 km) long to serve 60 square miles (160 km^{2}) of the Maricopa Water District (MWD). The Beardsley Canal also has an interconnection 4.5 miles (7.2 km) south of the dam at 33°46′48″N 112°16′54″W with the CAP aqueduct that allows it to receive additional water from that source. Water released into the 4.7 miles (7.6 km) long Waddell Canal first travels under the Agua Fria River via a 2,440 feet (740 m) long siphon before being returned to the surface canal where it continues south to meet the CAP aqueduct just west of Arizona State Route 303. The capacity of the pump-generating plant, Waddall Canal and siphon is 3,000 cubic feet per second (85 m^{3}/s) while the outlet works for the diversion dam and Beardsley Canal are 5,600 cubic feet per second (160 m^{3}/s), but only 4,300 cubic feet per second (120 m^{3}/s) can be diverted to the canals at a time.

Water from the New Waddell Dam reservoir augments supply in the CAP and helps deliver 15% more CAP water to Arizona. Water in Lake Pleasant is divided between the CAP (658,300 acre-feet (812,000,000 m^{3})) and MWD (162,142 acre-feet (199,999,000 m^{3})). Water from the CAP aqueduct is also drawn into Lake Pleasant via the New Waddell Pump-Generating Plant. During the winter months, when energy rates are low, additional water in the aqueduct is pumped a maximum of 192 feet (59 m) up into the lake for storage. During the summer months, when energy rates are higher, water is released back down through the generators for hydroelectric power production. Sale of this electricity is being used to pay part of the dam's cost. The pump-generating plant contains four pumps and four pump-generators and has an installed capacity of 45 megawatts (60,000 hp).

== Recreation ==
Lake Pleasant, created by the dam, offers recreational opportunities to tourists and locals. The lake is served by a marina and surrounding areas containing over 450 picnic sites, 225 camping sites and several miles of trails. Because the lake is seasonal, fluctuating up to 125 feet (38 m) annually, these facilities are located for accessibility.

== Environmental impact ==
Before the New Waddell Dam was constructed, two phases of a three-phase study were carried out to determine the effect of the dam on fisheries. Completed in 2005, the third phase of the study determined that the expanded reservoir has reduced nutrient concentrations due to added CAP water and that water level fluctuations have reduced fish cover, likely affecting food and spawning. Large mouth bass populations have also declined but striped bass have entered the lake, likely by eggs transferred through CAP water. Around the lake, Reclamation has taken steps to protect wildlife habitats for bald eagles and Gila topminnows.
