= Pleasant Lake =

Pleasant Lake may refer to:

== Lakes ==
- Pleasant Lake (Maine), in Aroostook County
- Pleasant Lake (Crooked River), in Cumberland and Oxford counties, Maine
- Pleasant Lake (St. Joseph County, Michigan)
- Pleasant Lake (Waterford Township, Michigan), in Oakland County
- Pleasant Lake (Deerfield, New Hampshire), in Rockingham County
- Pleasant Lake (New London, New Hampshire), in Merrimack County
- Pleasant Lake (Macomb, St. Lawrence County, New York)
- Pleasant Lake (Stratford, New York), in Fulton County

== Communities ==
=== Canada ===
- Pleasant Lake, a community in Yarmouth County, Nova Scotia

=== United States ===
- Pleasant Lake, Indiana
- Pleasant Lake, Massachusetts
- Pleasant Lake, Michigan
- Pleasant Lake, Minnesota
- Pleasant Lake, North Dakota
- Pleasant Lake Township, Benson County, North Dakota

== See also ==
- Lake Pleasant (disambiguation)
- Pleasant Lake station (disambiguation)
- Pleasant Pond, in Caratunk, Maine
