= Stored Energy at Sea =

Submerged offshore pump storage system

The Stored Energy at Sea (StEnSEA) project is a pump storage system designed to store significant quantities of electrical energy offshore. After research and development, it was tested on a model scale in November 2016. It is designed to link in well with offshore wind platforms and their issues caused by electrical production fluctuations. It works by water flowing into a container, at significant pressure, thus driving a turbine. When there is spare electricity the water is pumped out, allowing electricity to be generated at a time of increased need.

== Development history ==
In 2011, the physics Prof. Dr Horst Schmidt-Böcking (Goethe University Frankfurt) and Dr. Gerhard Luther (Saarland University) had the idea of a pump storage system that would be placed on the sea bed. This system would use the high water pressure at great water depths to store energy in hollow bodies.

Shortly after their idea was published on 1 April 2011 in the newspaper Frankfurter Allgemeine Zeitung, a consortium of the Fraunhofer Institute for Energy Economics and Energy System Technology and the construction company Hochtief AG was set up. In collaboration they conducted a first preliminary sketch, which proved the feasibility of the pump storage concept. Subsequently, the German Federal Ministry for Economic Affairs and Energy supported the development and testing of the new concept.

Financial support through the BMWi
	Executive agency	Supported period	Total granted
A	Hochtief Solutions AG	2013-01-01 to 2014-02-10	63.572,50 EUR
B	Fraunhofer Institute for Energy Economics and Energy System Technology	2013-01-01 to 2017-06-30	2.131.715,89 EUR

== Physical principle ==
The functionality of a seawater pressure storage power plant is based on usual pumped-hydro storage plants. A hollow concrete sphere with an integrated pump-turbine will be installed on the bottom of the sea. Compared to well known pumped-hydro storage plants, the sea that surrounds the sphere represents the upper water basin. The hollow sphere represents the lower water basin. The StEnSea concept uses the high water pressure difference between the hollow sphere and the surrounding sea, which is about 75 bar (≈1 bar per 10 meters).

In case of overproduction of adjacent energy sources such as wind turbines or photovoltaic systems, the pump-turbine will be enabled to pump water from the cavity against the pressure into the surrounding sea. An empty hollow sphere means a fully charged storage system. When electricity is needed, water from the surrounding sea is guided through the turbine into the cavity, generating electricity. The higher the pressure difference between hollow sphere and the surrounding sea, the higher the energy yield during discharging. While discharging the hollow sphere a vacuum will be created inside. To avoid cavitation, the pump turbines and all other electrical components are placed in a centrally mounted cylinder. An auxiliary feed pump in the bottom of the cylinder is required to fill the cylinder with water and produces an inside pressure.

"Both pumps require an input pressure above the net positive suction head to avoid cavitation while pumping water from the inner volume into the cylinder or from the cylinder out of the sphere. As the pressure difference for the additional pump is much lower than for the pump turbine the required input pressure is lower as well. The input pressure of both pumps is given by the water column above them. For the additional pump this is the water column in the sphere and for the pump turbine it is the water column in the cylinder."

The maximum capacity for the hollow concrete sphere depends on the total pump-turbine efficiency, the installation depth and the inner volume.

$C_{max}=\frac{\rho_{water} \cdot \eta_{turb} \cdot d \cdot g \cdot V_{inner}}{3,69E9}$

The stored energy is proportional to the ambient pressure in the depths of the sea. Problems considered during the construction of the hollow sphere were choosing a construction-type that withstands the high water-pressure and which is heavy enough to keep the buoyancy force lower than the gravitational force. This resulted in the spherical construction with an inner diameter of 28.6 meter and a 2.72 meter thick wall made of normal watertight concrete.

Relevant technical parameters of a StEnSea unit:
Parameter	Value	Unit
Construction depth	750	m
Inner diameter of the hollow sphere	28.6	m
Hollow sphere volumina	12,200	m³/unit
Electrical storage capacity	18.3	MWh/unit
Installed electrical capacity	5	MW/unit
Specific storage capacity	0.715	kWh/m³
Units per storage farm	5-140	units
Turbine efficiency	0.82	
Pump efficiency	0.89	
Total efficiency	0.73	

=== Pilot test ===
To prove feasibility under real conditions and to acquire measurement data, the Fraunhofer engineers started implementing a pilot project. Hochtief Solutions AG constructed a pilot hollow sphere at a scale of 1:10 out of concrete, with an outer diameter of three meters and an inner volume of eight m^{3}. On 9 November 2016 it was installed in Lake Constance at a depth of 100 meters and tested for four weeks.

During the test phase, the engineers were able to successfully store energy and operate the system in different operating modes. The engineers also studied whether a pressure equalization line to the surface is required. In case of application without the compensating cable, a reduction of costs and expense would be possible. The pilot test revealed, that both operation variants work and would be possible to run.

In the next step, a possible test location in the sea for the carrying out of a demonstration project is to be scrutinized. Then a sphere with the planned demonstration diameter of 30 meters should be built and installed at a suitable location in the sea. Possible places of installation situated near a coast would be for example the Norwegian trench or some Spanish sea areas.

Furthermore, partners from the industry financing half of the project must be found, in order to receive further public funding from the BMWi. Because the total costs for the demonstration project are estimated at a low double-digit million euro amount.

== Potential installation sites ==
The identification of potential installation sites was undertaken in three consecutive steps. At first, the designation of several arguments depicting the quality of a potential location were determined. Besides the installation depth, which is the main factor involved, variables like slope, geomorphology, distance to a possible grid connection point as well as to bases for servicing and set-up, marine reserves and the requirement for power storage in the surroundings were taken into account.

In the following step, specific values were assigned to the hard parameters, which are required for the use of the technology. Many of these values were determined in a previous feasibility analysis, a few had to be assessed by using comparable applications from different offshore industries. The installation depth of the concrete sphere should be 600-800m below the sea level and have an angle of inclination of less than or equal to 1°. In addition, it is required to reach the next grid connection point within one hundred kilometres as well as a basis, from which maintenance and repair measures can be carried out. Furthermore, an installation basis should not be more than 500 km away and areas with inappropriate geomorphology for example canyons were excluded.

Finally, a global location analysis, based on geo-datasets and the above defined restrictions, was carried out with a Geographical Information System (GIS). In order to make a statement about the potential storage capacities, the resulting areas were assigned to the Exclusive Economic Zones (EEZ) of the affected states. Those and the corresponding capacities for storing electricity are displayed in the table below.

TOP 10 countries worldwide
Country	Area [km^{2}]	Share of total area	Capacity [Gwh]
Total Area	111.659	100%	817.344
TOP 10	85.925	77%	628.971
United States	85.925	9%	74.854
Japan	9.511	9%	69.621
Saudi Arabia	8.535	8%	62.476
Indonesia	8.002	7%	58.575
Bahamas	6.201	6%	45.391
Libya	5.836	5%	42.720
Italy	5.572	5%	40.787
Spain	4.299	4%	31.469
Greece	3.476	3%	25.444
Kenya	3.307	3%	24.207

== Economic assessment of StEnSea ==
StEnSea is a modular high capacity energy storage technology. Its profitability depends on installed units (concrete hollows) per facility (causing scale effects), on the realized arbitrages on the energy market and it depends on the operating hours per year. As well as on the investment and operation cost.

In the following chart the relevant economic parameters for an economic assessment are pictured. About 800 to 1000 full operation cycles per annum are required.

For the operation and management of a storage farm, personal expenditure is based on 0.5 - 2 staff per storage farm, depending on the farm capacity. Labor costs of 70 k€ per year and member of staff are used for the calculation. The price arbitrage is set to be 6 €ct per kWh for the economic assessment, resulting from an average electricity purchase price of 2 €ct per kWh and an average sale price of 8 €ct kWh. This price arbitrage includes the purchase of other services such as the provision of positive or negative balance power, frequency control or reactive power, all of which are not separately considered in the calculations. Planning and approval costs include costs for the site evaluation (as prerequisite for the permission), power plant certification, as well as the project development and management.

Relevant economic parameters
		Units
Economic useful lifetime		
Construction	20	a
Machinery	7-20	a
Repair and maintenance		
Construction	1,5	% of investment
Machinery	3	% of investment
Insurance	0,5	% of investment
Calculatory interest rate	7	%
Labor costs	70	k€/a staff
Manpower requirements	0.5-2	staff/farm
Average electricity purchase price	2	€ Cent/kWh
Average electricity sale price	8	€ Cent/kWh
Annual operation cycles	800-1000	
Rate of price increase other costs	2	%/a
Rate of price increase capital costs	2	%/a
Planning and approval	1070-1040	k€/unit
Costs for grid connection	15	% of investm.

Depending on the number of storage units per farm, the unit specific costs for planning and approval vary in the range from 1,070 mio.€ at 120 units to 1,74 mio.€ at 5 units. Also the annuities depend directly on the number of installed units. With 120 units an annuity of 544k€ can be achieved, while only a 232k€ annuity with 5 installed units only is possible.

Economic performance of a StEnSEA unit as part of a subsea storage farm
Number of units per storage farm	120	80	40	20	5
Investment [in 1000 €]					
Concrete sphere (including installation)	2,470	2,670	2,720	2,770	2,870
Pump turbine	2,340	2,600	2,730	2,860	3,120
Screen system	119	132	139	145	158
Measurement and control installation	50	50	50	50	50
Grid connection	1,785	1,800	1,845	1,865	1,910
Planning and approval	1,069	1,154	1,221	1,313	1,742
Total investment	7,832	8,406	8,704	9,003	9,850
Yearly costs and revenues [1000 €/a]					
Capital related costs	956	1,034	1,074	1,115	1,218
Operational related costs	130	144	152	157	173
Demand related costs	191	191	191	191	191
Other costs	39	42	44	45	47
Total costs	1,317	1,411	1,460	1,507	1,629
Total revenues	1,861	1,861	1,861	1,861	1,861
Annuity	544	450	401	354	232

=== Ecological effects ===
Due to the main components of the construction (primarily steel, concrete for the hollow and cables for the connection), this system presents minimal risks to the eco-system. To avoid sea animals being sucked into the turbine a fine meshed grid is installed. In addition, the flow speed of the water rushing into the hollow is kept low.

== Media coverage ==
A video post on the public television station ZDF called the hollow concrete balls a “possible solution to store solar and wind energy”. The gained data helped to understand the project better. For further tests on a bigger scale Christian Dick, also a member of the Fraunhofer IEE team, thinks about constructing a big concrete hollow upon the sea.

The TV station ZDF nano produced a documentary about the field study StEnSea in Lake Constance (German: Bodensee). Christian Dick was cited that “the ball exactly worked like it was supposed to work”. The most important finding was that an air-connection to the surface is not needed, reducing the technical effort significantly. Project leader Matthias Puchta from Fraunhofer IEE said “by pumping out the water we created a nearly total vacuum. Demonstrating that was very exciting, because nobody was able to do that before by using this technology. We showed it works.” For maintenance and possible technical problems the technology will be located in a cylinder, easy to recover and maintain with a robotic submarine. After all this technology could be “a mosaic of our future energy supply".

This opinion was shared by Swiss radio channel SRF as they reported about the project as a “potentially path-breaking experiment”. Thanks to the successful project in the lake, where energy was fed in a test grid and drawn from it, the team intends to install a concrete ball of a diameter 10 times larger than the pilot project (30 meters). Due to Germany's too shallow coastlines, the country will not be used for further projects. The Spanish coastline offers good conditions for a long-term project. This long-term project should last between three and five years under real-life conditions and is supposed to gain the data for the subsequent commercialization.

Der Spiegel reported that the technology of StEnSea could be also interesting for offshore wind parks. The economically efficient storage of surplus energy is one of the key tasks for the grid and the energy market, as more and more renewables are taken into the system. Therefore, the technology's role in reorganizing the energy system can be crucial.
