= Solidago inornata =

Scientific classification
- Kingdom: Plantae
- Clade: Tracheophytes
- Clade: Angiosperms
- Clade: Eudicots
- Clade: Asterids
- Order: Asterales
- Family: Asteraceae
- Genus: Solidago
- Species: S. inornata

Binomial name
- Solidago inornata Lunell

Synonyms
- Doria inornata (Lunell) Lunell

Species of flowering plant

Solidago inornata is a rare North American plant species in the family Asteraceae. It is native to the states of Minnesota and North Dakota in the north-central United States. It was first described in 1911 from specimens collected near Pleasant Lake in Benson County.

Solidago inornata is a small perennial herb up to 10 cm (4 inches) tall. Leaves are lance-shaped. Flower heads are each about 3 mm high. Leaves are lance-shaped, firm and rigid. The plant produces only a few flower heads compared to other species of goldenrod, the heads borne in branching arrays at the tops of the stems.
