= Orme Dam =

Proposed dam in Maricopa County, Arizona

Orme Dam was a proposed storage dam in the US state of Arizona. The United States Congress approved the Central Arizona Project (CAP) in 1968, which called for the construction of Orme Dam at the confluence of the Salt and Verde Rivers, 18 miles northeast of Phoenix. It would have flooded about 15,000 acres of the Fort McDowell Yavapai Nation, half the Nation's total land area. Backers of the dam believed it was crucial to Arizona's economy.

In 1977, US President Jimmy Carter recommended that Orme Dam and two other projects on the Gila River system be removed from the CAP plan because of their negative impacts and cost. However, political pressure from the Arizona congressional delegation, particularly senators Barry Goldwater and Dennis DeConcini and Representative John Rhodes, led to the reconsideration of Orme Dam and alternatives in a multi-million dollar project, the Central Arizona Water Control Study. The controversy led to the creation of the Central Arizona Water Control Study (CAWCS) in 1979 after Secretary of the Interior Cecil D. Andrus requested that the Bureau of Reclamation identify a replacement. In 1980, the CAWCS recommended the removal of any storage units on the Gila River. Recent flooding within the CAWCS area and the Orme Dam problem led to an expansion of the study to include dams for flood control.

Three years later, the Bureau of Reclamation and the State of Arizona agreed on an alternative to Orme. This was known as Plan 6, and it recommended four projects: a reconstruction of the Stewart Mountain Dam, a new or larger Roosevelt Dam, the Cliff Dam on the Verde River and finally, the New Waddell Dam on the Agua Fria River (a tributary of the Gila River). On November 6, 1981, the Secretary of the Interior James G. Watt recommended Plan 6. In April 1984, it was approved. The Orme Dam project was finally abandoned in 1981, after over 10 years of struggle and legal battles. Opponents of the dam successfully used the Environmental Impact Statement required by the National Environmental Policy Act to highlight the detrimental impact the project would have on many endangered species in the area.

== See also ==
- Yavapai Wars
