= Lake Pleasant =

Lake Pleasant may refer to a location in the United States:

- Lake Pleasant Regional Park, park in Arizona containing a lake of the same name
  - Lake Pleasant Camp
- Lake Pleasant, Massachusetts, a village
- Lake Pleasant Township, Red Lake County, Minnesota
- Lake Pleasant, New York, a town
  - Lake Pleasant (Hamilton County, New York), a lake
  - Lake Pleasant (hamlet), New York, a community in the town of Lake Pleasant and county seat of Hamilton County
- Lake Pleasant (Washington), a lake on the Olympic Peninsula

== See also ==
- Pleasant Lake (disambiguation)
