= Maricopa Trail =

Trail in Maricopa County, Arizona

Coordinates: 34°N 112°W

- Length: 80 mi (130 km)
- Location: Maricopa County, Arizona, US
- Trailheads: Loop trail (no endpoints)
- Use: Hiking, horseback riding, mountain biking, inline skating (portions)
- Difficulty: Easy
- Season: Year-round
- Sights: Multiple regional and municipal parks

The Maricopa Trail is a 315 miles (507 km) trail located within Maricopa County connecting the major regional and municipal parks in and around the Phoenix metropolitan area. A loop trail encircling much of the urbanized area, the trail also consists of four spurs that will connect the loop with outlying mountain parks in the region.

Conceptualized in 1997 by the Maricopa County Parks and Recreation Department, the Maricopa Trail was envisioned as a pedestrian beltway that would connect nine of the department's ten regional parks, linking them with the city of Phoenix's South Mountain Park and encouraging their use by the area's residents. Planning on the trail began in earnest in 2000 with the formation of a trails planning commission with the aim of developing a regional trail system. As the centerpiece of the planned regional system, the Maricopa Trail was designed to incorporate as many of the region's parks and recreation areas, as well as providing connections with other regional trails such as the Arizona Trail. The name "Maricopa Trail" was selected in 2003, and the entire plan was approved by the Maricopa County Board of Supervisors on August 16, 2004.

The trail incorporates existing portions of the Sun Circle Trail, the National Trail in South Mountain Park, portions of the trails within White Tank Mountain Regional Park and Cave Creek Regional Park, and pathways already developed along the McMicken corridor in Surprise. Construction on new segments of the trail began in 2006 and has brought the total length of the existing corridors to approximately 80 miles (130 km) as of November 2009. Work on the trail has cost the county $1.74 million through 2009 with an additional $3.28 million budgeted over a five-year period, primarily for land acquisition. Large portions of the trail will be unpaved. Department planners hope to have the trail completed by 2014. Phase 1 of the trail was completed in October 2018.

Significant portions of the trail take advantage of existing canal embankments, following the Western Canal in Tempe and Gilbert and the McMicken flood control channel in the northwest. Future segments will also follow the Central Arizona Project canal near Mesa. Natural waterways will also be a prominent part of the route, with segments paralleling the Agua Fria, the Gila and the Salt Rivers, with multiple segments following and crossing other intermittent streams in the area. The trail will also pass through or connect to local mountain areas including the White Tank Mountains, South Mountains, Sierra Estrella and the McDowell Mountains. Portions of the trail also pass through the Tonto National Forest.

== Parks ==
The Maricopa Trail connects nine county parks as well as one municipal park and one national forest:

- Buckeye Hills Regional Park (spur route)
- Cave Creek Regional Park
- Estrella Mountain Regional Park
- Lake Pleasant Regional Park
- McDowell Mountain Regional Park
- San Tan Mountains Regional Park (spur route)
- South Mountain Park
- Spur Cross Ranch Conservation Area
- Tonto National Forest, Cave Creek Ranger District
- Tonto National Forest, Mesa Ranger District (spur route)
- Usery Mountain Regional Park (spur route)
- White Tank Mountain Regional Park (spur route)
