= Pleasant Valley Airport =

Airport in Maricopa County, Arizona

- IATA: none; ICAO: none; FAA LID: P48

Summary
- Airport type: Public
- Owner/Operator: Pleasant Valley Airport Association
- Serves: Peoria, Arizona
- Elevation AMSL: 1,580 ft / 480 m
- Coordinates: 33.8010°N 112.2498°W

Map

Runways
Direction	Length		Surface
Direction	ft	m	Surface
5L/23R	4,200	1,280	Dirt
5C/23C	4,200	1,280	Dirt
5R/23L	4,200	1,280	Dirt
14/32	2,400	732	Dirt
- Source: Federal Aviation Administration

Pleasant Valley Airport (ICAO: P48) was a privately owned public-use airport located in Peoria, in Maricopa County, Arizona, United States. The airport long since serviced small aircraft into the Lake Pleasant Regional Park area, however, in 2022 it was closed due to the lease for the land (on state Trust Land) not being renewed.

== Facilities and aircraft ==
Pleasant Valley Airport covered an area of 100 acres (40 ha) at an elevation of 1,580 feet (480 m) above mean sea level. It had four dirt runways:

- 5L/23R measuring 4,200 x 100 feet (1,280 x 30 m)
- 5C/23C measuring 4,200 x 100 feet (1,280 x 30 m)
- 5R/23L measuring 4,200 x 100 feet (1,280 x 30 m)
- 14/32 measuring 2,400 x 100 feet (732 x 30 m)

For the 12-month period ending April 24, 2008, the airport had 75,000 general aviation aircraft operations, an average of 205 per day. At that time there were 19 aircraft based at this airport: 14 single-engine and 5 ultralight.

== See also ==
- List of airports in Arizona
