= Saguaro Lake =

Reservoir in Maricopa County, Arizona

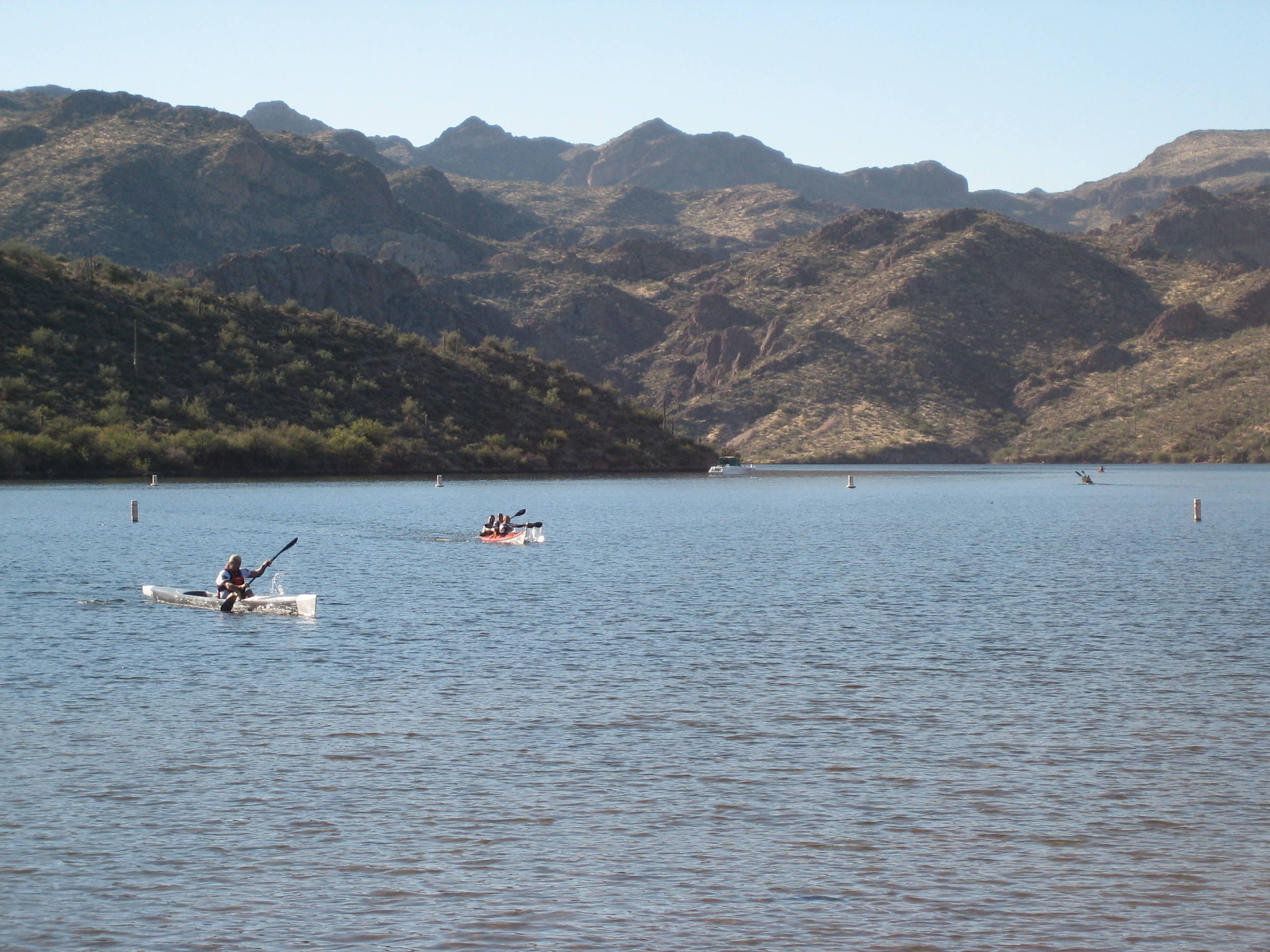
- During the Desert Rage Adventure Race 2005

- Location within Arizona
- Location: Maricopa County, Arizona, United States
- Coordinates: 33°33′56″N 111°32′10″W
- Lake type: reservoir
- Primary inflows: Salt River
- Primary outflows: Salt River
- Basin countries: United States
- Managing agency: Salt River Project
- Surface area: 1,264 acres (512 ha)
- Average depth: 90 ft (27 m)
- Surface elevation: 1,506 ft (459 m)
- Website: Official website
- References: GNIS feature ID 33945

Saguaro Lake is the fourth reservoir on the Salt River, formed by the Stewart Mountain Dam in the U.S. state of Arizona. The lake is off State Route 87, about halfway between Phoenix and the ghost town of Sunflower. The dammed end of the lake is at 33°33′56″N 111°32′10″W, at an elevation of 1,506 feet (459 m).

This lake is within the Tonto National Forest; the facilities are managed by that authority.

A large fish kill was documented in the lake in 2017-2019 and in 2022, due to golden algae.

== Fishing ==
The lake is good for champion bass and carp fishing. Species that can be caught in the lake include: Rainbow trout, Largemouth bass, Smallmouth bass, Yellow bass, Crappie, Sunfish, Channel catfish, Walleye, Tilapia, Yellow perch and Carp.

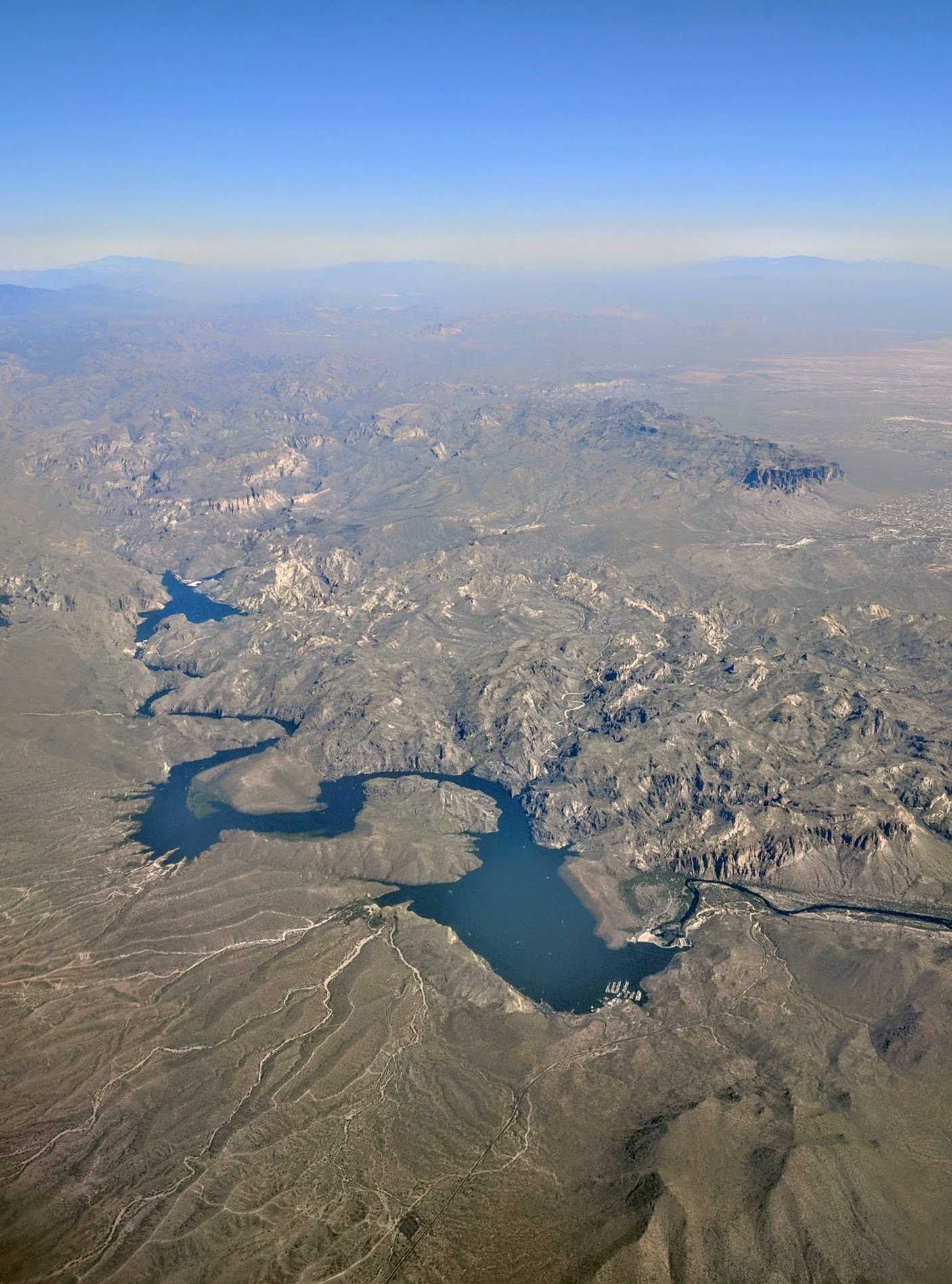
Aerial view of the lake and the Salt River

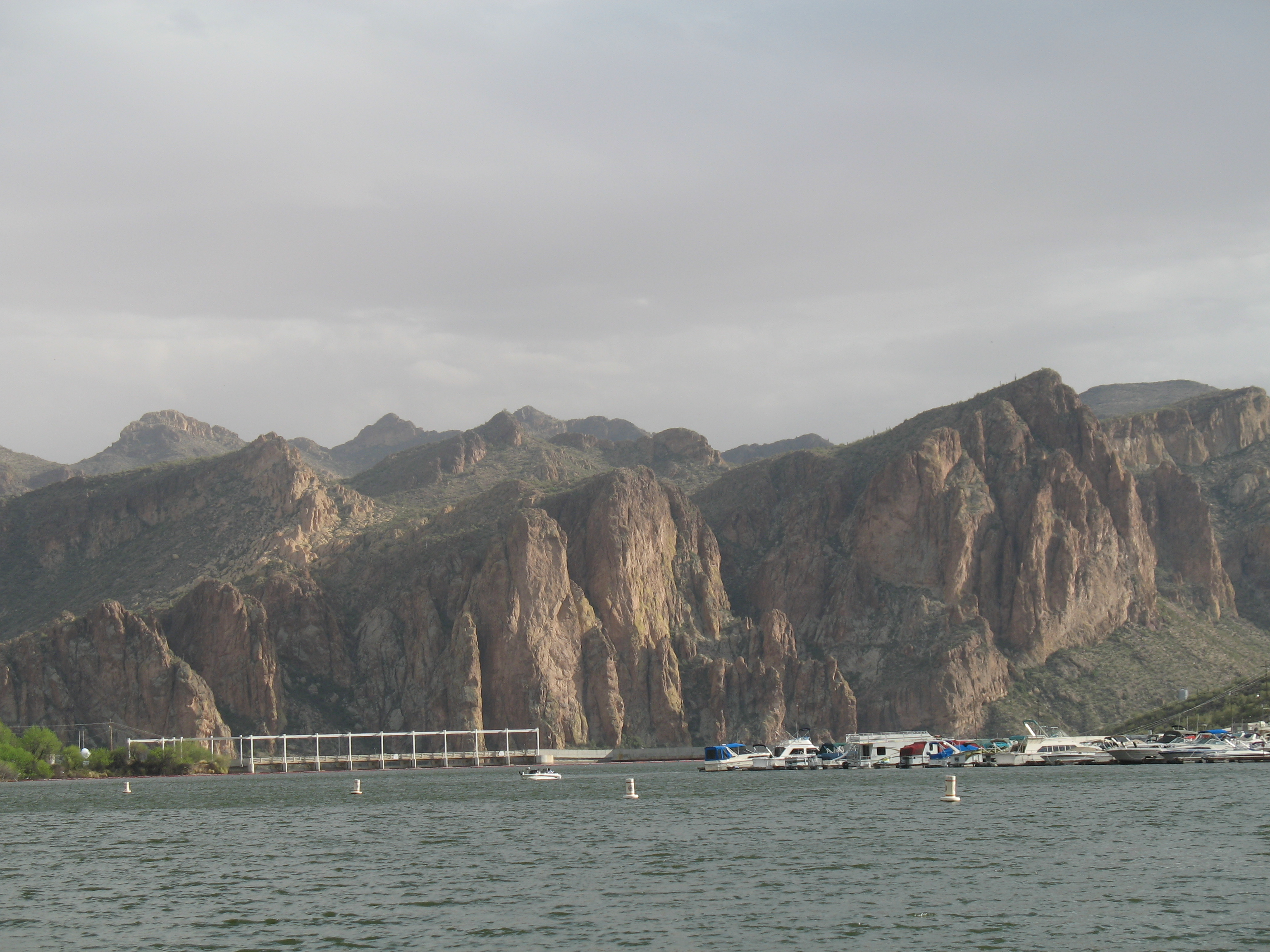
Saguaro Lake and marina. (2007)

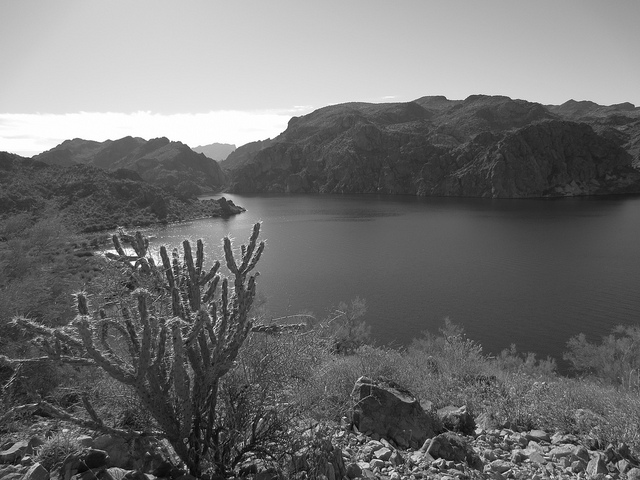
Lake Saguaro Hiking Trail

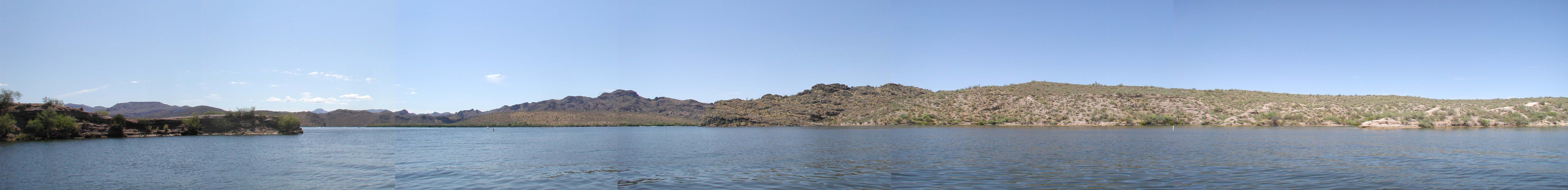
Panoramic photo of Saguaro Lake
