= Hooker Dam =

Unbuilt proposed dam on the Gila River in New Mexico

Coordinates: 33.0615°N 108.5375°W

Hooker Dam was a proposed dam on the Gila River in New Mexico, planned as a major component of the Central Arizona Project. Located near the mouth of the river's canyon upstream from the confluence of the Gila with Mogollon Creek and below Turkey Creek, the dam was to be part of the CAP's Gila River Division, authorized under the 1968 Colorado River Basin Project Act. The project was planned to provide 18,000 acre-feet (0.022 km^{3})/year of water to western New Mexico.

Hooker Dam was to be located in Gila National Forest near the boundary of the Gila Wilderness. The proposed reservoir would have extended into the Gila Wilderness. Opposition to the dam came from The Wilderness Society and the Sierra Club, as well as from Arizona, which did not wish for New Mexico to retain the waters of the Gila. The enabling legislation included the phrase "Hooker Dam or a suitable alternative" to pacify conservationists who objected to the project. Acting on a report from the Carter Administration, Congress deleted funding for Hooker Dam in 1978, but left the project authorization in place. A 1982 United States Bureau of Reclamation study indicated that Hooker Dam satisfied no existing need in New Mexico, with a significant environmental impact. As a result, the dam was removed from the CAP by Reclamation. Ground water was expected to satisfy local requirements through 2010, and the dam would impact critical habitat for two species of threatened fish, the spike dace and the loach minnow.

A 2004 agreement between Arizona and New Mexico, the Arizona Water Settlements Act of 2004, limited New Mexico's consumption of Gila River water to 14,000 acre-feet (0.017 km^{3})/year, with stipulations on minimum pass-through flows, all subject to a reserve of 30,000 acre-feet (0.037 km^{3}) in Arizona's San Carlos Lake. New Mexico is to present a plan to develop its rights by 2014; none of the options presently being considered involve a major dam. Water would be diverted from the Gila through perforated pipes in an infiltration gallery, or simply pumped from the river.
