= Lake Pleasant Regional Park =

Regional county park in Arizona, US

Lake Pleasant
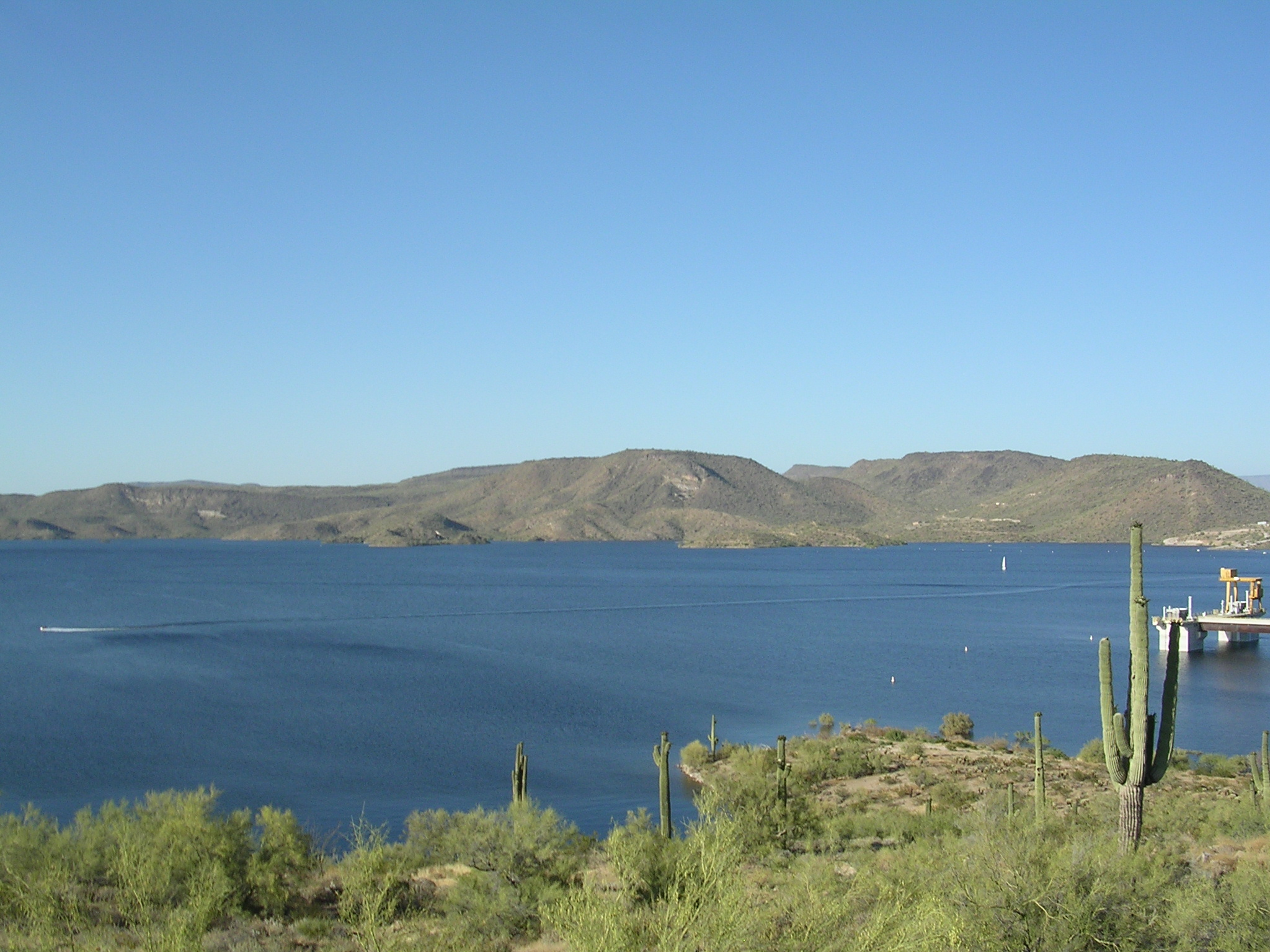

- Location within Arizona
- Location: Peoria and Morristown in Maricopa and Yavapai counties, Arizona, US
- Coordinates: 33°53′43″N 112°16′58″W
- Type: Reservoir
- Primary inflows: Agua Fria River
- Basin countries: United States
- Managing agency: Central Arizona Project
- Surface area: 7,500 acres (11.7 sq mi; 30 km^{2})
- Average depth: 70 ft (21 m)
- Max. depth: 170 ft (52 m)
- Surface elevation: 1,700 ft (520 m)

Lake Pleasant Regional Park is a large outdoors recreation area straddling the Maricopa and Yavapai county border northwest of Phoenix, Arizona. The park is located within the municipal boundaries of Peoria, Arizona, and serves as a major recreation hub for the northwest Phoenix metropolitan area. It is operated by the Maricopa County Parks and Recreation Department.

== Lake Pleasant ==
The cornerstone of the park is the 10,000-acre (16 sq mi; 40 km^{2}), Lake Pleasant, one of the important artificial reservoirs surrounding the Phoenix metropolitan area. Created by the Maricopa Water District's Carl Pleasant Dam, which was finished in 1927, and upon completion, was the largest multi-arch dam in the world. The lake originally had a surface area of 3,700 acres (5.8 sq mi; 15 km^{2}) and served as a private irrigation project. At 76 ft (23 m) high and 2,160 ft (660 m) long, the original Carl Pleasant Dam was, at its completion, the largest agricultural dam project in the world. The lake was filled by the Agua Fria River, capturing a large watershed throughout Yavapai County.

Construction of the United States Bureau of Reclamation's Central Arizona Project Aqueduct, which began in 1973, soon diverted water from the Colorado River to the lake, converting the lake from an agricultural project into a storage reservoir for the project. Completed in 1994, the New Waddell Dam tripled the surface area of the lake, submerging the old dam beneath its waters. Shortly after the completion of the dam, the area experienced a prolonged drought, and while the lake grew considerably it would not reach full capacity until early 2005. Although still fed by the Agua Fria River, the CAP aqueduct is the primary source of water for the reservoir.

Lake Pleasant is used as a major water sports recreation center for the Phoenix metro area, as well as serving as an important storage reservoir for the rapidly growing region. A number of boat docks and beach access make the lake a popular destination for scuba diving, water skiing, jet skiing, sailing, windsurfing and other water sports.

The lake has been plagued by deaths over the years, and state authorities have from time to time called for caution at Lake Pleasant because of deep water, or carbon monoxide from heavy boat traffic.

Lake Pleasant Fish Species

- Threadfin Shad
- Bluegill
- Redear Sunfish
- Green Sunfish
- Black Crappie
- White Crappie
- Largemouth Bass
- Smallmouth Bass
- White Bass
- Striped Bass
- Channel Catfish
- Flathead Catfish
- Common Carp
- Tilapia

Potential Fish Species

- Sucker
- Gizzard Shad
- Yellow Perch
- Walleye
- Northern Pike
- Muskellunge
- Rainbow Trout
- Blue Catfish
- Bullhead
- Goldfish
- Buffalo

Potential Aquarium Released Species

- Peacock Bass
- Arowana
- Cichlids
- Pacu
- Rocket Gar
- Ripsaw Catfish
- Bala Shark
- Colombian Shark
- Iridescent Shark
- Rainbow Shark
- Red Tail Shark
- Silver Apollo Shark

== Other uses ==
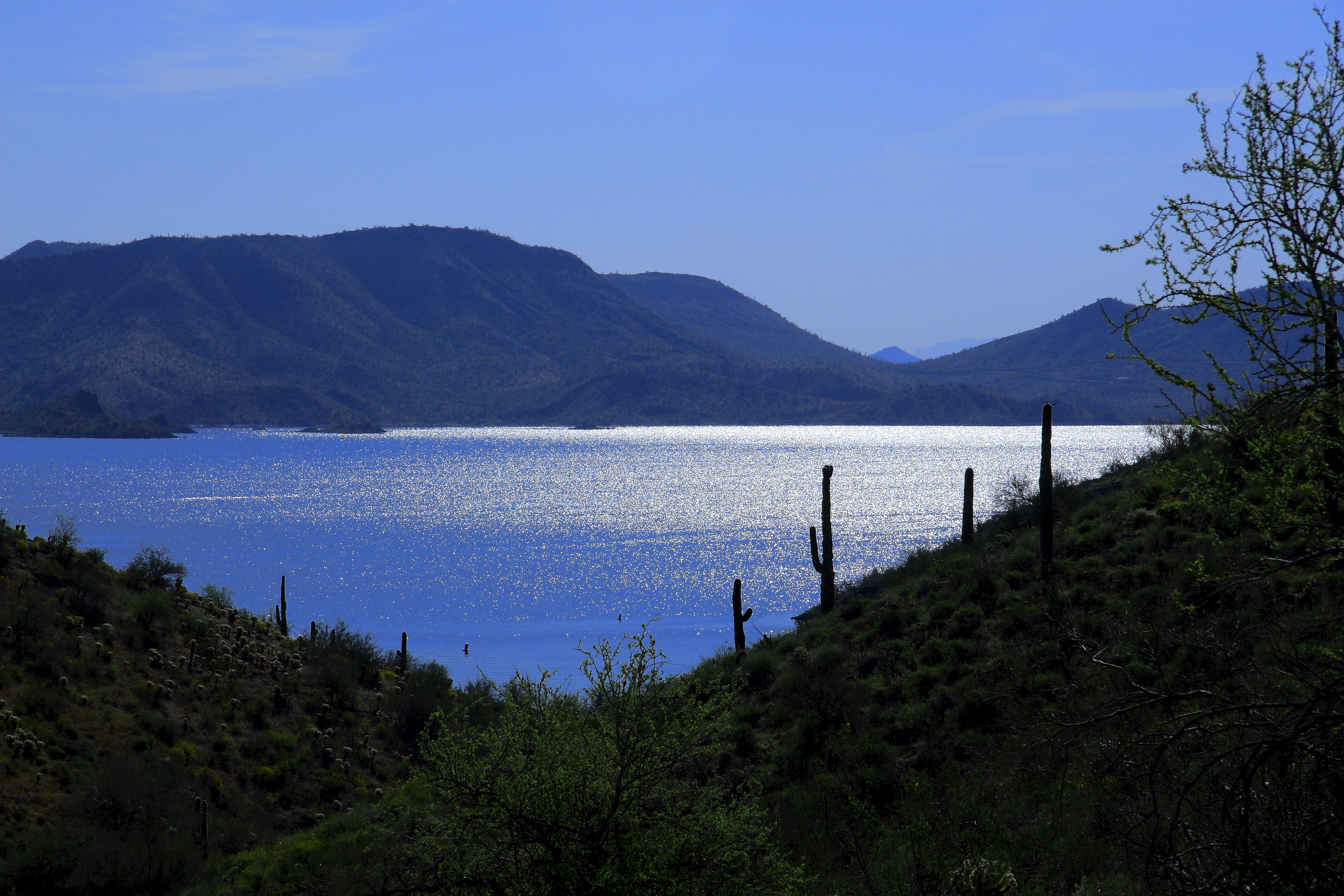
Lake Pleasant from Pipeline Canyon Trail.

The park covers a total of over 23,000 acres (93 km^{2}) of mountainous desert landscape, including the lake, and boasts a number of other recreational activities, such as mountain biking, camping, and hiking. The park also has an educational visitors' center that provides information regarding the history of the lake, the construction of the Waddell Dam and the surrounding areas.

The presence of the lake has also attracted other recreational activities in the area, such as a dirt racetrack.

The rapidly growing city of Peoria annexed the park and surrounding lands with an eye on future development, though the 2008 financial crisis brought a temporary halt to its plans. Economy aside, the increasing popularity of the area is evidenced by rapidly growing subdivisions to the south, such as Vistancia, and skyrocketing real estate values, the city has zoned much of the land in the immediate vicinity for future use of both high-end waterfront residential neighborhoods and commercial opportunities off of Lake Pleasant Parkway and the Carefree Highway.

== Annual events ==
Lake Pleasant Paddle Fest is a full day event featuring different paddle craft and fun activities.

Bill Luke Bass Days is a day and night time festival taking place at Lake Pleasant Marina featuring carnival rides, cornhole tournament, wildlife exhibits, vendors, food and live music.

== Transportation ==
The area was served by Pleasant Valley Airport, located 3 miles away. Plans to start commercial service to the airport, including from Phoenix Sky Harbor International Airport, were unsuccessful.

Several roads connect the area to Phoenix's main freeway systems. The Carefree Highway is the main road to the lake, other freeways near by connecting the lake to the rest of the Phoenix metropolitan area are the Loop 303 and I-17.

== Gallery ==
The following pictures are of some of the scenery at Lake Pleasant Regional Park and the ruins of a thousand year old Hohokam Puebloans village.

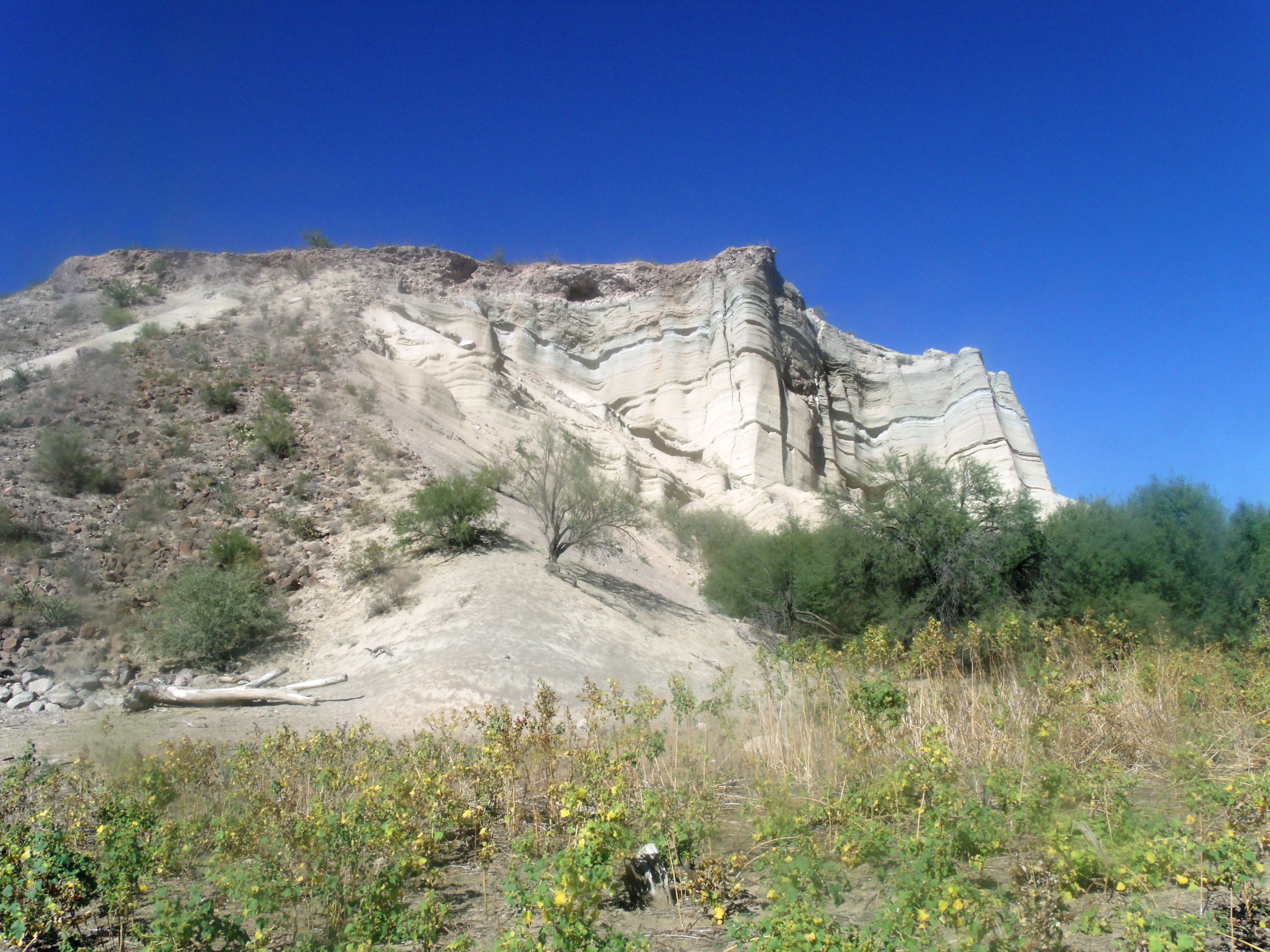
Sandstone cliffs at Lake Pleasant Regional Park.

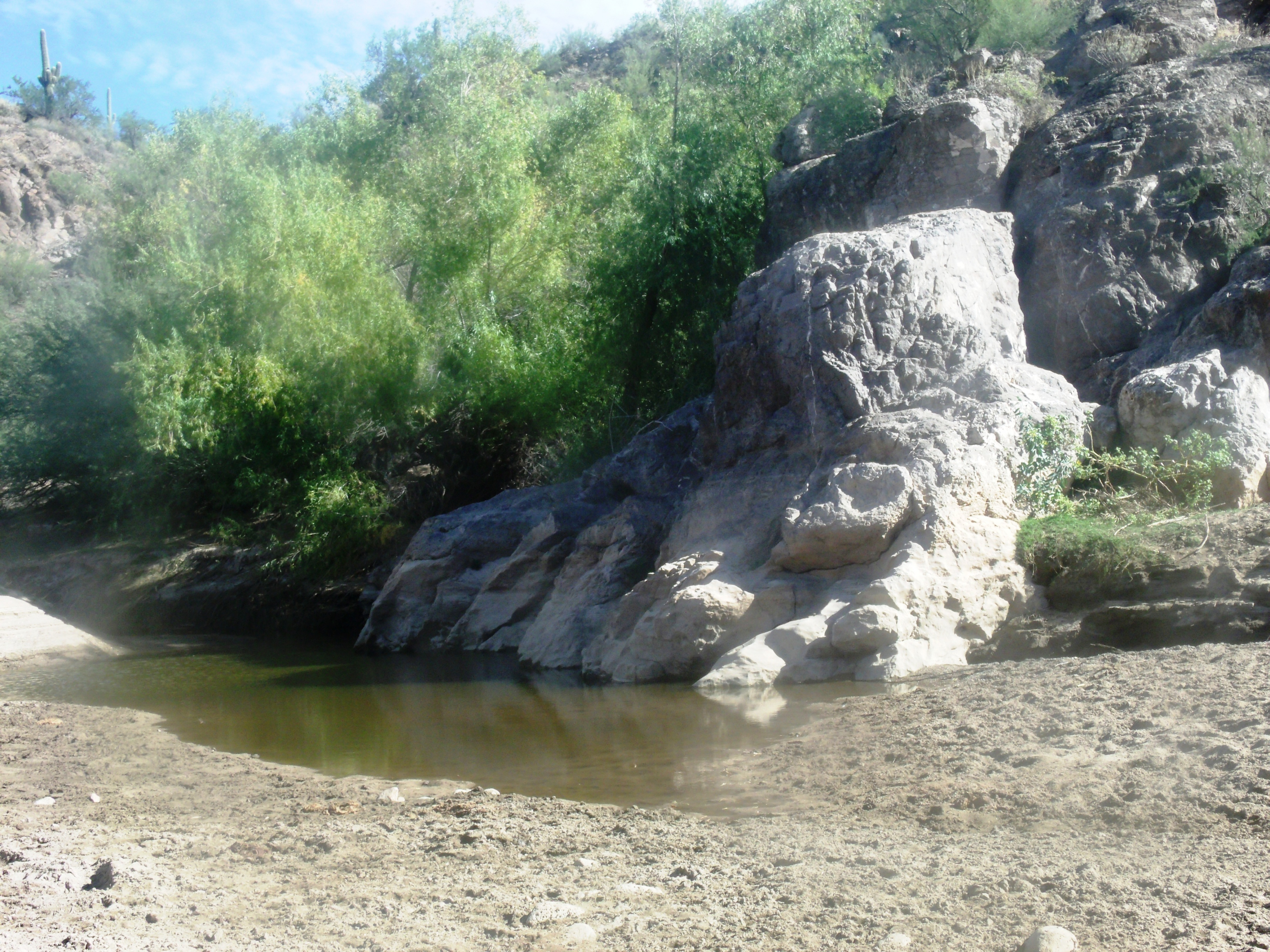
Scenery at Lake Pleasant Regional Park.

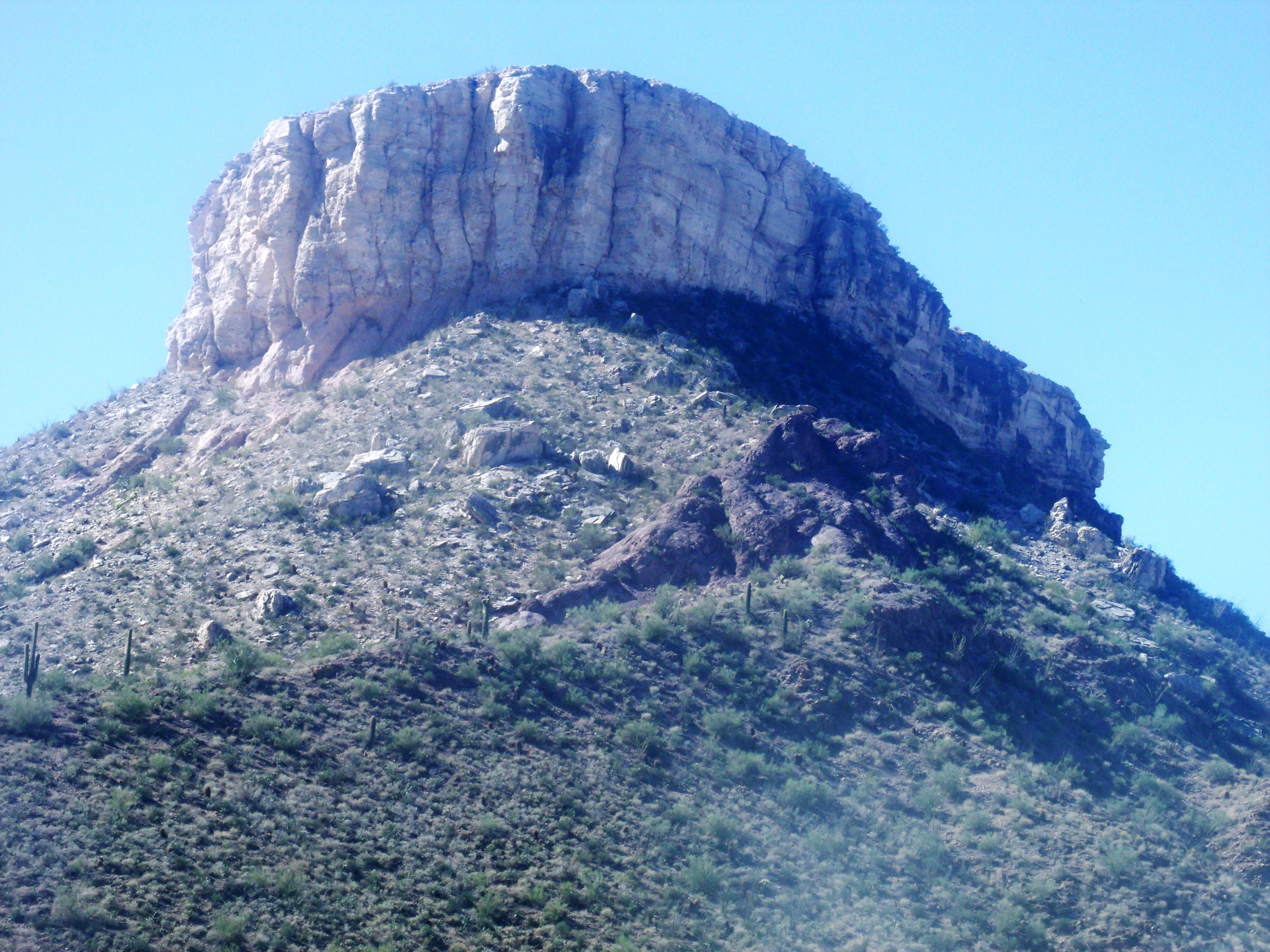
Indian Mesa at Lake Pleasant Regional Park in Arizona. On top of the Mesa are the ruins of a village built by the Hohokam Puebloans about 1000 years ago.

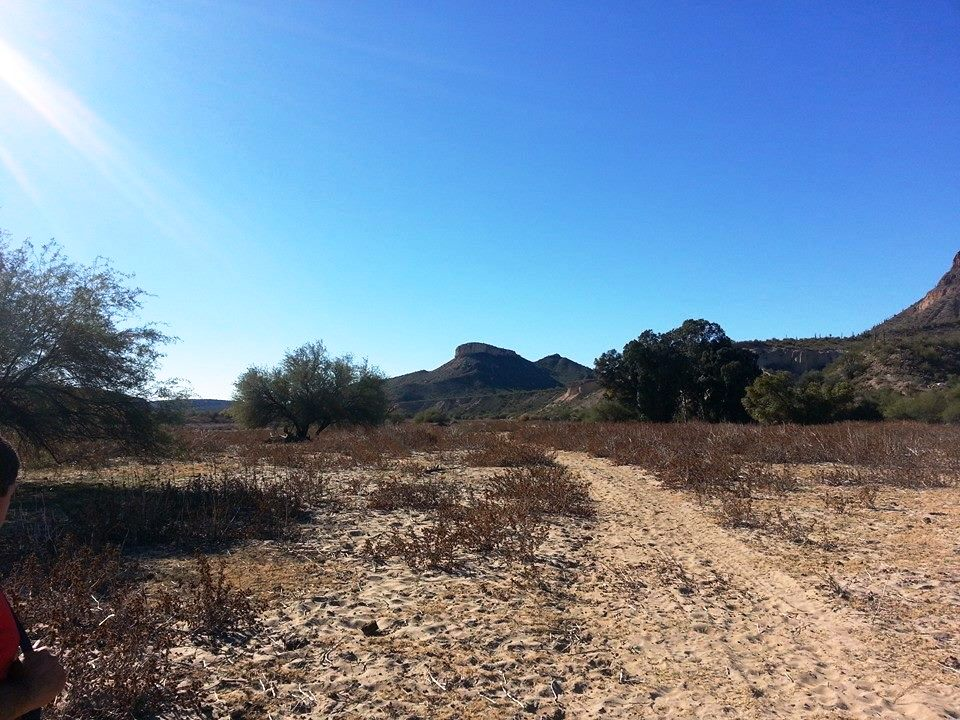
Hiking trail leading to the Indian Mesa (in the background). The hiking trail is located on a portion of a canal which the Hohokam built in 700 AD. The canal is now filled with soil.

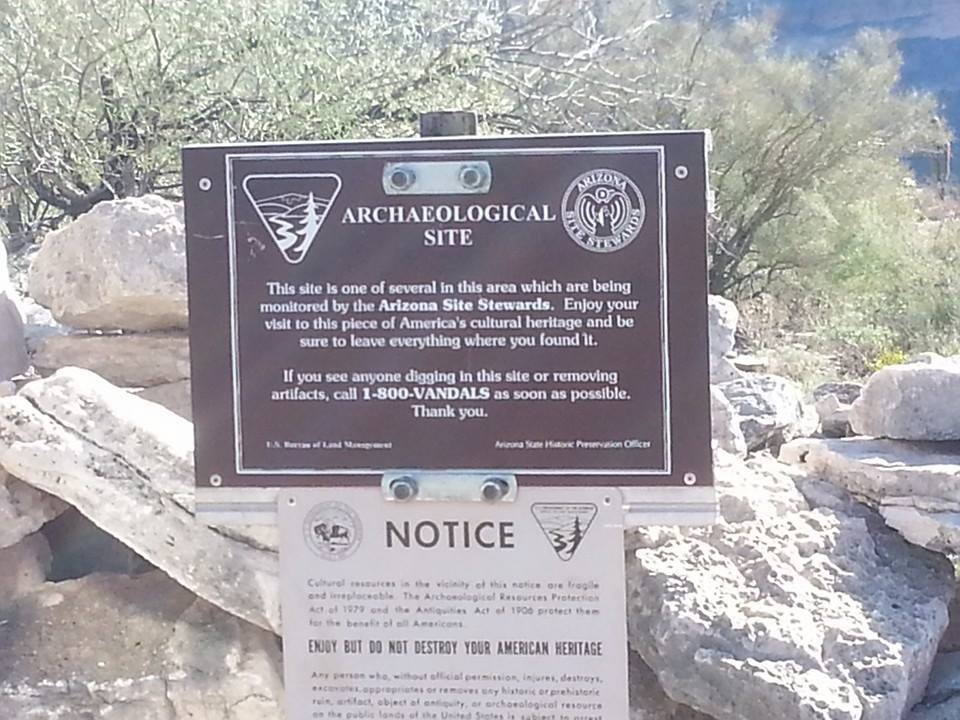
U.S. Bureau of Land Management Marker on Indian Mesa. The marker warns that removal of artifacts is strictly forbidden by Federal Law.

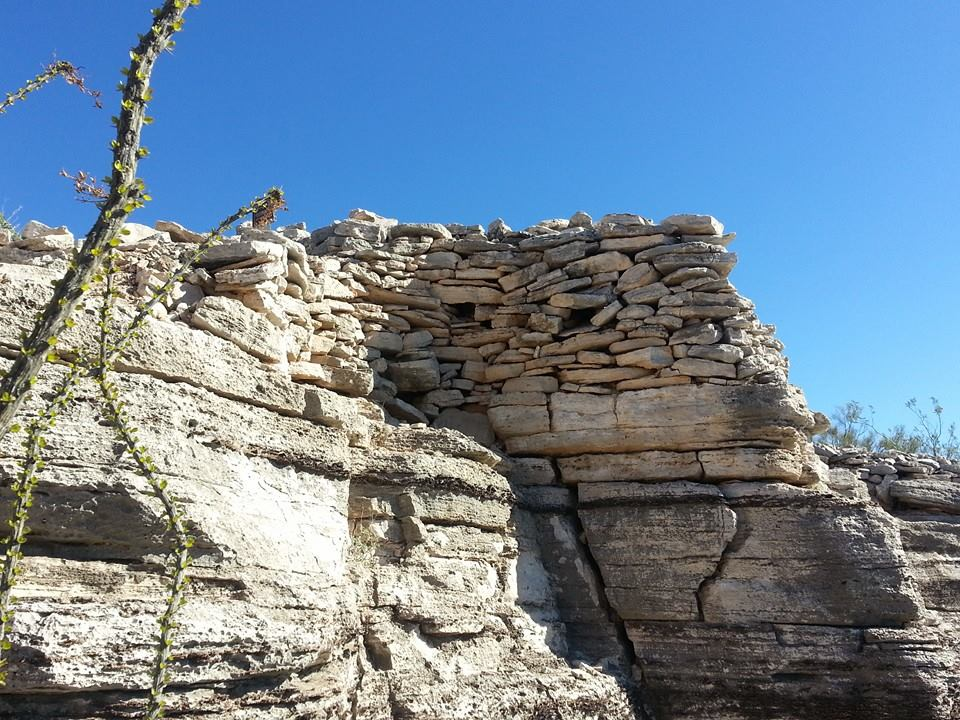
Part of the wall of the fort that surrounded the village. The holes in the wall are viewing holes so the defenders can view the only path to the top.

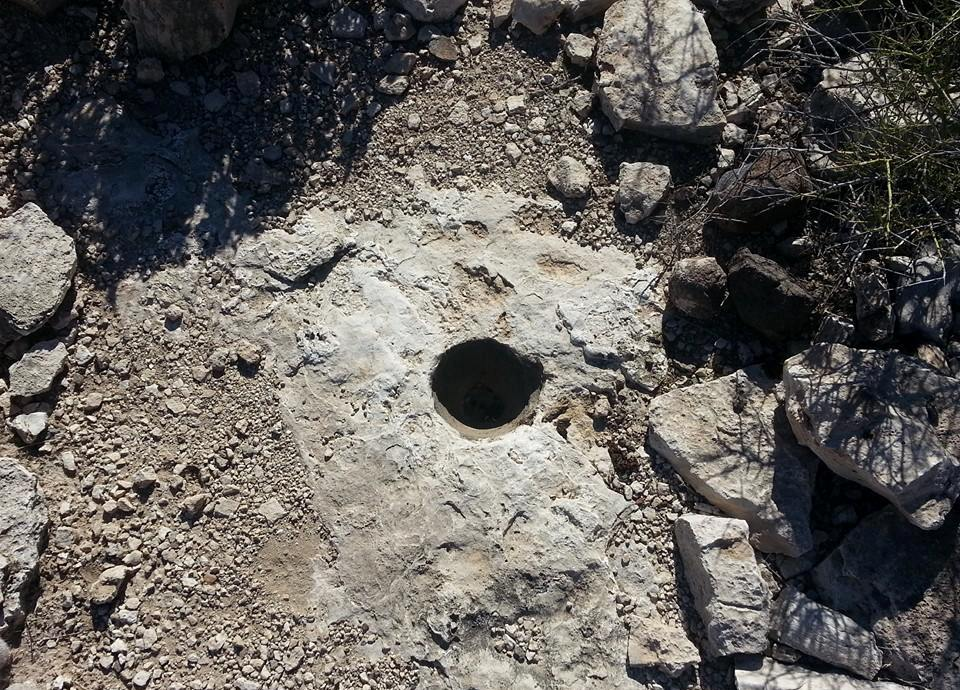
A posthole dug by the Hohokams inside their house. The Hohokams placed heavy mesquite or pine posts in them to support a roof.

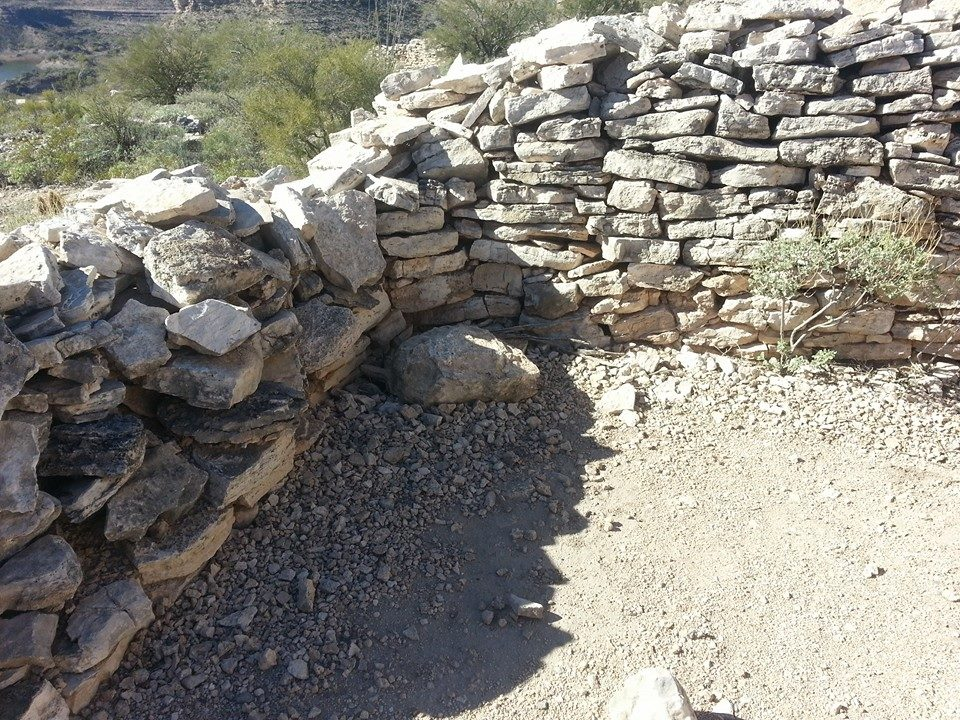
Different view of the ruins of a Hohokam house.

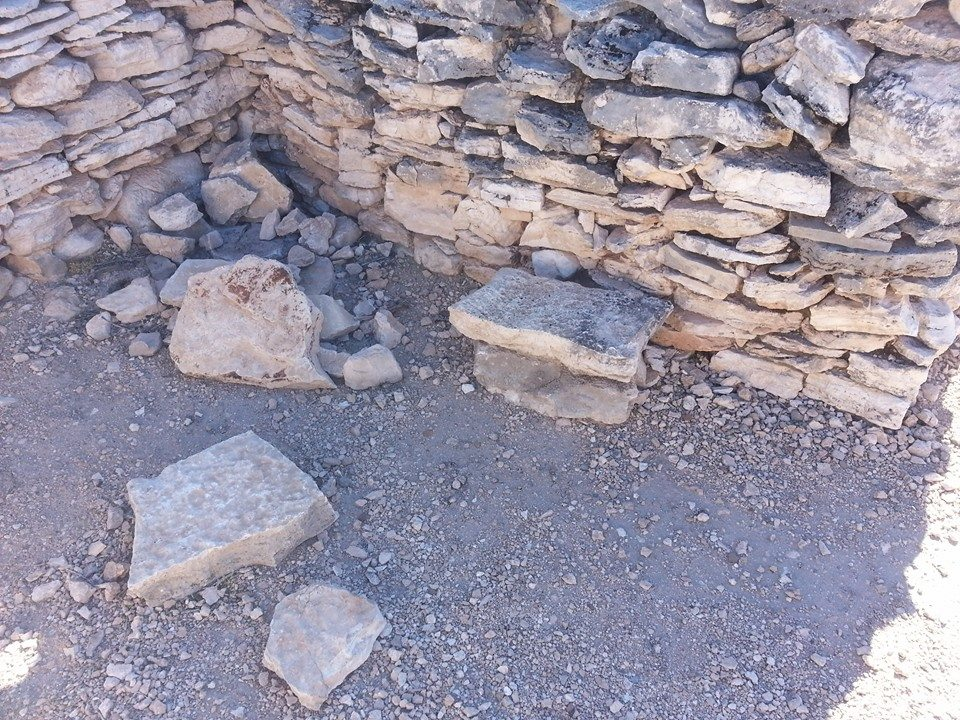
Another view of the ruins of a Hohokam house.

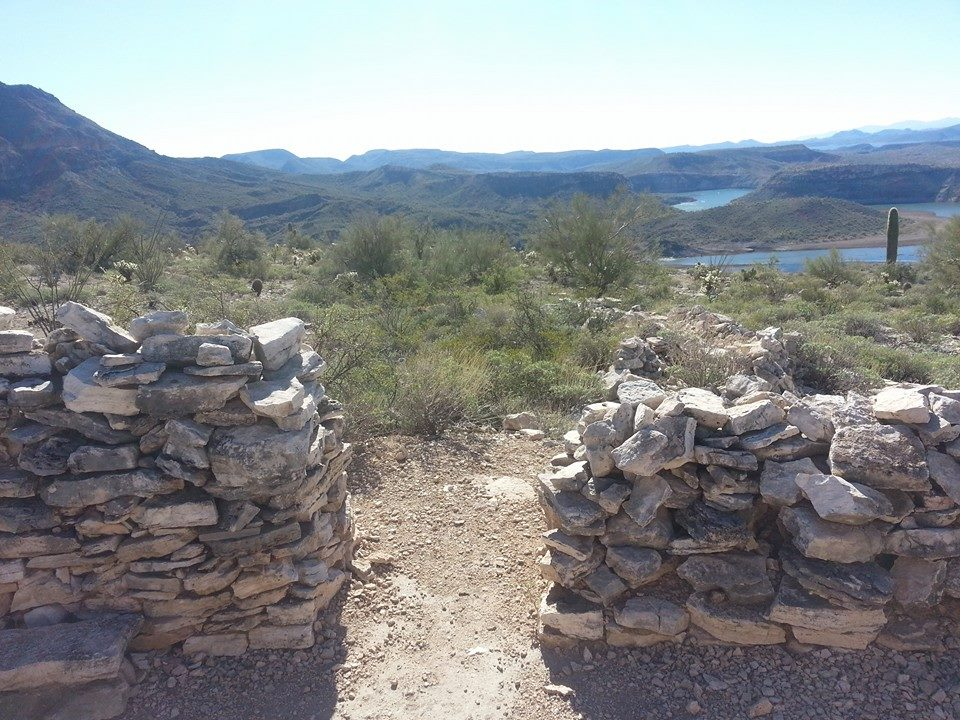
Entrance to a Hohokam home. Lake Pleasant is in the background.

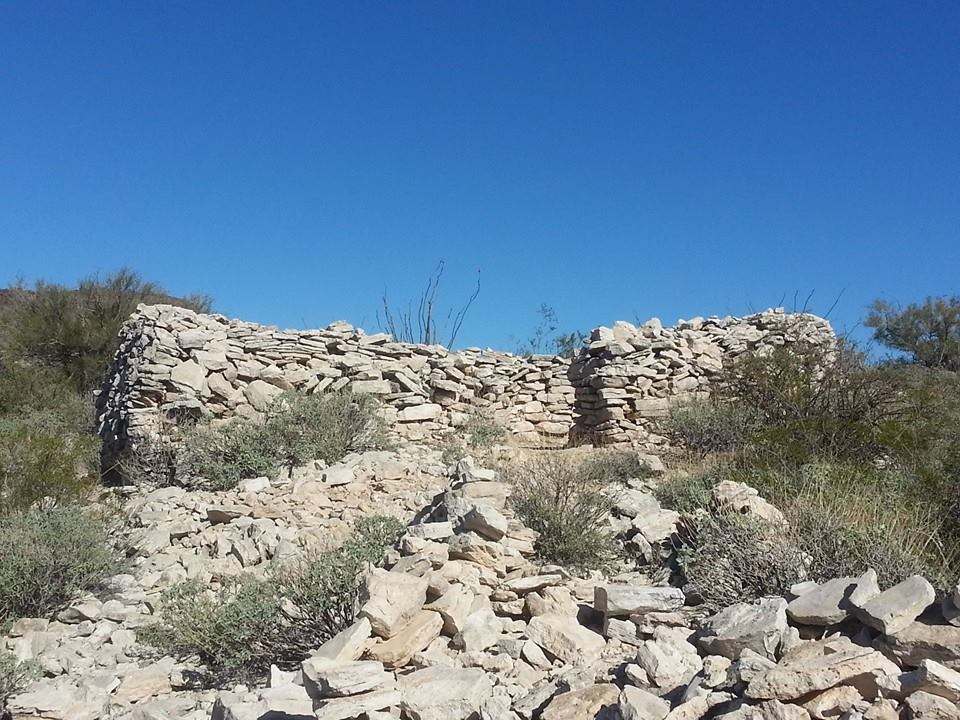
Rocky trail leading to the entrance of a Hohokam house.

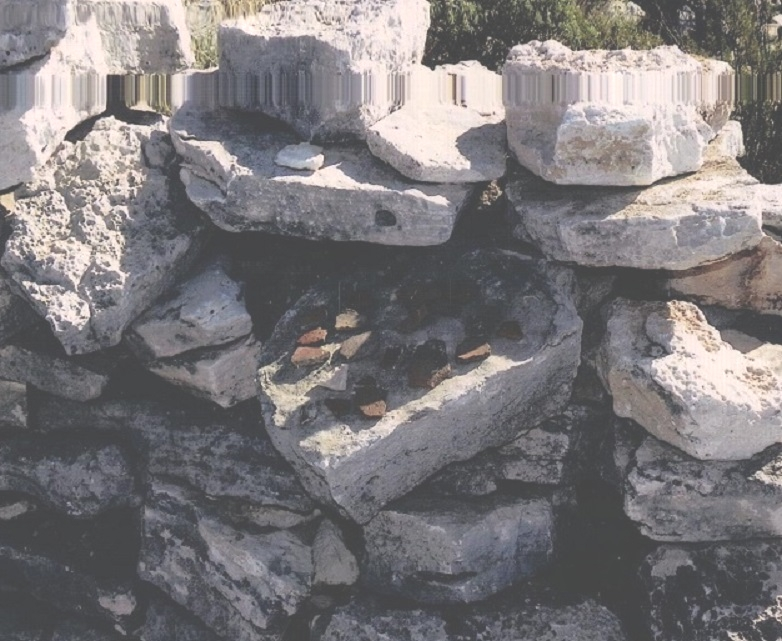
Ancient Hohokam pottery pieces (small brown ones) found at Indian Mesa.

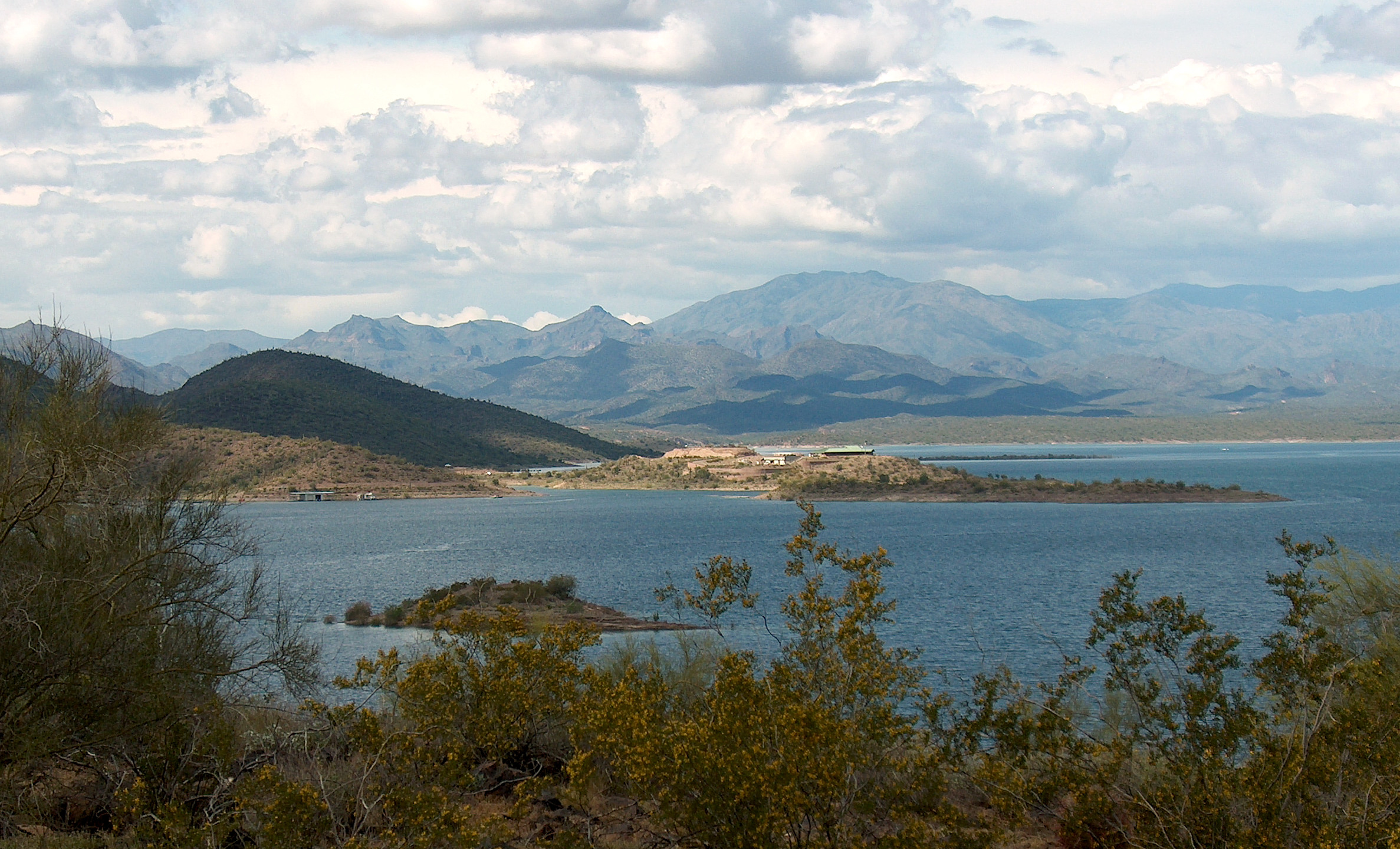
Lake Pleasant – north view with Bradshaw Mountains in background

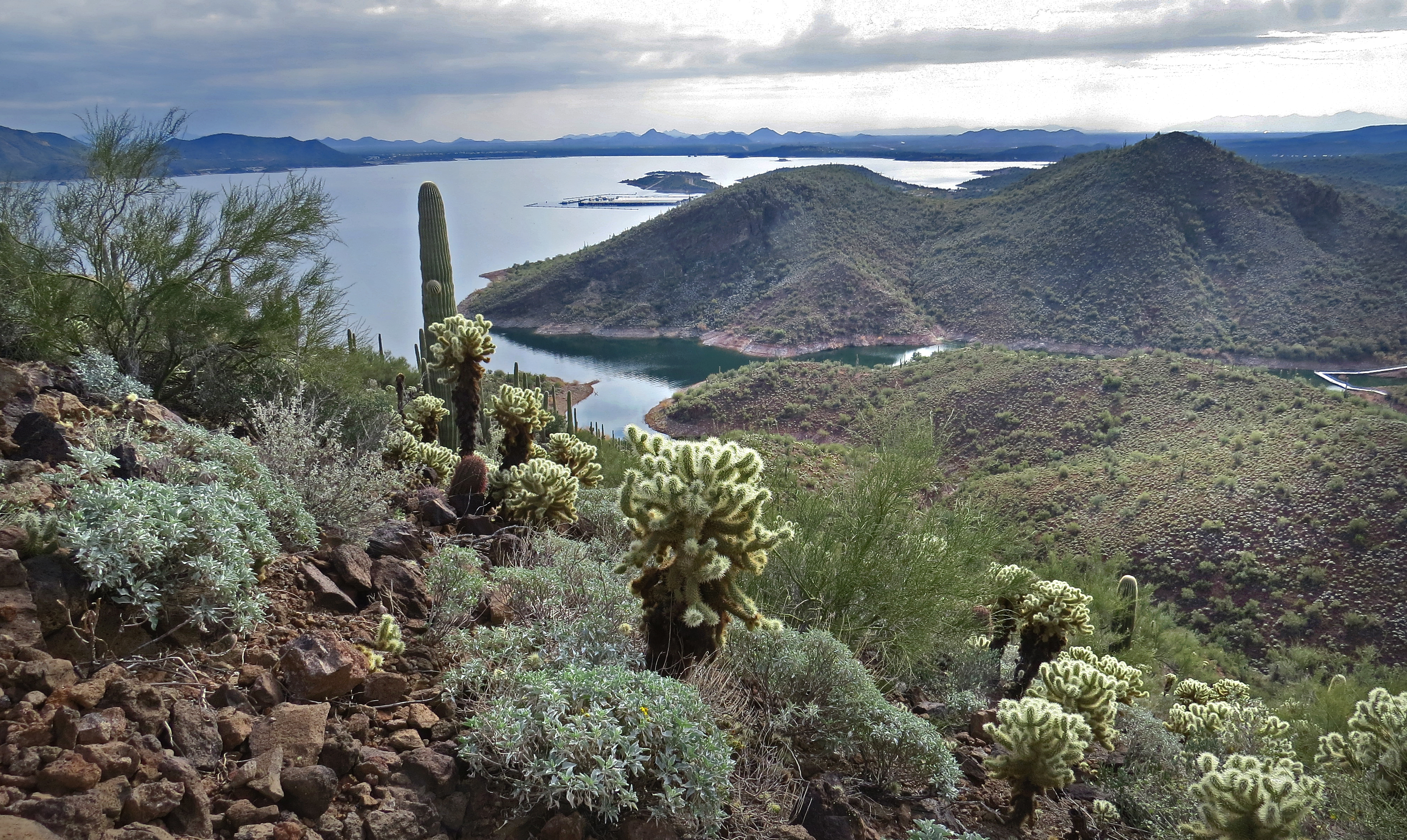
Lake Pleasant – south view in general direction of Phoenix

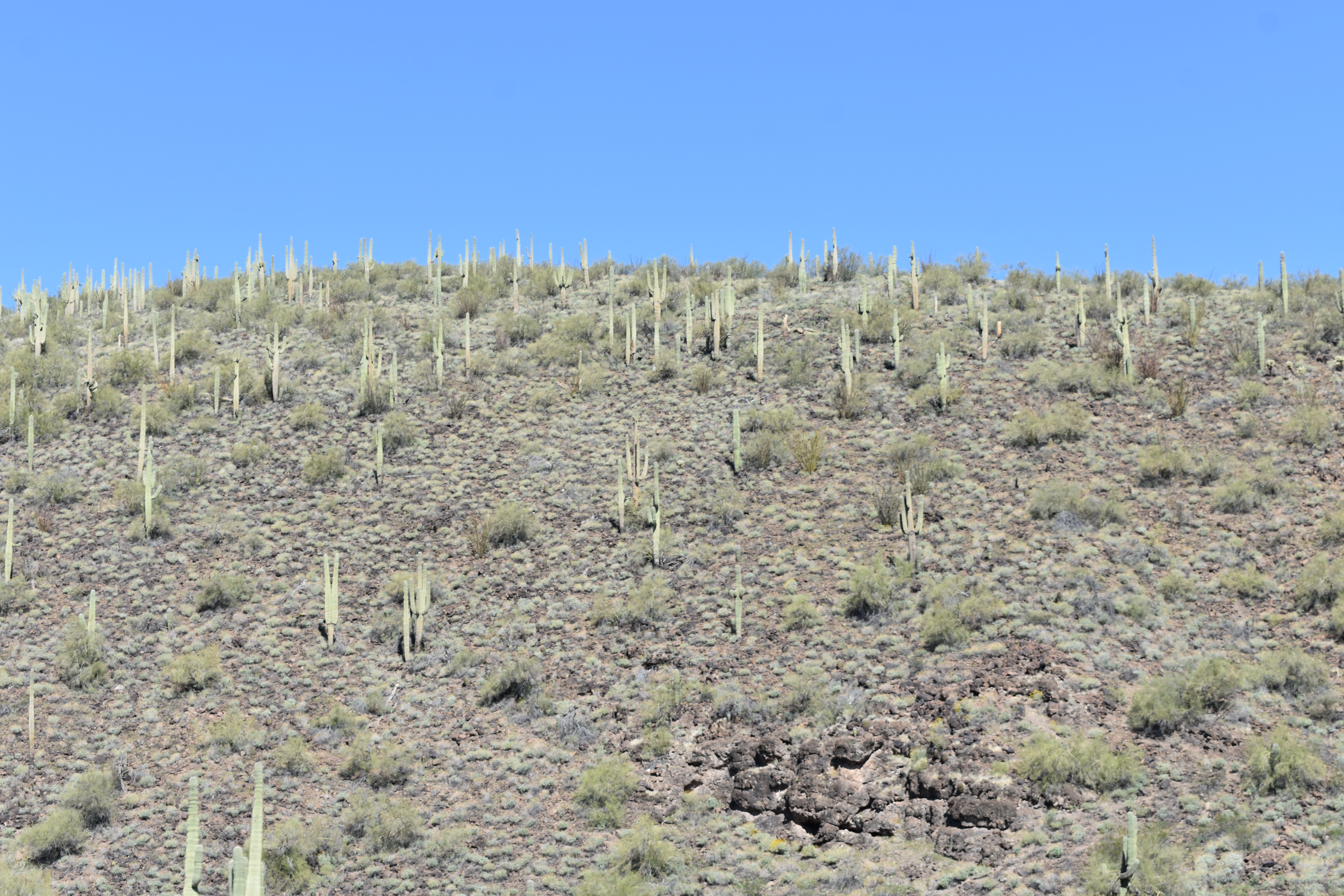
Cacti "forests" leading in to Lake Pleasant Regional Park

== See also ==
- Bradshaw Mountains
- Castle Hot Springs (Arizona)
- Hells Canyon Wilderness (Arizona)
- Hieroglyphic Mountains
- Indian Mesa
- Lake Pleasant Camp
- Maricopa Trail
