= Pleasant Lake Township, Benson County, North Dakota =

Civil township in North Dakota, U.S.

Coordinates: 48°20′00″N 99°47′31″W

Pleasant Lake Township is a civil township in Benson County, North Dakota, United States. As of the 2000 census, its population was 80. The unincorporated community of Pleasant Lake, North Dakota is located in the township. The Pleasant Lake National Wildlife Refuge also is within the township.
