= Pleasant Lake station =

Pleasant Lake station could refer to:

- Pleasant Lake station (Indiana), a disused train station in Pleasant Lake, Indiana
- Pleasant Lake station (Massachusetts), a former train station in Harwich, Massachusetts
