= Pleasant Lake, North Dakota =

- Unincorporated community
- Location within the state of North Dakota
- Coordinates: 48°21′41″N 99°48′07″W
- Country: United States
- State: North Dakota
- County: Benson
- Elevation: 1,601 ft (488 m)
- Time zone: UTC-7 (Mountain (MST))
  - Summer (DST): UTC-6 (MDT)
- Area code: 701
- GNIS feature ID: 1030746

Pleasant Lake is an unincorporated community in Benson County, North Dakota, United States. There had been a railroad station here named Pleasant Lake on the Great Northern Railway line. It is within the Pleasant Lake Township.

The nearby lake is named Broken Bone Lake, after bison bones broken to extract bone marrow to make pemmican. This lake is the location of the Pleasant Lake National Wildlife Refuge within the township.

== Transportation ==
Amtrak’s Empire Builder, which operates between Seattle/Portland and Chicago, passes through the town on BNSF tracks, but makes no stop. The nearest station is located in Rugby, 9 miles (14 km) to the west.
