= Pump as turbine =

Type of reaction water turbine

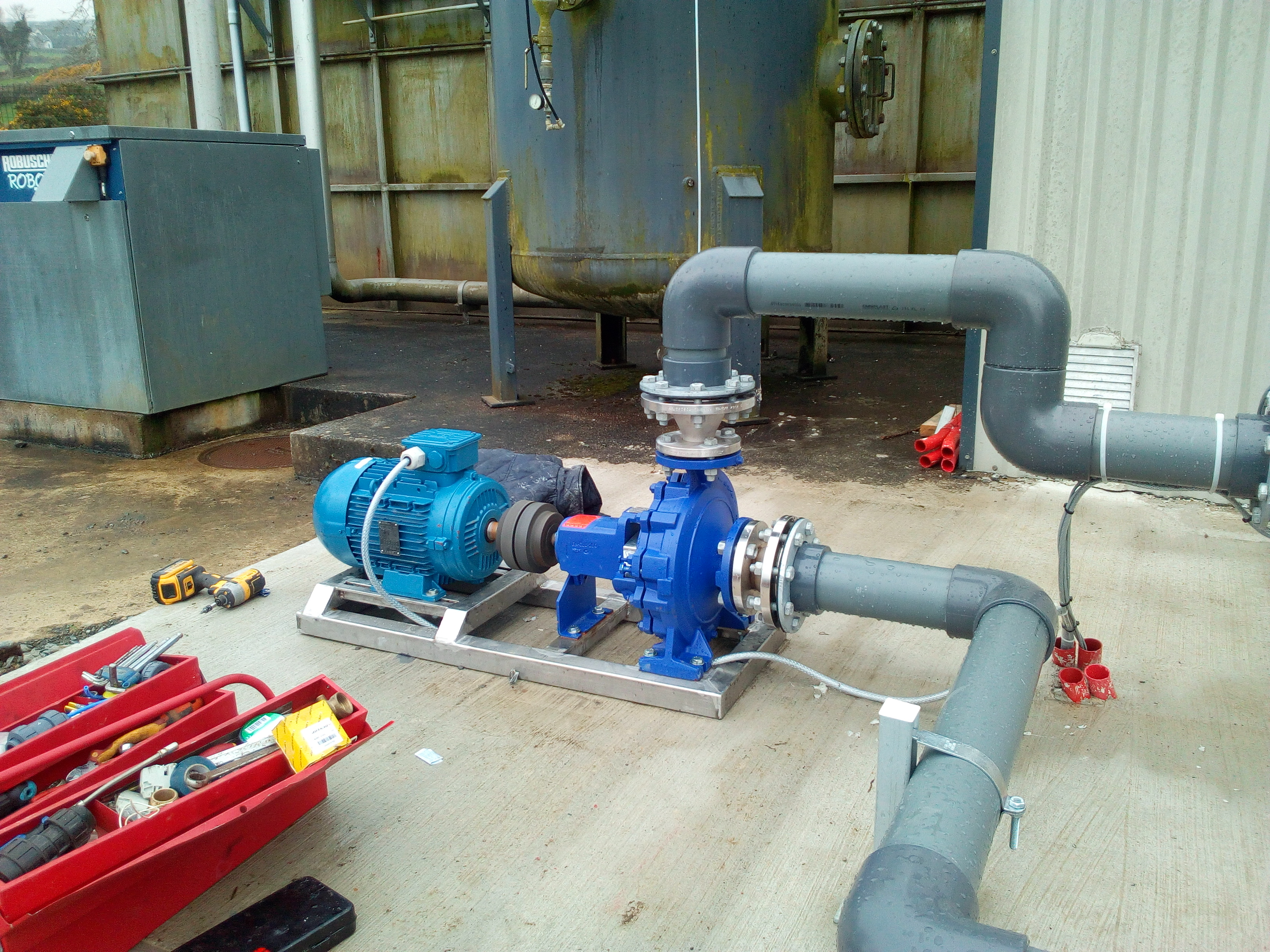
Pump as turbine installed to recover energy within the premises of an Irish rural water network in 2019

A pump as turbine (PAT), also known as a pump in reverse, is an unconventional type of reaction water turbine, which behaves in a similar manner to that of a Francis turbine. The function of a PAT is comparable to that of any turbine, to convert kinetic and pressure energy of the fluid into mechanical energy of the runner. They are commonly commercialized as composite pump and motor/generator units, coupled by a fixed shaft to an asynchronous induction type motor unit.

Unlike other conventional machines which require being manufactured according to the client’s specifications, pumps are a very common piece of equipment widely available in different sizes and functionality anywhere around the globe. When used as a turbine, the rotor moves in the opposite direction, or in reverse, as to when it is operating as a pump. In this manner, it allows the motor to generate electrical power.

== History ==
First mentions of the possibility of using pumps as turbines (PAT) dates back to the early 1930s and are associated to lab experiments performed by Thoma and Kittredge, who first identified the potential for a common pump to function quite efficiently as a turbine by reversing the flow.

Subsequently, in the second half of the 20th century, a new impulse for research on this topic came from the pump manufacturing industry. During this time, established collaborations with several research institutes helped develop an in-depth understanding of the phenomena associated with PAT utilization. Efforts were made to develop methods to predict characteristic and efficiency curves. This helped determine the Best Efficiency Point (BEP) of these machines, in turbine mode, and related it to its specifications when used as a pump.

The adoption of PATs has the potential to turn economically feasible even hydropower potentials in the "pico" scale (i.e. less than 5 kW of installed capacity), since they only cost a fraction of a conventional hydro turbine. Recent examples of such schemes are two pilot plants built in 2019 in Ireland and Wales.

== Pumped-storage hydroelectricity ==
In micro Pumped-storage hydroelectricity (PSH), the same pump/PAT could be used for pumping and generating phases by changing rotational direction and speed. The best efficiency point in pumping usually differs from its reverse mode: a variable-frequency drive coupled to the motor/generator would be needed in order to change from pumping to generating mode and to react efficiently to the PSH load fluctuation.

== Types ==
Among the existing designs of hydraulic pumps/PATs, "centrifugal" or "radial" units are the most used worldwide in a wide variety of application fields. The name is derived from the radial path followed by the fluid in the rotor: from the centre to the periphery when running as a pump and in the opposite direction when flow is reversed. To achieve a higher head drop across the machine, more impellers can be assembled in series to create a multistage unit. Conversely, a double flow radially split pump/PAT design involves a single radial open rotor fed by two symmetric inlets and enable processing a higher flow rate with respect to a standard radial unit. A second type of pump/PAT design is the axial one, in which the fluid interacts with a propeller following a trajectory parallel to the pump axis. Such units are particularly suitable to processing high flow rates with low head difference. Finally, mixed flow pumps/PATs stand in between the applicability range of radial and axial units and have an impeller shaped in a similar way as a Francis turbine. Another special pump/PAT design is that of submersible units, which can possibly be fitted inside a pipe connected to draft tube exploiting small head differences in flowing rivers.
