= Stewart Mountain Dam =

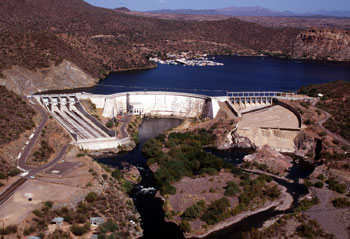
- Stewart Mountain Dam
- Interactive map of Stewart Mountain Dam
- Country: United States of America
- Location: Maricopa County, Arizona
- Coordinates: 33°34′00″N 111°32′08″W
- Status: Operational
- Construction began: 1928
- Opening date: 1930
- Owner: United States Bureau of Reclamation
- Operator: Salt River Project

Dam and spillways
- Type of dam: Arch dam
- Impounds: Salt River
- Height: 207 feet (63 m)
- Length: 1,260 feet (380 m)
- Elevation at crest: 1,533 feet (467 m)
- Width (crest): 8 feet (2.4 m)
- Width (base): 33 feet (10 m)
- Dam volume: 120,000 cubic yards (92,000 m^{3})

Reservoir
- Total capacity: 73,613 acre-feet (90,800,000 m^{3})
- Catchment area: 6,330 square miles (16,400 km^{2})
- Surface area: 1,260 acres (510 ha)

Power Station
- Operator: Salt River Project
- Type: Conventional
- Hydraulic head: 116 feet (35 m)
- Installed capacity: 13 MW

The Stewart Mountain Dam is a concrete thin arch dam located 41 miles northeast of Phoenix, Arizona. The dam is 1,260 feet (380 m) long, 207 feet (63 m) high, and was built between 1928 and 1930. The dam includes a 13,000 kilowatt (kW) hydroelectric generating unit that is operated by SRP (Salt River Project), an Arizona public utility. It is primarily operated during the summer months. The dam forms Saguaro Lake as it slows the passage of the Salt River in Maricopa County, Arizona. It was named after a ranch that used to be located nearby known as the Old Stewart Ranch.

A camp was built just below the dam in 1927 to house the construction workers; after the damn's completion it was turned into the Saguaro Lake Guest Ranch.

The dam was listed on the National Register of Historic Places in 2017.

== Gallery ==
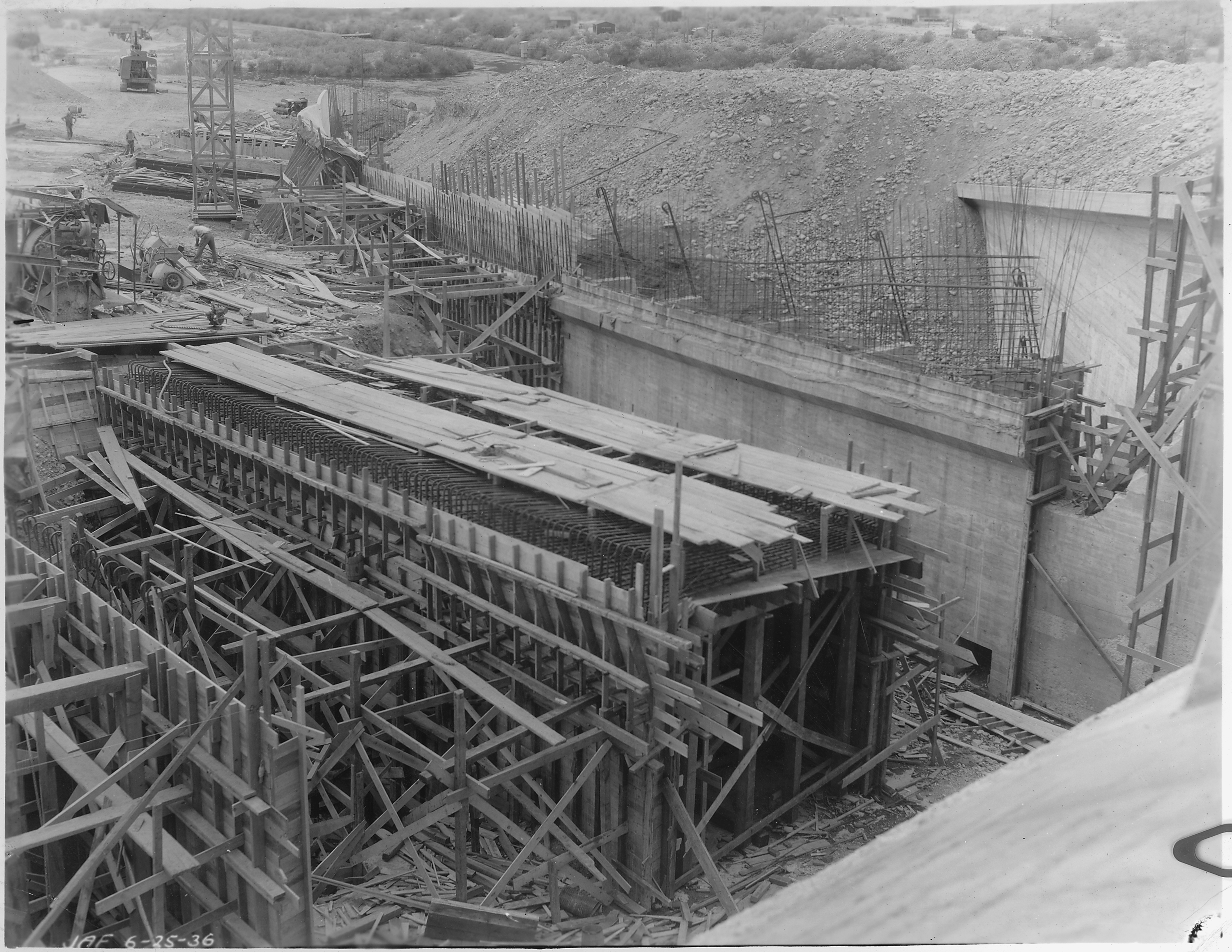
25 June 1936

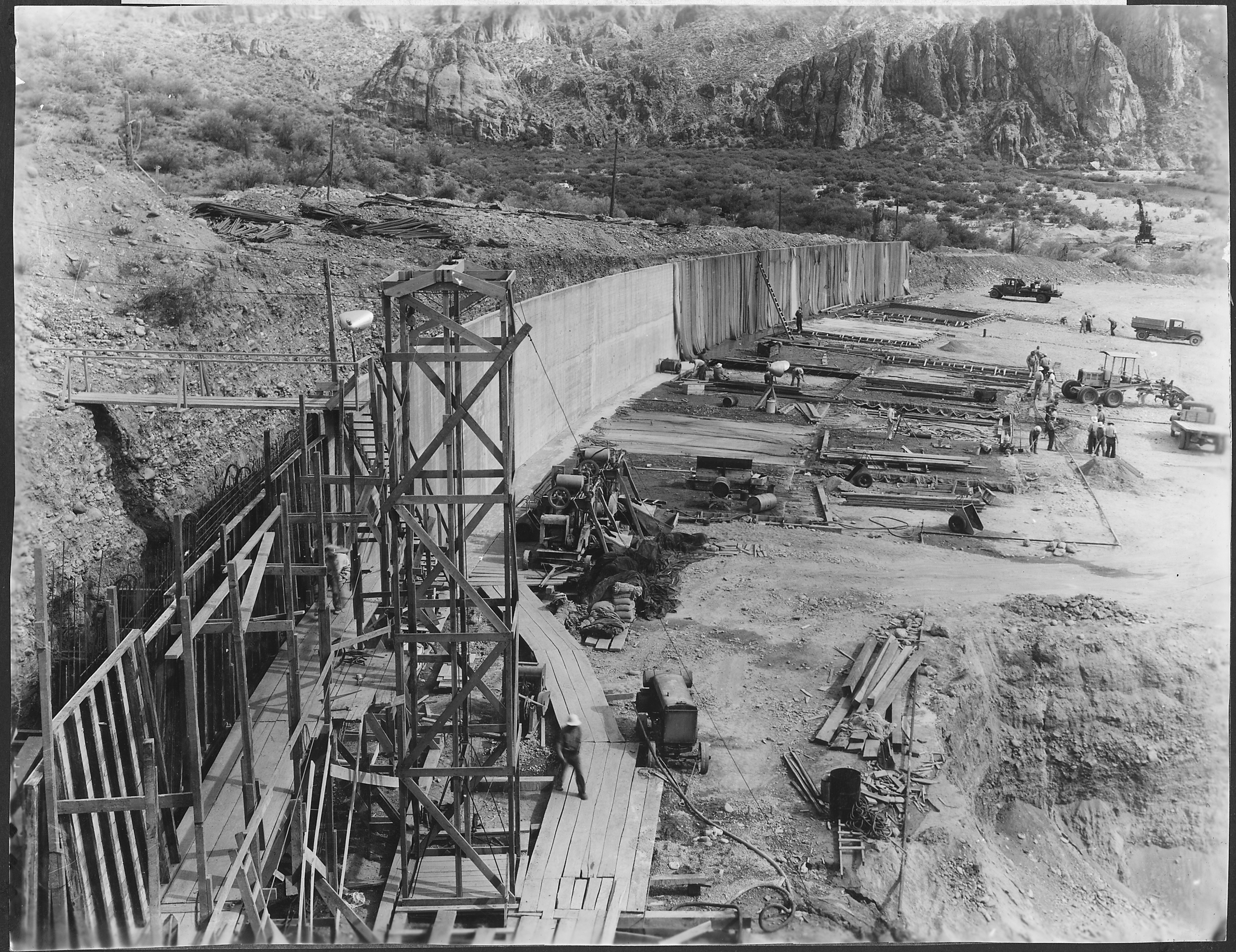

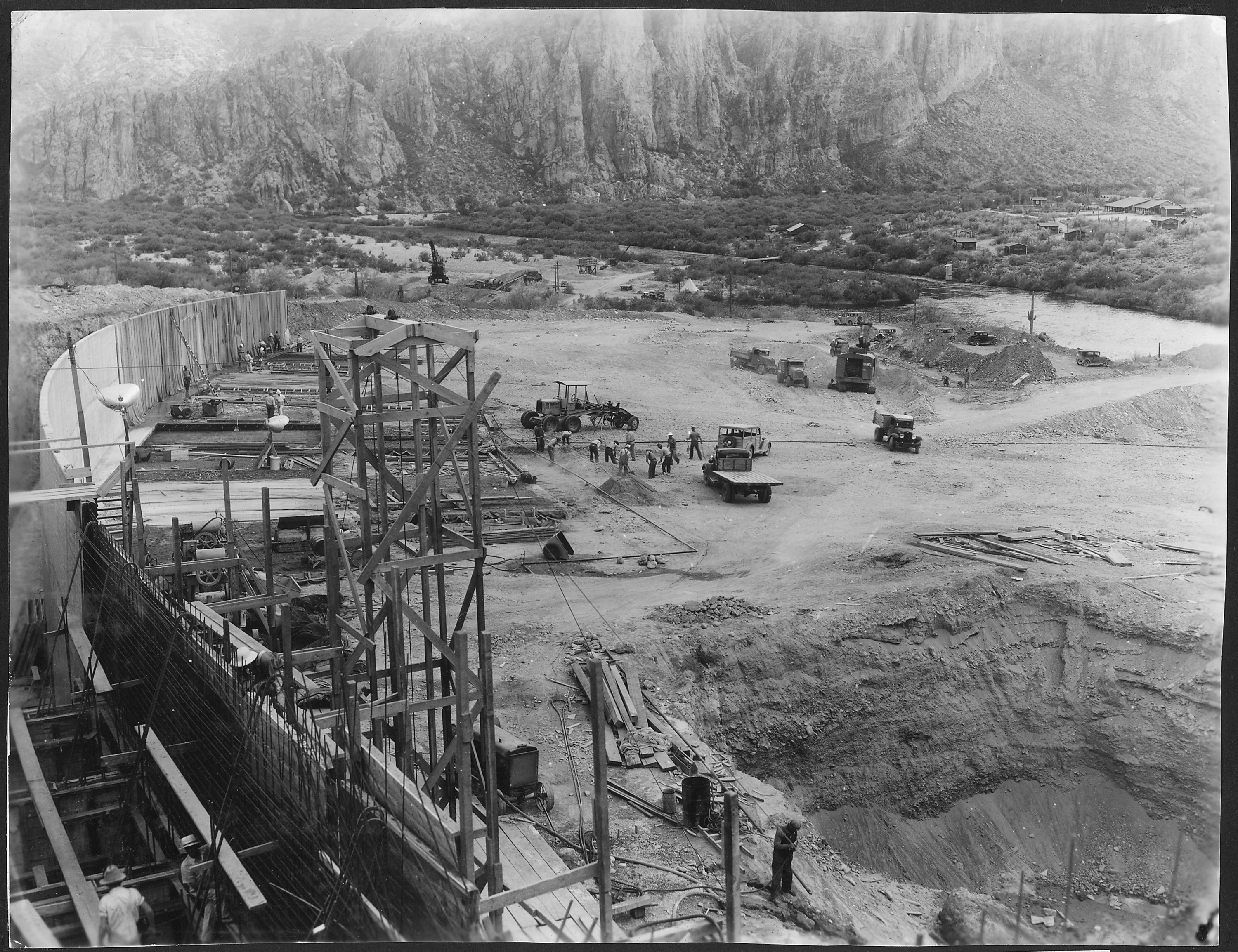

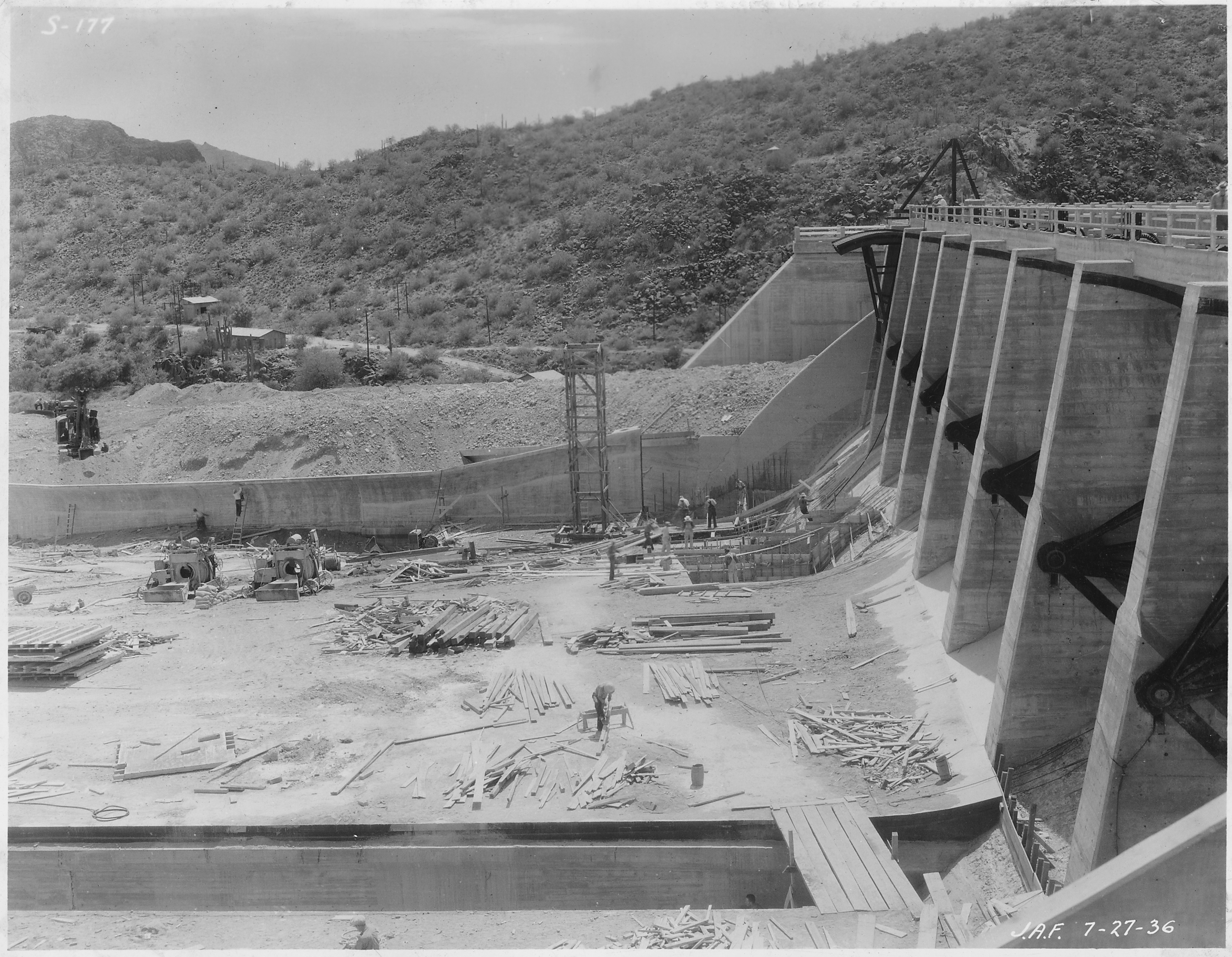
