= Central Arizona Project =

Colorado river aqueduct supplying metro Phoenix and Tucson

- Coordinates: 34°18′N 114°06′W
- Begins: Lake Havasu, La Paz County
- Ends: Pima Mine Road, Pima County
- Owner: United States Bureau of Reclamation
- Maintained by: Central Arizona Water Conservation District

Characteristics
- Total length: 336 mi (541 km)
- Capacity: 456 billion U.S. gallons (1.73 billion cubic meters; 1.4 million acre-feet) per year

History
- Construction start: 1973
- Opened: 1993

Location
- Interactive map of Central Arizona Project

The Central Arizona Project (CAP) is a 336 mi (541 km) diversion canal in Arizona in the Western United States.

The aqueduct diverts water from the Colorado River at the Bill Williams Wildlife Refuge south portion of Lake Havasu near Parker into central and southern Arizona. CAP is managed and operated by the Central Arizona Water Conservation District (CAWCD). It was shepherded through Congress by Carl Hayden.

== Description ==
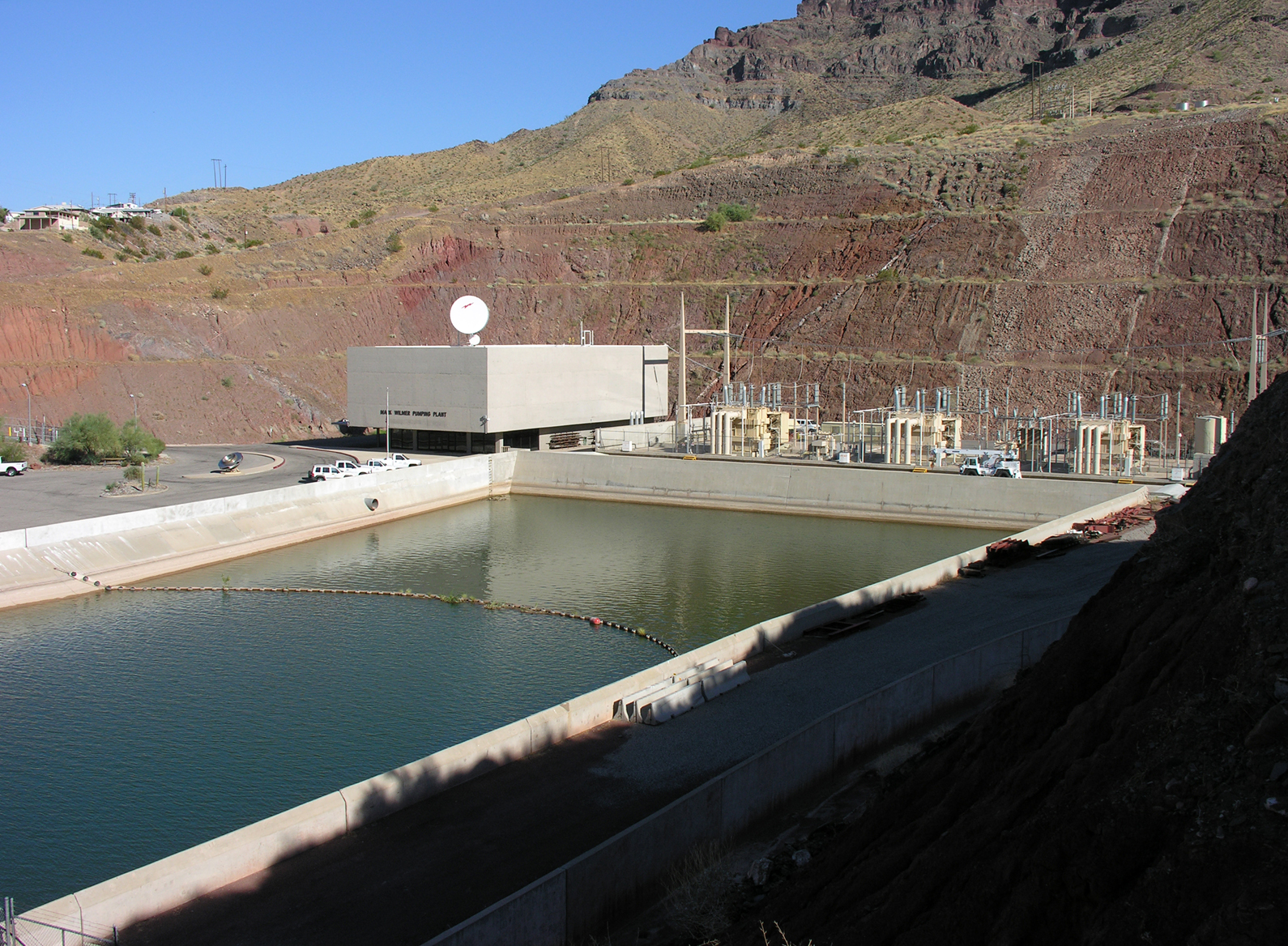
The Mark Wilmer Pumping Plant

The CAP delivers Colorado River water, either directly or by exchange, into central and Southern Arizona. The project was envisioned to provide water to nearly one million acres (405,000 hectares) of irrigated agricultural land areas in Maricopa, Pinal, and Pima counties, as well as municipal water for several Arizona communities, including the metropolitan areas of Phoenix and Tucson. Authorization also was included for development of facilities to deliver water to Catron, Hidalgo, and Grant counties in New Mexico, but these facilities have not been constructed because of cost considerations, a lack of demand for the water, lack of repayment capability by the users, and environmental constraints.

In addition to its water supply benefits, the project also provides substantial benefits from flood control, outdoor recreation, fish and wildlife conservation, and sediment control. It also produces an unintended swale, further increasing local biodiversity. In order to address groundwater collapse, and in exchange for funding the project, the federal government required the state to restrict groundwater withdrawals, and to recharge depleted aquifers using CAP water.

The project was subdivided, for administration and construction purposes, into the Granite Reef, Orme, Salt-Gila, Gila River, Tucson, Indian Distribution, and Colorado River divisions. During project construction, the Orme Division was reformulated and renamed the Regulatory Storage Division. Upon completion, the Granite Reef Division was renamed the Hayden-Rhodes Aqueduct, and the Salt-Gila Division was renamed the Fannin-McFarland Aqueduct. The Hayden-Rhodes Aqueduct, which carries water from Lake Havasu to the Phoenix area, includes three tunnels totaling 8.2 miles.

The 456 billion U.S. gallons (1.73 billion cubic meters; 1.4 million acre-feet) of water is lifted by up to 2,900 feet (880 m) by 14 pumping plants using 2.5 million MWh of electricity each year [285 MW], making CAP the largest power user in Arizona. Lake Pleasant is used as a buffer.

The canal loses approximately 16,000 acre-feet (5.2 billion U.S. gallons; 20 million cubic meters) of water each year to evaporation, and a further 9,000 acre-feet (2.9 billion U.S. gallons; 11 million cubic meters) annually from water seeping or leaking through the concrete.

== History ==
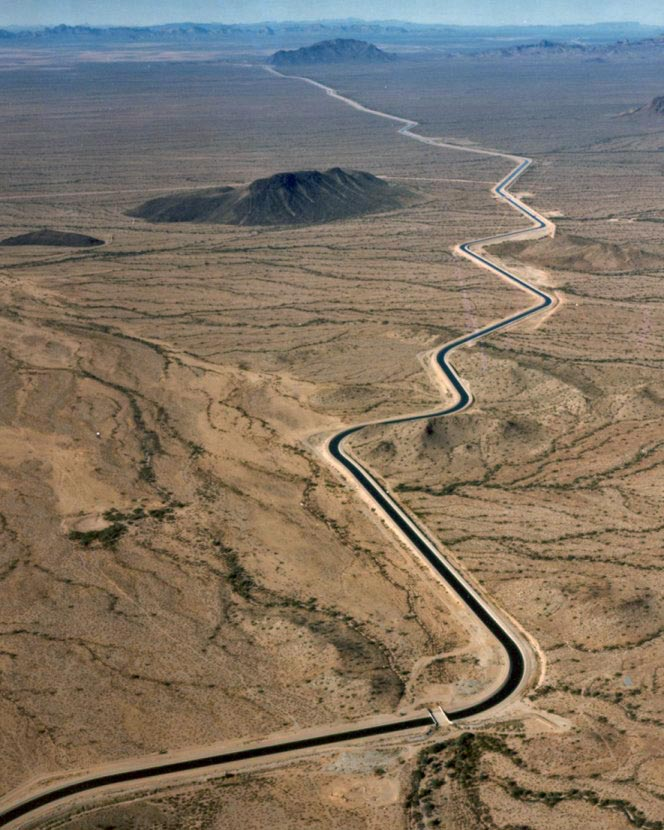
An aerial photo of the Central Arizona Project

The CAP was motivated by the lack of sufficient groundwater for Arizona's consumption and growth in a desert environment. By the mid-20th century, the state pumped 500 times as much water as rain could replace, and aquifers were collapsing. The CAP allowed agriculture to develop in the state, which can be very fertile given sufficient water.

The CAP was created by the Colorado River Basin Project Act of 1968, signed by US President Lyndon B. Johnson on September 30, 1968. Senator Ernest McFarland, along with Senator Carl Hayden, lobbied for the Central Arizona Project (CAP) aimed at providing Arizona's share of the Colorado River to the state. McFarland's efforts failed as senator; however, they laid a critical foundation for the eventual passage of the CAP in the late 1960s.

According to the Arizona Republic, Senator Barry Goldwater, Senator Hayden, Representative Morris Udall, US Secretary of the Interior Stewart Udall and other Arizona leaders teamed up on the successful passage of what was McFarland's intended legislation that became the CAP, "probably the state's most celebrated bipartisan achievement of the 20th century." This act provided for the US Secretary of the Interior to enter into an agreement with non-federal interests, whereby the US federal government acquired the right to 24.3 percent of the power produced at the non-federal Navajo Generating Station, Navajo Project. The agreement also includes the delivery of power and energy over the transmission facilities to delivery points within the Central Arizona Project service area.

Construction of the project began in 1973 with the award of a contract for the Havasu Intake Channel Dike and excavation for the Havasu Pumping Plant (later renamed as the Mark Wilmer Pumping Plant) on the shores of Lake Havasu. Construction of the other project features, such as the New Waddell Dam, followed. The backbone aqueduct system, which runs about 336 miles (541 km) from Lake Havasu to a terminus 14 miles (23 km) southwest of Tucson, was declared substantially complete in 1993.

In 1994, the new and modified dams constructed as part of the project were declared substantially complete. All of the non-Native American agricultural water distribution systems were completed in the late 1980s, as were most of the municipal water delivery systems. Several Native American distribution systems remain to be built; it is estimated that full development of these systems could require another 10 to 20 years.

Construction of the canal cost more than $4.4 billion. Covering the canal to limit evaporation would have quadrupled the cost, and was therefore not done.

The CAP partly funded the Brock Reservoir project with $28.6 million. In return for its contribution, Arizona has been awarded 100,000 acre-feet (120,000,000 m^{3}) of water per year since 2016.

The CAP project brought river water to Tucson successfully, but the initial implementation was called a "debacle" by the Tucson Weekly. The river water had a different mineral mixture and flow pattern from the aquifer water, stirring up and dislodging rust and biofilm in municipal water mains and house pipes.

By the end of 1993, the city of Tucson paid about $145,000 to install filters in 925 homes, lost about $200,000 in revenues by adjusting water bills, and paid about $450,000 in damages claimed by homeowners for ruined pipes, water heaters, and other appliances. The city returned some houses to groundwater, but problems remained. Zinc orthophosphate was added to coat the pipes and prevent the rust from dislodging, but the return to groundwater removed the zinc orthophosphate. The solution was a US Environmental Protection Agency-funded "blended" water system, including automatically monitoring water quality throughout Tucson, and a website to report the water quality to the public without intervention by the Tucson Water Department.

In August 2026, the US federal government announced reductions to the amount of water that the canal can draw from the Colorado River.

== See also ==
- List of canals in the United States
