= Arizona State Route 76 =

Former state highway in Arizona, United States

State Route 76
- A map of SR 76 in 1988; Completed and designated segments highlighted in red; incomplete and undesignated segments highlighted in black; unbuilt and proposed segments highlighted in transparent black

Route information
- Maintained by ADOT
- Length: 11.16 mi (17.96 km) Length includes both discontinuous sections of SR 76
- Existed: December 28, 1962–December 16, 1988
- History: Was planned to be continuous between Benson and San Manuel

Southern segment
- South end: I-10 / I-10 BL in Benson
- North end: Pomerene Road in Pomerene

Northern segment
- South end: Dead end near San Manuel
- North end: SR 77 near San Manuel

Location
- Country: United States
- State: Arizona
- Counties: Cochise, Pinal

Highway system
- Arizona State Highway System; Interstate; US; State; Scenic Proposed; Former
| ← SR 75 | → SR 77 |

Arizona State Route 76 (SR 76) was a short state highway in eastern central Arizona, United States that connected State Route 77 to the San Manuel Copper Mine and San Manuel with a detached southern segment connecting Pomerene to Benson. The highway was planned to be completed through Pima County between Pomerene and San Manuel. However, it was never completed, and the next planned segment was abandoned during construction. Two other sections were constructed north of Pomerene and south of Redington but were never formally designated SR 76 or connected to the rest of the route.

The northernmost section of the highway, between SR 77 and the San Manuel mine, was decommissioned by ADOT in 1974, with the remainder of the route being decommissioned in 1988. Subsequently, the right of way acquired for the incomplete extension was sold off. ADOT continues to recognize SR 76 as a de facto designation, though all sections of the former route are unsigned and have mostly become locally maintained roads.

== Route description ==
State Route 76 began at an interchange with Interstate 10 exit 306 and I-10 Business (former SR 86) in eastern Benson. I-10 Business transitioned into the southern section of SR 76 after a grade-separated interchange with I-10. SR 76 continued north along Pomerene Road, unsigned. Upon reaching the point where Pomerene Road curved westward, the SR 76 designation and state ownership of Pomerene Road ended, creating a discontinuous gap in the highway. The highway was meant to be continued through Pima County along the San Pedro River valley to San Manuel, but was never completed.

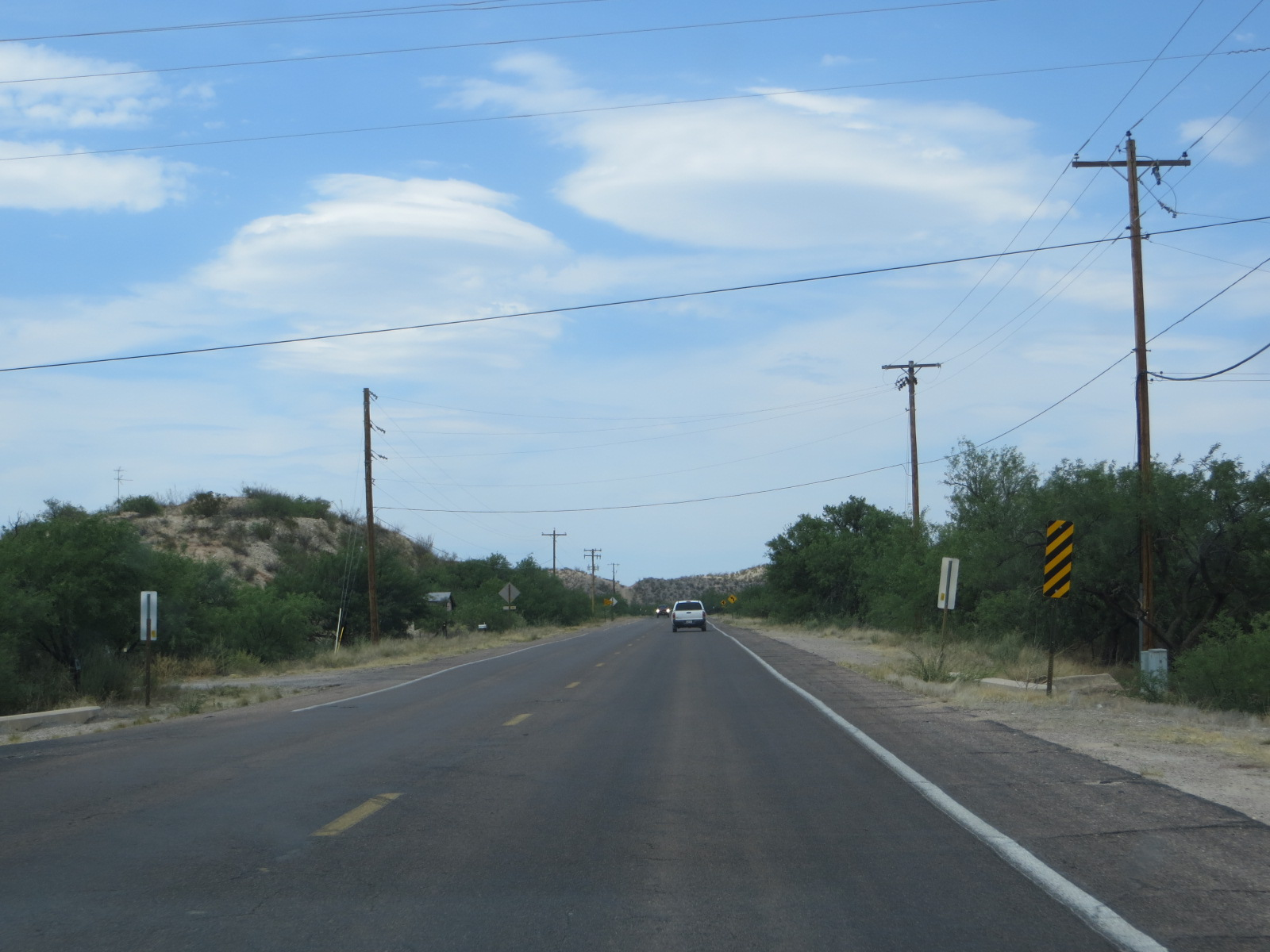
Pomerene Road (former SR 76) heading north from Benson

Two additional segments of the highway existed in Redington and directly north of Pomerene. Neither segment was formally designated as SR 76. Both sections, currently part of Cascabel Road, have concrete highway bridges spanning two dry washes and the San Pedro River. The three bridges are known as the Tres Alamos Wash Bridge, Redfield Canyon Bridge and San Pedro River Bridge, respectively. The section near Pomerene is painted and striped, whereas the Redington section is an unpaved gravel road.

In southeastern Pinal County, an incomplete section of highway, where only the road grading had been completed, exists directly southeast of Peppersauce Wash near San Manuel. The section travels a short distance from the intersection of Redington Road and Veterans Memorial Boulevard before the grading abruptly ends at the edge of a dry wash. This unfinished section of highway is inaccessible to traffic and has been closed off with a permanent roadblock.

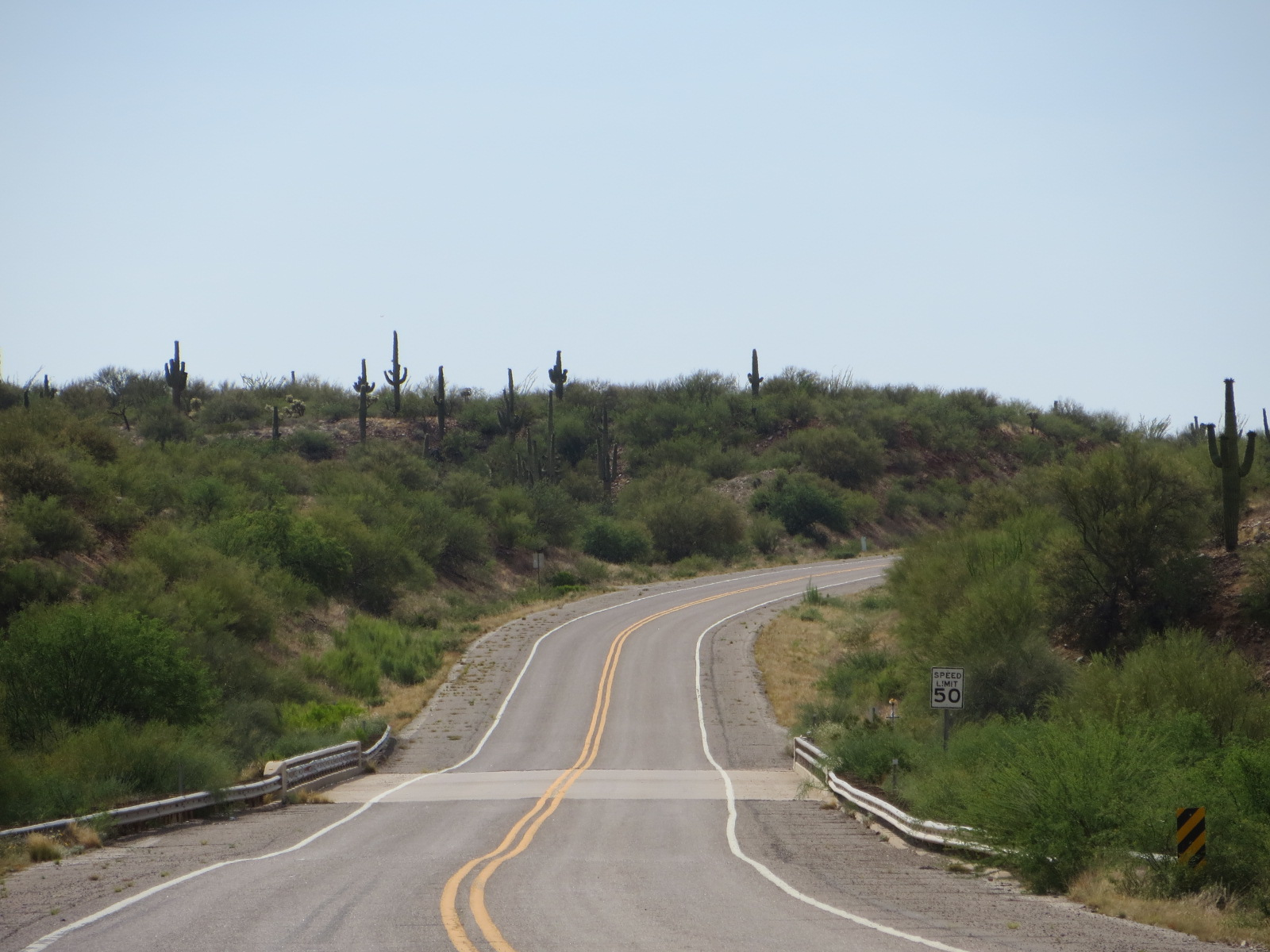
Former SR 76 approaching the Peppersauce Wash Bridge from the south

The designated northern segment of SR 76 began at the incomplete grading near Peppersauce Wash, near an intersection with Redington Road. The highway continued northwest along what is now Veterans Memorial Boulevard towards San Manuel, SR 76 continued along the eastern edge of San Manuel, serving as the main road to the mining town, with access to the town being provided by numerous residential and local arterial roads. The highway continued past San Manuel Airport, paralleling a now abandoned section of the San Manuel Arizona Railroad through mountainous terrain, then curved north, crossing over Cherry Valley Wash. SR 76 proceeded to a grade–separated interchange with SR 77, south of the San Manuel Copper Mine, where the highway ended after 1974. Before 1974, SR 76 continued north towards the copper mine, crossing the San Manuel Railroad by way of an overpass before ending at Tiger Mine Road.

== History ==
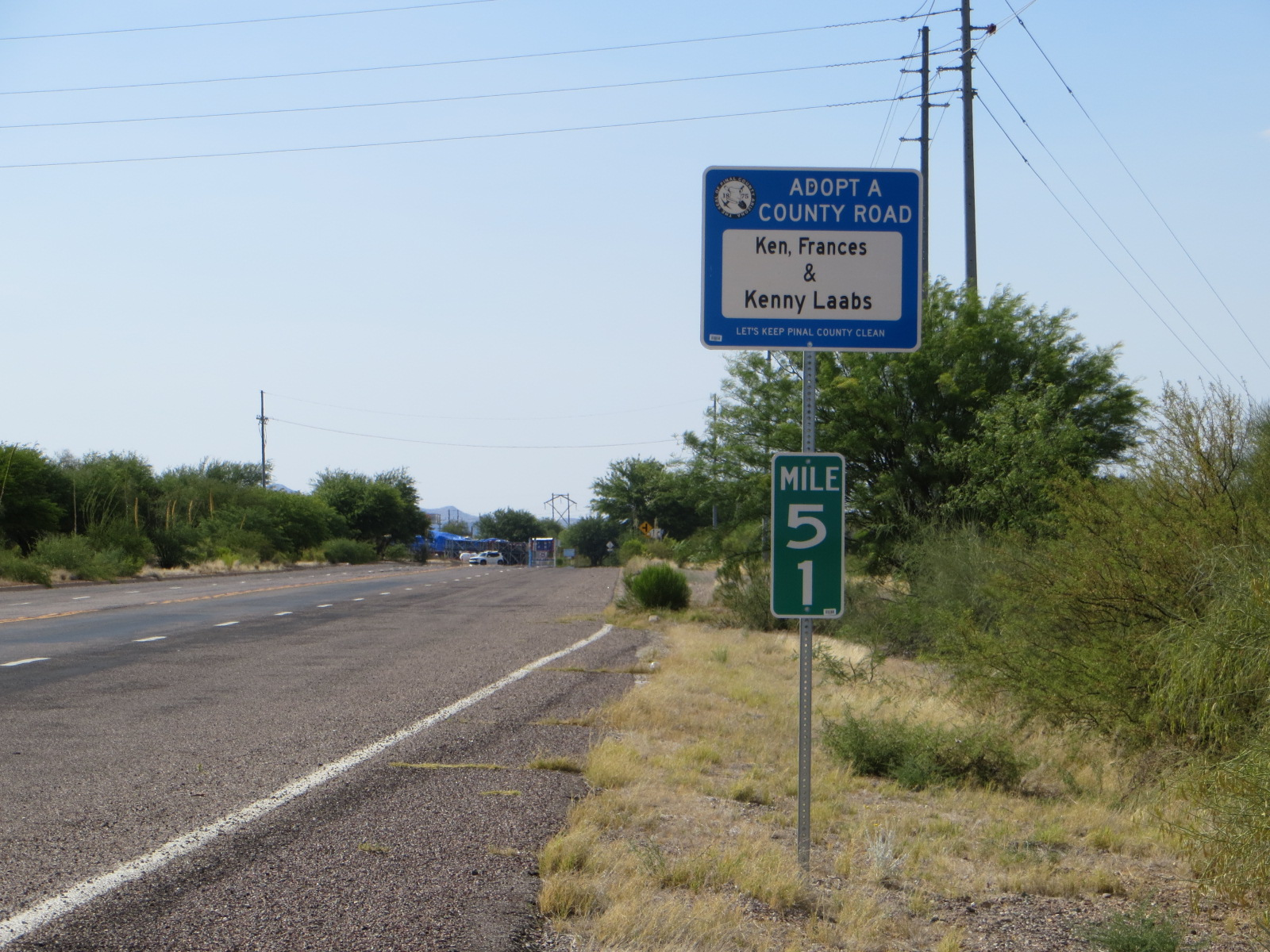
A remaining SR 76 mile marker (milepost 51.00) on Veterans Memorial Boulevard in San Manuel

State Route 76 was first established on December 28, 1962, when the state of Arizona took ownership and maintenance of 6.5 miles (10.5 km) of San Manuel Road in Pinal County between McNab Parkway in San Manuel and the old routing of SR 77 (Tiger Mine Road) next to the open pit of the San Manuel Copper Mine. Although SR 76 was an even–numbered highway, it was signed as a north–south route, due to its longitudinal orientation. Starting in 1967, there was a planned extension to Benson which would have originally been State Route 176. SR 176 was ultimately never designated as a state highway, with the proposed route becoming part of SR 76 proper in 1970. This was done to secure a Secondary Federal Aid Highway designation and federal funding for the proposed route, which had already been allocated to SR 76.

Around 1969, SR 76 was extended further southeast from San Manuel over Peppersauce Wash. A bridge was constructed over Peppersauce Wash, and grading of a further section of SR 76 began southeast of Peppersauce Wash towards the Pinal–Pima County Line. The rest of the highway from Peppersauce Wash to San Manuel Mine had also been improved and paved, with two culverts and a railroad overpass being constructed on the short section north of SR 77. This extended the highway to a total length of 10.37 miles (16.69 km). Construction continued on the route southeast of Peppersauce Wash in Pinal County but never finished. The unpaved grading was left abandoned and is still unused, ending abruptly at a dry wash.

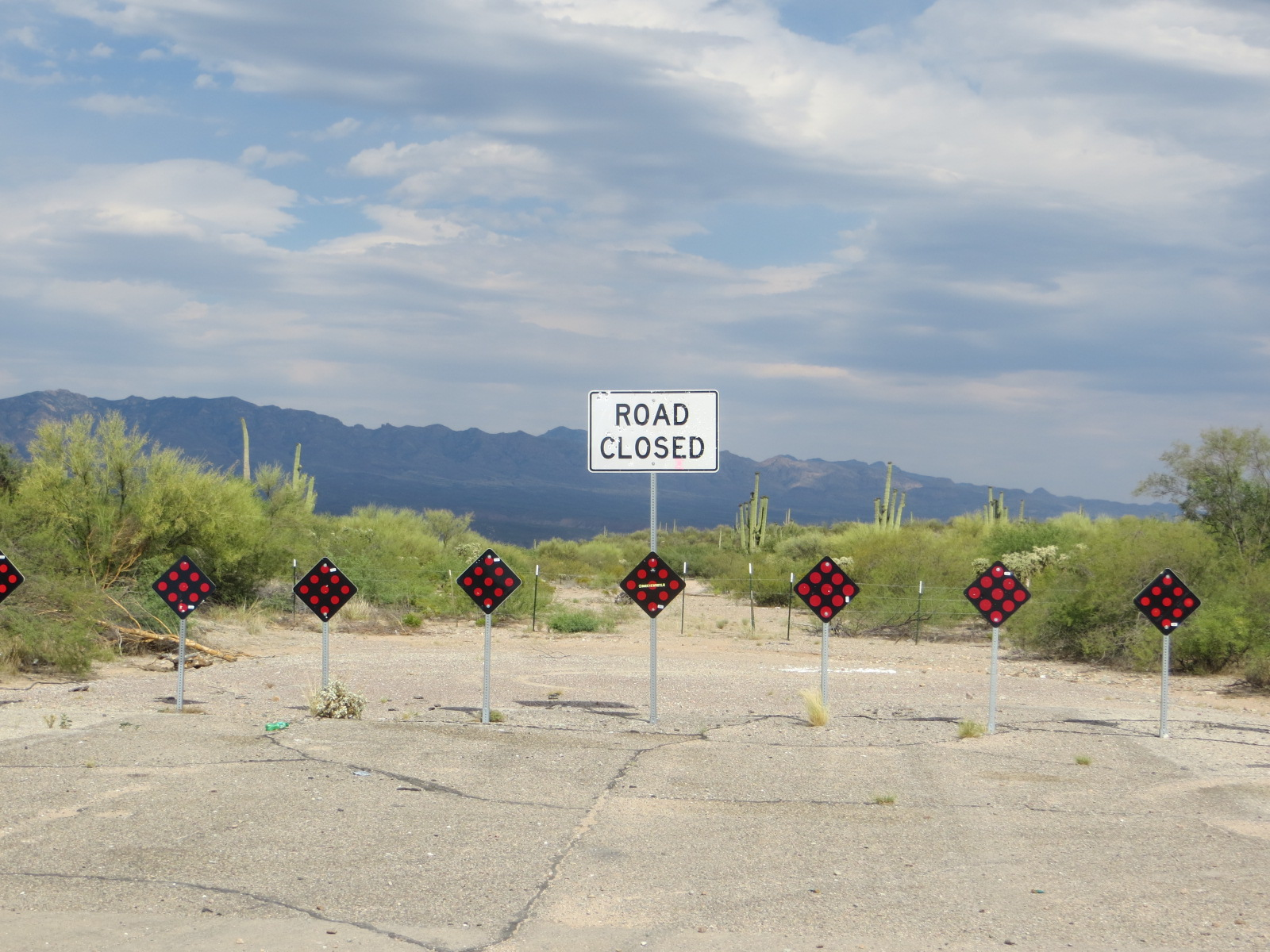
A section of SR 76 south of San Manuel left incomplete and closed to traffic

In Cochise County, a section of Pomerene Road near Benson was taken over by the state of Arizona and rebuilt into a section of SR 76. The newly rebuilt section of the road began at I-10, traveling north then curving west, continuing briefly before reverting to a county–maintained road in Pomerene. Although the state had plans to extend the highway northwest past Pomerene, the proposal never materialized, and the southern section only ever reached a length of 2.06 miles (3 km). Despite being designated as a section of SR 76, Pomerene Road was never signed, where the San Manuel section had been. Construction was begun but never completed on another section of SR 76 near Pomerene. This 1.20-mile (1.93 km) orphaned section of the highway, which included the Tres Alamos Wash Bridge, was meant to connect directly to the Pomerene Road segment. Construction was also completed on two other sections in Pima County outside of Redington, with a combined length of 2.10 miles (3.38 km). This section contained the Redfield Canyon Bridge and the San Pedro River Bridge. These sections were also the only parts of proposed SR 76 to be constructed within Pima County. Despite having been constructed, neither segment was ever designated as part of SR 76. Both orphaned and undesignated sections of SR 76 are currently utilized by Cascabel Road between Pomerene and Redington.

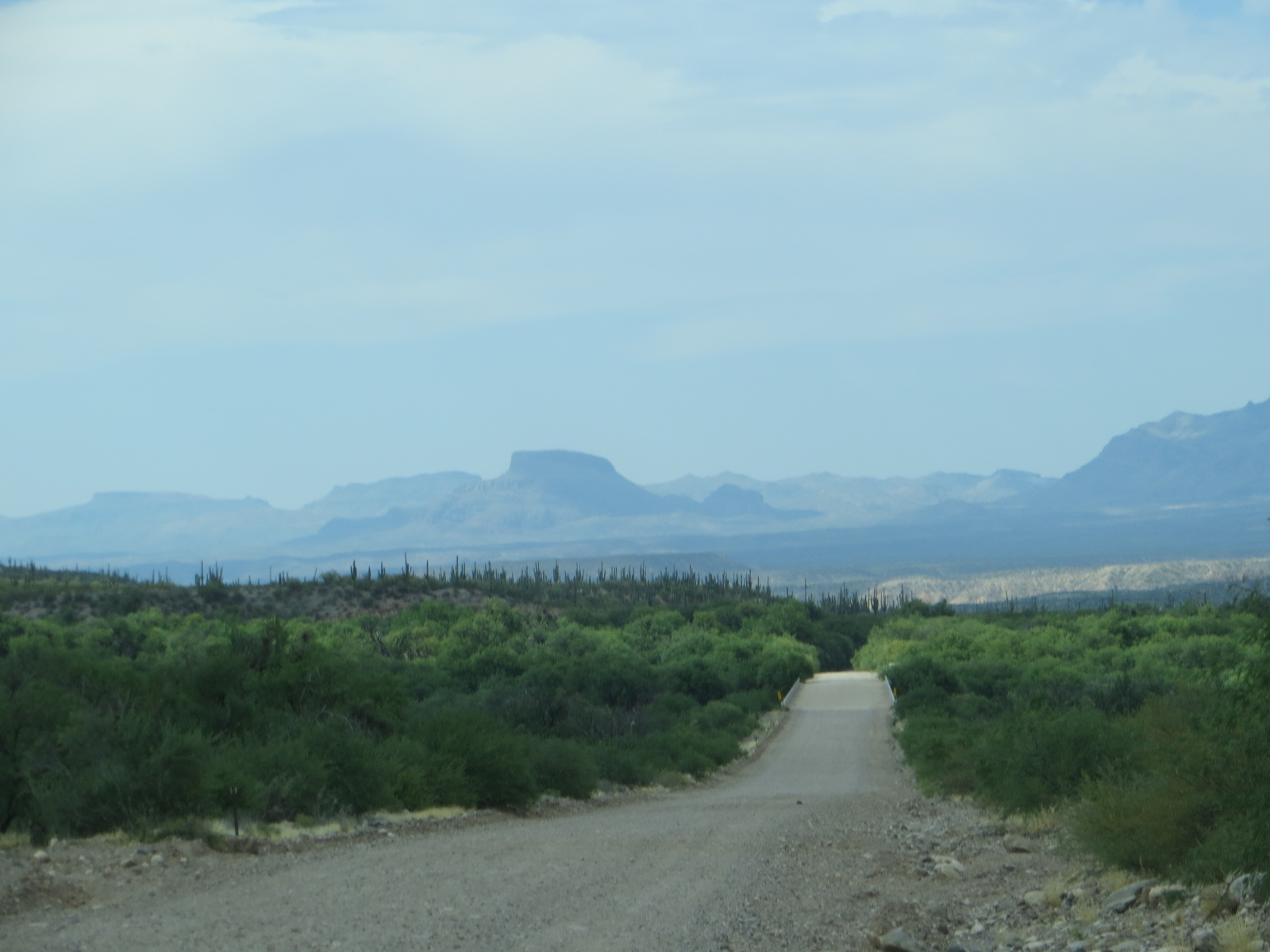
An incomplete section of SR 76 in Redington, heading north across the San Pedro River bridge

With construction canceled between Peppersauce Wash and Pomerene, the two designated sections of SR 76, long with the two undesignated segments, were never connected and the designated portion of the state highway only reached a maximum length of 12.43 miles (20.00 km). Other sections of SR 76 between San Manuel and Benson had been designed, but were never constructed. No designs or surveys were completed near Cascabel. A similar situation existed with the East Fork Road near Los Angeles, California, where construction of the road was abandoned, and left sections of road, including a highway bridge, unused by the planned route.

In 1974, the section of SR 76 between SR 77 and San Manuel Mine was retired from the state highway system and handed over to Pinal County. This reduced the length of SR 76 to 11.16 miles (17.96 km). ADOT chose to cancel the proposed extension altogether in 1988. The short section of SR 76 that was completed near San Manuel was decommissioned as a state highway on December 16 of the same year. The unsigned section of Pomerene Road near Benson was also retired from the state highway system. All right of way ADOT had acquired to construct the highway between Benson and SR 77 was also given away. Although SR 76 was properly decommissioned as an active state highway, the section of Veterans Memorial Boulevard crossing under SR 77, between both the northbound and southbound interchange ramps, is still designated by ADOT as an unsigned section of SR 76, where the remainder of the former highway is no longer owned or maintained by ADOT. As of 2023, State Highway System GIS data suggests ADOT continues to recognize SR 76 as an active designation, including all sections relinquished by the state to local jurisdictions between 1974 and 1988.

== Major intersections ==
The following represents the route of SR 76 as it existed in 1988 before decommissioning.

| County | Location | mi | km | Destinations | Notes |
|---|---|---|---|---|---|
| Cochise | Benson | 0.00 | 0.00 | I-10 / I-10 BL west (Pomerene Road) to US 80 – Tucson, El Paso | Southern terminus; SR 76 was unsigned from here to Pomerene |
| Cochise | Pomerene | 2.06 | 3.32 | Pomerene Road | Road transitioned into a county road north of this point; through route towards San Manuel |
Proposed SR 76 (former SR 176 proposal)
| Pinal | | 47.34 | 76.19 | Dead end | Unfinished grading continued south before ending abruptly |
| Pinal | | 56.36– 56.47 | 90.70– 90.88 | SR 77 – Tucson, Globe | Northern terminus; interchange; roadway continued northwest as Mine Road (former SR 76 north) |
1.000 mi = 1.609 km; 1.000 km = 0.621 mi: Route transition; Unopened

== See also ==
- Arizona State Route 77
- San Manuel Arizona Railroad
- Former state routes in Arizona
- East Fork Road
