= Arizona State Route 77 =

State highway in Arizona, United States

State Route 77
- SR 77 highlighted in red

Route information
- Maintained by ADOT
- Length: 253.93 mi (408.66 km)
- Existed: May 13, 1930–present
- History: Part of the route is a former section of US 80 and US 89
- Tourist routes: Copper Corridor Scenic Road; Historic US 80

Major junctions
- South end: I-10 in Tucson
- US 70 in Globe; US 60 from Globe to Show Low; US 180 in Holbrook; I-40 in Holbrook
- North end: BIA Route 6 at Navajo Nation boundary

Location
- Country: United States
- State: Arizona
- Counties: Pima, Pinal, Gila, Navajo

Highway system
- Arizona State Highway System; Interstate; US; State; Scenic Proposed; Former
← SR 76	→ SR 78

State Route 77 (SR 77) is a 253.93-mile (408.66-kilometre) long state highway in Arizona that traverses much of the state's length, stretching from its southern terminus at a junction with I-10 in Tucson to its northern terminus with BIA Route 6 at the Navajo Nation boundary just north of I-40.

Between Tucson and the Navajo Nation, SR 77 passes through Oro Valley, Oracle, Mammoth, Winkelman, Globe, Show Low, Snowflake and Holbrook, as well as passing through the Fort Apache Indian Reservation and a tiny corner of the San Carlos Apache Indian Reservation. Between Globe and Show Low, SR 77 runs entirely concurrent with US 60. When it was originally commissioned in 1930, SR 77 only traversed the route between McNary and Holbrook. Between 1938 and 1992, the route was slowly re-routed and extended in increments, to its current termini in Tucson and at the Navajo Nation boundary.

== Route description ==
State Route 77 (SR 77) begins at a diamond interchange with Interstate 10 (I-10) Exit 255 in Tucson. The highway proceeds east along West Miracle Mile for 1.5 miles (2.4 kilometres), passing through the Miracle Mile Historic District. West Miracle Mile ends at an intersection with Oracle Road, where SR 77 turns north past the Tucson Mall. After crossing over the Rillito River, SR 77 leaves Tucson and continues north as a six-lane divided highway through the suburban town of Oro Valley and Catalina State Park to Oracle Junction, where SR 77 meets SR 79 at an intersection. SR 79 continues north towards Florence, while SR 77 proceeds northeast. The divided highway segment of SR 77 ends just past Oracle Junction. SR 77 continues through Oracle, passing the Biosphere 2 complex to a grade–separated interchange with Veterans Memorial Boulevard (former SR 76), which acts as the main connection between SR 77 and San Manuel, as well as a private road, off limits to the public, servicing the San Manuel Copper Mine complex.

SR 77 curves to the north past San Manuel into Mammoth, now paralleling the San Pedro River to the east. North of town, the highway crosses over the San Pedro River and continues paralleling the river on the eastern side. SR 77 continues north, passing by the Central Arizona College Aravaipa Campus and Arizona College of Technology, proceeding through Dudleyville into Winkelman, where SR 77 crosses over the Gila River, next to the old Winkelman Bridge. In town, the intersection with 2nd Street marks the southern terminus of SR 177, which continues west on 2nd Street, then northwest towards Superior. SR 77 continues north through town, then parallels the western bank of the Gila River to the northeast. After following the river for 7 miles (11 kilometres), SR 77 curves northwest, passing through Dripping Springs, then curves northeast through El Capitan, past Pinal Peak to a junction with U.S. Route 70 (US 70) just outside of Globe.

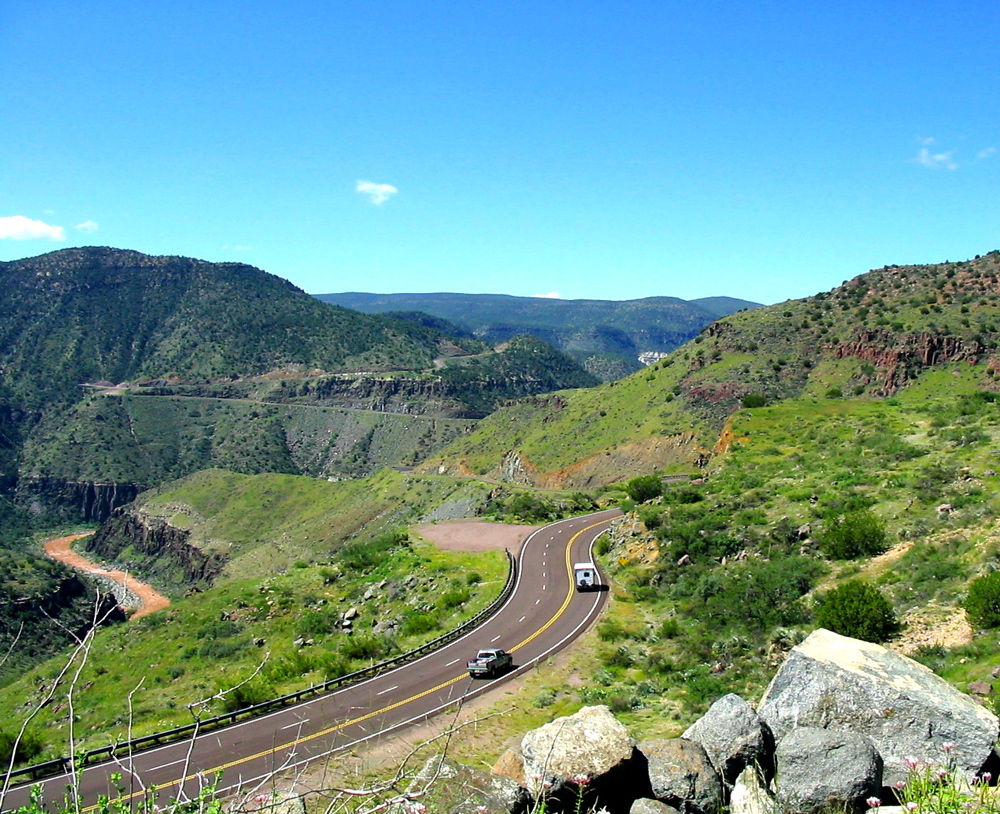
SR 77 traveling through Salt River Canyon

US 70 and SR 77 run west concurrently to the outskirts of Globe, where the former highway ends at US 60. SR 77 turns northeast and runs concurrently with US 60 out of Globe, entering the Salt River Canyon, briefly entering the San Carlos Apache Indian Reservation before continuing into the Fort Apache Indian Reservation. Inside the reservation boundaries US 60 and SR 77 act as the southern terminus of SR 73. Both highways arrive in Show Low, with the highway being named "Deuce of Clubs" through town. Entering town, US 60 and SR 77 meet SR 260 at a traffic controlled intersection with Clark Road. From this intersection, all three highways run concurrently on Deuce of Clubs into the center of town. SR 260 separates from US 60 and SR 77 at the east side of Show Low, continuing towards Eagar on White Mountain Road. US 60 and SR 77 continue ahead on Deuce of Clubs, to an intersection with Penrod Road, where SR 77 separates from US 60, heading north past the Show Low Regional Airport.

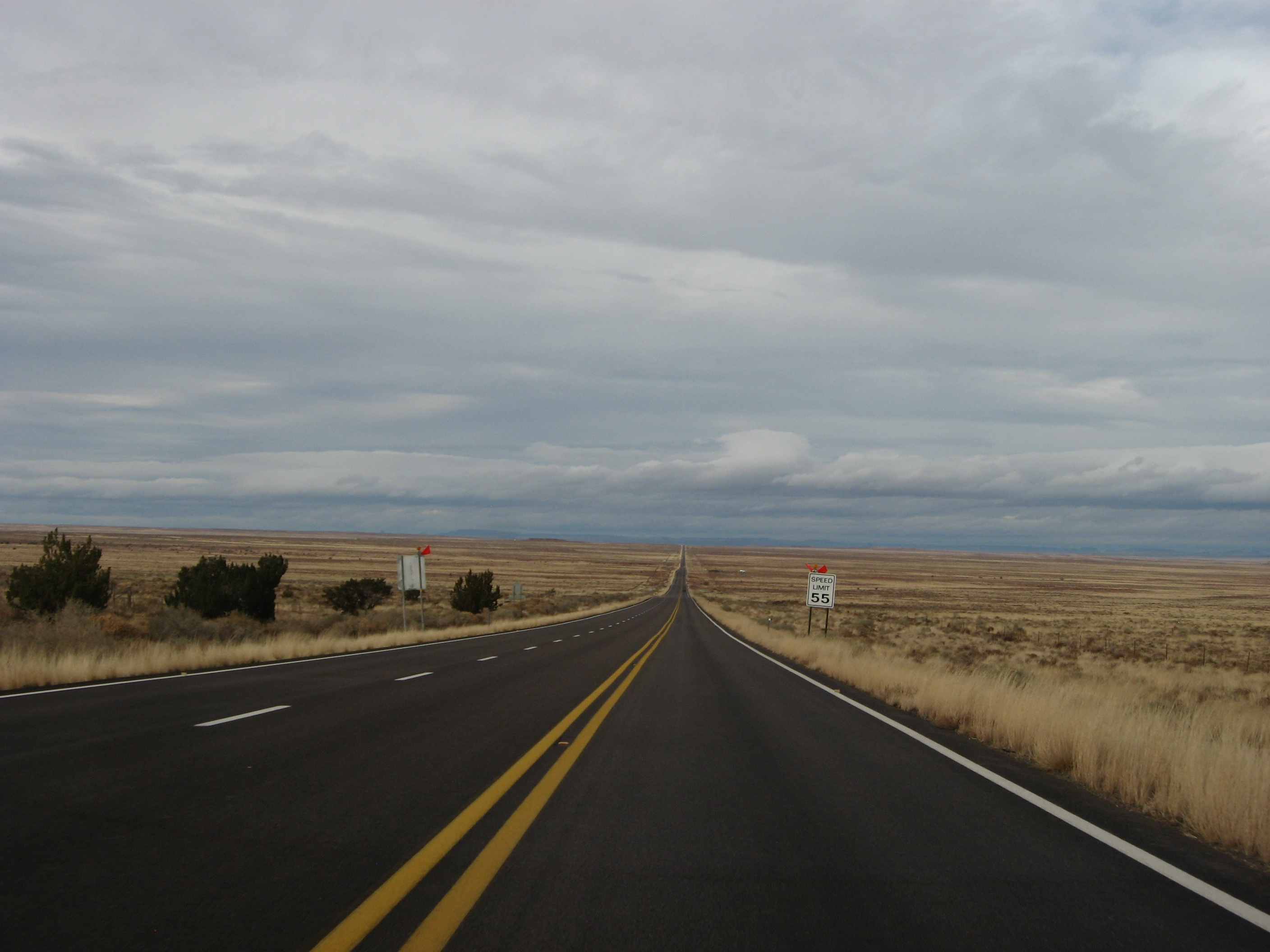
SR 77 between Snowflake and Holbrook

SR 77 continues due north through the communities of Shumway and Taylor, becoming Main Street in Snowflake. SR 77 intersects with the eastern terminus of SR 277 at 3rd Street North on the northern edge of town. Following Main Street north out of Snowflake, SR 77 crosses a bridge over Cottonwood Wash. The highway continues north, intersecting the northern terminus of SR 377 at a "wye" intersection on the outskirts of Holbrook, in front of the Navajo County Superior Court. North of the Superior Court, SR 77 meets US 180 at a junction, where US 180 joins SR 77. Both highways continue north concurrently on Apache Avenue, crossing over the Little Colorado River into downtown Holbrook, where Apache Avenue becomes Navajo Boulevard. At the intersection with Hopi Drive, which carries part of the I-40 Business Loop (I-40 Bus.), US 180 leaves SR 77, heading west with I-40 Bus. towards Winslow and Flagstaff. SR 77 continues north on Navajo Boulevard, concurrent with I-40 Bus. to I-40 exit 286. SR 77 leaves Navajo Boulevard and I-40 Bus., becoming concurrent with I-40 heading east. On the edge of town, Navajo Boulevard and I-40 Bus. loop back to I-40/SR 77 at exit 289. At exit 292, SR 77 leaves I-40 continuing north towards the Navajo Nation. SR 77 ends at the Navajo Nation boundary, north of Holbrook. Past the Navajo Nation boundary, SR 77 becomes BIA Route 6 northbound to SR 264 near Keams Canyon.

== History ==
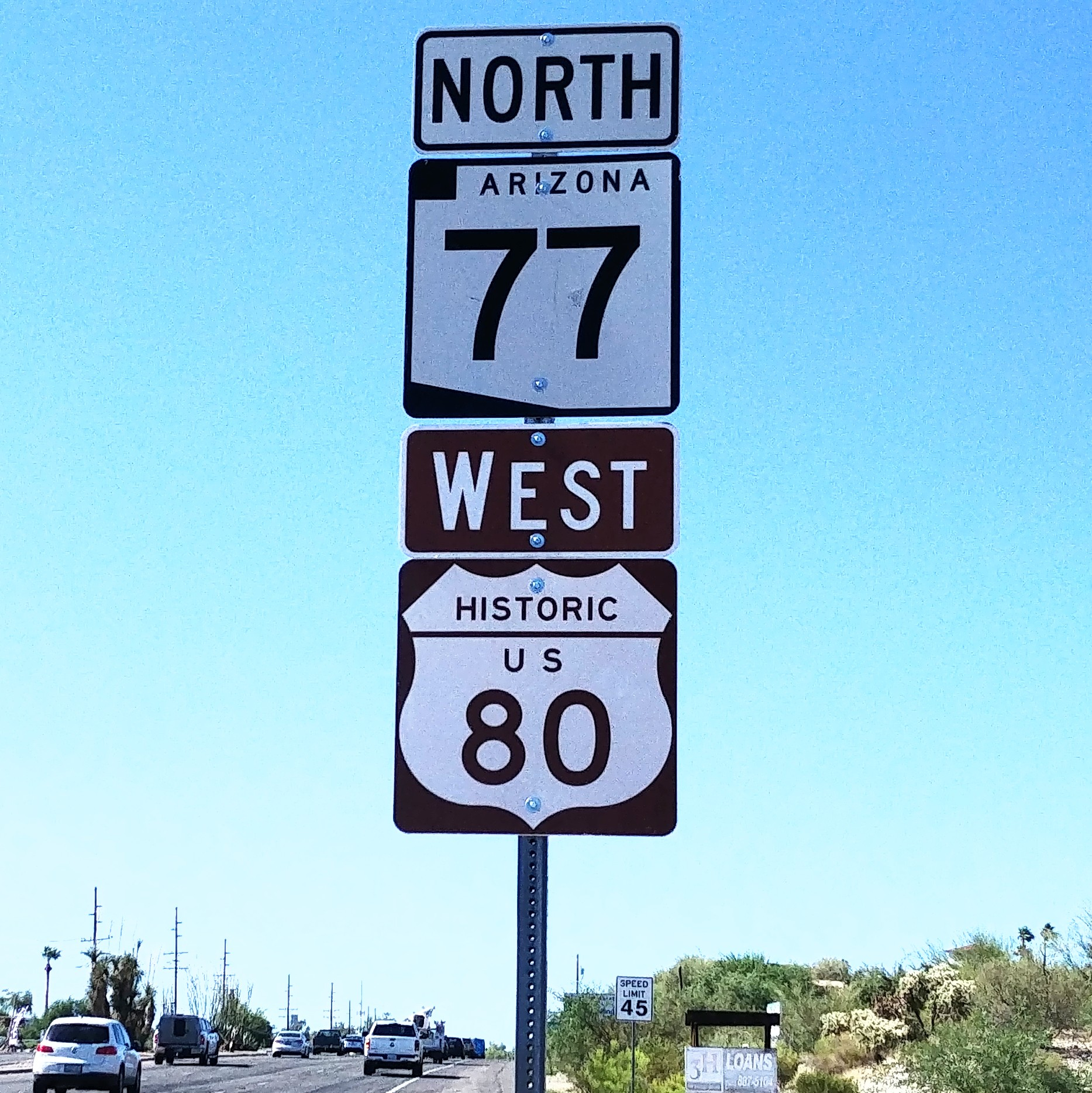
Between Miracle Mile and SR 79, SR 77 is part of Historic U.S. Route 80.

State Route 77 (SR 77) was first designated on May 13, 1930. The highway originally ran from a junction with SR 73 in McNary to U.S. Route 66 (US 66) in Holbrook via Show Low. On June 20, 1938, the section of SR 77 between Show Low and McNary was decommissioned, following the completion of US 60 from Globe to Springerville through Show Low. SR 77 was then extended southwest along the brand new US 60 to Globe, followed by a further southeast extension along US 70 from Globe to Cutter at the San Carlos Indian Reservation. From Cutter, SR 77 was extended further south along a newly acquired state highway to a southern terminus with US 80/US 89 in Oracle Junction. At the time, both U.S. Highways made up the route between Tucson and Oracle Junction.

US 80 was removed from the Tucson to Oracle Junction corridor in 1977, when the U.S. Highway was truncated to I-10 in Benson. On August 21, 1992, US 89 was truncated to US 180 in Flagstaff. At the same time, the northern Tucson section of the Interstate 10 Business Loop (I-10 Business) was decommissioned. I-10 Business started at an intersection with I-10 and Miracle Mile, heading east on Miracle Mile to US 89, then followed US 89 south on Oracle to its terminus at a junction with US 89, I-10, and I-19 Business in South Tucson, Arizona. SR 77 was immediately extended south along former US 89 down Oracle Road to Miracle Mile in Tucson, then extended west along Miracle Mile (which was part of the recently decommissioned I-10 Business) to an interchange with I-10. While Miracle Mile and the northern segment of Oracle Road were renumbered as an extension of SR 77, the remainder of I-10 Business and US 89 between the intersection of Oracle Road and Miracle Mile and the interchange with I-10 and I-19 Business were not given to another route and was retired as a state highway, being handed over to the city of Tucson on October 15, 1993.

=== Origin of the name of Tucson's Miracle Mile ===
Although it was thought for several years that Tucson's Miracle Mile derived its name from a June 1937 Arizona Highways magazine, historian David Leighton challenged this theory, in a February 23, 2015, article in the Arizona Daily Star newspaper. He explained that in 1936, real estate developer Stanley Williamson conceived the idea of creating a commercial center outside of the over-congested downtown retail district, in Tucson. His model for this business center was the Miracle Mile in Los Angeles, California. The one in Los Angeles was the idea of real estate agent A.W. Ross, who saw that the retail district in that city was overcrowded and that cars were becoming more common. He came up with the idea of buying farming land along Wilshire Boulevard, several miles out from downtown, with the belief that as more people bought automobiles, they would be willing to drive farther to avoid the lack of parking and congestion in the downtown area. While initially no one thought his idea would work, in time store after store came to his business center. The Miracle Mile eventually became one of Los Angeles' premier shopping districts. Ross originally called his business area the Wilshire Boulevard Center; it was changed to the Miracle Mile in 1928.

== Junction list ==
County	Location	mi (Note: The mileage reflects the official ADOT mileposts along SR 77. The mileposts reflecting SR 77 only are based on former US 89. Milepost 0.00 was on US 89 (now SR 19 Bus.) at the United States–Mexico border in Nogales.)	km	Exit	Destinations	Notes
Pima	Tucson	68.05	109.52		I-10 – Phoenix, El Paso	Southern terminus; I-10 exit 255
Pima	Tucson	69.05	111.13		Oracle Road south (Historic US 80 east) – Tucson City Center	Southern end of Historic US 80 concurrency; former US 80 east / US 89 / SR 93 south
Pima	Oro Valley	79.12	127.33		Tangerine Road (SR 989 west)	Serves Oro Valley Hospital
Pinal	Oracle Junction	91.14	146.68		SR 79 north / Historic US 80 west (Pinal Pioneer Parkway) – Florence, Phoenix	Northern end of Historic US 80 concurrency; southern terminus of SR 79; former US 80 west / US 89 north
Pinal		109.14	175.64		Veterans Memorial Boulevard – San Manuel	Interchange; serves San Manuel Airport; former SR 76
Gila River		134.62	216.65		Bridge	
Gila	Winkelman	134.80	216.94		SR 177 north (2nd Street) – Superior	Southern terminus of SR 177
Gila	Globe	170.92 254.10	275.07 408.93		US 70 east – Safford	Southern end of US 70 concurrency; mile markers change to reflect US 70
Gila	Globe	252.14 252.06	405.78 405.65		US 70 ends / US 60 west (Ash Street west) – Globe, Phoenix	Southern end of US 60 concurrency; northern end of US 70 concurrency; mileposts change to reflect US 60
Navajo		318.15	512.01		SR 73 east	Western terminus of SR 73
Navajo	Show Low	339.73	546.74		SR 260 west (Clark Road) – Heber	Southern end of SR 260 concurrency
Navajo	Show Low	341.69	549.90		SR 260 east (White Mountain Road) – Pinetop-Lakeside	Northern end of SR 260 concurrency
Navajo	Show Low	342.01 342.20	550.41 550.72		US 60 east (Deuce of Clubs east) – Springerville	Northern end of US 60 concurrency; mileposts change to reflect SR 77
Navajo	Snowflake	361.05	581.05		SR 277 west (3rd Street North) – Heber	Eastern terminus of SR 277
Navajo	Holbrook	386.20	621.53		SR 377 south (Heber Road) – Heber	Northern terminus of SR 377
Navajo	Holbrook	387.49	623.60		US 180 east – St. Johns	Southern end of US 180 concurrency
Navajo	Holbrook	388.54 286.69	625.29 461.38		BL 40 / US 180 / Historic US 66 west (Hopi Drive) to I-40 – Flagstaff	Northern end of US 180 overlap; southern end of I-40 BL/Historic US 66 concurrency; former US 66 west; mileposts change to reflect I-40 BL
Navajo	Holbrook	287.36 286.91	462.46 461.74		BL 40 / Historic US 66 east (Navajo Boulevard) / I-40 west – Flagstaff	Northern end of I-40 BL/Historic US 66 concurrency; southern end of I-40 concurrency; I-40 exit 286; former US 66 east; mileposts change to reflect I-40
Navajo	Holbrook	289.46	465.84	289	BL 40 / Historic US 66 west (Navajo Boulevard)	Exit number follows I-40; former US 66 west
Navajo		292.83 395.07	471.26 635.80		I-40 east – Albuquerque	Northern end of I-40 concurrency; I-40 exit 292; mileposts change to reflect SR 77
Navajo		408.93	658.11		BIA Route 6 north	Continuation beyond northern terminus at Navajo Nation boundary
1.000 mi = 1.609 km; 1.000 km = 0.621 mi: Concurrency terminus; Route transition
