= Benson Historic Barrio =

- U.S. National Register of Historic Places
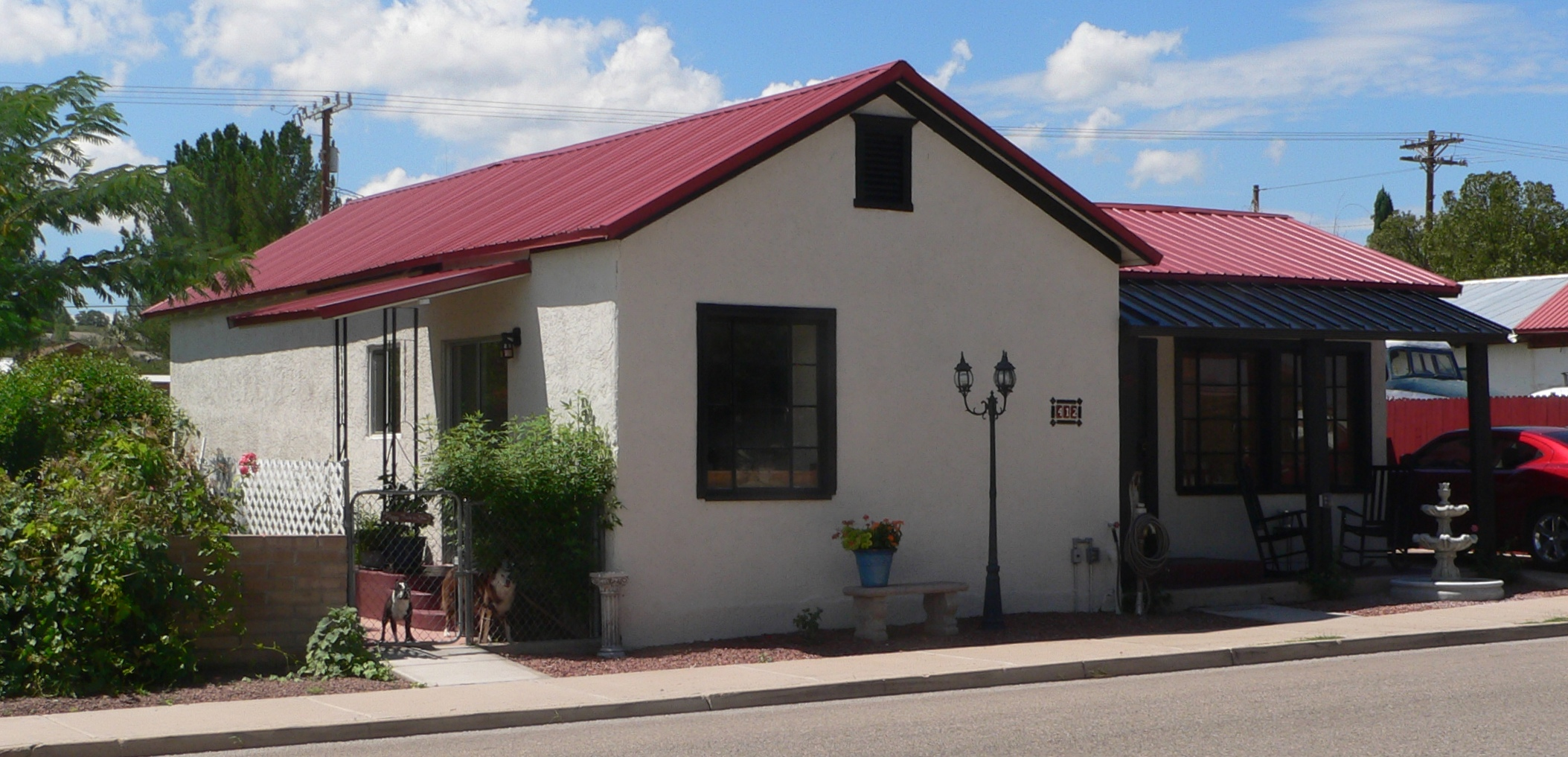
- 412 East Fifth Street

- Location within Arizona Location within the United States
- Location: Benson, Arizona
- Coordinates: 31°57′59″N 110°17′33″W
- NRHP reference No.: 11000174
- Added to NRHP: April 8, 2011

The Benson Historic Barrio is a small neighborhood in Benson, Arizona. It began to develop between 1898 and 1901, settled primarily with people of Mexican descent. It is located on the east side of the original townsite, just south of the business district, and comprises three blocks along both sides of East Fifth Street, encompassing blocks, 19, 20, 21, 23, 24, and 25. It includes houses, lots, other buildings, and Our Lady of Lourdes Catholic Church.

== History ==
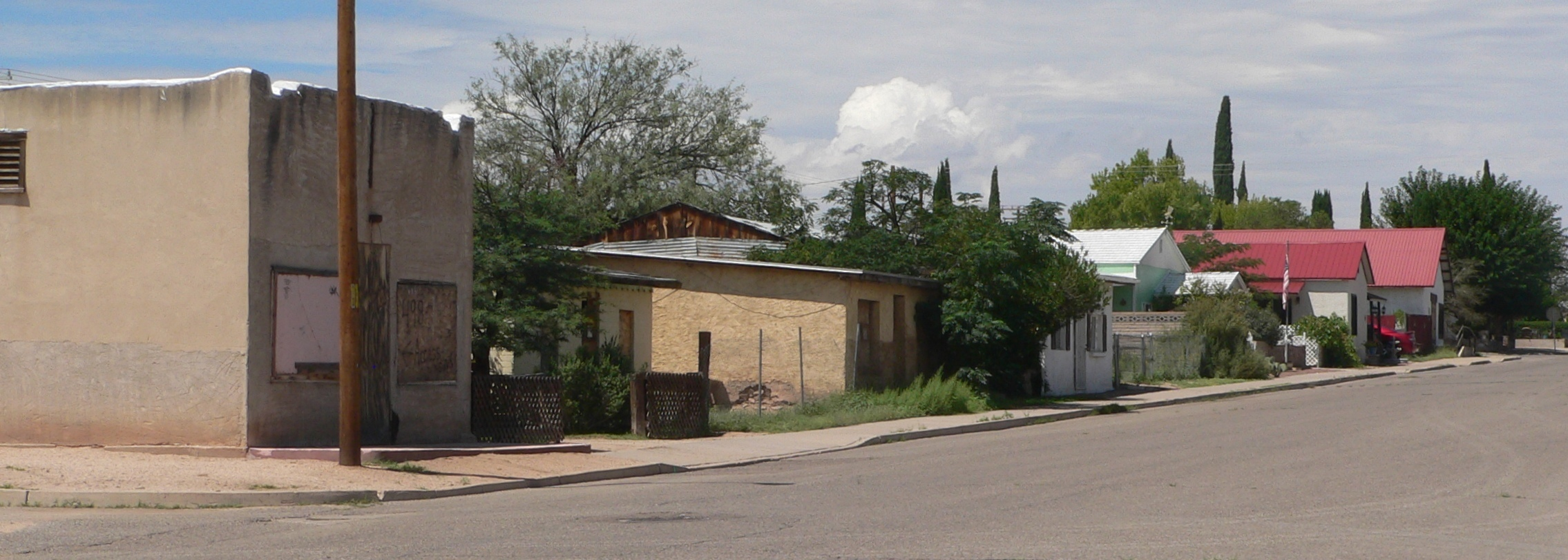
Benson, Arizona 400s block E 5 St S side fr San Carlos

Our Lady of Lourdes Catholic Church was built in 1895 by Don Miguel Jose Castaneda, a hotel owner, and William Ohnesorgen, a former station master at the Middle Crossing of the San Pedro River. It was on the corner of East Fifth and Gila. There was already a Mexican community just to the east of San Pedro. It was located The barrio began to develop between 1898 and 1901, east of San Pedro Street and straddling both sides of East Fifth Street. The barrio is split by two cross streets, Gila Street and San Carlos Street, one block to its west. West of Gila Street, employees of the railroad built frame houses, which became known as "Barrio Americano", while east of Gila, the houses were built by farming and ranching families, mostly of Mexican descent, and were built in the Mexican style of adobe, which became known as "Barrio Mexicano".

The Barrio Americano began around 1900 on block 19. Only three of these original houses remain, 351, 369, and 393 East Fifth Street. In 1901, block 25 began development, with the construction of three houses, but only one of those, #347, still stands. Barrio Mexicano began to develop between 1898 and 1901, with several Mexican families building houses on blocks 20 and 24. They had migrated from places like Redington, Cascabel, and Tres Alamos, and had come to town to find work. While some worked for the local railroad or smelter, others were tradesmen, and still others opened small shops, where they also resided. There was even a concrete jail.

During the 1920s, more Mexican families moved into the area, purchasing the homes in the Barrio Americano. When the Apache Powder Company was built, many of the Barrio residents were employed there, and throughout the Great Depression. The area also contained several "mom and pop" stores, like Deliciosa Cafe and Quihuiz Grocery. The church and the Knights of Pythias hall also had significant roles in the community.

After World War II, Alianza Hispano-Americano, a mutual aid society, became a presence in the Barrio, using a building they had obtained from Fort Huachuca. Homes built during this period included numbers 412 (1940), 572 (1944), and 534 (1945) Fifth Street. The historic structures remaining in the district today include several of the early 1900s houses, some second generation homes from the 1920s and 1930s, and a few built in the 1940s and prior to 1957.

== Site description ==
The historic district consists of 33 contributing structures and 8 non-contributing buildings. 6 of the 8 non-contributing buildings are due to being too recent, the other two are just beyond repair. The contributing structures range in building dates of 1900 to 1957. Below is a list of the contributing structures, all addresses are on East Fifth Street.

Address	Construction year	Style
345	1900	Side-gable vernacular
351	1900	Gable-front vernacular
369	1900	Gable-front vernacular
371	1925	Side-gable vernacular
387	1925	Side-gable vernacular
393	1905	Gable-front vernacular
411	1910	Gable-front vernacular
400 Block	1930	Vernacular Shed
419	1928	Gable-front vernacular
427	1905	Gable-front vernacular
463	1900	Gable-front vernacular
Jail	1915	Jail vernacular
572	1944	Cross-wing vernacular
550	1930	Pyramidal vernacular
546	1910	Gable-front vernacular
534	1945	Vernacular-side gable
526	1916	Side-gable vernacular
512	1932	Side-gable vernacular
504	1905, 1940	Hip-roof vernacular
498	1936	Parapet-commercial vernacular
482	1925	Side-gable vernacular
480	1936	Gable-commercial vernacular
478	1905	Trans, side-gable vernacular
464	1939	Side-gable vernacular
452	1928	Side-gable vernacular
412	1940	Cross-wing vernacular
418	1900, 1957	Gable-front vernacular
408	1925	Gable-commercial vernacular
383	1950	Side-gable vernacular
383	1948	Modern church
374	1900	Gable-block/wing vernacular
362	1956	Gable-front vernacular
203 S. San Pedro St.	1937	Bungalow

== Historical significance ==
The Barrio has been the residence of mostly families of Mexican or mixed-Mexican descent throughout its history. It has maintained its distinctive identity, and been a cohesive community centered around the church, its local small businesses, the social club, and the jail. While it is most commonly known as "The Barrio", other names it is called include, “Sal Si Puede" (Run if You Can), the “Mexican District” and “Tortilla Flats.”

In the late 1800s and early 1900s, rural life became increasingly difficult, and the town of Benson offered employment opportunities, including the railroad and smelter. The Barrio has been a significant component of the development of Benson through the decades. During the historic era, it was a contrast to the rest of the town, which was comprised mostly by Euroamerican-inhabited neighborhoods west of San Pedro Street.

While most of the property is still owned by descendants of the original owners, some residences have been destroyed and others are abandoned. Economic conditions in Benson have not provided opportunities for the younger generations, and they are moving away. While some historic houses are being rehabilitated by newcomers, the Barrio as a whole is threatened by the advanced level of deterioration of its unoccupied properties.
