= Benson Historic District =

Benson Historic District or variations may refer to:

- Benson Historic Barrio, listed on the National Register of Historic Places (NRHP)
- Benson Historic District (Benson, North Carolina), NRHP-listed
- Benson Commercial Historic District, Omaha, Nebraska, NRHP-listed
