= E77 =

E77 may refer to:

- King's Indian Defense, Encyclopaedia of Chess Openings code
- European route E77, an international road
- E 77 road (United Arab Emirates)
- E77 balloon bomb, an American anti-crop biological munition
- DRG Class E 77, a German locomotive class
- San Manuel Airport FAA code near San Manuel, Arizona, United States
- Kyushu Chūō Expressway, route E77 in Japan
