= Arizona State Route 79 =

State highway in Arizona, United States

State Route 79
- Pinal Pioneer Parkway
- SR 79 highlighted in red; SR 79 Bus. in blue

Route information
- Maintained by ADOT
- Length: 58.40 mi (93.99 km)
- Existed: 1992–present
- History: The entire route is a former section of US 80 and US 89
- Tourist routes: Historic US 80

Major junctions
- South end: SR 77 / Historic US 80 in Oracle Jct.
- SR 287 in Florence; US 60 in Florence Jct.
- North end: El Camino Viejo in Florence Jct.

Location
- Country: United States
- State: Arizona
- Counties: Pinal

Highway system
- Arizona State Highway System; Interstate; US; State; Scenic Proposed; Former
← SR 79	→ US 80

State Route 79 (SR 79), also known as the Pinal Pioneer Parkway, is a 58.40-mile-long (93.99 km) state highway in the U.S. state of Arizona. It serves as the main route through the town of Florence, which is also the county seat of Pinal County. Although the highway has been part of the state highway system since at least 1926, it was not designated as SR 79 until 1992. The highway was previously a section of U.S. Route 80 and U.S. Route 89 between Phoenix and Tucson, until both highways were decommissioned in 1977 and 1992 respectively. SR 79 is also the only state highway in Arizona that has a business route, which is SR 79 Business through downtown Florence. SR 79 is also notable for being the location where cowboy western actor Tom Mix died in a car accident on October 14, 1940.

== Route description ==
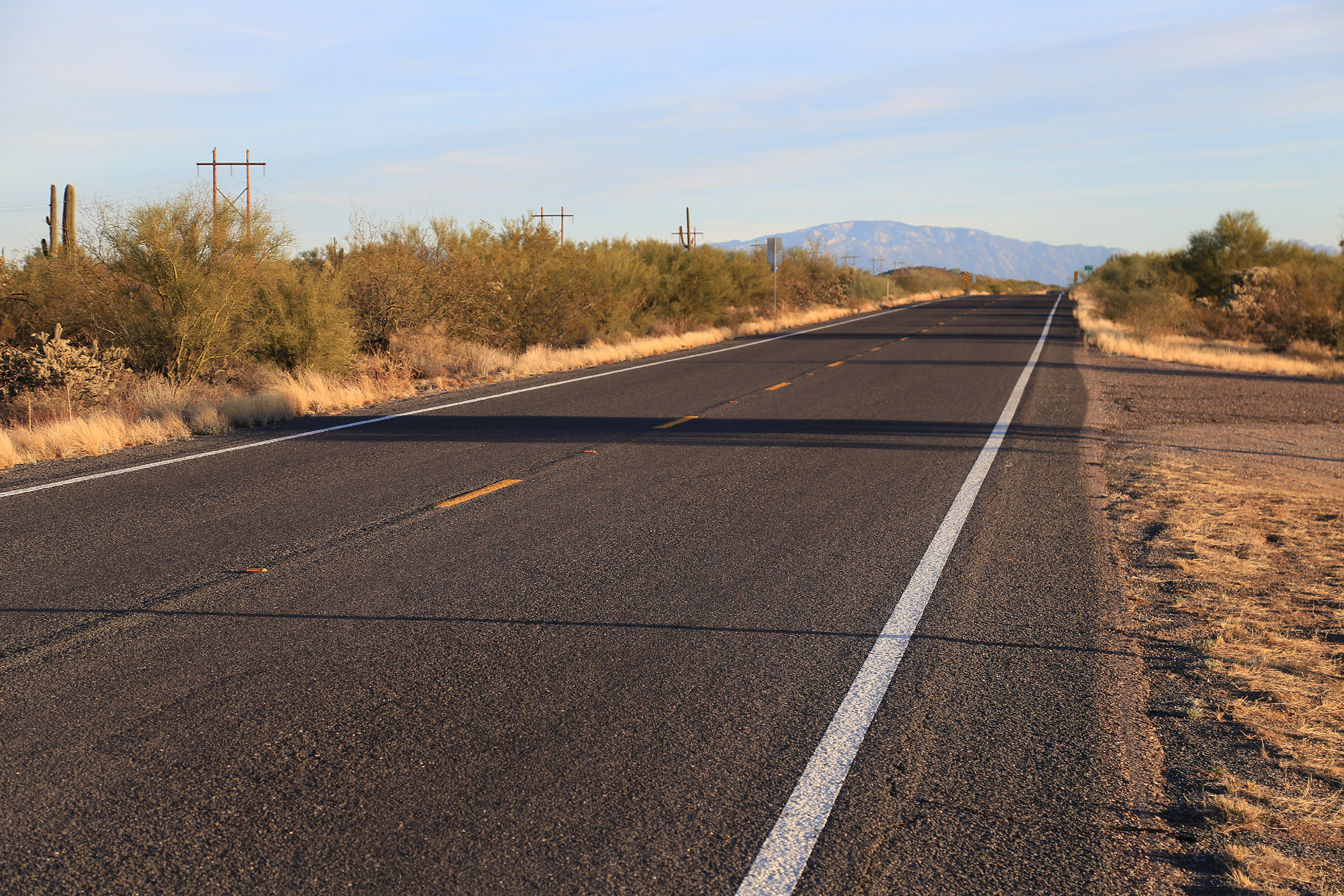
SR 79 Arizona, near Tom Mix Memorial with Mount Lemmon in distance

SR 79 begins at an intersection with State Route 77 in the unincorporated locality of Oracle Junction. From this point, it heads northwest through state owned land plentiful with Saguaro cacti on either side of the highway. The southern portion of SR 79 from Oracle Junction to just south of Florence is designated Pinal Pioneer Parkway, a scenic road of the high desert plain with views of the Santa Catalina and Tortilla Mountains. This stretch of road was so designated by the Arizona State Highway Department on January 10, 1961. The first 40 miles of SR 79 is mostly uninhabited wilderness, with only a handful of small ranching communities siding the highway on occasion. Around 11 miles (18 km) north of SR 77, SR 79 crosses Olsen Wash and passes the Cadillac Chaparral Restaurants, one of the few notable man made features on this stretch of highway. North of Foreman Wash, the terrain becomes relatively flat and fairly featureless. SR 79 from this point on becomes a straight highway with no curves or turns. 24 miles (39 km) north of Oracle Junction, the highway passes the Tom Mix Memorial, located on the west side of the highway. This is where popular western actor Tom Mix died after his Cord 812 convertible crashed into what is now designated the Tom Mix Wash while bridge construction was incomplete. The single-car high-speed accident led to his death after leaving the Oracle Junction Inn in 1940.

SR 79 curves again at the outskirts of Florence, crossing over the Central Arizona Project and Florence–Casa Grande Canal, before arriving at an intersection with SR 79 Business. SR 79 continues north skirting the eastern edge of town on Pinal Parkway Avenue, meeting both SR 79 Business and SR 287 at Butte Street. This intersection acts as the eastern terminus of SR 287, which provides a direct connection to the city of Casa Grande, SR 87 and Interstate 10. Within the vicinity of Florence, SR 79 services several State, County, Private and Federal Prisons as well as the main offices and courthouses of Pinal County. Directly north of Florence, SR 79 crosses the Gila River and intersects with the eastern terminus of Hunt Highway. The highway then curves northeast through the Florence Military Reservation. After crossing the tracks of the abandoned Magma Arizona Railroad, SR 79 arrives at a diamond interchange with U.S. Route 60 Exit 212. SR 79 continues for a short distance north of the interchange before ending at El Camino Viejo (old US 60) at the unincorporated locality of Florence Junction.

The entirety of SR 79 is a direct surface route, roughly paralleling I-10 and serving as the main route through Florence. Florence is the county seat of Pinal County and formerly served the Silver King Mine. Although Florence is not accessible by Interstate, it can be reached by I-10 traffic from SR 287 and SR 87 via Casa Grande and Coolidge. Florence is also accessible from the Phoenix Metropolitan Area by Hunt Highway. SR 79 also serves as a major back-road to the Phoenix and Tucson Metropolitan Areas with control cities along this route showing either Phoenix or Tucson. Though SR 79 does not go to either city, direct connections to both Phoenix and Tucson are provided by SR 77 and US 60. Most of SR 79 is a segment of Historic U.S. Route 80, save for a small section through Florence, where it follows SR 79 Business instead. According to INRIX (a traffic-monitoring agency). SR 79 as of 2011 was the fastest road in the nation, with the fastest 5% of the vehicles using it clocked at an average speed of 88 miles per hour.

== History ==
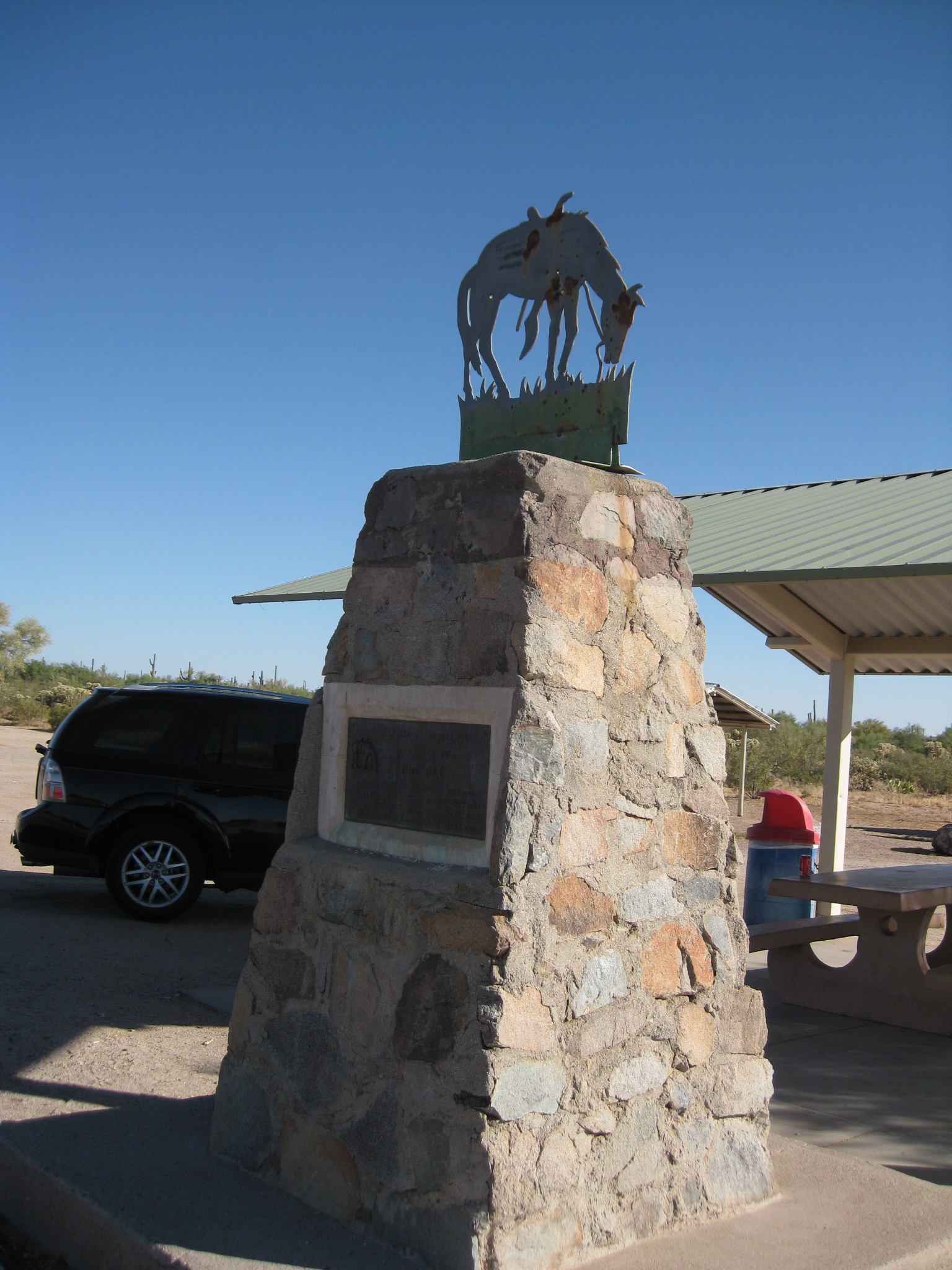
Tom Mix memorial near Florence, Arizona (32°49′17.4″N 111°12′12.5″W), the site of his death

SR 79 is a former section of both U.S. Route 80 and U.S. Route 89. Both highways were originally designated along this highway on November 11, 1926. US 80 was the main highway across the southern half of the United States between San Diego, California and Savannah, Georgia, while US 89 was the main north–south highway in Arizona, connecting the cities of Tucson, Phoenix and Flagstaff with Mexico and Utah. On the afternoon of October 12, 1940, silent film actor Tom Mix died in a car accident on US 80/US 89 18.5 miles southeast of Florence, Arizona. The entire highway between Florence Junction and Oracle Junction remained completely unpaved until 1946, and was the last section of US 80 in the entire state to receive pavement. The US 80 designation was decommissioned from this road in 1977, when the highway was removed between Yuma and Benson. The remainder of US 80 was decommissioned in Arizona on October 6, 1989. The highway remained part of US 89 until August 21, 1992, when the designation was truncated to Flagstaff. SR 79 was designated as a segment of Historic U.S. Route 80 by the Arizona Department of Transportation in September 2018.

Although the current route has existed since 1992, the SR 79 designation was used by two other highways between 1927 and 1993. The original SR 79 was designated on September 9, 1927, as part of the original state highways from Prescott to Jerome. By 1928, it extended northeast to Flagstaff. By 1941, this route was redesignated as U.S. Route 89A. In 1950, SR 79 was redesignated from Camp Verde to SR 69 at Cordes Junction. Between 1955 and 1964, SR 79 was extended to US 89A south of Flagstaff. SR 79 was extended north to US 66 in 1964. The second incarnation of SR 79 was decommissioned on March 19, 1993.

== Junction list ==
The entire route is in Pinal County.

Location	mi (Note: The mileage reflects the official ADOT mileposts along SR 79 and SR 79 Business, which are based on former US 89. Milepost 0.00 was on US 89 (now I-19 BL) at the United States–Mexico border in Nogales.)	km	Destinations	Notes
Oracle Junction	91.14	146.68	SR 77 / Historic US 80 east – Globe, Oro Valley, Tucson	Southern terminus; southern end of Historic US 80 concurrency
	132.27	212.87	SR 79 Bus. north / Historic US 80 west to SR 287 – Coolidge	Northern end of Historic US 80 concurrency
Florence	134.01	215.67	SR 79 Bus. south / Historic US 80 east to SR 287 (Butte Ave)	Southern end of Historic US 80 concurrency
Florence	136.03	218.92	Hunt Highway west	Eastern terminus of Hunt Highway
Florence Junction	150.01– 150.14	241.42– 241.63	Historic US 80 west / US 60 – Phoenix, Globe	Northern end of Historic US 80 concurrency; interchange; US 60 exit 212
Florence Junction	150.28	241.85	El Camino Viejo	Northern terminus; former US 60/US 70/US 80 west and former US 89 north
1.000 mi = 1.609 km; 1.000 km = 0.621 mi: Concurrency terminus

== SR 79 Business ==
State Business Route 79
- Location: Florence
- Length: 1.99 mi (3.20 km)
- Existed: 1992–present

State Business Route 79 (SR 79 Bus.) is a business loop in central Arizona. It lies entirely within the town limits of Florence located in Pinal County. This route used to be designated as both US 80 Business and US 89 Business. SR 79 Business is also the only active business route of a state route in Arizona.

The road begins south of town at its parent State Route 79 near the Central Arizona Project canal and travels northbound on Main Street passing a "Y" junction with State Route 287 to Coolidge. The road continues northbound to an intersection with Butte Ave, at a traffic light, where the highway turns east and passes the Pinal County Governmental Complex, it terminates at the junction with State Route 79 at the intersection of Butte Ave. and Pinal Parkway Avenue. It is the only state business loop in the state of Arizona. The junction with SR 287 and 79 is scheduled to be upgraded to a roundabout intersection. The current intersection has safety issues, including 8 driveways/entrance/exit points combining at different angles.

The business loop gives access to the historic downtown and business district in Florence, passing by the Pinal County Government Complex, Pinal County Historical Museum and 1891 Pinal County Courthouse.

Major intersections

The entire route is in Pinal County.

Location	mi	km	Destinations	Notes
	132.03	212.48	SR 79 / Historic US 80 east (Pinal Pioneer Parkway) – Phoenix, Tucson	Southern terminus; southern end of Historic US 80 concurrency
Florence	132.73– 132.74	213.61– 213.62	SR 287 west (Florence–Coolidge Highway) – Coolidge	Eastern terminus of SR 287
Florence	134.03	215.70	SR 79 / Historic US 80 west (Pinal Parkway Avenue) – Phoenix, Tucson	Northern terminus; northern end of Historic US 80 concurrency
1.000 mi = 1.609 km; 1.000 km = 0.621 mi: Concurrency terminus
