= San Manuel, Arizona =

CDP in Pinal County, Arizona

- CDP
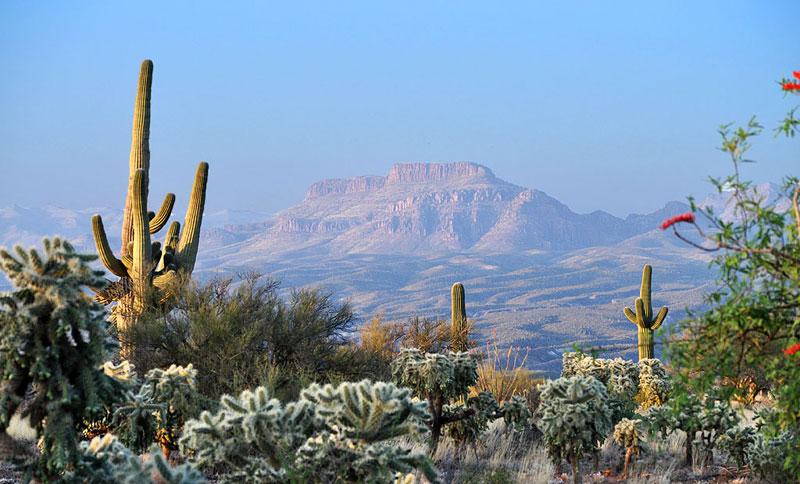
- A view from Redington Rd SE of San Manuel with Galiuro Mountains in background.
- Motto: "A Proud Past – An Epic Future"
- Location in Pinal County and the state of Arizona

- Location in the United States
- Coordinates: 32°36′18″N 110°38′0″W
- Country: United States
- State: Arizona
- County: Pinal

Area
  - Total: 20.75 sq mi (53.75 km^{2})
  - Land: 20.75 sq mi (53.75 km^{2})
  - Water: 0 sq mi (0.00 km^{2})
- Elevation: 3,451 ft (1,052 m)

Population (2020)
  - Total: 3,114
  - Density: 150.0/sq mi (57.93/km^{2})
- Time zone: UTC-7 (MST (no DST))
- ZIP code: 85631
- Area code: 520
- FIPS code: 04-63540
- GNIS feature ID: 34022

San Manuel is a census-designated place (CDP) in Pinal County, Arizona, United States. The population was 3,551 at the 2010 census.

San Manuel was built in 1953 by Del E. Webb Construction Company as a company town to serve the then-new San Manuel copper mine, mill and smelter complex. In 1955 the San Manuel Arizona Railroad was built to connect with the Copper Basin Railway at Hayden. When copper prices fell in the late 1990s, BHP, the owner of the mine and smelter complex shuttered both operations in June 1999. The closing saw 2,500 people lose their jobs. The mine and smelter were permanently closed in 2003.

The community is on the edge of the Sonoran Desert with its saguaros and overlooks the San Pedro River valley and panoramic Galiuro Mountains. Today, San Manuel is a leisure destination popular for hunting, sightseeing, and is a hub for off-road adventure for dirt bikes, UTV's and ATV's. UTV. Several museums include a mining museum and a motorcycle museum. It is also a gateway city of The Arizona Trail. Nearby towns are Oracle and Mammoth. Both are within 10 mi (16 km) of San Manuel and make up a tri-community area.

== Geography ==
San Manuel is located at 32°36′18″N 110°38′0″W (32.605048, -110.633340), in the San Pedro River Valley at an elevation of about 3,500 feet (1,100 m). San Manuel is approximately 45 miles (72 km) northeast of Tucson.

According to the United States Census Bureau, the CDP has a total area of 20.9 sq mi (54 km^{2}) all land.

=== Climate ===
Climate data for San Manuel, Arizona (1991–2020)
Month	Jan	Feb	Mar	Apr	May	Jun	Jul	Aug	Sep	Oct	Nov	Dec	Year
Mean daily maximum °F (°C)	60.2 (15.7)	63.8 (17.7)	71.1 (21.7)	78.5 (25.8)	87.6 (30.9)	97.4 (36.3)	97.0 (36.1)	94.2 (34.6)	89.7 (32.1)	80.1 (26.7)	68.6 (20.3)	59.2 (15.1)	79.0 (26.1)
Daily mean °F (°C)	49.0 (9.4)	52.4 (11.3)	58.5 (14.7)	64.9 (18.3)	73.5 (23.1)	83.4 (28.6)	84.4 (29.1)	82.5 (28.1)	77.9 (25.5)	68.5 (20.3)	57.0 (13.9)	48.7 (9.3)	66.7 (19.3)
Mean daily minimum °F (°C)	37.8 (3.2)	40.9 (4.9)	45.8 (7.7)	51.3 (10.7)	59.3 (15.2)	69.3 (20.7)	71.7 (22.1)	70.7 (21.5)	66.0 (18.9)	56.9 (13.8)	45.4 (7.4)	38.2 (3.4)	54.4 (12.5)
Average precipitation inches (mm)	1.12 (28)	1.14 (29)	0.65 (17)	0.36 (9.1)	0.31 (7.9)	0.34 (8.6)	2.38 (60)	2.78 (71)	1.29 (33)	0.59 (15)	0.62 (16)	1.03 (26)	12.61 (320.6)
Average snowfall inches (cm)	0.3 (0.76)	0.1 (0.25)	0.1 (0.25)	0.1 (0.25)	0.0 (0.0)	0.0 (0.0)	0.0 (0.0)	0.0 (0.0)	0.0 (0.0)	0.0 (0.0)	0.0 (0.0)	0.1 (0.25)	0.7 (1.76)
Source: NOAA

== Highway access ==
The main road connecting San Manuel to the rest of the state is Veterans Memorial Boulevard, which runs in a northwest–southeast direction from San Pedro River Road to a grade–separated interchange with Arizona State Route 77. From 1962 to 1988, Veterans Memorial Boulevard was part of Arizona State Route 76. SR 76 served as a direct connection from San Manuel to SR 77, the San Manuel copper mine and ultimately the rest of the state.

In the early 1970s, construction started on an extension of SR 76 to Interstate 10 in Benson, called the Benson–Mammoth Highway. However, the highway was ultimately abandoned at the beginning of construction, with only two sections being completed near San Manuel and in Benson, respectively, along with an abandoned and unfinished highway grade. The unfinished grade still remains at the southern end of Veterans Memorial Boulevard, blocked by a permanent traffic barrier. SR 76 was later decommissioned as a state highway and handed to local jurisdictions for ownership and maintenance. Additionally, any land the state of Arizona had acquired for the Benson extension was sold off.

== Airport ==
San Manuel Airport – E77 known as San Manuel Ray Blair Airport is public and located 2 mi (3.2 km) NW of San Manuel, Arizona. It has one paved runway of 4,207 ft × 75 ft (1,282 m × 23 m) with lights and a paved taxiway.

== Local & area attractions ==
- JWJ Cycles, Motorcycle museum
- San Manuel Historical Museum, Mining history
- Arizona Trail, Located just west of San Manuel
- Peppersauce Cave, Primitive cave

== Events ==
- San Manuel Copper Classic, annual off-road motorcycle race in March hosted by The Trail Riders of Southern Arizona
- Copper Town Days, annual event in San Manuel the second Saturday in October with a car show, food and entertainment
- San Manuel Chili Cook-Off, music, games, vendors and taste testing
- Santa Catalina Weekend, bicycle races

== Demographics ==
Historical population
Census	Pop.	Note	%±
1960	4,524		—
1970	4,332		−4.2%
1980	5,443		25.6%
1990	4,009		−26.3%
2000	4,375		9.1%
2010	3,551		−18.8%
2020	3,114		−12.3%
U.S. Decennial Census

=== 2020 census ===
As of the 2020 census, San Manuel had a population of 3,114. The median age was 46.4 years. 22.0% of residents were under the age of 18 and 25.2% of residents were 65 years of age or older. For every 100 females there were 94.5 males, and for every 100 females age 18 and over there were 97.1 males age 18 and over.

0.0% of residents lived in urban areas, while 100.0% lived in rural areas.

There were 1,255 households in San Manuel, of which 24.2% had children under the age of 18 living in them. Of all households, 44.5% were married-couple households, 20.8% were households with a male householder and no spouse or partner present, and 26.4% were households with a female householder and no spouse or partner present. About 29.9% of all households were made up of individuals and 17.6% had someone living alone who was 65 years of age or older.

There were 1,462 housing units, of which 14.2% were vacant. The homeowner vacancy rate was 2.7% and the rental vacancy rate was 14.3%.

Racial composition as of the 2020 census
Race	Number	Percent
White	1,986	63.8%
Black or African American	21	0.7%
American Indian and Alaska Native	48	1.5%
Asian	11	0.4%
Native Hawaiian and Other Pacific Islander	5	0.2%
Some other race	404	13.0%
Two or more races	639	20.5%
Hispanic or Latino (of any race)	1,510	48.5%

=== 2000 census ===
As of the census of 2000, there were 4,375 people, 1,458 households, and 1,204 families residing in the CDP. The population density was 209.5 inhabitants per square mile (80.9/km^{2}). There were 1,832 housing units at an average density of 87.7 per square mile (33.9/km^{2}). The racial makeup of the CDP was 69.1% White, 0.4% Black or African American, 1.4% Native American, 0.3% Asian, 0.1% Pacific Islander, 24.8% from other races, and 4.0% from two or more races. 46.2% of the population were Hispanic or Latino of any race.

There were 1,458 households, out of which 43.1% had children under the age of 18 living with them, 66.3% were married couples living together, 10.6% had a female householder with no husband present, and 17.4% were non-families. 15.0% of all households were made up of individuals, and 6.7% had someone living alone who was 65 years of age or older. The average household size was 3.00 and the average family size was 3.31.

In the CDP, the population was spread out, with 32.6% under the age of 18, 8.8% from 18 to 24, 27.0% from 25 to 44, 21.1% from 45 to 64, and 10.5% who were 65 years of age or older. The median age was 32 years. For every 100 females, there were 102.5 males. For every 100 females age 18 and over, there were 98.1 males.

The median income for a household in the CDP was $40,019, and the median income for a family was $42,563. Males had a median income of $36,463 versus $21,304 for females. The per capita income for the CDP was $16,534. About 10.3% of families and 12.8% of the population were below the poverty line, including 18.4% of those under age 18 and 5.6% of those age 65 or over.

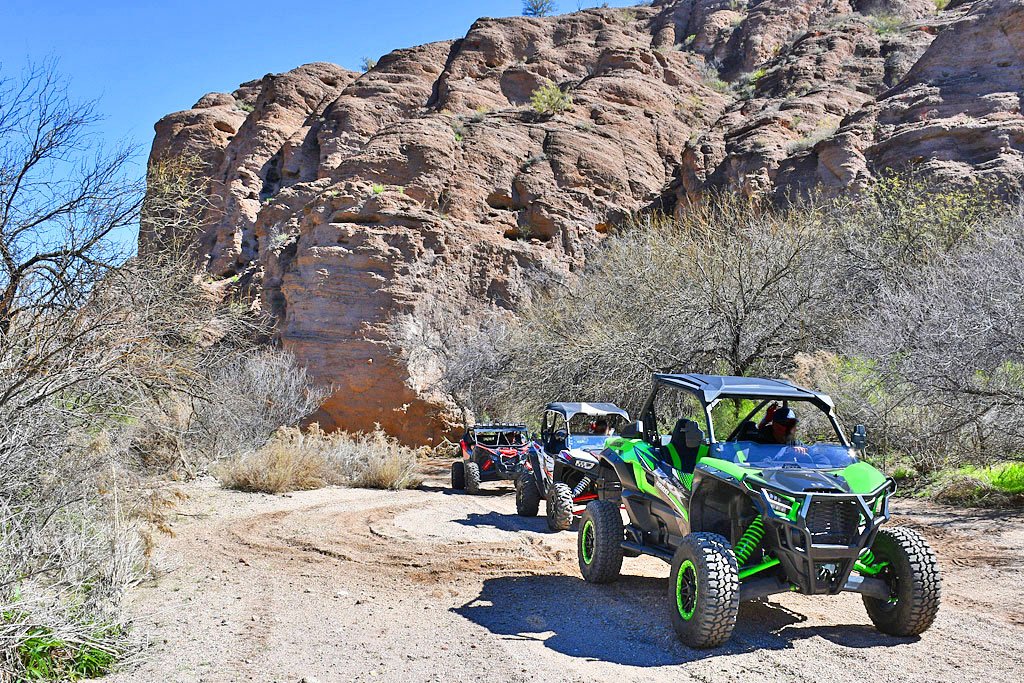
Off-road adventure with UTV's at San Manuel, Arizona.

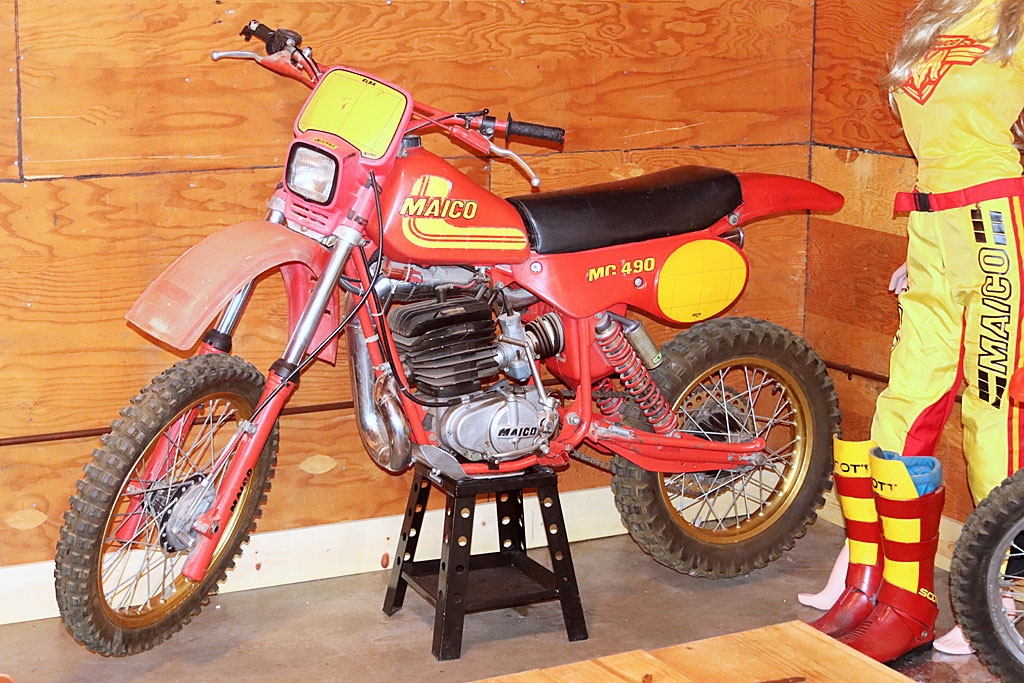
JWJ Cycles - Motorcycle museum in San Manuel, Arizona
