= Eulalia Bourne =

Pioneer Arizona schoolteacher (1882–1984)

Eulalia "Sister" Bourne
- Born: Eulalia Collins; December 23, 1892; West Texas
- Died: May 1, 1984 (aged 91); Mammoth, Arizona
- Known for: schoolteacher, rancher and writer

Eulalia "Sister" Bourne (Dec 23, 1892 – May 1, 1984) was a pioneer Arizona schoolteacher, rancher and writer. She taught at rural Arizona schools from 1914 to 1957.

== Biography ==
Eulalia Collins was born on a homestead in West Texas, the oldest of five girls. She was dubbed "Sister" by a younger sibling who couldn't pronounce Eulalia. Her family moved to the White Mountains in New Mexico, where she was raised with minimal education, with only three years of formal schooling. At seventeen, she married William S. Bourne, a prospector over twice her age. Between 1911 and 1914, the couple moved to Arizona. They divorced in 1915. Eulalia continued to use the surname Bourne after their divorce.

Bourne got her first teaching job in Beaver Creek in Arizona's Verde Valley though she was fired for dancing the One-Step, which was seen as vulgar by the community. Bourne's next teaching job was at Helvetia, a mining camp in the Santa Rita Mountains south of Tucson. None of her students spoke English, nor did Bourne speak Spanish. At that time, Arizona had a law forbidding the use of Spanish in school, but Bourne learned Spanish to connect with her students.

Bourne claimed that she had married Ernest John Dougherty, who died in 1919, though his death certificate lists him as single.

Bourne entered the University of Arizona in Tucson in 1920 as a "special student." It took her ten years to graduate, working her way through school, majoring in English with a minor in Spanish. She was unhappy with the city school system. While attending the school, she may have married again, though records are unclear.

After graduating summa cum laude, Bourne took a job in the isolated ranching community of Redington, where she taught a largely Mexican-American class. There she created The Little Cowpuncher, a mimeographed newspaper, written and illustrated by her students. It was begun, as Bourne later explained, as an effort “to hold the mirror up to life as we live it here.” The little paper and the mimeograph machine moved with her from school to school for the next 11 years: from Redington to Baboquívari then to Sierrita, Sasco, Sasabe, Sópori and back to Sasabe. With its lively, detailed descriptions of ranch and school life, it is now seen as a unique historical document of Southern Arizona ranching communities from 1932 to 1943, and is digitally archived by the University of Arizona. In 1941, the paper won a "Blue Ribbon" award from the Columbia Scholastic Press Association.

In her third year living in Redington, Bourne filed a claim on one of the last grazing homesteads in Pepper Sauce Canyon, which she called "Los Alisos." She initially lived in a tent, and later built an adobe house and acquired 50 head of cattle. She engaged in all the ranching activities, only occasionally hiring hands to help her. She found that many of the men who worked for her were disrespectful, and so only hired them when necessary.

In 1951, Bourne moved to GF Bar Ranch on Copper Creek, east of Mammoth. In 1957, she retired from teaching. She went on to write three books. Eulalia Bourne died on her ranch May 1, 1984 at 91 years of age.

"Sister Bourne was a complicated personality. She subscribed to The New Yorker magazine and was a member of the Arizona Cattlemen’s Association. She was a rancher who hated rodeos because she saw them as animal cruelty. She wouldn’t divulge her age or details of her private life, but freely offered her often unpopular opinions on the social and political questions of the day. She wore red lipstick and faded Levi’s. She was ahead of her time with her views on bilingualism in the classroom. She had many supporters, but some considered her a pain in the neck. From all reports, her students loved her and probably her cows did too. (She gave them all names: Vanilla Ice Cream, Dirty Face, Milagro, Old Rattlesnake.)"—Joan Sandin.

== Teaching philosophy ==
Bourne had some radical ideas for the time. Teachers were expected to work to assimilate Mexican-American students and track them for manual labor careers. However, Bourne rejected this idea, as can be seen through her creation of The Little Cowpuncher and her interviews and literature. Bourne also rejected the idea of only speaking English in the classroom, which was the state law at the time. In the late 1930's, she even produced a Spanish-language Christmas play. Bourne also believed that students should be paid to go to school.

== Honors and awards ==
- 1973-1974: Arizona Press Woman of the Year
- 1974: Norman Cousins Award from Society of Southwestern Writers
- 1975: Distinguished Citizen Award from the University of Arizona Alumni Association
- 1983: Outstanding Arizona Author
- 1987: Arizona Women's Hall of Fame
- 1996: National Cowgirl Museum Hall of Fame

== Books by Eulalia Bourne ==
- Woman in Levi's, University of Arizona Press, 1967. Online Version
- Nine Months Is a Year: Teaching at Baboquivari School. University of Arizona Press, 1969. Online Version
- Ranch Schoolteacher, University of Arizona Press, 1974.
- The Blue Colt, Flagstaff, Northland Press, 1979.
