= Oracle Junction, Arizona =

- Populated place
- Location within the state of Arizona Oracle Junction (the United States)
- Coordinates: 32°33′18″N 110°56′00″W
- Country: United States
- State: Arizona
- County: Pinal
- Elevation: 3,320 ft (1,012 m)
- Time zone: UTC-7 (Mountain (MST))
  - Summer (DST): UTC-7 (MST)
- Area code: 520
- FIPS code: 04-51320
- GNIS feature ID: 24547

Oracle Junction is a populated place and part of the SaddleBrooke designated census area in Pinal County, Arizona, United States, near the junction of Arizona State Routes 77 and 79 (formerly U.S. 89 until 1992). It is an estimated 3,320 feet (1,010 m) above sea level.

== History ==
Oracle Junction was originally a service station called Walnut Service Station, along the main road between Tucson and Phoenix. It was renamed Oracle Junction Service Station in 1926, and Oracle Junction developed in the area around it. During the 1930s the area hosted rodeos on Independence Day weekend.

The area had its own fire district, created in 1980.

On January 1, 1996, Oracle Junction Fire District merged with Catalina Fire District and Golder Ranch Fire District the three districts became a larger Golder Ranch Fire District.

As of the mid-1990s, the area has a mobile home park, a bakery, and two restaurants. The original service station closed. In 2022, there is only a small mobile home park and a restaurant.
