= Mammoth, Arizona =

Town in Pinal County, Arizona

Mammoth
- Town
- Mammoth, Arizona
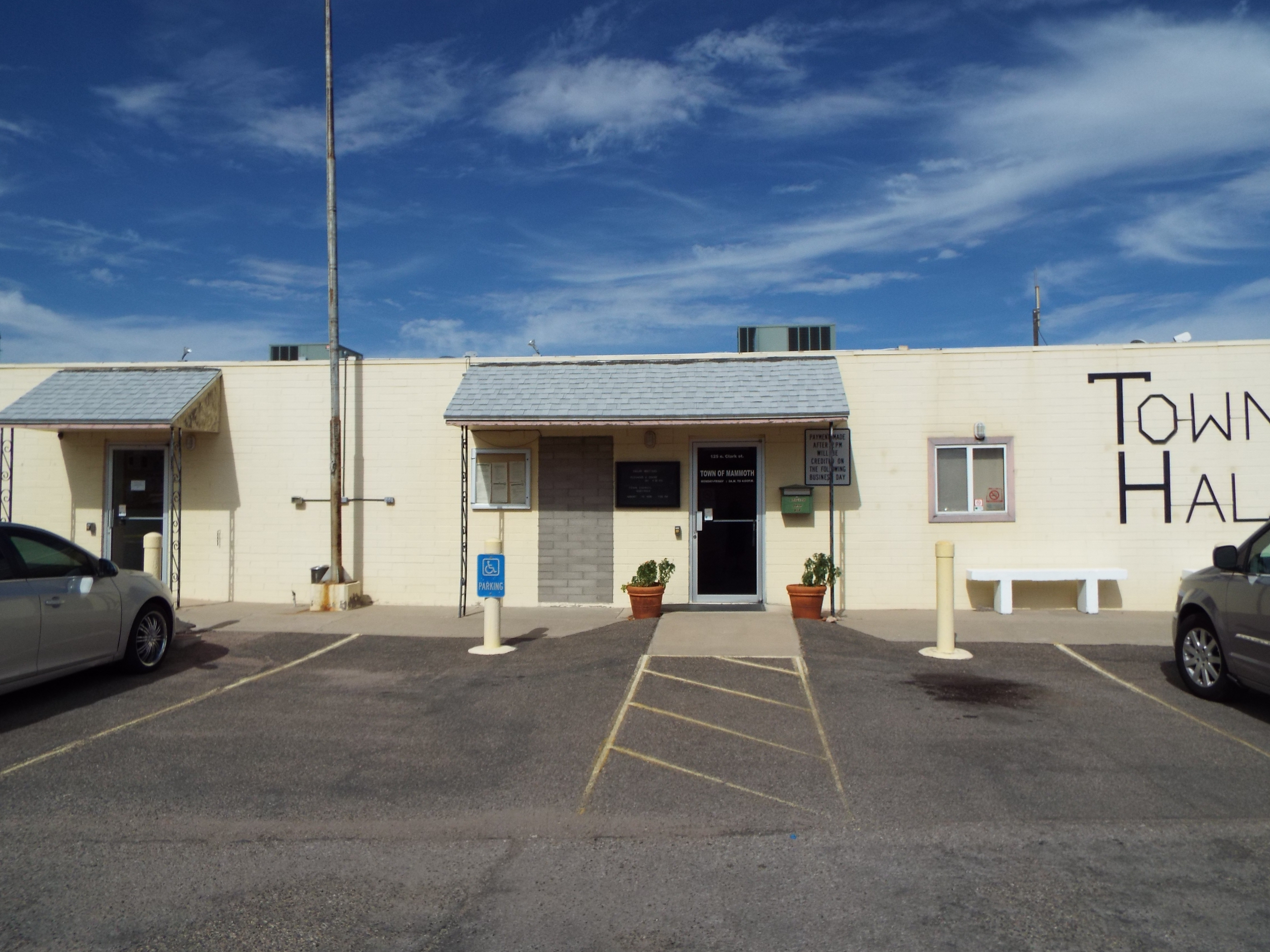
- Mammoth Town Hall

- Location of Mammoth in Pinal County, Arizona
- Coordinates: 32°43′20″N 110°38′39″W
- Country: United States
- State: Arizona
- County: Pinal
- Founded: c. 1872
- Incorporated: 1958

Area
  - Total: 26.32 sq mi (68.17 km^{2})
  - Land: 26.32 sq mi (68.17 km^{2})
  - Water: 0 sq mi (0.00 km^{2})
- Elevation: 2,359 ft (719 m)

Population (2020)
  - Total: 1,076
  - Density: 40.9/sq mi (15.78/km^{2})
- Time zone: UTC-7 (MST (no DST))
- ZIP code: 85618
- Area code: 520
- FIPS code: 04-43990
- GNIS feature ID: 7637
- Website: Town of Mammoth

Mammoth is a town in Pinal County, Arizona, United States. As of the 2020 census, the town had a population of 1,076.

== History ==
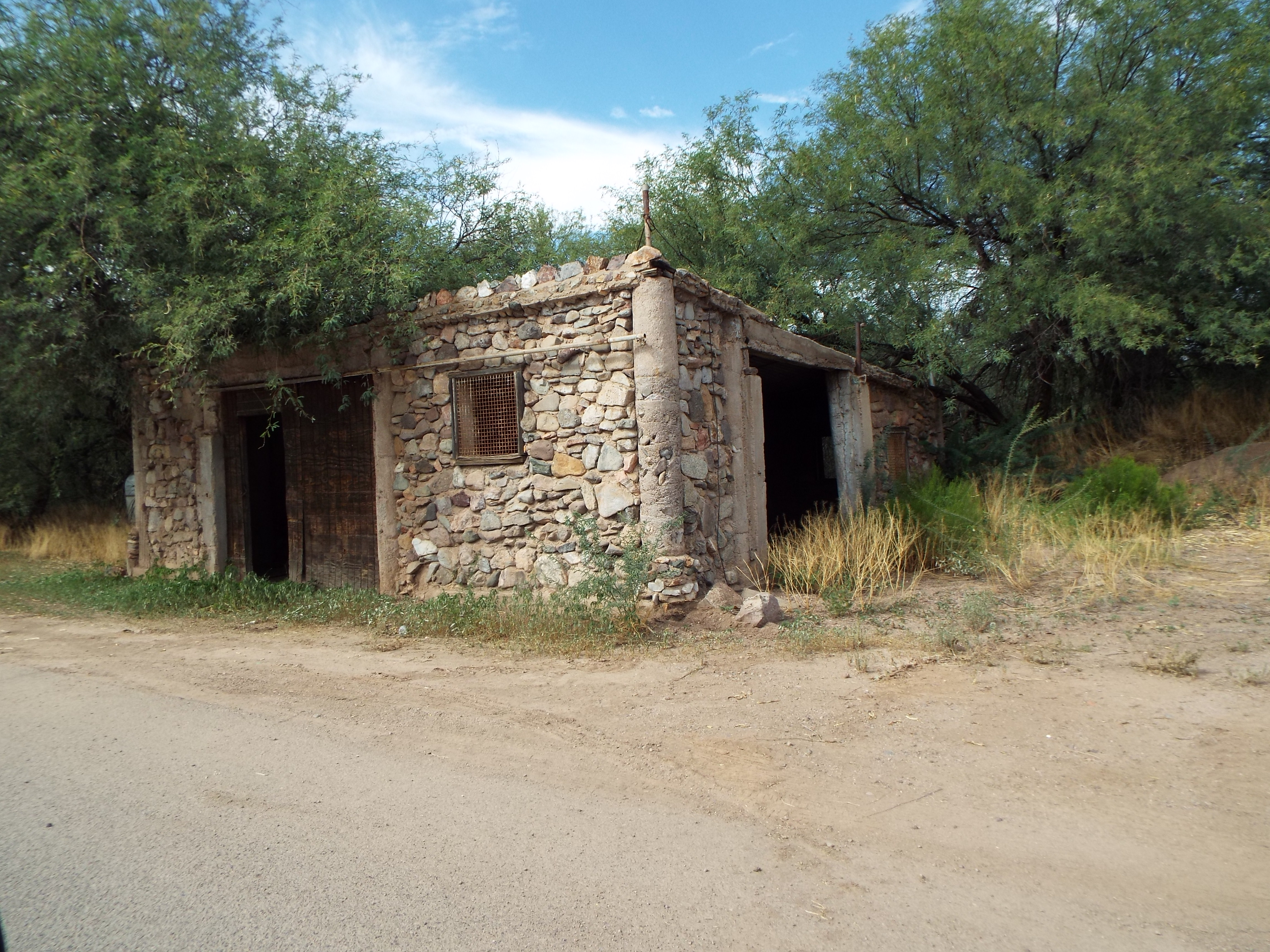
Ruins in Mammoth

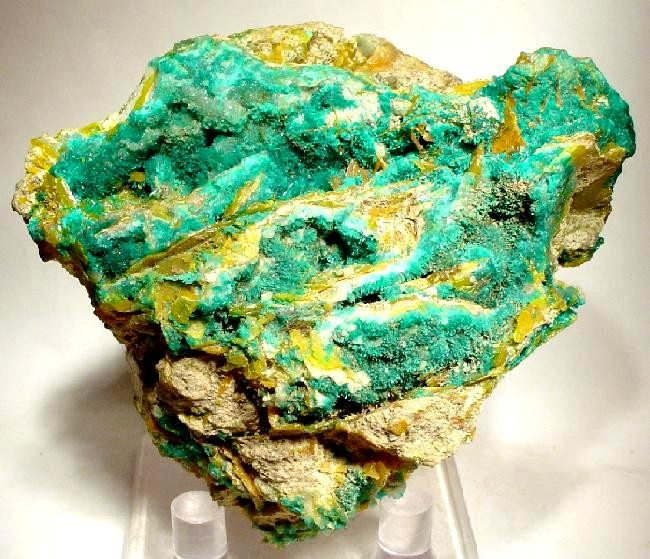
A specimen of dioptase and wulfenite from the old Mammoth-Saint Anthony Mine

Mammoth was founded around 1872 as Mammoth Camp to serve the nearby Mammoth Mine. Until 2003 when it closed, Mammoth served as a bedroom community for the nearby San Manuel Mine.

The nearby ghost town of Copper Creek is a popular local attraction.

Minerals from the old Mammoth-St. Anthony Mine are found in all major mineral collections. Tiger, Arizona was the townsite at the Tiger Mine and nothing remains of this ghost town.

In November 2014, Mammoth was the subject of a fictional horror tale on the Reddit subreddit "r/nosleep" in which a contagious disease wiped out the population. Naïve users believed and spread the story, somewhat akin to the 1938 War of the Worlds panic. The town was inundated with phone calls from people trying to ascertain what was happening.

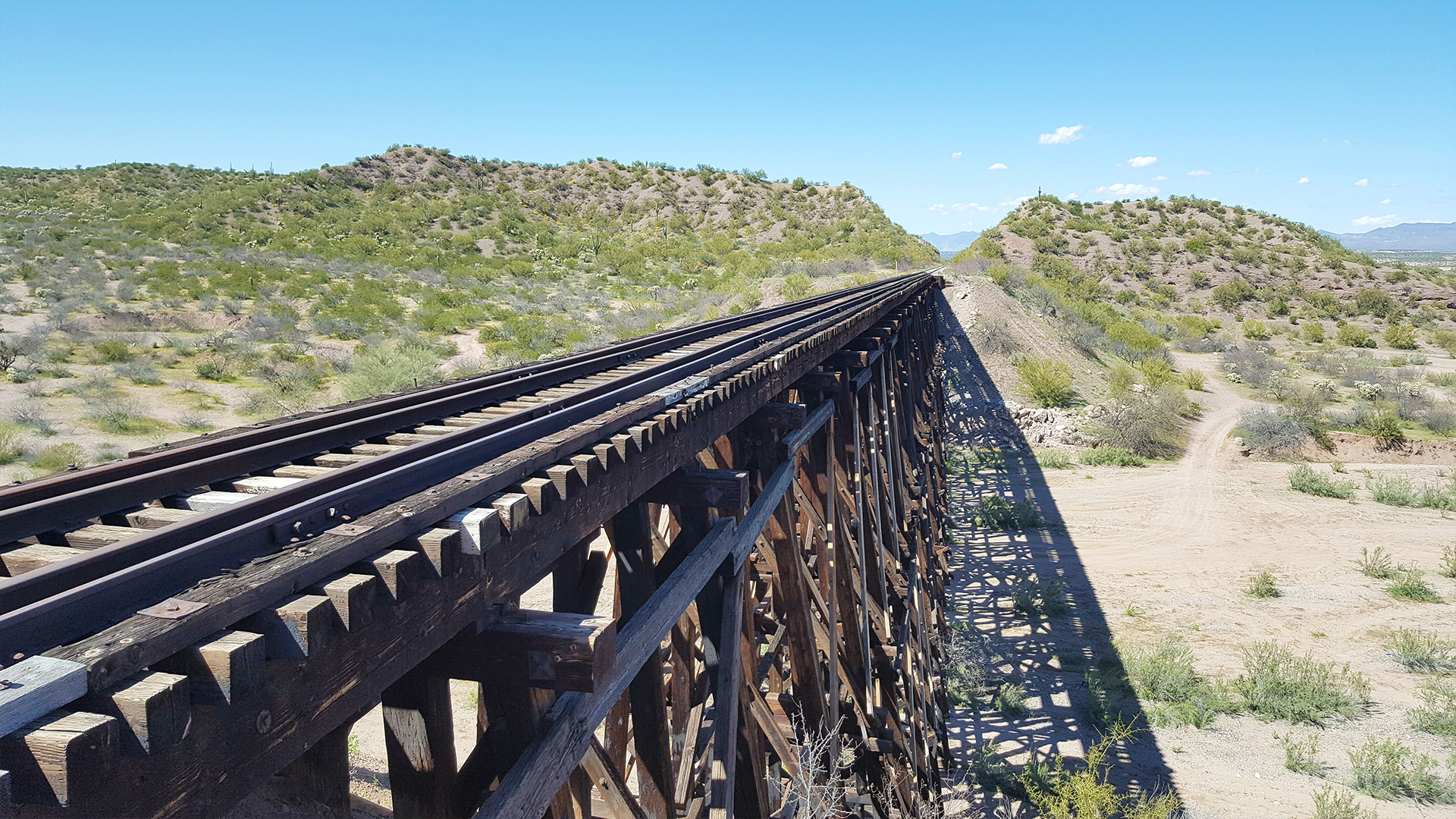
An abandoned railroad trestle in Mammoth, in March 2020

== Geography ==
According to the United States Census Bureau, the town has a total area of 1.1 square miles (2.8 km^{2}), all land.

=== Climate ===
According to the Köppen Climate Classification system, Mammoth has a semi-arid climate, abbreviated "BSk" on climate maps.

== Demographics ==
Historical population
Census	Pop.	Note	%±
1910	651		—
1920	324		−50.2%
1930	239		−26.2%
1960	1,913		—
1970	1,953		2.1%
1980	1,906		−2.4%
1990	1,845		−3.2%
2000	1,762		−4.5%
2010	1,426		−19.1%
2020	1,076		−24.5%
U.S. Decennial Census

=== 2020 census ===
As of the 2020 census, Mammoth had a population of 1,076. The median age was 47.8 years. 21.5% of residents were under the age of 18 and 24.6% of residents were 65 years of age or older. For every 100 females there were 105.3 males, and for every 100 females age 18 and over there were 102.6 males age 18 and over.

0.0% of residents lived in urban areas, while 100.0% lived in rural areas.

There were 423 households in Mammoth, of which 32.9% had children under the age of 18 living in them. Of all households, 45.9% were married-couple households, 20.6% were households with a male householder and no spouse or partner present, and 23.6% were households with a female householder and no spouse or partner present. About 18.6% of all households were made up of individuals and 10.4% had someone living alone who was 65 years of age or older.

There were 530 housing units, of which 20.2% were vacant. The homeowner vacancy rate was 0.3% and the rental vacancy rate was 3.8%.

Racial composition as of the 2020 census
Race	Number	Percent
White	572	53.2%
Black or African American	0	0.0%
American Indian and Alaska Native	38	3.5%
Asian	5	0.5%
Native Hawaiian and Other Pacific Islander	1	0.1%
Some other race	193	17.9%
Two or more races	267	24.8%
Hispanic or Latino (of any race)	752	69.9%

=== 2000 census ===
At the 2000 census, there were 1,762 people, 562 households, and 440 families in the town. The population density was 1,626.5 inhabitants per square mile (628.0/km^{2}). There were 697 housing units at an average density of 643.4 per square mile (248.4/km^{2}). The racial makeup of the town was 61.9% White, 0.1% Black or African American, 1.5% Native American, 0.3% Asian, 0.2% Pacific Islander, 31.9% from other races, and 4.0% from two or more races while 73.0% of the population were Hispanic or Latino of any race. Of the 562 households, 39.0% had children under the age of 18 living with them, 55.0% were married couples living together, 16.0% had a female householder with no husband present, and 21.7% were non-families. Another 18.5% of households had only one person and 9.8% had one person aged 65 or older. The average household size was 3.14 and the average family size was 3.54.

The age distribution was 33.5% under the age of 18, 8.9% from the age of 18 to 24, 25.8% from the age of 25 to 44, 20.1% from the age of 45 to 64, and 11.6% from the age of 65 or older. The median age was 32 years. For every 100 females, there were 97.8 males. For every 100 females age 18 and over, there were 95.3 males.

The median household income was $29,861 and the median family income was $32,661. Males had a median income of $32,768 versus $19,028 for females. The per capita income for the town was $9,878. About 23.8% of families and 28.1% of the population were below the poverty line, including 39.4% of those under the age of 18 and 10.6% of those aged 65 or over.

== Notable person ==
Eulalia "Sister" Bourne, who was an Arizona pioneer, schoolteacher and author, lived much of her life in the vicinity of Mammoth at her homestead in Peppersauce Canyon near San Manuel and later at her ranch on Copper Creek where she died in 1984.
