= San Manuel Airport =

Airport in Pinal County, Arizona

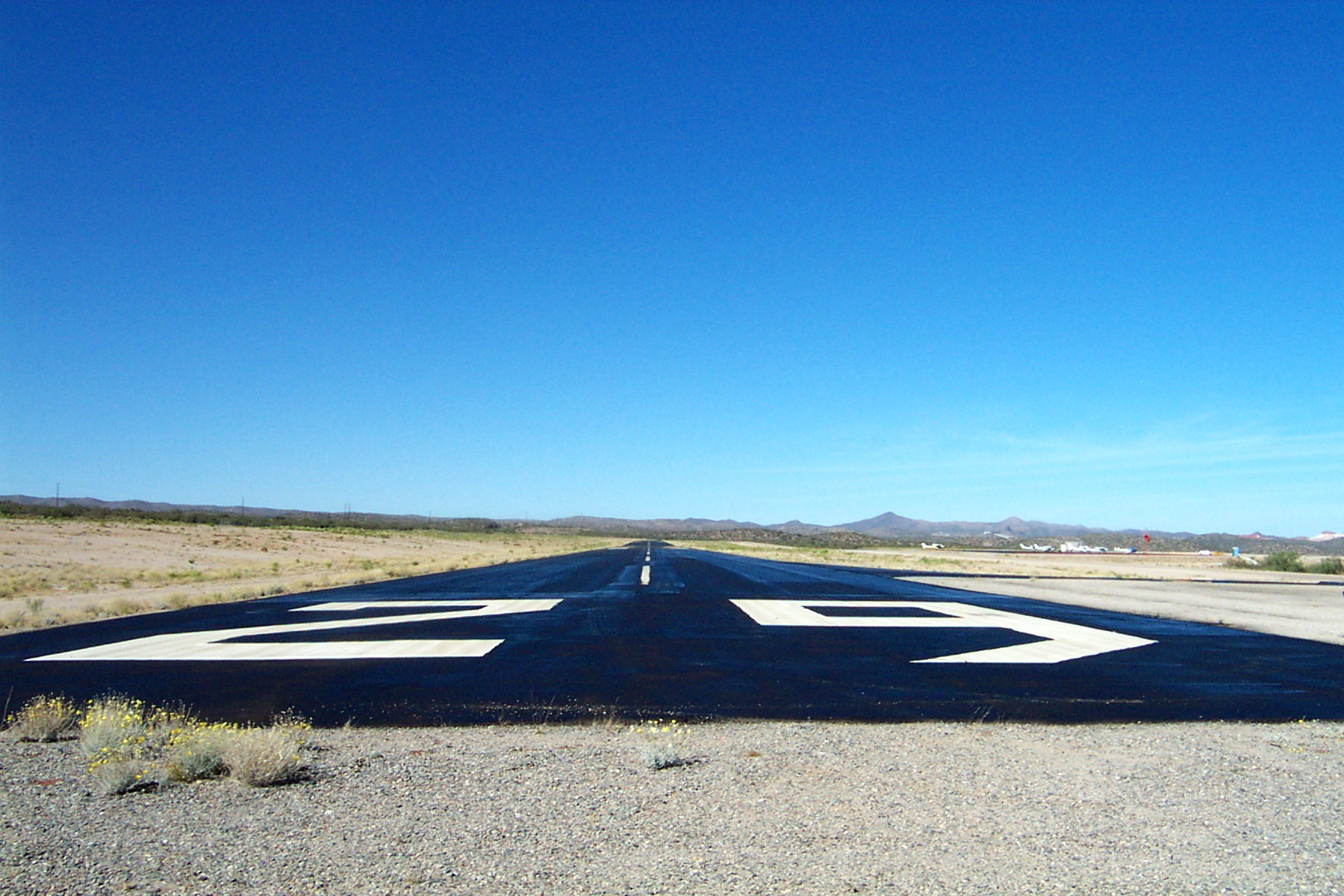
- IATA: none; ICAO: none; FAA LID: E77

Summary
- Airport type: Public
- Owner: BHP
- Operator: Pinal County, Arizona
- Serves: San Manuel, Arizona
- Elevation AMSL: 3,272 ft / 997 m
- Coordinates: 32°38′11″N 110°38′50″W

Map

Runways
Direction	Length		Surface
Direction	ft	m	Surface
11/29	4,207	1,282	Asphalt

Statistics (2017)
- Aircraft operations: 14,010
- Based aircraft: 20
- Source: Federal Aviation Administration

San Manuel Airport (FAA LID: E77), also known as San Manuel Ray Blair Airport, is a public-use airport located 2.3 miles (2.0 nmi; 3.7 km) northwest of the central business district] of San Manuel, a city in Pinal County, Arizona, United States. The airport is publicly owned by Pinal County. It was formerly owned by BHP, owners of the San Manuel Copper Mine. San Manuel Airport is 40 miles (35 nmi; 64 km) northeast of Tucson International Airport.

Although most U.S. airports use the same three-letter location identifier for the FAA, IATA, and ICAO San Manuel Airport is only assigned E77 by the FAA.

== Facilities and aircraft ==
San Manuel Airport covers an area of 54 acres (22 ha) at an elevation of 3,271.7 ft (997.2 m) above mean sea level. It has one runway with edge lights:

- 11/29 measuring 4,207 ft × 75 ft (1,282 m × 23 m), asphalt

For the 12-month period ending April 19, 2017, the airport had 14,010 aircraft operations, an average of 38 per day: 100% general aviation. At that time there were 20 aircraft based at this airport: 75% single-engine, 20% ultralight, no multi-engine, no jet, and 5% helicopters.

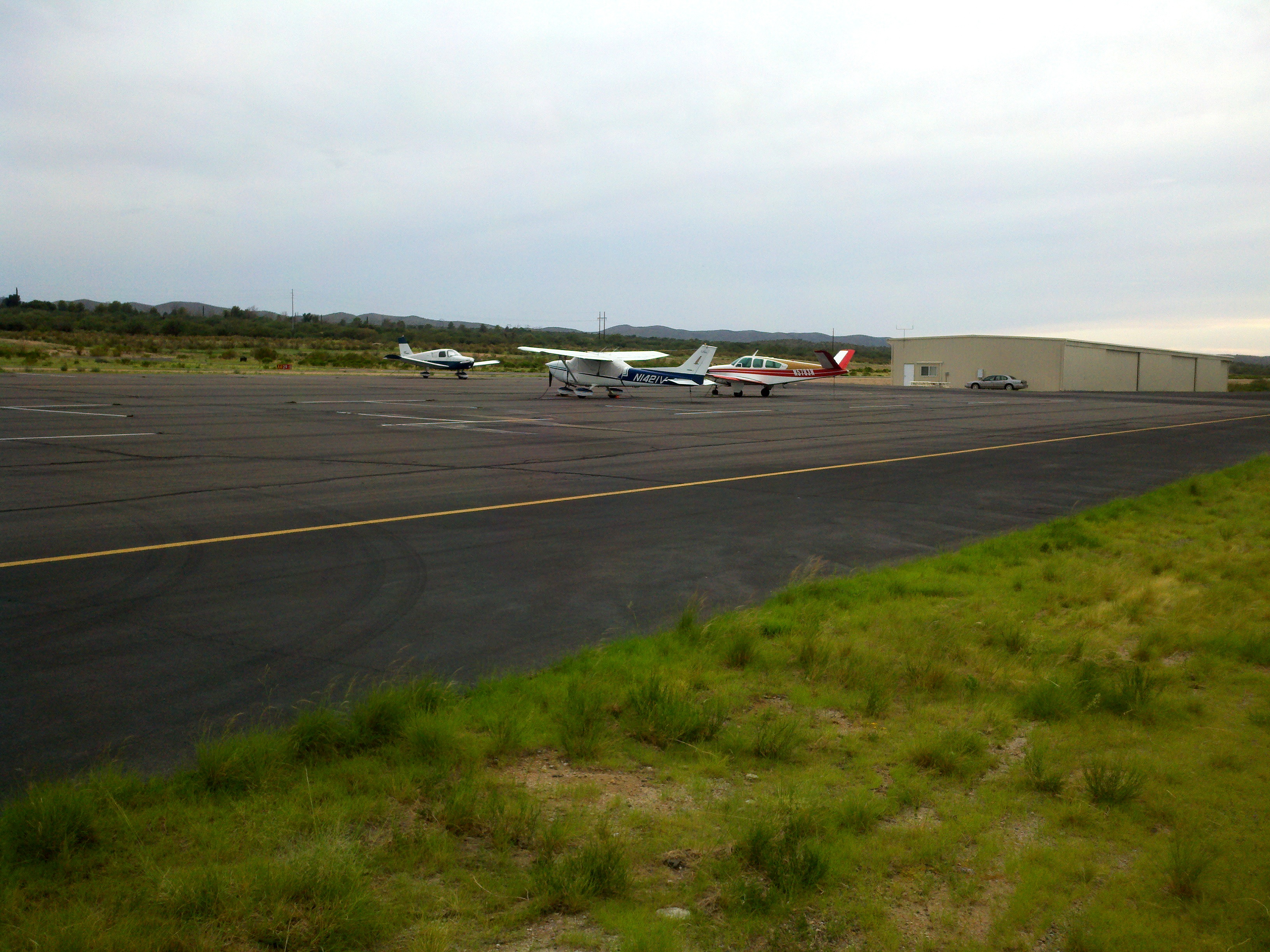

== See also ==
- List of airports in Arizona
