= Cascabel, Arizona =

- Rural community
- Location within Arizona Location within the United States
- Coordinates: 32°17′29″N 110°22′46″W
- Country: United States
- State: Arizona
- County: Cochise
- Elevation: 3,196 ft (974 m)
- Time zone: UTC-7 (MST (no DST))

Cascabel is a rural community in Cochise County, Arizona, United States.

It is located at 32.291N / 110.378W, on the banks of the San Pedro River, east of Tucson and about 37 km north-northwest of Benson.

The name Cascabel derives from Spanish for "rattle", because an early settler killed a large rattlesnake here. Cascabel was a small farming community. The post office was started by Alex Herron, a small ranch and store owner, in 1916. When deciding what to name the Cascabel post office, Herron, while on the way to Benson, met a Mexican man with a dead rattlesnake. Herron asked what the name of the snake was and the man replied "Cascabel." This was the name Herron decided to name the post office. The post office was in operation until 1936.
