= Redington, Arizona =

- Populated place
- Location within Arizona
- Coordinates: 32°25′39″N 110°29′35″W
- Country: United States
- State: Arizona
- County: Pima
- Elevation: 2,881 ft (878 m)
- Time zone: UTC-7 (MST (no DST))

Redington is a populated place in Pima County, Arizona, United States.

It is located on the banks of the San Pedro River, northeast of Tucson and approximately 54 km north-northwest of Benson. The area was previously known as Tres Alamos.

Redington Pass is a significant geographic feature northeast of Tucson. Redington Road goes through the pass, from Tucson to Redington.

== History ==
The Redington area was first settled by Henry and Lem Redfield in 1875. The Redfields petitioned to establish a post office named after them, but the United States Postal Service wouldn't allow for an office to be named after a living person. Instead the brothers used the name Redington, and this name was subsequently used for the community, the pass, and the road. The Redington post office was open in 1879 with Henry Redfield as the postmaster. In 1883 Lem Redfield was lynched in Florence on suspicion of being involved with a stagecoach robbery near the brothers' Redington ranch.

In the 1880s the rancher William H. Bayless moved his operation into the San Pedro Valley. Over the next several years he bought up homesteads, ranches and other land. Drought in the 1890s caused many settlers in the valley to leave and Bayless acquired their land to build the 200,000-acre Carlink Ranch. The townsite with its general store, post office and school were located within the ranch.

== Notable person ==
Eulalia Bourne, pioneer schoolteacher, rancher and author, taught at the Redington school, 1930–33, where she began publishing her Little Cowpuncher student newspaper. She also wrote several books, including her most well known book, entitled Woman in Levis.
