= San Manuel Copper Mine =

Former mine in Pinal County, Arizona

Coordinates: 32°41′46″N 110°41′22″W

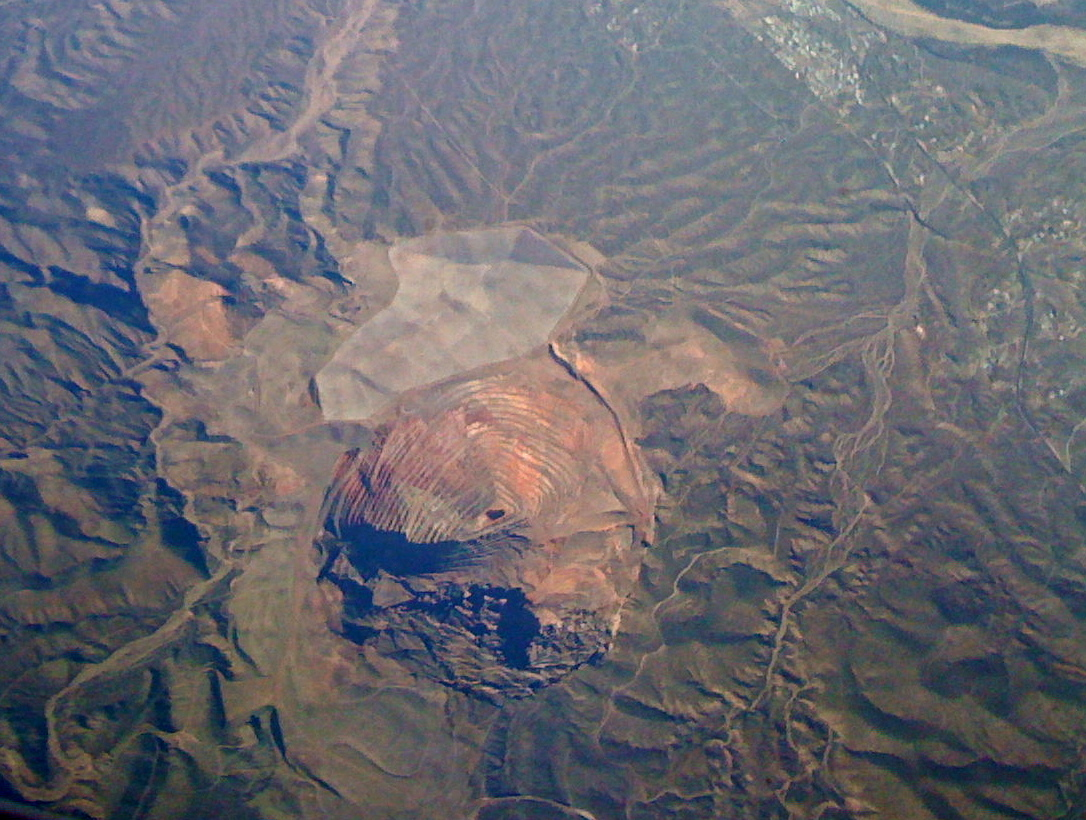
San Manuel copper mine site in 2009, after reclamation. The mine closed in 2003. The dry San Pedro River and part of the town are visible at top right.

The San Manuel Copper Mine was a surface and underground porphyry copper mine located in San Manuel, Pinal County, Arizona. Frank Schultz was the original discoverer, in 1879, but the main body of the deposits were discovered by Henry W. Nichols in 1942. The exploration drilling went on from 1943 to 1948, with the first mine shaft built 1948. Louis Lesser developed a mining city to service Nichols’ newly discovered deposits, and the development was completed about 1954. The first major production began in 1955. The mine and smelter were permanently closed in 2003.

== Geology ==
Faulting of the original ore body created two main segments, separated by an area of minor sulfides. The original ore body was cylindrical, but the San Manuel fault caused the division into two main parts, called the upper San Manuel ore body and the lower Kalamazoo ore body. The bodies are now separated by about 8,000 feet (2,400 m). The mineralized zone that contains the ore deposit is about 8,000 feet (2,400 m) to 9,000 feet (2,700 m) wide, and more than 9,300 feet (2,800 m) long, trending east-north-east. The mineralization is a porphyry copper deposit, with the ore body being tabular and 300 metres (980 ft) thick. The Kalamazoo ore body is U-shaped, with a depth of 1,140 metres (3,740 ft) to the top.

The mineralization is related to a Laramide monzonite porphyry stock and associated dikes which were intruded into existing Precambrian quartz monzonite body. Mineralization occurs within the Laramide intrusive and in the surrounding Precambrian porphyry.

The Kalamazoo portion of the deposit was discovered by an exploration drilling program based on the missing portion of the presumed symmetrical hydrothermal alteration/mineralization pattern of the San Manuel portion of the deposit. Geologist J. D. Lowell who directed the program for Quintana Minerals Corporation and John M. Guilbert went on to develop this work into a general pattern for porphyry copper deposit exploration.

== Operation ==
The mine was operated by the Magma Copper Company before being bought out by BHP, which ultimately closed it. Over 700,000,000 tons of ore were extracted using the block caving method. It was a large disseminated copper sulfide deposit mined with five shafts each over 3,000 feet (910 m) deep. Headframes are over 60 metres (200 ft) high. The operation of mining was divided into mining the hypogene sulfide mineralization (chalcopyrite) at depth and the shallow supergene (chalcocite) and oxidized deposit (chrysocolla, malachite, native copper and cuprite).

The entire site is now scheduled for reclamation.

== See also ==
- San Manuel Arizona Railroad
- Copper Basin Railway
