= Arizona State Route 587 =

State highway in Arizona, United States

State Route 587

Route information
- Maintained by ADOT
- Length: 6.10 mi (9.82 km)
- Existed: 1985–present

Major junctions
- South end: I-10 near Casa Blanca
- North end: SR 87 near Sun Lakes

Location
- Country: United States
- State: Arizona

Highway system
- Arizona State Highway System; Interstate; US; State; Scenic Proposed; Former
← SR 564	→ US 666

State Route 587, also known as SR 587, is a state highway in south-central Arizona that travels from its junction with State Route 87 just south of Sun Lakes directly south to Interstate 10 in Bapchule. The entire highway is just six miles (10 km) long, traveling entirely within the Gila River Indian Reservation, and serves as a shortcut from the far southern suburbs of the Phoenix metropolitan area to Interstate 10.

This highway was formerly part of State Route 387 and State Route 93.

== Route description ==
SR 587 is a 6.10-mile (9.82 km) highway connecting I-10 with SR 87 south of the Phoenix metropolitan area. The entire route is located within the Gila River Indian Reservation. The southern terminus of SR 587 is located at exit 175 of I-10 south of Sweetwater. The highway heads north from this interchange towards Chandler. It intersects with BIA Route 68 and BIA Route 60, along its route. The highway reaches its northern terminus at an intersection with SR 87 south of Chandler.

== History ==
The routing of SR 587 existed as early as 1938 as an improved road. The route was not part of the state highway system at this time. By 1951, this road became part of SR 387. By 1961, the route had become part of SR 93, a proposed extension of US 93. The route was redesignated to SR 587 on December 17, 1984 when SR 93 was removed from the state highway system.

== Junction list ==
The entire route is in Gila River Indian Community, Pinal County.

mi	km	Destinations	Notes
6.10	9.82	I-10 – Tucson, Phoenix	Southern terminus; exit 175 on I-10; road continues as Old Highway 93
0.00	0.00	SR 87 / Hunt Highway – Chandler, Coolidge	Northern terminus; road continues into Maricopa County as SR 87 north (Arizona Avenue / former SR 93 north)
1.000 mi = 1.609 km; 1.000 km = 0.621 mi
