= Arizona State Route 387 =

State highway in Arizona, United States

State Route 387
- SR 387 highlighted in red

Route information
- Maintained by ADOT
- Length: 15.71 mi (25.28 km)
- Existed: 1967–present

Major junctions
- South end: SR 84 in Casa Grande
- I-10 south of Sacaton
- North end: SR 87 west of Coolidge

Location
- Country: United States
- State: Arizona

Highway system
- Arizona State Highway System; Interstate; US; State; Scenic Proposed; Former
← SR 386	→ SR 389

State Route 387, also known as SR 387, is a state highway in south-central Arizona (United States) traveling from State Route 84 in Casa Grande, north to Interstate 10, then east to its junction with State Route 87 west of Coolidge.

== Route description ==
SR 387 is a 15.71-mile (25.28 km) highway that connects Casa Grande with I-10 and SR 87. The southern terminus of the highway is located at an intersection with SR 84 in Casa Grande. It heads north through the city from this intersection to the Gila River Indian Reservation before reaching I-10. After the interchange with I-10, the highway intersects SR 187, with SR 387 turning towards the east at the intersection. The highway continues to the east-northeast until it reaches its northern terminus at SR 87.

== History ==
The route was established between 1946 and 1951, from SR 187 to SR 87 just south of present-day Sun Lakes. Between 1958 and 1961, it was cancelled, and became part of SR 93, a proposed extension of US 93. In 1967, SR 387 was designated from SR 93 to SR 87. It extended south over part of SR 93 on December 17, 1984.

== Junction list ==
The entire route is in Pinal County.

Location	mi	km	Destinations	Notes
Casa Grande	0.00	0.00	Florence Boulevard to SR 287 east / I-10 – Historic Downtown SR 84 to I-8	Southern terminus
Gila River Indian Community	8.56	13.78	I-10 – Phoenix, Tucson	Exit 185 on I-10
Gila River Indian Community	8.79	14.15	SR 187 north – Sacaton	Southern terminus of SR 187
Gila River Indian Community	15.71	25.28	SR 87 – Chandler, Coolidge, Florence	Northern terminus
1.000 mi = 1.609 km; 1.000 km = 0.621 mi
