= Arizona State Route 83 =

State highway in Arizona, United States

State Route 83
- SR 83 highlighted in red

Route information
- Maintained by ADOT
- Length: 53.63 mi (86.31 km)
- Existed: 1927–present
- Tourist routes: Patagonia–Sonoita Scenic Road

Major junctions
- South end: Parker Canyon Lake
- SR 82 in Sonoita
- North end: I-10 in Vail

Location
- Country: United States
- State: Arizona

Highway system
- Arizona State Highway System; Interstate; US; State; Scenic Proposed; Former
← SR 82	→ SR 84

State Route 83 (SR 83) is a scenic state highway in southern Arizona, stretching from its junction with Interstate 10 near Vail south to Parker Canyon Lake. It passes through sparsely populated areas of Pima, Cochise and Santa Cruz Counties, passing through the wine towns of Sonoita and Elgin.

== Route description ==
The southern terminus of Route 83 is located at Parker Canyon Lake. It heads northwest from the lake and passes through Sonoita before it reaches a junction with SR 82. It continues to the north from this junction to its northern terminus at an interchange with I-10 near Vail, southeast of Tucson.

== Junction list ==
County	Location	mi	km	Destinations	Notes
Cochise	Parker Canyon Lake	0.00	0.00	West Coronado Trail – Nogales	Southern terminus; road continues west as Parker Canyon Road
Santa Cruz	Sonoita	28.19	45.37	SR 82 – Nogales, Tombstone	
Pima	Vail	53.63	86.31	I-10 – Tucson, El Paso	Northern terminus; exit 281 on I-10
1.000 mi = 1.609 km; 1.000 km = 0.621 mi
