= Arizona State Route 84 =

State highway in Arizona, United States

State Route 84
- Gila Bend Highway; Casa Grande-Picacho Highway
- Signed SR 84 highlighted in red Unsigned SR 84 highlighted in grey

Route information
- Maintained by ADOT, Pinal County, City of Casa Grande and City of Eloy
- Length: 40.94 mi (65.89 km) Includes the 22.87 mi (36.81 km) signed section and the 18.11 mi (29.15 km) unsigned section
- Existed: September 9, 1927–present
- History: Originally ran between Gila Bend and Tucson

Major junctions
- West end: I-8 west of Stanfield
- SR 347 near Stanfield; SR 287 / SR 387 in Casa Grande; I-10 in Arizola; SR 87 near Eloy
- East end: I-10 / SR 87 near Picacho

Main Section

Location
- Country: United States
- State: Arizona

Highway system
- Arizona State Highway System; Interstate; US; State; Scenic Proposed; Former
← SR 83	→ SR 84A

State Route 84, also known as SR 84, is a 41-mile (66 km) east–west highway in south-central Arizona, with its western terminus at Exit 151 of Interstate 8 and its eastern signed terminus at its junction with State Route 387 and State Route 287 in Casa Grande. An unsigned section, which is mostly maintained by local governments, runs from the SR 287 and SR 387 junction southeast through Arizola and Eloy. East of Eloy, SR 84 is concurrent with the beginning 0.87 miles (1.40 km) of State Route 87 just north of Interstate 10 near Picacho.

Formerly, SR 84 ran between Tucson and Gila Bend, serving as the primary route for travelers to San Diego, California and bypassing U.S. Route 80 through Phoenix. SR 84 was also part of the Broadway of America transcontinental highway in the mid-20th Century. It was mostly replaced by both I-10 and I-8 in the late 1960s and early 1970s.

== Route description ==
The western terminus of SR 84 is located at exit 151 on I-8 in southern Arizona. From this diamond interchange, it heads towards the northeast to an intersection with State Route 347 which heads north to Maricopa. SR 84 acts as the southern terminus of SR 347. SR 84 continues east from this intersection passing a large cattle farming facility, home to Shamrock Farms. Immediately east of the cattle farm, SR 84 enters Stanfield acting as the main street through town. Where the first few miles of SR 84 pass through mostly empty desert much of the landscape east of SR 347 comprises agricultural land. East of Stanfield, SR 84 crosses the southern edge of the Francisco Grande golf resort before crossing over a large irrigation canal on a bridge. Just east of the canal, SR 84 enters the outskirts of Casa Grande. SR 84 then proceeds to curve under the Union Pacific Railroad via a highway underpass. SR 84 reaches its signed eastern terminus at a junction with SR 287 (Pinal Avenue) and SR 387 (Florence Boulevard) in downtown Casa Grande at a traffic controlled intersection. Both SR 287 and SR 387 provide connections to Interstate 10 from SR 84's signed terminus.

Now unsigned for the rest of its length, SR 84 continues south on 2nd Street and Casa Grande Avenue. At a traffic circle with Main Street in downtown Casa Grande, unsigned SR 84 heads southeast on Jimmie Kerr Boulevard and Casa Grande-Picacho Highway. The route continues through Arizola past I-10 Exit 198 into Toltec and Eloy. Through Toltec and Eloy, the highway is called Frontier Street. As well as being unsigned, the section of SR 84 between Casa Grande and Eloy is locally maintained. Ownership and maintenance was handed over to Eloy, Casa Grande and Pinal County back in 1997. State maintenance of SR 84 starts again at the end of Casa Grande-Picacho Highway at an intersection with SR 87 near Eloy. Both routes continue south for less than a mile to Interstate 10 and share a common terminus at a recently reconstructed Exit 211. Like the Casa Grande to Eloy section of SR 84, the small state maintained and owned section between SR 87 and I-10 is also unsigned.

== History ==
Marker for the Lone Star Trail.

The first highway designated between Gila Bend and Tucson was the Lone Star Trail in 1925. This late auto trail utilized a route through Maricopa alongside the Southern Pacific Railroad between Gila Bend and Casa Grande. Part of the Lone Star Trail was designated as Arizona State Route 84 by the Arizona State Highway Department on September 9, 1927. Originally, SR 84 terminated at US 80 in Tucson in the east and SR 187 in Casa Grande in the west. In 1928, the western terminus of SR 84 was extended to US 80 in Gila Bend. Unlike the Lone Star Trail, SR 84 took a more direct route through the mountains south of Maricopa to reach Gila Bend. This westward extension allowed SR 84 to become a shortcut for US 80 traffic to bypass Phoenix while heading to and from San Diego, California. Starting in 1930, SR 84 also made up the Casa Grande to Tucson segment of the Broadway of America transcontinental highway, with SR 87 and US 80 forming the remainder of the route through Arizona. By 1935, all of SR 84 was paved.

An early highway shield used along SR 84.

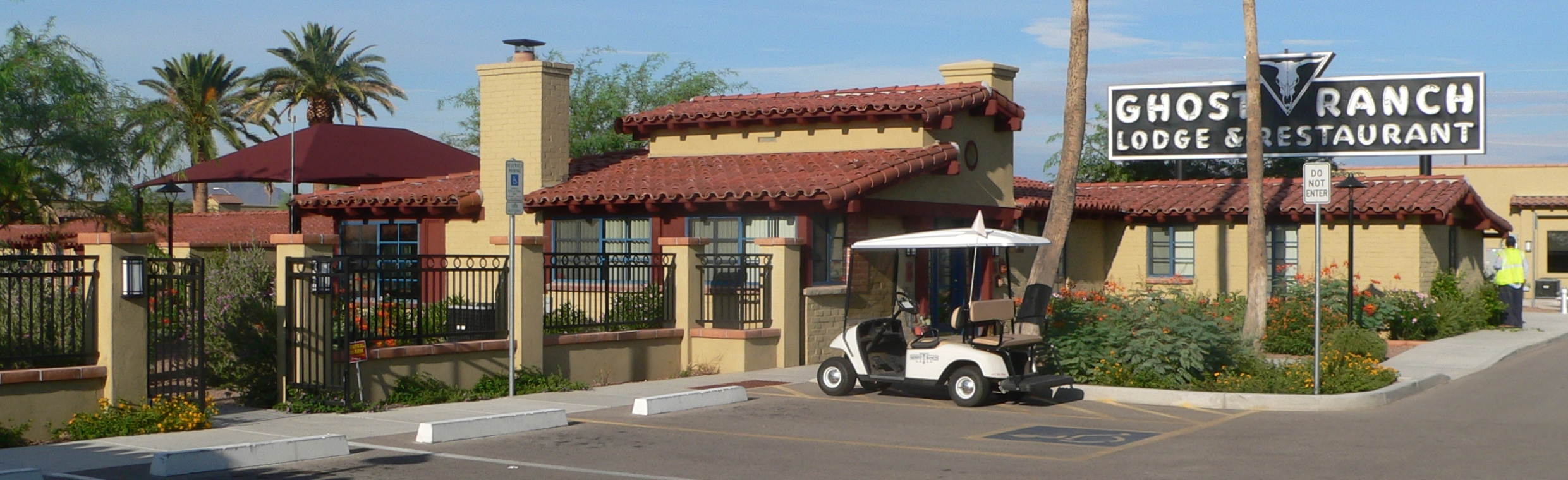
The Ghost Ranch Lodge & Restaurant, an old establishment along the Miracle Mile (former SR 84) in Tucson. SR 84 was the primary route used by US 80 traffic heading to San Diego, California.

In 1936, real estate developer Stanley Williamson proposed the idea of developing segments of Casa Grande Highway (which later became West Miracle Mile), Oracle Road and Drachman Street through Tucson into a large commercial area. Williamson's proposal was called Miracle Mile, inspired by the famous Miracle Mile in Los Angeles. Originally, Williamson thought of the name Parkway Boulevard but felt Miracle Mile better suited his new business area. Construction on Tucson's Miracle Mile started in 1937, with roadway improvements along Oracle Road (US 80 and US 89). The improved roadway was intended to handle large volumes of traffic safely and promote business growth, while also attracting national attention. Construction also included the placement of two giant traffic circles at Casa Grande Highway and Drachman Street. Both were built by the Tanner Construction Company. The initial construction of Miracle Mile cost $200,000. In 1937, the eastern terminus of SR 84 was extended southeast along Miracle Mile, US 80 and US 89 to the intersection of Benson Highway and 6th Avenue.

An incident involving SR 84 caused the state highway shield to be changed in 1941.

In 1940, SR 84 became the subject of cultural and political controversy. Two German tourists were observed by locals, giving the Nazi salute to an SR 84 reassurance marker along Miracle Mile in Tucson. Up to this point, the Arizona State Route shields sported a swastika inside an arrowhead below the highway number, which was meant to represent a Native American peace symbol. Careful observation by highway officials concluded the swastika in use was the incorrect design for the Native American mark, but unintentionally matched the symbol used by Nazi Germany. Upon the discovery, the Arizona Highway Department ordered immediate replacement of all state highway shields to avoid association with Adolf Hitler and the Nazi Party. Several motels in Tucson began construction the same year along Miracle Mile. After weathering through the tire and gas shortages of World War II, business exploded along Miracle Mile due to a postwar population boom in Arizona causing a high demand for motel rooms. Even more businesses and motels were constructed throughout the late 1940s. By the 1950s, Miracle Mile was a thriving business district with several iconic neon signed motels and restaurants.

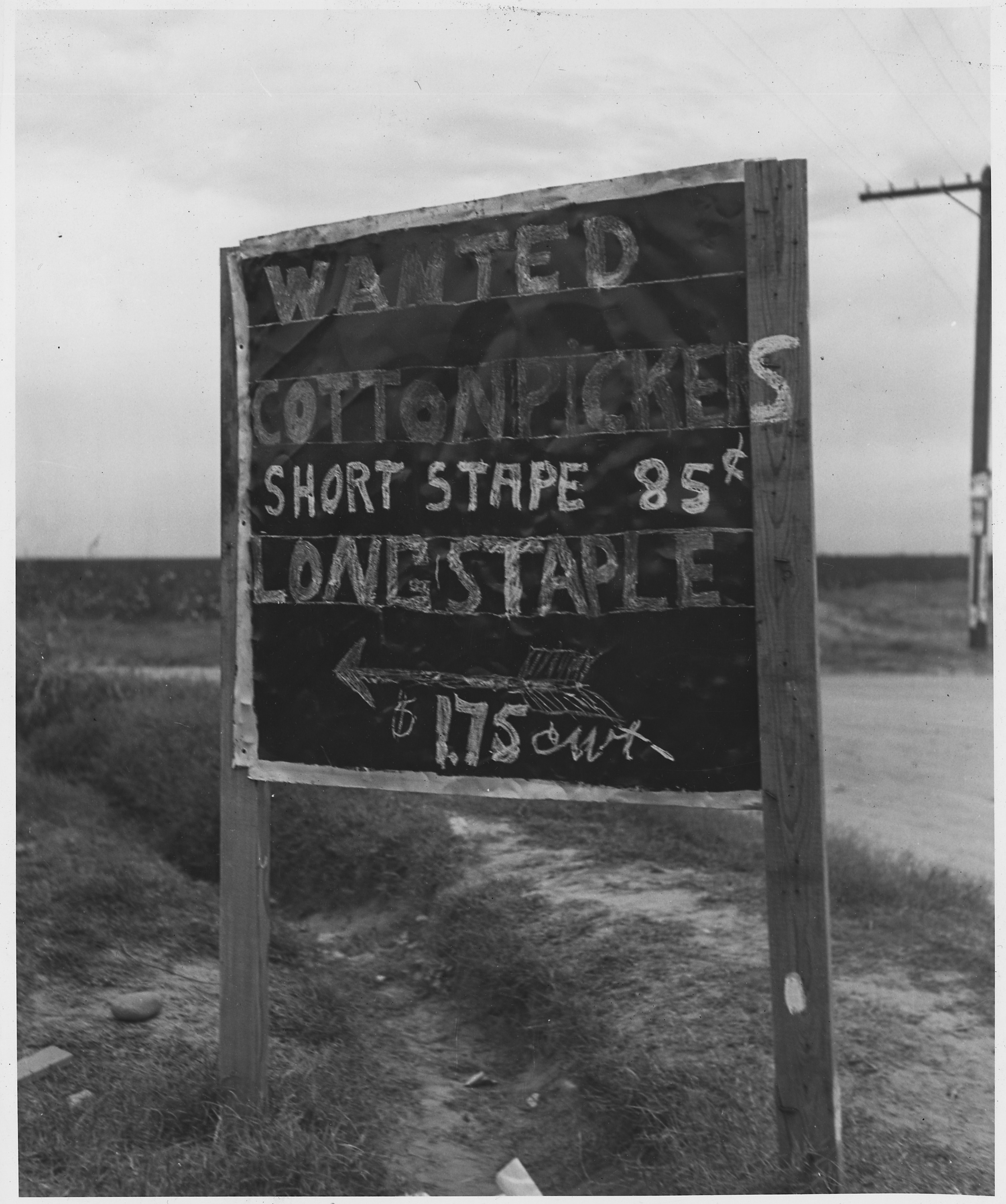
A help wanted sign on a cotton plantation meant to attract migrant workers travelling along SR 84 in 1940.

SR 84 as a whole grew to become a heavily traveled road. In 1940, more traffic was reported along SR 84 between Tucson and Gila Bend than on US 80. In 1948, construction of a new freeway bypass around Tucson was approved by the Arizona Highway Department. This highway would be called the Tucson Controlled Access Highway. Though it was a state highway, the initial construction cost was covered by the city of Tucson through passage of a city bond issue. The new highway was to be signed as State Route 84 Alternate (or SR 84A for short). SR 84A began construction on December 27, 1950. The Santa Cruz River was diverted into a man made channel away from SR 84A during construction to prevent the river from flooding the new highway in the future. The first section of SR 84A between Miracle Mile (SR 84) and Congress Street opened to traffic on December 20, 1951 with the second section under construction. At first, this road didn't have any interchanges south of Miracle Mile. By 1956 the bypass had been completed to a freeway grade interchange with Benson Highway (US 80) and 6th Avenue (US 80/US 89/SR 84), with a freeway interchange under construction with SR 84 at Miracle Mile. Within the same time frame, a concurrency was established between SR 84 and SR 93 between Tucson and Casa Grande. By 1958, large sections of SR 84 between Picacho and Tucson had been rebuilt into a four lane divided highway.

Between 1952 and 1955, the Highway 90 Association lobbied heavily within the state of Arizona to extend U.S. Route 90 west to San Diego from its terminus at US 80 in Van Horn, Texas. The proposed route laid forward by the Association would, enter near San Simon and exit at the California border in Yuma. US 90 would replace SR 84 between Tucson and Gila Bend, with the rest of the proposed route replacing SR 86 and being concurrent with US 80. The effort began to pay off as several road and highway commissions in Arizona approved the US 90 extension. The American Association of State Highway and Transportation Officials was set to make the ultimate decision regarding the proposed US 90 extension in December 1955. By 1956 however, the US 90 extension had not occurred, with SR 84, SR 86 and US 80 still comprising the direct route between New Mexico and Yuma.

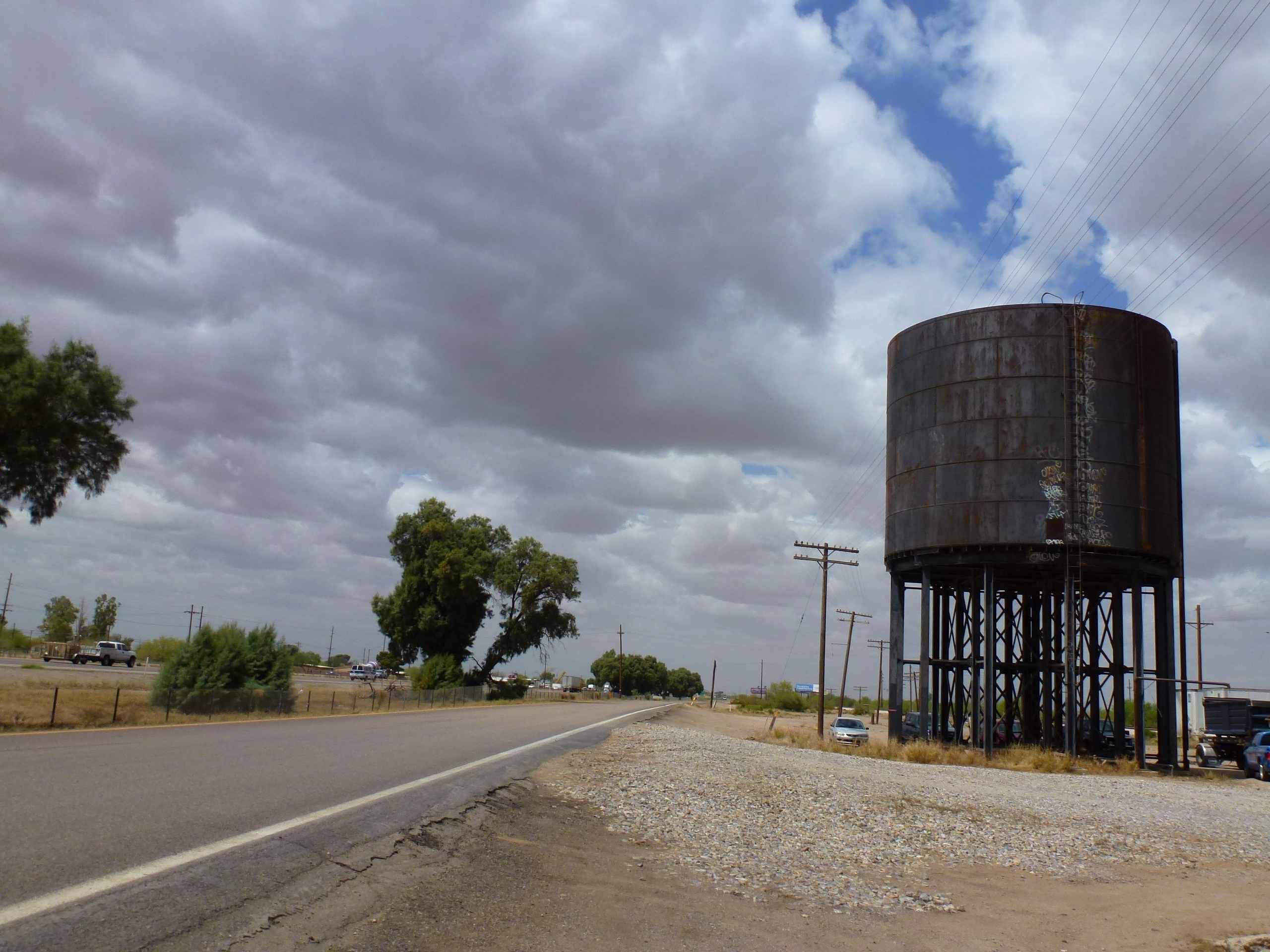
An old Southern Pacific Railroad water tank along former SR 84 (now the I-10 Frontage Road) in Rillito.

The popularity as a shortcut and high traffic levels along SR 84 ultimately lead to its decline as a major highway. In 1958, work was underway by the state of Arizona to make SR 84A part of the Interstate Highway System. Over the next few years, the road would be reconstructed to Interstate standards. In 1961, the construction was completed and SR 84A became a segment of Interstate 10. The SR 84A designation was retired two years later in favor of the I-10 designation. Between 1961 and 1962, SR 84 was reconstructed into I-10 from Miracle Mile to Picacho. Construction of I-10 through Marana resulted in its downtown area being demolished.

By 1963, work was underway to turn SR 84 west of Casa Grande into Interstate 8. In 1966, SR 84 was truncated to an interchange with SR 87 and I-10 in Picacho. By 1971, all of I-8 and I-10 between Gila Bend and Tucson was finished, with the only section of SR 84 not bypassed being between US 80 and the temporary end of the I-8 freeway on the east side of Gila Bend. In 1973, SR 84 was truncated in the west to its current terminus at Exit 151 of I-8 west of Casa Grande. I-8 replaced it from Casa Grande to Gila Bend. On October 17, 1997, a portion of SR 84 was given to local jurisdictions, between SR 87 near Eloy and downtown Casa Grande at SR 287 and SR 387. SR 84 still serves as the only east–west thoroughfare in Stanfield, Arizona, though it has been largely supplanted as a major road by I-8. Although the section between Casa Grande and I-10 near Picacho is no longer signed and is mostly maintained by local agencies, ADOT still considers said section as a part of SR 84.

== Junction list ==
The entire route is in Pinal County.

Location	mi (Note: The mileage reflects the official ADOT mileposts along SR 84. Milepost 0.00 is on I-8 at the California–Arizona state line in Yuma.)	km	Destinations	Notes
	155.10	249.61	I-8 – San Diego, Tucson	Western terminus
	160.86	258.88	SR 347 north (John Wayne Parkway) – Maricopa	Southern terminus of SR 347
Casa Grande	177.97	286.41	SR 387 north (Pinal Avenue) to I-10 west – Phoenix	ADOT signs this as eastern terminus; former SR 93 north; southern terminus of SR 387
Arizola	N/A (Note: SR 84 between Eloy and Casa Grande was handed over to local jurisdictions in 1997. There are no mileposts along this section.)		I-10 – Phoenix, Tucson	I-10 exit 198; SR 84 is not on I-10 exit signage and is instead signed as Jimmie Kerr Boulevard
Picacho	195.40	314.47	SR 87 north – Coolidge, Florence	West end of SR 87 concurrency; former SR 93 north
Picacho	195.89 115.40	315.25 185.72	SR 87 ends / I-10 – Tucson, Phoenix	Southern terminus of SR 87; east end of SR 87 concurrency; mileposts change to extend off of SR 87 mileage
	114.89	184.90	Phillips Road – Picacho	Eastern terminus
1.000 mi = 1.609 km; 1.000 km = 0.621 mi: Concurrency terminus

== See also ==
- U.S. Route 80 in Arizona
- U.S. Route 89 in Arizona
- Interstate 8 in Arizona
- Interstate 10 in Arizona
- Miracle Mile Historic District
