= Arizona State Route 386 =

State highway in Arizona, United States

State Route 386
- Kitt Peak Road
- SR 386 highlighted in red

Route information
- Maintained by ADOT
- Length: 11.88 mi (19.12 km)
- Existed: 1967–present
- Restrictions: Closed nightly from 4pm to 9am

Major junctions
- South end: Near Kitt Peak National Observatory
- North end: SR 86

Location
- Country: United States
- State: Arizona
- Counties: Pima

Highway system
- Arizona State Highway System; Interstate; US; State; Scenic Proposed; Former
← SR 377	→ SR 387

State Route 386, also known as SR 386, is a state highway in southern Arizona entirely within the Tohono O'odham Nation, traveling from State Route 86 to Kitt Peak National Observatory.

== Route description ==
SR 386 is a 11.88-mile (19.12 km) highway that connects the Kitt Peak National Observatory with SR 86. The southern terminus of the highway is located at the observatory. The highway leaves the observatory heading towards the southwest as it descends the mountain. It eventually begins to make the turn towards the west, then the north, and finally the northeast. The highway follows the terrain of the mountain and does not follow a direct route to SR 86. The highway makes a turn towards the north once the terrain smooths out as it heads towards its northern terminus at SR 86.

== History ==
SR 386 was established as a state highway in 1967. In 1986, the Arizona Department of Transportation acquired the right-of-way needed in order to widen the road. This improvement has yet to happen.

== Junction list ==
The entire route is in Tohono O'odham Indian Reservation, Pima County.

mi	km	Destinations	Notes
11.88	19.12	Kitt Peak Observatory	Southern terminus
0.00	0.00	SR 86 – Ajo, Tucson	Northern terminus
1.000 mi = 1.609 km; 1.000 km = 0.621 mi
