= Arizona State Route 187 =

State highway in Arizona, United States

State Route 187
- SR 187 highlighted in red

Route information
- Maintained by ADOT
- Length: 5.43 mi (8.74 km)
- Existed: 1944–present

Major junctions
- South end: SR 387 near Sacaton
- North end: SR 87 near Sacaton

Location
- Country: United States
- State: Arizona

Highway system
- Arizona State Highway System; Interstate; US; State; Scenic Proposed; Former
← SR 186	→ SR 188

State Route 187, also known as SR 187, is a state highway in south-central Arizona traveling from State Route 387 north of Casa Grande north to its junction with State Route 87 near Sacaton. The entire stretch of road runs in the Gila River Indian Reservation and is approximately 5 miles (8.0 km) long. It is a short-cut for traffic heading toward the southeast valley of Phoenix in case of an accident on westbound Interstate 10.

The stretch between Interstate 10 and Casa Grande was historically/originally part of SR 187; it is now part of SR 387.

== Route description ==
The southern terminus of SR 187 is located at an intersection with SR 387 northeast of the interchange between I-10 and SR 387. SR 187 heads northeast from this junction to an intersection with the Casa Grande Highway. It continues towards the northeast to its northern terminus at an intersection with SR 87.

== History ==
The route was established in 1927 by the Arizona Department of Transportation and originally ended at State Route 84 over a former portion of State Route 87, which was rerouted to the east. The road was improved several times until it was completely paved in 1966. Between 1958 and 1963, the section between SR 84 and SR 387 was transferred to SR 93, a proposed extension of US 93.

== Junction list ==
The entire route is in Pinal County.

Location	mi	km	Destinations	Notes
	0.00	0.00	SR 387 to I-10	Southern terminus; road continues as SR 387 south
Sacaton Flats	5.43	8.74	SR 87 / I-10 Alt. west – Chandler, Coolidge	Northern terminus; road continues as Olberg Road
1.000 mi = 1.609 km; 1.000 km = 0.621 mi
