= Arizona State Route 210 =

State highway in Arizona, United States

State Route 210
- Barraza-Aviation Parkway
- SR 210/Barraza-Aviation Parkway highlighted in red; Maclovio Barraza Parkway in blue; Future SR 210 in pink

Route information
- Maintained by ADOT
- Length: 3.96 mi (6.37 km)
- Existed: 1998–present

Major junctions
- West end: Broadway Boulevard in Tucson
- East end: Golf Links Road in Tucson

Location
- Country: United States
- State: Arizona

Highway system
- Arizona State Highway System; Interstate; US; State; Scenic Proposed; Former
| ← Loop 202 | → SR 238 |

State Route 210 (SR 210), also known as the Barraza-Aviation Parkway, is a state highway located in Tucson, Arizona, United States, alongside the Union Pacific railroad. Most of it was opened around 1998.

== Route description ==
Between its western terminus at Broadway Boulevard and Kino Parkway, SR 210 is a controlled-access expressway; farther east, it is a limited-access highway with at-grade intersections and traffic lights until its eastern terminus at Golf Links Road (at the western edge of Davis-Monthan Air Force Base).

SR 210 currently does not intersect any other state or national routes, but is planned to intersect Interstate 10 in the future.

== History ==
The initial section of SR 210 has a very long history in Tucson. Called the Barraza-Aviation Highway, all but the last few miles were completed in the 1990s. On July 8, 2008, the Mayor and Council voted 6–0 to approve Alignment 3.d., which would extend SR 210 to I-10 at the current St. Mary's Road overpass. As of 2023, nothing to this effect ever came to fruition.

According to historian David Leighton of the Arizona Daily Star newspaper, the name "Barraza" is named for union leader Maclovio R. Barraza and the word "Aviation" derives from the Aviation Field, now called Davis-Monthan Air Force Base.

== Future ==
=== Maclovio Barraza Parkway/Downtown Links Project ===
After the passage of the Regional Transportation Authority plan in 2006, a portion of the sales tax increase paid for an extension plan of the parkway from Broadway Boulevard to 6th Street called Downtown Links. The new road, called the Maclovio Barraza Parkway, would go alongside the Union Pacific Railroad. Also, the railroad crossing on 6th Street, west of Stone Avenue, will be improved, providing a new underpass above the railroad. This will allow direct access from I-10 to the new parkway via 6th Street.

The Maclovio Barraza Parkway is a 4 lane, 30 Mile per Hour roadway connecting Broadway Boulevard to 6th Street. Construction of the parkway began in August of 2020 in the second phase of the RTA plan. The new Maclovio Barraza Parkway opened to all traffic on February 17, 2023. The remaining western section of the Downtown Links project was planned to be completed in Summer of 2024. As of 2025, however, the 6th Street underpass is still under pre-construction. The final portion was opened to vehicular access in June 2026, several years behind schedule.

=== Southeastern Tucson extension ===
In 2011, ADOT started a study to connect SR 210 to I-10 at Alvernon Way in southeast Tucson. The new roadway would be built to freeway standards from I-10 to the current terminus at Golf Links Road. In December 2020, ADOT released final design concept report on the extension as part of the I-10 widening project. SR 210 will be extended to I-10 at the Alvernon Way interchange. The eastern terminus interchanges at Alvernon Way and Golf Links Road will be reconfigured into a single interchange. SR 210 will be extended southward as a freeway along the Alvernon Way right-of-way with an interchange at Ajo Way. The extension will be phases five, seven, eight, and nine of the 18 phase I-10 widening project, which is expected to cost $1.2 billion.

== Exit list ==
The entire route is in Pima County.

| Location | mi | km | Exit | Destinations | Notes |
|---|---|---|---|---|---|
| Tucson | | | | 6th Street | Western terminus of Maclovio Barraza Parkway |
| Tucson | 1.00 | 1.61 | 2 | Broadway Boulevard | At-grade intersection; signed as exit 2 westbound; eastern terminus of Maclovio Barraza Parkway; western terminus of SR 210; west end of limited-access section |
| Tucson | 2.36 | 3.80 | 3 | Kino Parkway | |
| Tucson | 2.88 | 4.63 | 4 | 22nd Street east | Traffic-light interchange; westbound ramp signed as exit 4; no access from 22nd Street to SR 210 eastbound; east end of limited-access section |
| Tucson | 4.78 | 7.69 | — | Alvernon Way | Interchange |
| Tucson | 4.96 | 7.98 | — | Golf Links Road | Interchange; temporary eastern terminus |
| Tucson | | | | Ajo Way | Future diamond interchange; currently an at-grade intersection on Alvernon Way |
| Drexel-Alvernon | | | | I-10 – Phoenix, El Paso | Future tri-stack interchange; currently an at-grade intersection on Alvernon Way; I-10 exit 265 |
1.000 mi = 1.609 km; 1.000 km = 0.621 mi: Incomplete access; Route transition; Unopened
