= Sunset Mountains (Arizona) =

Two mountains in Coconino County, Arizona

East Sunset Mountain

Highest point
- Elevation: 6,853 ft (2,089 m) NAVD 88
- Prominence: 980 ft (300 m)
- Coordinates: 34°50′27″N 110°53′59″W

Geography
- Location: Coconino County, Arizona, U.S.
- Topo map: USGS West Sunset Mountain

West Sunset Mountain

Highest point
- Elevation: 6,613 ft (2,016 m) NAVD 88
- Prominence: 980 ft (299 m)
- Coordinates: 34°52′33″N 110°56′22″W

Geography
- Location: Coconino County, Arizona, U.S.
- Topo map: USGS Sunset Pass

The Sunset Mountains in Coconino County, Arizona, are two small mesas called East Sunset Mountain and West Sunset Mountain, standing southeast of Winslow and surrounding a stretch of State Route 87. They are unrelated to Sunset Mountain near Scottsdale, far south.

Location in Arizona

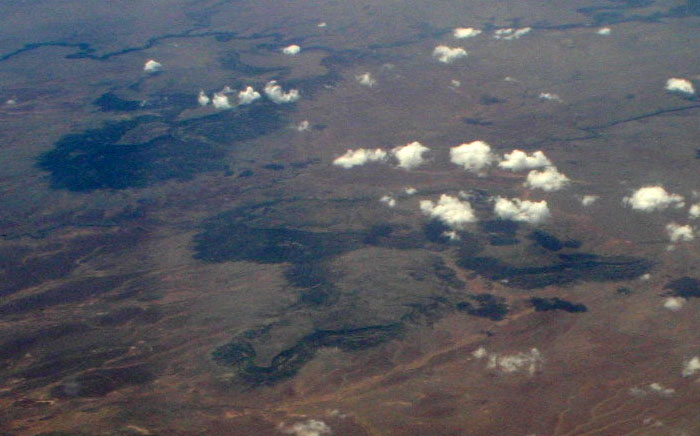
Oblique air photo of West (foreground) and East (background left) Sunset Mountains
