= Aviation Parkway =

Aviation Parkway may refer to:

- Aviation Parkway (Ottawa)
- Aviation Parkway (Raleigh-Durham)
- Arizona State Route 210 in Tucson, named Aviation Parkway
