= Interstate 10 in Arizona =

Interstate Highway in Arizona

Interstate 10
- Pearl Harbor Memorial Highway
- I-10 highlighted in red

Route information
- Maintained by ADOT
- Length: 391.99 mi (630.85 km)
- Existed: 1960–present
- History: First section completed in 1960; Last section opened in 1990.
- NHS: Entire route

Major junctions
- West end: I-10 / US 95 at the California state line in Ehrenberg
- US 95 in Quartzsite; US 60 near Brenda; I-17 / US 60 in Phoenix; US 60 in Tempe; I-8 in Casa Grande; I-19 in Tucson; US 191 near Willcox
- East end: I-10 at the New Mexico state line near San Simon

Location
- Country: United States
- State: Arizona
- Counties: La Paz, Maricopa, Pinal, Pima, Cochise

Highway system
- Interstate Highway System; Main; Auxiliary; Suffixed; Business; Future; Arizona State Highway System; Interstate; US; State; Scenic Proposed; Former
← I-8	→ I-15

In the U.S. state of Arizona, Interstate 10 (I‑10), the major east–west Interstate Highway in the United States Sun Belt, runs east from California, enters Arizona near the town of Ehrenberg and continues through Phoenix and Tucson and exits at the border with New Mexico near San Simon. The highway also runs through the cities of Casa Grande, Eloy, and Marana. Segments of the highway are referred to as either the Papago Freeway, Inner Loop, or Maricopa Freeway within the Phoenix area and the Pearl Harbor Memorial Highway outside metro Phoenix.

== Route description ==
I-10 through Arizona is designated a "Purple Heart Trail", after the Purple Heart, the award received by American soldiers wounded in combat. The western terminus is located at the California border at the Colorado River in La Paz County where I-10 continues westward into California towards Los Angeles. Here, the highway is cosigned as I‑10 and U.S. Route 95 (US 95).

=== Western segment ===
The highway runs east by northeast through Ehrenberg, the Dome Rock Mountains, and Quartzsite and then turns to an east by southeast orientation just before the junction for US 60. It continues this path entering Maricopa County and the Phoenix Metro area. The route turns east by northeast again at the junction for State Route 85 (SR 85) northwest of downtown Buckeye, and turns due east at Verrado Way (exit 120). Here, the speed limit drops from 75 to 65 mph (121 to 105 km/h). The landscape by this point is largely urban.

=== Papago Freeway ===
From there, I-10 traverses through the communities of Goodyear, Avondale, and Tolleson, meeting with local streets and area freeways such as Loop 303 (at the former Cotton Lane interchange, exit 124) and the Loop 101 Agua Fria Freeway along the way. By December 2019, the simple diamond interchange with 59th Avenue (exit 138) was totally rebuilt, transforming it into the first of two junctions with the Loop 202 Ed Pastor Freeway. As it makes its way through Phoenix, the highway meets with I‑17 and US 60 for the first time just northwest of downtown at The Stack.

=== Inner Loop ===
East of The Stack, I-10 forms the north edge of downtown. Near 3rd Avenue, the highway enters a half-mile tunnel (800 m) that runs under a park and the central branch of the City of Phoenix Library. Emerging past 3rd Street, the highway continues due eastward for another two miles (3.2 km) before coming to another interchange for Route 51 and Loop 202 (second of three junctions with the latter), called the Mini Stack. At this interchange, I‑10 turns southward for about three miles (4.8 km), passing near Sky Harbor International Airport and reaching the second junction with I‑17/US 60. Here, I‑17 terminates as I‑10 skews eastward again. After this junction, the highway is cosigned with US 60.

=== Maricopa Freeway ===
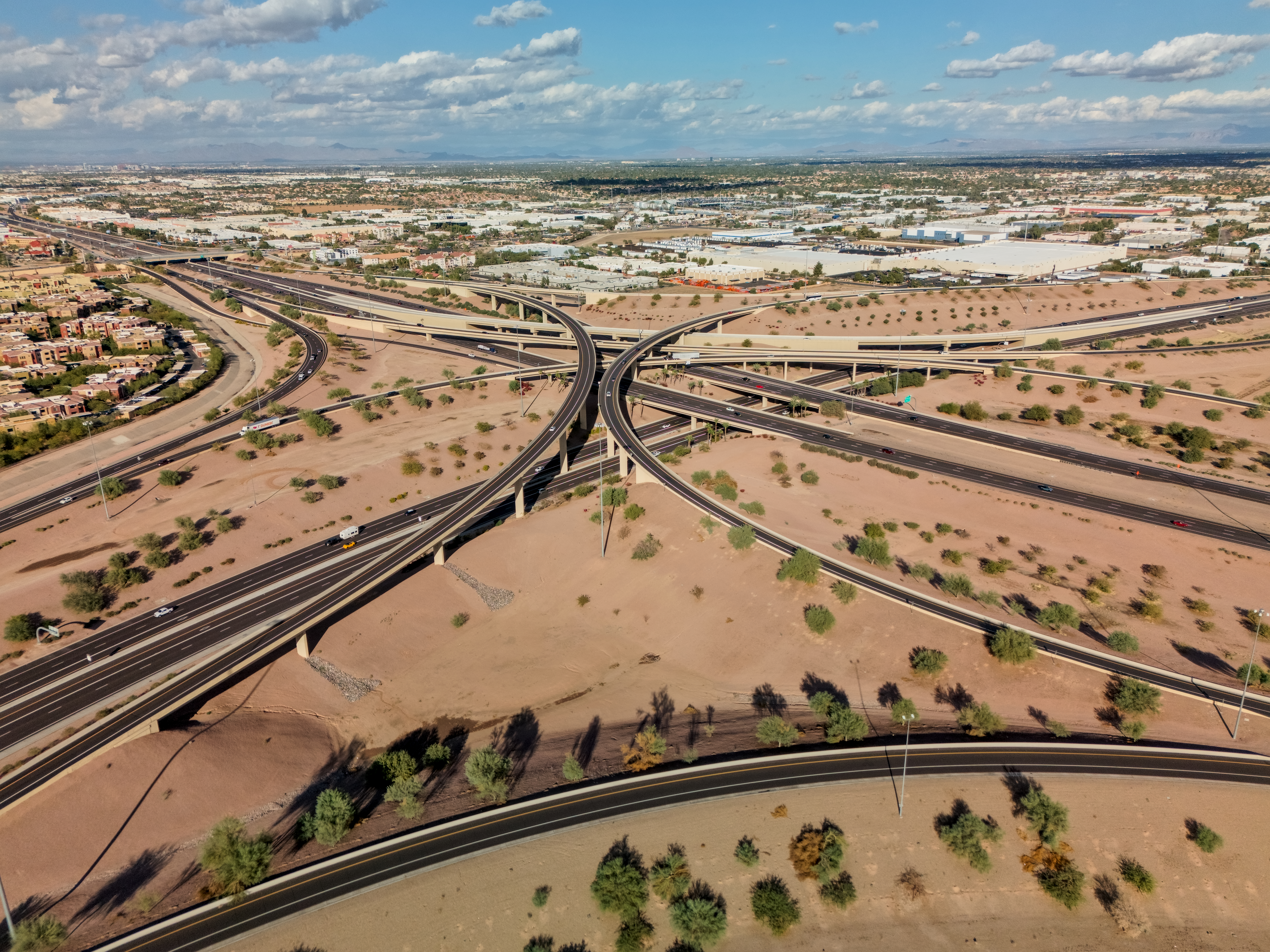
Southern-most intersection of the I-10 and Loop 202

Continuing southeast over the Salt River and eastward, I‑10/US 60 enter Tempe and meets with SR 143. The freeway turns southward again at the Broadway Curve, with US 60 heading east towards Mesa. I‑10 continues southward through Tempe, Guadalupe, and Chandler on the east. Immediately north of the Gila River Indian Community, I‑10 has its third and final intersection with Loop 202. Past Loop 202, the highway heads southeast through the Gila River Indian Community and entering Pinal County.

==== Broadway Curve ====
As of a 2006 estimate, the Broadway Curve portion of I‑10 in Tempe carried an average of 294,000 vehicles per day. This number was predicted to increase by over 150,000 to approximately 450,000 by 2025. The section of I-10 from I-17 to the Broadway Curve is the widest stretch of freeway in the valley and one of the widest in the United States, spanning 16 to 20 lanes, including two HOV lanes in each direction. A recent construction project added collector-distributor lanes and flyover ramps connecting SR 143.

=== Eastern segment ===
After exiting the Phoenix metropolitan area, I‑10 continues primarily south-southeast towards Casa Grande intersecting I‑8 before heading southeast towards Marana and Tucson, paralleling the Santa Cruz River. After an interchange with I-19 in Tucson, I-10 heads in a more easterly direction towards Benson and Willcox, with a brief concurrency with US Route 191. The highway passes through the towns of Bowie and San Simon before entering New Mexico.

== History ==
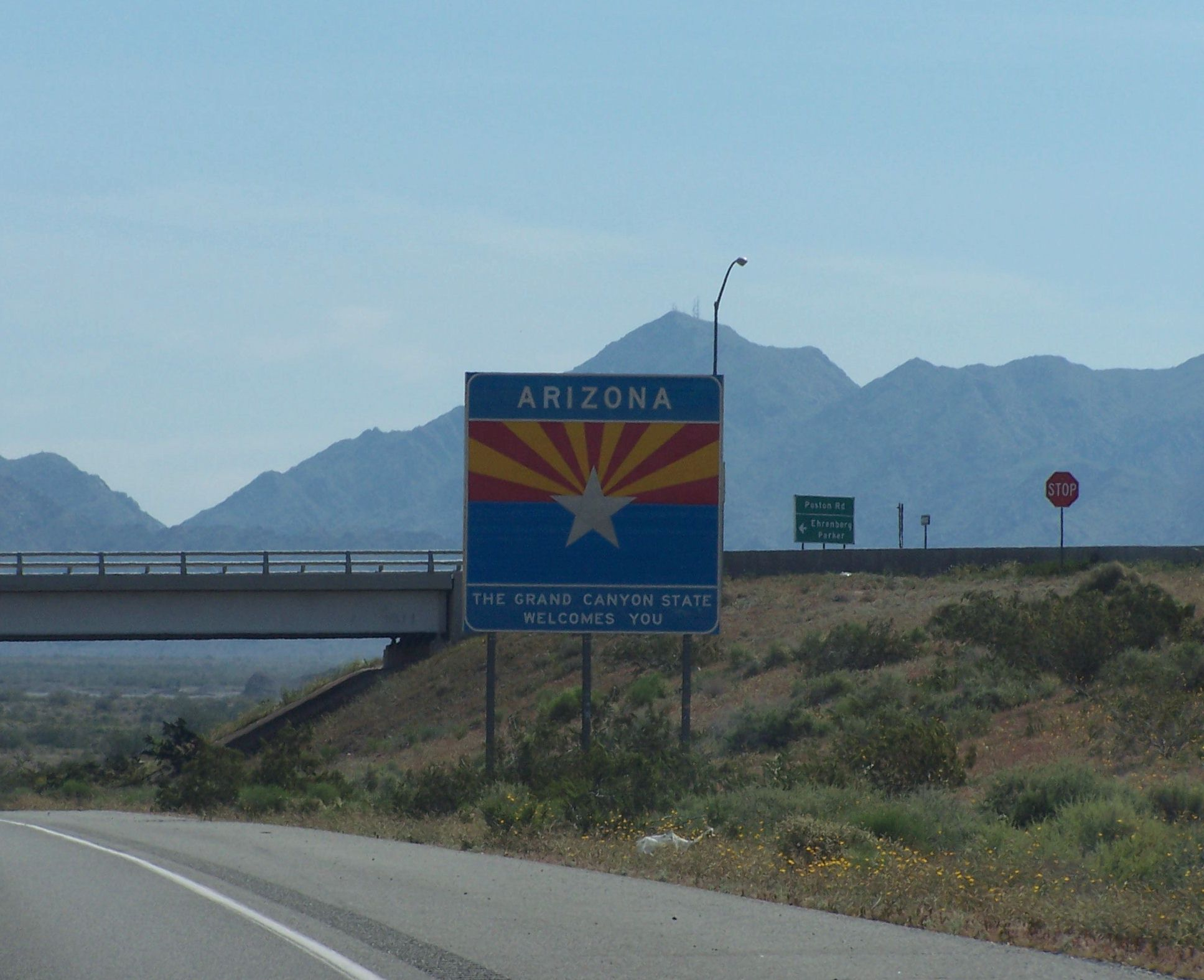
Entering from California

I‑10 in Arizona was laid out by the Arizona Highway Department in 1956–1958 roughly paralleling several historic routes across the state. Particularly east of Eloy, it follows the Butterfield Stage and Pony Express routes, and loops south to avoid the north–south Basin and Range mountains prevalent in the state. In fact, the route from its junction with I‑8 east to New Mexico is almost exactly the same route used by the old horse-drawn stagecoaches, which had to go from waterhole to waterhole and avoid the hostile Apache Indians. This is why I-10 is more of a north–south route between Phoenix and Tucson than east–west. The Southern Pacific Sunset Route line had to take the route of least hills, and in the 1920s highways were laid down next to the trains across southern Arizona.

When the project was being designed in the 1950s, the Arizona Highway Department fought for a nearly straight-shot west from Phoenix for the new freeway, instead of angling northwest out of Phoenix along US 60/US 70/US 89, through Wickenburg. Wickenburgers battled to bring the freeway through their city but lost that battle. The detour up through Wickenburg was logical decades earlier, when nearly all U.S. highways through Arizona were laid out along railroad tracks, and US 60/US 70 was routed mostly parallel to the Santa Fe rail tracks east of Wickenburg, and the Arizona and California Railway west to Vicksburg. The two old federal routes then struck west across the desert and state line, picking up the Southern Pacific mainline at Indio, California, and I-10 overlies the old roads most of that distance.

=== West of Phoenix ===
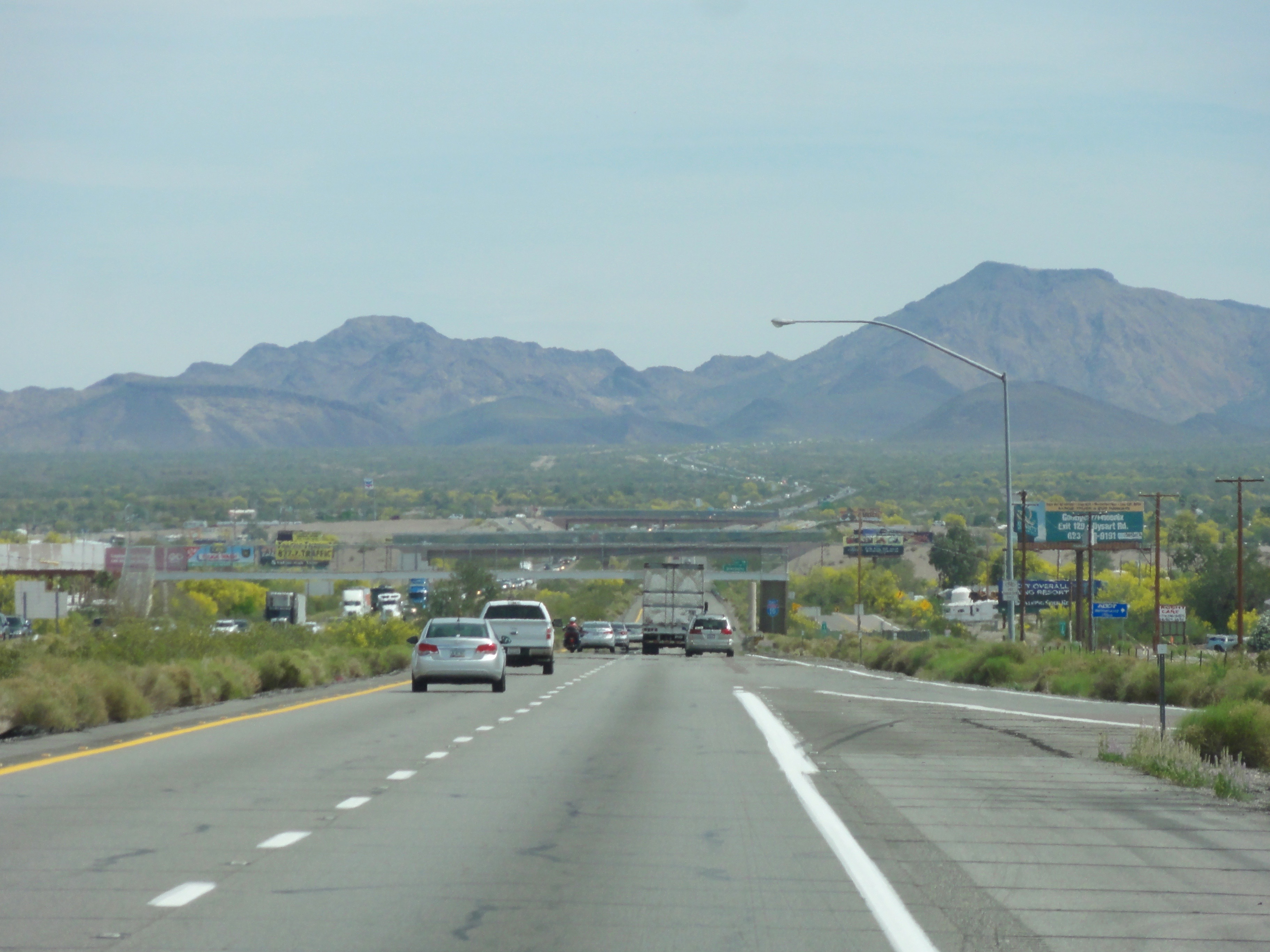
I-10 between Blythe, California, and Quartzsite, Arizona

Moving east from the California line at Ehrenberg, I-10 follows the old route of US 60/US 70 for the first 31 miles (50 km) east from Blythe, California. In 1960, this westernmost stretch of I-10 was built from near the Colorado River east to the future spot where the "Brenda Cutoff" section of I-10 would connect a decade later. Until the early 1970s, this was the last freeway stretch until Phoenix. The "Brenda Cutoff" was named for a gas station on the old road just east of the fork where US 60 now terminates at I-10. Now an obscure name, "Brenda Cutoff" was the working title that the Arizona Highway Department called the stretch of freeway from US 60 to near Buckeye. The Brenda Cutoff paralleled old sand roads used in the 1920s for Phoenix-Los Angeles traffic, but mostly abandoned after US 60/US 70 was built to the north, through Wickenburg.

The Brenda Cutoff's opening on June 18, 1973 was eagerly awaited and was a big deal in newspapers in Phoenix and Los Angeles. It saved motorists from having to drive through Glendale, Sun City, Wickenburg and Salome, about 20 miles (32 km) out of the way, and it eliminated about 80 miles (130 km) of two-lane highway. But the freeway was opened only as far east as Tonopah, and heavy traffic was routed down narrow county roads through the desert and fields between Tonopah and Buckeye. In addition, there was only one very-small gas station on the very-long route between Buckeye and Quartzsite, on the old county road at the tiny crossroads of Palo Verde. Signs warning "No Services Next 106 Miles" were posted at either end of the Brenda Cutoff those first few years.

The freeway was extended past Tonopah as far east as Phoenix's western fringes (at Cotton Lane) in about 1974. I-10's freeway section ended in Goodyear until the controversial Papago Freeway was finished across the western Valley of the Sun in 1990. During the "west valley gap" years, westbound I-10 traffic was routed off the Maricopa Freeway at 19th Avenue in Phoenix, and stayed on the access road as it curved past the Durango Curve. Los Angeles-bound traffic then turned left on Buckeye Road and followed the "TO 10" signs down Buckeye Road (first marked US 80 until 1977, then SR 85) for nearly 15 years.

=== Phoenix metropolitan area ===
The interstate's route through Phoenix was hotly contested in the 1960s, 1970s, and early 1980s. A plan proposed by the Arizona Department of Transportation involved monstrous block-sized 270-degree "helicoil" interchanges at Third Avenue and Third Street that would connect motorists to freeway lanes 100 feet (30 m) in the air, but voters killed it in 1973 as a result of opposition from the Arizona Republic newspaper and a growing nationwide anti-freeway sentiment. Voters on election day were treated to a photo depiction on the front page of the newspaper that in later years was shown to have drastically overstated the freeway's height, but there is no question the proposed viaducts and helicoils would have been a visual gash across central Phoenix.

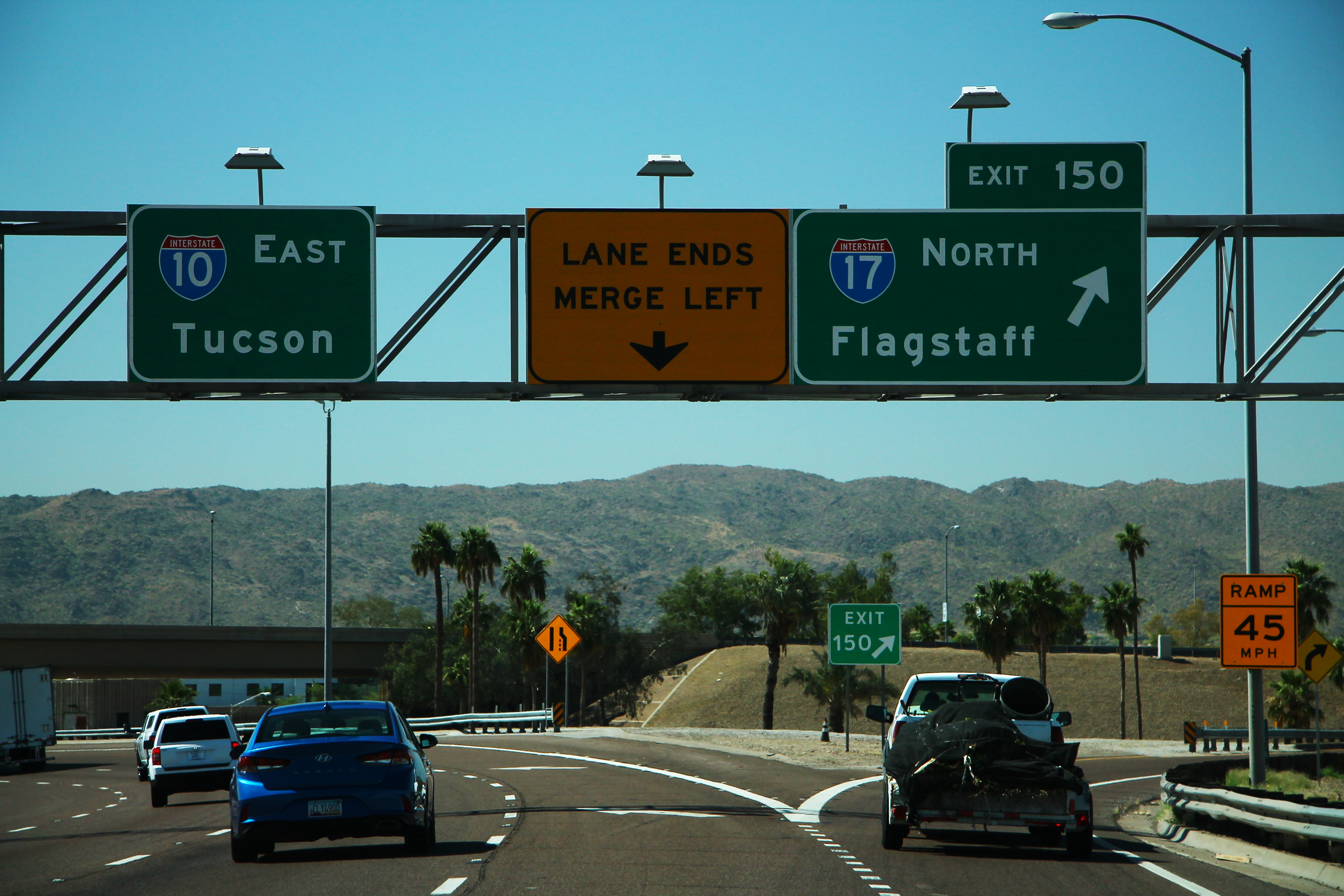
Southern terminus of I-17 in Phoenix

Beginning in 1961, a stub of what is now the Inner Loop portion of I‑10 was built northward from the Maricopa Freeway (then I‑10) along 20th Street, ending 0.5 miles (0.80 km) north at Buckeye Road. This stub was originally designated I-510. The Inner Loop name was given to it in 1969, at which time the highway changed numbers, to I-410. The I-10/I-510 interchange was the first multilevel interchange in Arizona and lasted until the Inner Loop was built as a real freeway in the 1980s. This putative freeway was two lanes in each direction and would have been hopelessly inadequate as a leg of the Inner Loop as it was intended.

After 1973, Arizona engineers favored a more-modest plan to link I-10 with I‑17 at the "Durango Curve" near 19th Avenue at Buckeye Road, and avoid the "Moreland Corridor" alignment of the Papago Freeway by adopting a route south of Buckeye Road. In 1983, ADOT unveiled the current below grade plans on Moreland Street, three blocks south of McDowell Road. Despite some local opposition, I-10 was finally completed in central Phoenix on the Inner Loop alignment, 0.75 miles (1.21 km) north of Van Buren Street, on August 10, 1990. The state is now considering a reliever freeway in West Phoenix, parallel to I-10 on the old Durango Street corridor, and was originally designated as Route 801, which has since been changed to SR 30.

The original 1962 alignment of I-10 through Phoenix was on the Black Canyon and Maricopa Freeways, now signed as I-17 and US 60, starting at about Grand Avenue. From 1962 to 1974, I‑10 in Phoenix ended at 40th Street, and truck traffic through Phoenix and Mesa was directed to use Arizona Route T-69 via 40th Street south and Baseline Road east to connect to SR 87 and SR 93, the shortcuts to Tucson. The I-10 signs were moved from the Maricopa Freeway to the Papago Freeway/Inner Loop alignments when it opened in 1990—the last gap of I-10 to be completed between Santa Monica and Jacksonville. This was the only time in Arizona where the posted freeway was moved from one road to another: the state never posted interstate signs on older state or U.S. highways. ADOT instead made frequent use of interstate shields with the word "TO" above and arrows below the shield.

For several years in the early 1970s, an orphan section of I-10 was opened between Baseline Road and Williams Field Road (now Chandler Boulevard) but was not marked as any highway, nor was it connected to the rest of the Interstate Highway System. ADOT, it seems, did not want to divert trucks down from T-69 in Guadalupe down into the cotton fields west of Chandler. This section got its interstate signs when the freeway south to Tucson was completed in about 1970, and the "Broadway Curve" was connected a year or so later—for almost two years, I-10 traffic used Baseline Road and 40th Street through the Japanese flower gardens until the last link between Tucson and Phoenix opened in about 1972.

From 1958 to 1972, the interstate was unmarked south from Tempe and Mesa, and traffic used either SR 87 through Coolidge or SR 93 through Casa Grande, or US 80/US 89 through Mesa and Florence. I‑10 signs reappeared at the town of Picacho, the 1962–1970 western terminus of the freeway from Tucson.

I-10 was completed with the opening of the Deck Park Tunnel on August 10, 1990.

I‑10 was widened from Verrado Way to Loop 101, a total of thirteen miles (21 km). This included a new HOV lane from Dysart Road (exit 129) to Loop 101, later adding a HOV lane from Estrella Parkway (exit 126) to Dysart Road. From Estrella Parkway to Verrado Way, an additional lane was added.

New interchanges have been added, whereas Citrus Road has a new exit at 123, Sarival Avenue has a new exit at 125, and Fairway Drive has a new exit at 130.

=== Southeast of Phoenix ===
The road from Casa Grande to Tucson was originally SR 84 and SR 93, and when it was rebuilt as a freeway in 1961–1962 it was cosigned as I‑10 and routes 84 and 93 through 1966, when 84 was truncated at Picacho. This section of interstate was completed in 1961, and forced the demolition of the town center at Marana. The freeway through Tucson, which was rebuilt and widened in stages from 1989 to 2014, with frontage roads added, was originally signed as SR 84 from Miracle Mile to Sixth Avenue.

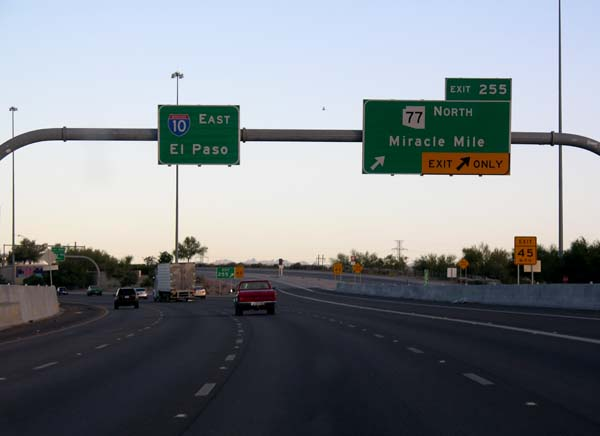
Miracle Mile (SR 77) in Tucson

The original highway from Casa Grande to Tucson entered the Old Pueblo via Miracle Mile, a road modeled after German Autobahns but without overpasses or an exclusive right of way. Traffic circles at either end of Miracle Mile were the best Tucson could come up with in 1937. The section of Miracle Mile West stretching between Miracle Mile and the Southern Pacific overpass was signed as Business Loop 10, SR 84, and SR 93 in the 1960s. It is now marked as the southern leg on SR 77, the new designation for US 80/US 89 north out of Tucson. The Business Loop designation was dropped in 1998.

The present-day I‑10 alignment along the Santa Cruz River was laid out after a city bond issue passed in 1948 to build a riverbank-side boulevard with room for a four-lane freeway in the median to follow. The route was originally called the Tucson Limited Access Highway and the Tucson Freeway. Construction on the bypass began on December 27, 1950. The first section of bypass artery, from Congress Street north to Miracle Mile West, was opened on December 20, 1951 but had no overpasses or interchanges at Grant Road (then DeMoss-Petrie Road), Speedway Boulevard or St. Mary's Road. It was first signed SR 84A. The remainder of the route was finished by 1956 to a new cloverleaf interchange at Sixth Avenue (then US 80 and US 89). In 1958, the state added the bypass to the Interstate Highway System as part of I-10 and began converting it to full freeway standards. The freeway was finally completed in 1961, and parts of it obliterated the original road. The development of Interstate 10 through Tucson also affected the Mexican American neighborhoods along the Santa Cruz River. The SR 84A designation was entirely concurrent with I-10 between Sixth Avenue and Miracle Mile until October 11, 1963, when the designation was finally retired in favor of I-10.

The old cloverleaf at Sixth Avenue was the first built in Arizona, opening in the early 1950s as a southern Tucson gateway junction to the roads linking Tucson, Benson, Nogales, and the hoped-for Tucson bypass along the Santa Cruz River. It was converted to a diamond interchange by 1964 and the old "quick dip" underpass was removed and replaced by an interstate-standard overpass in the late 1980s.

Although the controversial I‑10 route across Phoenix was the last gap of I‑10 to be completed, two pieces of the interstate were subsequently left sitting on divided remnants of old US 80 and were neither built to interstate nor modern safety standards. One was the old Sixth Avenue interchange, and a small section of freeway east to the overpass over the old Southern Pacific (now Union Pacific) spur to Nogales and Guaymas. That section was replaced about 1990.

The last section of old US 80 that carried the I‑10 traffic was an underpass beneath the Union Pacific mainline east of Tucson, where the freeway median shrank to a guardrail at Marsh Station Road and the Pantano railroad overpass was too low. This underpass and section of former US 80 was originally constructed between 1952 and 1955 to replace the older more dangerous route over the 1921 Ciénega Bridge. The Marsh Station Road interchange was replaced in 2011, with the railroad mainline rerouted in 2012 and the railroad overpass removed in 2013. The remainder of the old US 80 section was rebuilt to interstate standards, with completion in 2014.

East of Tucson, I‑10 parallels and, in some cases, overlies old US 80 to Benson, and was originally cosigned as US 80 and SR 86. The section of I-10 from Valencia Road to Rita Road was the first construction project in the state of Arizona funded by the Federal Aid Highway Act of 1956. Construction began in 1957 and was completed in 1960. From Benson, the interstate follows the Southern Pacific mainline east through Willcox and Bowie to New Mexico, rather than bend south to the Mexican border along old US 80 (signed as SR 80 after 1989), through Douglas. The road from Benson east through Willcox was designated SR 86 in about 1935, that route number was subsequently shifted west and exists now between Why and Tucson. The bypass around Benson was opened about 1979, and other than the Phoenix gap was the last section of I‑10 to be opened.

== Future ==
Construction is planned for the 26-mile (42 km) segment from Loop 202 (Santan Freeway) in Chandler to SR 387 near Casa Grande. A third lane will be added in each direction along with improvements to several interchanges, crossroads and bridges. An HOV lane will be constructed for the six-mile (9.7 km) segment from Loop 202 to Riggs Road. Construction was originally planned to begin in 2025 but was sped up to begin in 2023 when Governor Doug Ducey signed a bill allocating funds for this project. The $1 billion project also received a $95 million federal grant in January 2024; the state and the Maricopa Association of Governments will provide the rest of the funding. It is planned to be completed in 2026.

HOV lane connections are planned to be constructed at the Loop 101 interchange in Tolleson. Construction is planned to begin in 2025 and be completed in 2027.

In 2011, ADOT started a study to improve the I-10 in the Tucson area. In December 2020, ADOT released final design concept report that will widen I-10 by two to four lanes from the I-19 to Kolb Road interchanges. Several interchanges will be reconfigured with exit 264 being replaced. SR 210 will also be extended as a freeway to I-10 at the Alvernon Way interchange. The project will be done in 18 phases with two phases already receiving some funding. The project is expected to cost $1.2 billion.

I-10 on the north side of Tucson will also be widened from three to four lanes in each direction between Ina Road to 22nd Street. Construction for this started in March 2022 and is expected to last until 2025. In April 2023, the Orange Grove Road interchange was closed by ADOT as part of the project. This and the Sunset Road interchange will be closed until at least late 2024.

== Exit list ==
County	Location	mi	km	Exit	Destinations	Notes
Colorado River		0.00	0.00		I-10 west / US 95 north – Los Angeles	Continuation into Blythe, California; former US 60 / US 70 west
Colorado River		0.00	0.00	Arizona–California line		
La Paz	Ehrenberg	0.72	1.16	1	Ehrenberg, Parker	
La Paz	Ehrenberg	5.87	9.45	5	Tom Wells Road	
La Paz		11.99	19.30	11	Dome Rock Road	
La Paz	Quartzsite	17.54	28.23	17	BL 10 east / US 95 south to SR 95 north – Parker, Yuma, Quartzsite	Eastern end of US 95 concurrency; former US 60/US 70 east
La Paz	Quartzsite	19.94	32.09	19	BL 10 west (Riggles Avenue) – Quartzsite	Former US 60/US 70 west
La Paz		26.68	42.94	26	Gold Nugget Road	
La Paz		31.18	50.18	31	US 60 east – Wickenburg, Prescott	Western terminus of US 60; former US 70 east
La Paz		45.38	73.03	45	Vicksburg Road to SR 72 west	
La Paz		53.98	86.87	53	Hovatter Road	
La Paz		69.69	112.16	69	Avenue 75E	
Maricopa		81.24	130.74	81	Salome Road	
Maricopa	Tonopah	94.18	151.57	94	411th Avenue – Tonopah	
Maricopa		98.32	158.23	98	Wintersburg Road	
Maricopa		103.47	166.52	103	339th Avenue	
Maricopa	Buckeye	109.70	176.55	109	Sun Valley Parkway / Palo Verde Road	
Maricopa	Buckeye	112.77	181.49	112	SR 85 south to I-8 – Gila Bend, Yuma, San Diego	Northern terminus of SR 85
Maricopa	Buckeye	114.88	184.88	114	Miller Road – Buckeye	Rebuilt into a diverging diamond interchange
Maricopa	Buckeye	117.01	188.31	117	Watson Road	Rebuilt into a diverging diamond interchange
Maricopa	Buckeye	120.24	193.51	120	Verrado Way	
Maricopa	Buckeye	121.72	195.89	121	Jackrabbit Trail	
Maricopa	Buckeye–Goodyear line	122.72	197.50	122	Perryville Road	To Perryville
Maricopa	Goodyear	123.73	199.12	123	Citrus Road / Sarival Avenue	Eastbound exit and westbound entrance
Maricopa	Goodyear	124.73	200.73	124	Loop 303 (Bob Stump Memorial Parkway)	Loop 303 exit 104; formerly Cotton Lane
Maricopa	Goodyear	124.73	200.73	Western end of Papago Freeway		
Maricopa	Goodyear	125.70	202.29	125	Sarival Avenue / Citrus Road	Westbound exit and eastbound entrance
Maricopa	Goodyear	126.71	203.92	126	Pebblecreek Parkway / Estrella Parkway	
Maricopa	Goodyear	127.71	205.53	127	Bullard Avenue	
Maricopa	Goodyear	128.72	207.15	128	Litchfield Road – Goodyear	
Maricopa	Avondale	129.71	208.75	129	Dysart Road	
Maricopa	Avondale	130.13	209.42	Bridge over the Agua Fria River		
Maricopa	Avondale	130.71	210.36	130	Fairway Drive	
Maricopa	Avondale	131.71	211.97	131	Avondale Boulevard	Formerly 115th Avenue
Maricopa	Avondale	132.69	213.54	132	107th Avenue	Westbound access via exit 133A
Maricopa	Avondale–Tolleson line	133.69	215.15	133A	99th Avenue / 107th Avenue	107th Avenue not signed eastbound; 99th Avenue was Temporary Loop 101 before the Agua Fria Freeway interchange was built
Maricopa	Avondale–Tolleson line	133.98	215.62	133B	Loop 101 north (Agua Fria Freeway)	Loop 101 exits 1A-B; counterclockwise terminus of Loop 101
Maricopa	Avondale–Tolleson line			133C	Loop 101 north	Planned HOV interchange to be westbound exit and eastbound entrance; construction planned to start in 2025
Maricopa	Tolleson	134.69	216.76	134	91st Avenue – Tolleson	
Maricopa	Tolleson–Phoenix line	135.68	218.36	135	83rd Avenue	
Maricopa	Phoenix	136.18	219.16	136A	79th Avenue	HOV access only; westbound exit and eastbound entrance
Maricopa	Phoenix	136.70	220.00	136B	75th Avenue	Signed as exit 136 eastbound
Maricopa	Phoenix	137.69	221.59	137	67th Avenue / 59th Avenue	Signed as exit 138C westbound; 59th Avenue not signed eastbound
Maricopa	Phoenix	138.67	223.17	138A	Loop 202 south (Ed Pastor Freeway)	Loop 202 exits 78A-B; signed as exit 138 eastbound; formerly 59th Avenue; access to 59th Avenue now via frontage roads between 67th and 51st Avenues
Maricopa	Phoenix	138.67	223.17	138B	Loop 202 south	HOV interchange; westbound exit and eastbound entrance; clockwise terminus of Loop 202
Maricopa	Phoenix	139.66	224.76	139	51st Avenue / 59th Avenue	Eastbound exit and westbound entrance closed upon construction of the Ed Pastor Freeway interchange
Maricopa	Phoenix	140.66	226.37	140	43rd Avenue	
Maricopa	Phoenix	141.67	228.00	141	35th Avenue	
Maricopa	Phoenix	142.67	229.61	142	27th Avenue	Eastbound exit and westbound entrance; former BL 10 east
Maricopa	Phoenix	143.18	230.43	143A-B	I-17 / US 60 (Black Canyon Freeway) / I-10 Truck east – Flagstaff	Signed as exits 143A (north) and 143B (south), I-10 Truck Route via exit 143B; I-17 exit 200A
Maricopa	Phoenix	143.18	230.43	Eastern end of Papago Freeway; Western end of Inner Loop		
Maricopa	Phoenix	143.89	231.57	143C	19th Avenue / Grand Avenue	Westbound exit and eastbound entrance; Grand Avenue is former US 60/US 89
Maricopa	Phoenix	144.68	232.84	144A	7th Avenue – Downtown	Signed as exit 144 westbound
Maricopa	Phoenix	144.70	232.87	144B	5th Avenue / 3rd Avenue	HOV access only; eastbound exit and westbound entrance
Maricopa	Phoenix	144.96	233.29	Dean Lindsey Memorial Tunnel		
Maricopa	Phoenix	145.70	234.48	145B	3rd Street	HOV access only; westbound exit and eastbound entrance
Maricopa	Phoenix	145.46	234.10	145A	7th Street	Signed as exit 145 eastbound
Maricopa	Phoenix	146.71	236.11	146	16th Street	Eastbound exit and westbound entrance
Maricopa	Phoenix	146.96	236.51	147C	Loop 202 east	HOV access only; eastbound exit and westbound entrance
Maricopa	Phoenix	146.96– 147.27	236.51– 237.01	147A-B	Loop 202 east (Red Mountain Freeway) / SR 51 north	Counterclockwise terminus of Loop 202; southern terminus of SR 51; signed as exits 147A (Loop 202) and 147B (SR 51)
Maricopa	Phoenix	147.27	237.01	147C	SR 51 north	HOV access only; westbound exit and eastbound entrance
Maricopa	Phoenix	148.18	238.47	148	Washington Street / Jefferson Street – Rental Car Return	Westbound entrance includes direct exit ramp to SR 51/Loop 202 (exits 147A-B); signed as "Jefferson Street / Washington Street" only westbound
Maricopa	Phoenix	148.94	239.70	149	Sky Harbor	Eastbound exit and westbound entrance
Maricopa	Phoenix	149.34	240.34	149	Buckeye Road – Sky Harbor, Rental Car Return	Westbound exit and eastbound entrance
Maricopa	Phoenix	149.57	240.71	150A	I-17 north / US 60 west (Maricopa Freeway west) / I-10 Truck west – Flagstaff	Western end of US 60 concurrency; southern terminus of I-17; signed as exit 150 eastbound; I-17 exit 194
Maricopa	Phoenix	149.57	240.71	Eastern end of Inner Loop; Western end of Maricopa Freeway concurrency		
Maricopa	Phoenix	149.94	241.31	150B	24th Street	Westbound exit and eastbound entrance
Maricopa	Phoenix	150.77	242.64	Bridge over the Salt River		
Maricopa	Phoenix	151.50	243.82	151	University Drive / 32nd Street	Formerly signed as exit 151A
Maricopa	Phoenix	152.39	245.25	152	40th Street	Formerly signed as exit 151B; westbound access via exit 154B
Maricopa	Phoenix–Tempe line	153.38	246.84	153	SR 143 north (Hohokam Expressway) / Broadway Road / 48th Street	Eastbound exit and westbound entrance; exit 1 on SR 143; entrance includes direct entrance ramp from Univeristy Dr.; SR 143 is former BL 10 west; formerly signed as exit 152; serves Phoenix Sky Harbor International Airport
Maricopa	Tempe			—	SR 143 north	HOV interchange; westbound exit and eastbound entrance; serves Phoenix Sky Harbor International Airport
Maricopa	Tempe	155.17	249.72	154	US 60 east (Superstition Freeway) – Mesa, Globe	Eastern end of US 60 concurrency; eastbound exit and westbound entrance, includes HOV access on left exit/left entrance; former SR 360 east
Maricopa	Tempe			154B	SR 143 north (Hohokam Expressway) / 40th Street	Westbound exit and eastbound entrance; exit 172B on US 60; serves Phoenix Sky Harbor International Airport; exit ramp onto SR 143 includes direct exit to University Drive
Maricopa	Tempe	155.25	249.85	154A	US 60 east (Superstition Freeway) / Broadway Road / 52nd Street – Mesa	Westbound exit and eastbound entrance
Maricopa	Tempe–Guadalupe line	155.94	250.96	155	Baseline Road – Guadalupe	Guadalupe is on eastbound signage
Maricopa	Tempe	157.98	254.24	157	Elliot Road – Guadalupe	Guadalupe is on westbound signage
Maricopa	Tempe	158.98	255.85	158	Warner Road	
Maricopa	Phoenix–Chandler line	159.98	257.46	159	Ray Road	
Maricopa	Phoenix–Chandler line	160.98	259.07	160	Chandler Boulevard	Formerly Williams Field Road
Maricopa	Phoenix–Chandler line	161.50	259.91	161A-B	Loop 202	Loop 202 exit 55A-B
Maricopa	Phoenix–Chandler line	161.50	259.91	161C	Loop 202 east (SanTan Freeway)	HOV access only; eastbound exit and westbound entrance; Loop 202 exit 55C
Maricopa	Phoenix–Chandler line	161.50	259.91	Eastern end of Maricopa Freeway		
Maricopa		162.82	262.03	162	Wild Horse Pass Boulevard / Sundust Road	Formerly Maricopa Road
Maricopa		164.80	265.22	164	SR 347 south (Queen Creek Road)	Northern terminus of SR 347
Maricopa				166	Koli Road	Future interchange
Maricopa		167.78	270.02	167	Riggs Road	
Pinal	Sweet Water Village	176.11	283.42	175	SR 587 (Casa Blanca Road) – Chandler, Gilbert	Former SR 93 north
Pinal				179	Seed Farm Road	Future interchange
Pinal		185.56	298.63	185	SR 387 to SR 187 – Casa Grande, Coolidge, Sacaton, Florence	Former SR 93 south
Pinal	Casa Grande	190.95	307.30	190	McCartney Road	
Pinal	Casa Grande	195.19	314.13	194	SR 287 (Florence Boulevard)	
Pinal	Casa Grande	198.40	319.29	198	Jimmie Kerr Boulevard (SR 84)	Former SR 93
Pinal	Casa Grande	199.36	320.84	199	I-8 west (Phoenix Bypass Route) – San Diego	Eastern terminus of I-8; exits 178A-B on I-8
Pinal	Casa Grande–Eloy line	200.40	322.51	200	Sunland Gin Road – Arizona City	Westbound entrance includes direct exit ramp to I-8 (exit 199)
Pinal	Eloy	204.13	328.52	203	Toltec Road	
Pinal	Eloy	209.09	336.50	208	Sunshine Boulevard	
Pinal		211.27	340.01	211A	Picacho	Closed in 2019; was eastbound exit and westbound entrance
Pinal	Picacho	211.27	340.01	211	SR 87 north to SR 84 west – Coolidge, Florence	Formerly signed as exit 211B eastbound; southern terminus of SR 87; north of interchange is eastern terminus of unsigned section of SR 84; former SR 93 north
Pinal	Picacho	212.49	341.97	212	Picacho	Closed in 2019; was westbound exit and eastbound entrance
Pinal		220.13	354.26	219	Picacho Peak Road – Picacho Peak State Park	
Pinal	Red Rock	226.74	364.90	226	Red Rock	
Pinal	Avra			—	Saguaro Power Plant & Solar Facility	Westbound exit only; exit not signed
Pinal		232.30	373.85	232	Pinal Air Park Road	
Pima	Marana	236.71	380.95	236	Marana Road	
Pima	Marana			238	Moore Road	Proposed interchange
Pima	Marana	240.74	387.43	240	Tangerine Road	
Pima	Marana	243.24	391.46	242	Avra Valley Road	
Pima	Marana	244.81	393.98	244	Twin Peaks Road	
Pima	Marana	247.02	397.54	246	Cortaro Road	
Pima	Marana	249.01	400.74	248	Ina Road	
Pima	Marana	250.35	402.90	250	Orange Grove Road	
Pima	Marana–Tucson line	251.47	404.70	251	Sunset Links Road	Formerly Sunset Road
Pima	Tucson	252.71	406.70	252	El Camino del Cerro / Ruthrauff Road	
Pima	Tucson	254.59	409.72	254	Prince Road	
Pima	Tucson	255.57	411.30	255	SR 77 north (Miracle Mile)	Southern terminus of SR 77; former SR 84 east/SR 93 south
Pima	Tucson	256.46	412.73	256	Grant Road	
Pima	Tucson	257.61	414.58	257	Speedway Boulevard / St. Marys Road – University of Arizona	No westbound signage for St. Mary's Road
Pima	Tucson	258.65	416.26	258	Congress Street / Broadway Boulevard / St. Mary's Road	Broadway Boulevard not signed westbound, St. Mary's Road not signed eastbound; access to Tucson Station (Amtrak)
Pima	Tucson–South Tucson line	259.63	417.83	259	22nd Street / 29th Street / Starr Pass Boulevard / Silverlake Road	
Pima	Tucson–South Tucson line	260.39	419.06	260	I-19 south – Nogales	I-19 exit 101; northern terminus of I-19
Pima	Tucson	261.28	420.49	261	6th Avenue (Historic US 80 west) / 4th Avenue	6th Avenue is former BL 19 south and former US 80 west/US 89 south
Pima	Tucson	261.72	421.20	262	Benson Highway (Historic US 80 east) / Park Avenue	Benson Highway not signed westbound; Park Avenue is former US 89/SR 93; Benson Highway is former BL 10/US 80 east (Tucson-Benson Highway)
Pima	Tucson	262.53	422.50	263	Kino Parkway / Ajo Way – Tucson International Airport	Split into exits 263A (Kino south) and 263B (Kino north/Ajo) eastbound; will be reconfigured to a diverging diamond interchange (DDI) as part of I-10 widening/SR 210 extension
Pima	Tucson	263.82	424.58	264	Country Club Road	Opened in 2026; replaces former exit 264; diverging diamond interchange (DDI)
Pima	Tucson	264.37	425.46	264	Palo Verde Road / Irvington Road	Closed in 2026; formerly signed exits 264A (Palo Verde south) and 264B (Palo Verde north/Irvington) eastbound
Pima	Drexel-Alvernon	265.02	426.51	265B	Alvernon Way	Westbound exit signed as "Alvernon Way north;" will be reconfigured to a tri-stack interchange as part of I-10 widening/SR 210 extension project
Pima	Drexel-Alvernon	265.02	426.51	265A	SR 210 west (Barraza-Aviation Parkway)	Future interchange, part of the tri-stack interchange as part of I-10 widening/SR 210 extension project
Pima	Tucson	267.40	430.34	267	Valencia Road (Historic US 80 west) – Tucson International Airport	Former BL 10/US 80 west (Tucson-Benson Highway); diamond interchange; will be realigned as part of I-10 widening/SR 210 extension project
Pima	Tucson	268.39	431.93	268	Craycroft Road	Tight diamond interchange; will be realigned as part of I-10 widening/SR 210 extension project
Pima	Tucson	269.64	433.94	269	Wilmot Road	Tight diamond interchange; will be realigned as part of I-10 widening/SR 210 extension project
Pima	Tucson	270.87	435.92	270	Kolb Road	Will be reconfigured to a Three-level diverging diamond interchange as part of I-10 widening/SR 210 extension project
Pima	Tucson	273.43	440.04	273	Rita Road	
Pima	Tucson	275.77	443.81	275	Houghton Road	Reconfiguration to a diverging diamond interchange completed in November 2021
Pima	Vail	279.68	450.10	279	Colossal Cave Road / Wentworth Road	
Pima	Vail	281.96	453.77	281	SR 83 south – Sonoita, Patagonia	Northern terminus of SR 83; access to north frontage road/Marsh Station Road (former US 80 east)
Pima		291.32	468.83	291	Marsh Station Road	Former US 80 west and former exit 289
Pima		292.77	471.17	292	Empirita Road	
Cochise	Mescal	297.45	478.70	297	Mescal Road / J Six Ranch Road	
Cochise		299.63	482.21	299	Skyline Road	
Cochise	Benson	302.67	487.10	302	SR 90 east – Fort Huachuca, Sierra Vista	Western terminus of SR 90
Cochise	Benson	304.16	489.50	303	BL 10 east to SR 80 east – Tombstone, Douglas	No westbound exit; western terminus of BL 10; former US 80 east
Cochise	Benson	305.20	491.17	304	Ocotillo Street	
Cochise	Benson	307.43	494.76	306	BL 10 west (Pomerene Road) to SR 80 – Tombstone	Eastern terminus of BL 10; former SR 86 west
Cochise		313.56	504.63	312	Sibyl Road	
Cochise		319.76	514.60	318	Dragoon Road	
Cochise		323.39	520.45	322	Johnson Road	
Cochise		332.41	534.96	331	US 191 south – Sunsites, Douglas	Western end of US 191 concurrency
Cochise		337.69	543.46	336	BL 10 east to Taylor Road – Chiricahua National Park	
Cochise	Willcox	341.33	549.32	340	SR 186 east (Rex Allen Drive) / Fort Grant Road	
Cochise		345.28	555.67	344	BL 10 west to Old Stewart Road	
Cochise		353.19	568.40	352	US 191 north – Safford	Eastern end of US 191 concurrency
Cochise	Luzena	356.77	574.17	355	To US 191 north – Safford	Access via unsigned US 191 Spur (Page Ranch Road); signed as "Safford" only eastbound
Cochise	Bowie	363.66	585.25	362	BL 10 east – Bowie	
Cochise	Bowie	367.60	591.59	366	BL 10 west – Bowie	
Cochise	San Simon	379.75	611.15	378	BL 10 east – San Simon	
Cochise	San Simon	383.14	616.60	382	BL 10 west – San Simon	
Cochise		391.57	630.17	390	Cavot Road	
Cochise		391.99	630.85		I-10 east – El Paso	Continuation into New Mexico
1.000 mi = 1.609 km; 1.000 km = 0.621 mi: Closed/former; Concurrency terminus; HOV only; Incomplete access; Route transition; Unopened

Interstate 10
Previous state: California	Arizona	Next state: New Mexico
