= Arizona State Route 93 =

Former state highway in Arizona, United States

State Route 93
- SR 93 highlighted in red

Route information
- Maintained by ADOT
- Length: 247.13 mi (397.72 km) Length includes concurrencies with other highways.
- Existed: October 11, 1946–August 16, 1991

Major junctions
- South end: Fed. 15 in Nogales
- US 89 in Nogales; I-19 from Nogales to Sahuarita; I-10 in Tucson; US 89 in Tucson; I-10 from Tucson to near Picacho; I-10 in the Gila River Indian Reservation; US 60 / US 89 / SR 87 in Mesa; I-17 in Phoenix; US 60 in Wickenburg
- North end: US 89 / US 93 near Wickenburg

Location
- Country: United States
- State: Arizona
- Counties: Santa Cruz, Pima, Pinal, Maricopa

Highway system
- Arizona State Highway System; Interstate; US; State; Scenic Proposed; Former
← US 93	→ US 95

Arizona State Route 93, abbreviated SR 93, was a state highway in Arizona that existed from 1946 to 1991. The route was co-signed with other highways along nearly all of its route from Kingman to the border at Nogales. SR 93 was the original designation for the highway from Kingman to Wickenburg, which was built in 1946. In 1965, the northern terminus of the state route was moved south to an unnamed desert junction with U.S. Route 89 just north of Wickenburg, and the southern terminus of U.S. Route 93 was moved south to the US 89 junction. The Arizona Highway Department sought U.S. Highway status for SR 93 across the rest of the state, but the proposal was never granted by AASHTO. On December 17, 1984, the SR 93 designation was removed south of the Grand Avenue/Van Buren Street/7th Avenue intersection in Phoenix. The route was completely decommissioned in 1991.

== History ==
An early shield used by SR 93.

By 1935, the American Association of State Highway Officials (AASHO) had received two extension requests for U.S. Route 93 south of what was then its southern terminus in Glendale, Nevada. Arizona State Highway Engineer T.S. O'Connell requested US 93 extend southwest into California to meet US 99 in El Centro. At a later time, he reconsidered and sent a second request for US 93 multiplex with US 466 over the new Boulder Dam into Arizona and end at US 66 in Kingman. This created a conflict, leading to both proposals being accidentally denied. After a misunderstanding regarding the conflicting proposals from O'Connell, the second proposal was re-evaluated and approved. Thus, US 93 was extended into Arizona. In 1936, the Arizona Highway Department began exploring the possibility of a further extension of US 93. The first extension proposal called for US 93 to end in Phoenix, being extended from Kingman by way of US 66 through Ash Fork. A new US 193 was proposed from Phoenix through Sacaton and Casa Grande to Picacho. At the time, US 89 served the road between Ash Fork and Phoenix, while State Route 87, State Route 187 and State Route 84 ran between Sacaton and Picacho through Casa Grande (of which only SR 87 still traverses today).

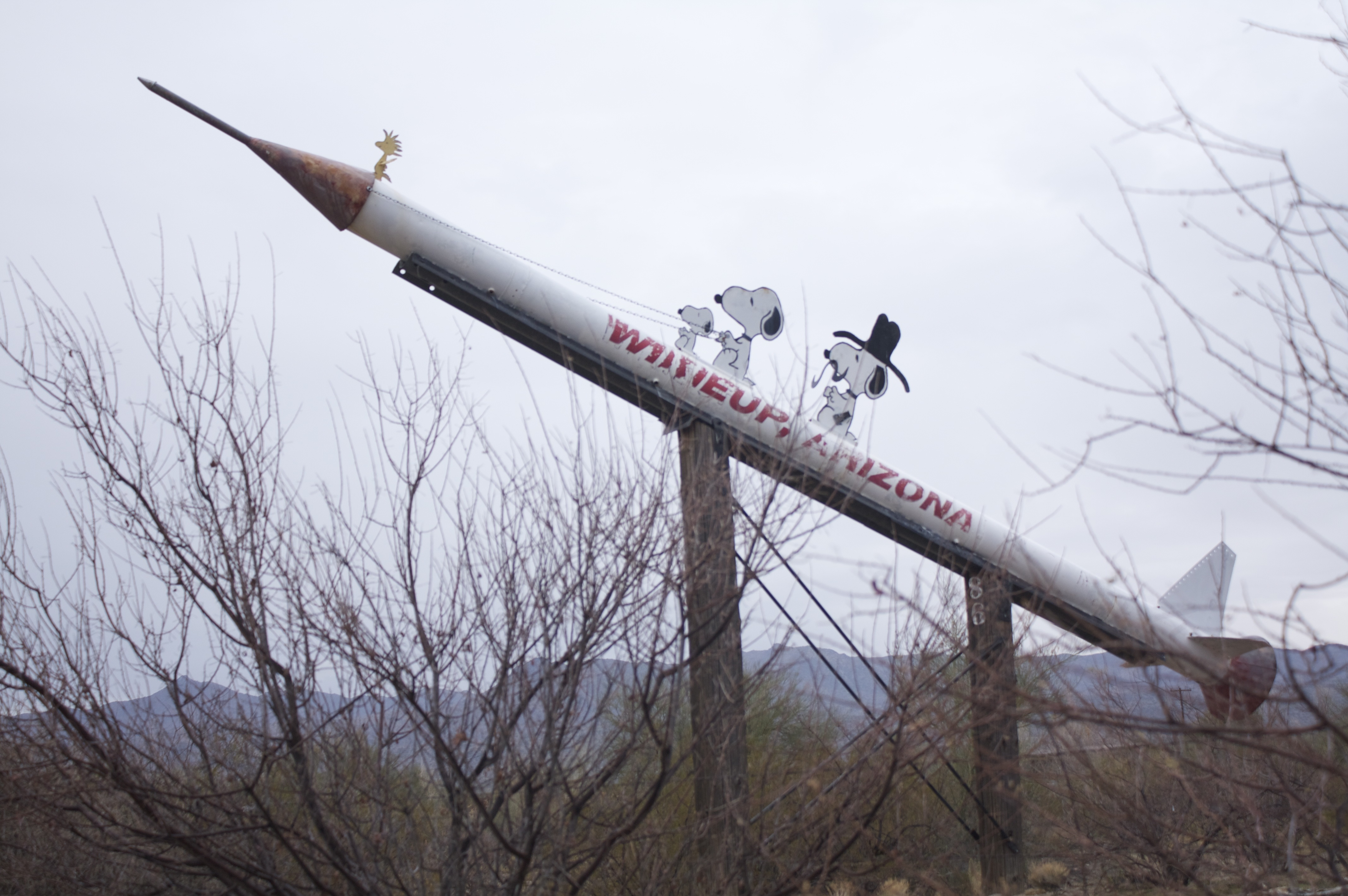
Welcome sign for Wikieup on former SR 93, now US 93.

Upon hearing of the proposed extensions, citizens of Wickenburg, Wikieup and Aguila protested to have US 93 run through their towns instead. The protest was considered and the Arizona Highway Department changed its proposal to meet the protester's arguments. The Arizona State Legislature passed a bill instructing the Highway Department to eventually designate and maintain a route for US 93 from Kingman to US 60 via Wikieup once construction work was completed on existing US 93 within the state. The first extension proposal was modified, asking for the US 93 concurrency with US 66 and US 89 to be signed instead as US 93T and for the proposed US 193 to become US 93A. On June 7, 1937, the finalized proposal was submitted to the AASHO, with the US 93T and US 93A suffixes omitted. The proposal was not accepted.

Construction for the proposed extension of US 93 was approved on August 21, 1942. On October 11, 1946, the highway between US 89 near Wickenburg and US 66 in Kingman was officially added to the state highway system as State Route 93. The hope was that SR 93 would eventually become the long-awaited extension of US 93 south of Kingman. The early route of SR 93 took a southeast jog to SR 71 and US 89 in Congress. Between 1956 ad 1961, SR 93 was redirected onto a more direct routing to SR 71 southwest of Congress. In 1954, the SR 93 designation was extended south along US 89, US 60, US 70, US 80, SR 87, SR 387 and SR 84 to the United States–Mexico International Border in Nogales. SR 93 now served the cities of Phoenix, Casa Grande and Tucson. In 1958, the Arizona Highway Department proposed for the original section of SR 93 to become an extension of US 93. During the AASHO meeting on June 26, 1958, the request was denied. At the time the proposed alignment of SR 93 between SR 71 and US 89 did not exist and was still in survey planning. This proposed route wasn't officially planned until 1962. The entirety of SR 93 from Kingman to Wickenburg was officially designated the Joshua Forest Parkway in 1963.

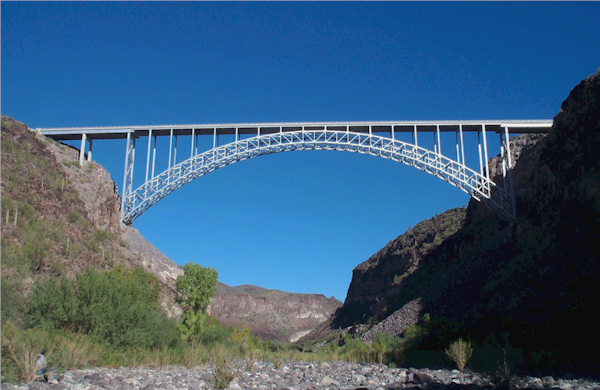
1966 Burro Creek Bridge

The Arizona Highway Department renewed and modified its earlier extension proposal of US 93 on April 30, 1965. The modified proposal stated the US 93 extension was to take over all of SR 93 between Nogales and Kingman, rather than just the route between Kingman and Wickenburg. During this time, the Burro Creek Bridge had begun construction. The U.S. Route Numbering Committee of the AASHO considered this action on June 28, 1965, but the idea was ultimately denied. According to the AASHO, the route was substandard in many areas, didn't carry nearly enough traffic to justify U.S. Highway status and part of the road had yet to be completed to Wickenburg. Part of the proposal was reconsidered on June 28, 1965, approving an extension of US 93 between Kingman and Wickenburg under the condition that substandard areas of the road were improved quickly. With the extension of US 93, the SR 93 designation was retired north of Wickenburg, but continued to exist between Wickenburg and Nogales. Over time, the route of SR 93 was modernized, being joined by Interstate 10 and Interstate 19. Part of SR 93 between Chandler and Casa Grande was abandoned in 1972 and the route was re-routed onto I-10. In 1984, SR 93 was truncated south of its junction with I-10 BL / SR 85 (Van Buren Street), at the intersection of Grand Avenue and 7th Avenue in Phoenix. The SR 93 designation was finally retired on August 16, 1991.

Though never reaching the Mexican border, US 93 was eventually extended further south from US 89 north of Wickenburg. In 1991, the AASHTO approved a request from the Arizona Department of Transportation to eliminate all of US 89 south of Flagstaff. Thus, US 93 was extended to its current southern terminus at US 60 in Wickenburg.

== Route description ==
At its original northern terminus in Kingman, State Route 93 branched off of U.S. Route 66 (Andy Devine Avenue) at Louise Avenue, which is several miles east of where U.S. Route 93 and U.S. Route 466 branched northwest to Boulder City and Las Vegas. The old two-lane SR 93 headed east, south of and parallel to the new alignment of Interstate 40 until it came to the new section of SR 93 built to connect with the new freeway at DW Ranch Road. (I-40 exit 59). The old road turnoff from the current U.S. 93 alignment is still apparent 4.9 miles (7.9 km) south of the I-40/US 93 interchange.

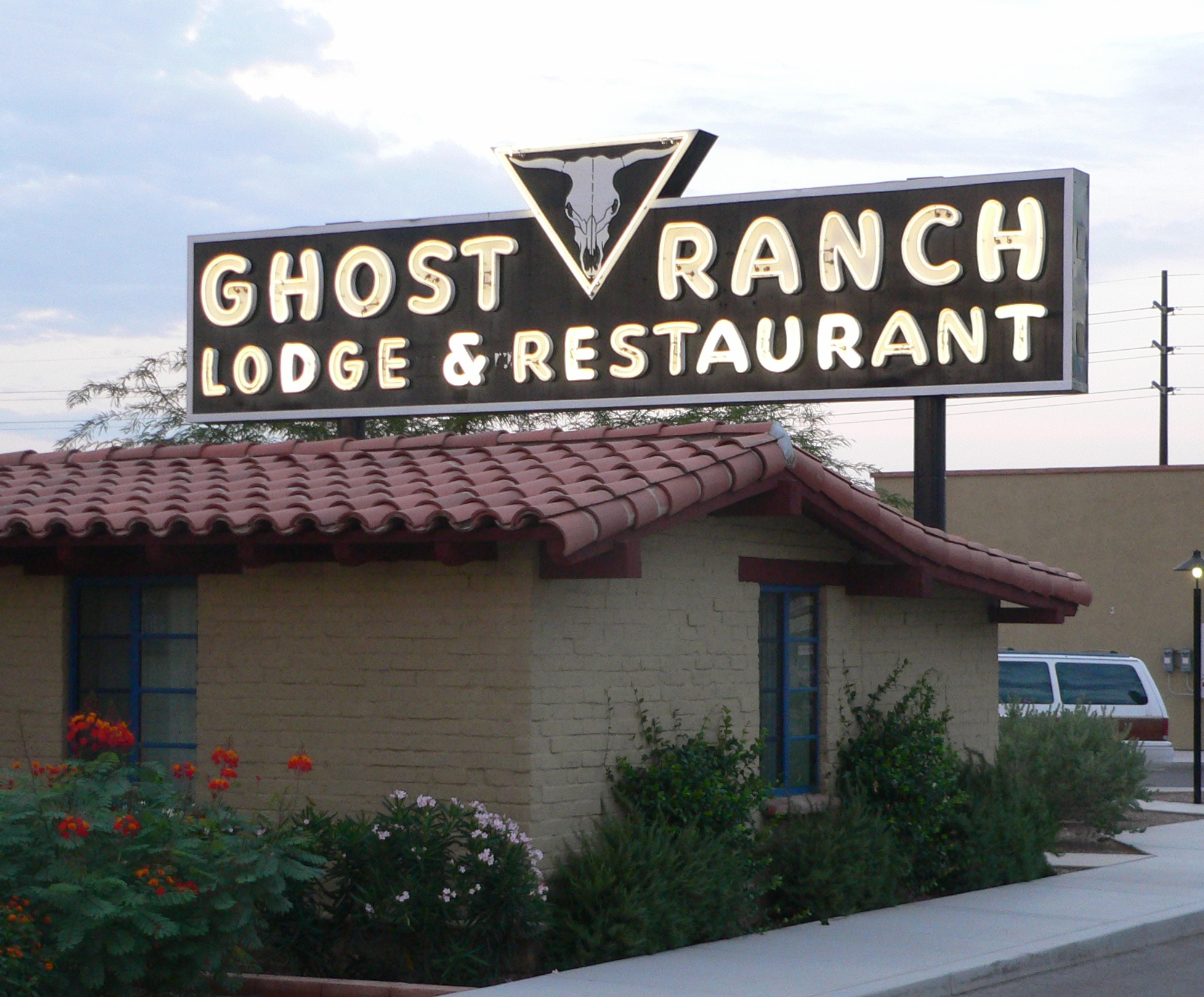
Ghost Ranch Lodge on former SR 84/SR 93 in Tucson. The sign was designed by artist Georgia O'Keeffe.

From Wickenburg to the southeast, SR 93 was co-signed with U.S. Routes 60, 70 and 89 to Phoenix, via Grand Avenue. At Grand Ave.'s terminus, located at Van Buren Street and 7th Avenue (Five Points), the quartet of highways picked up U.S. Route 80 from San Diego. On Van Buren Street, the "SR 93" emblem was at the bottom of the 60-70-80-89-93 totem pole for years (along with Business Loop 10 in the 1970s and '80s). The co-signing continued through Tempe on Mill Avenue and Apache Boulevard, and Mesa's Main Street (but without BL-10, which went south from Phoenix on 44th Street to join Interstate 10 at 48th Street near Broadway Road.).

At downtown Mesa's Country Club Drive, SR 93 made a south turn and was co-signed with State Route 87. About five miles (8 km) south of Chandler, SR 87 forked off to the southeast and SR 93 had its own unshared road south about 30 miles (48 km) to Casa Grande. The middle section of this road was abandoned to the Gila River Indian Community in 1973 after it was overlapped by the adjacent Interstate 10 freeway in 1970. The old road continues a bit south of I-10's Casa Blanca Road as a Gila River Indian route, but dead ends at a new canal. The remainder of the road, from the canal to its former junction with what is now SR 387 near exit 185 on Interstate 10, is closed to traffic. The old road can be seen from images on Google Earth or other satellite images. When SR 93 was delisted, the road to Chandler from the south became SR 587 to connect SR 87 south of Chandler with I-10 at Casa Blanca Rd. The southern stub, from I-10 to downtown Casa Grande, was posted SR 387.

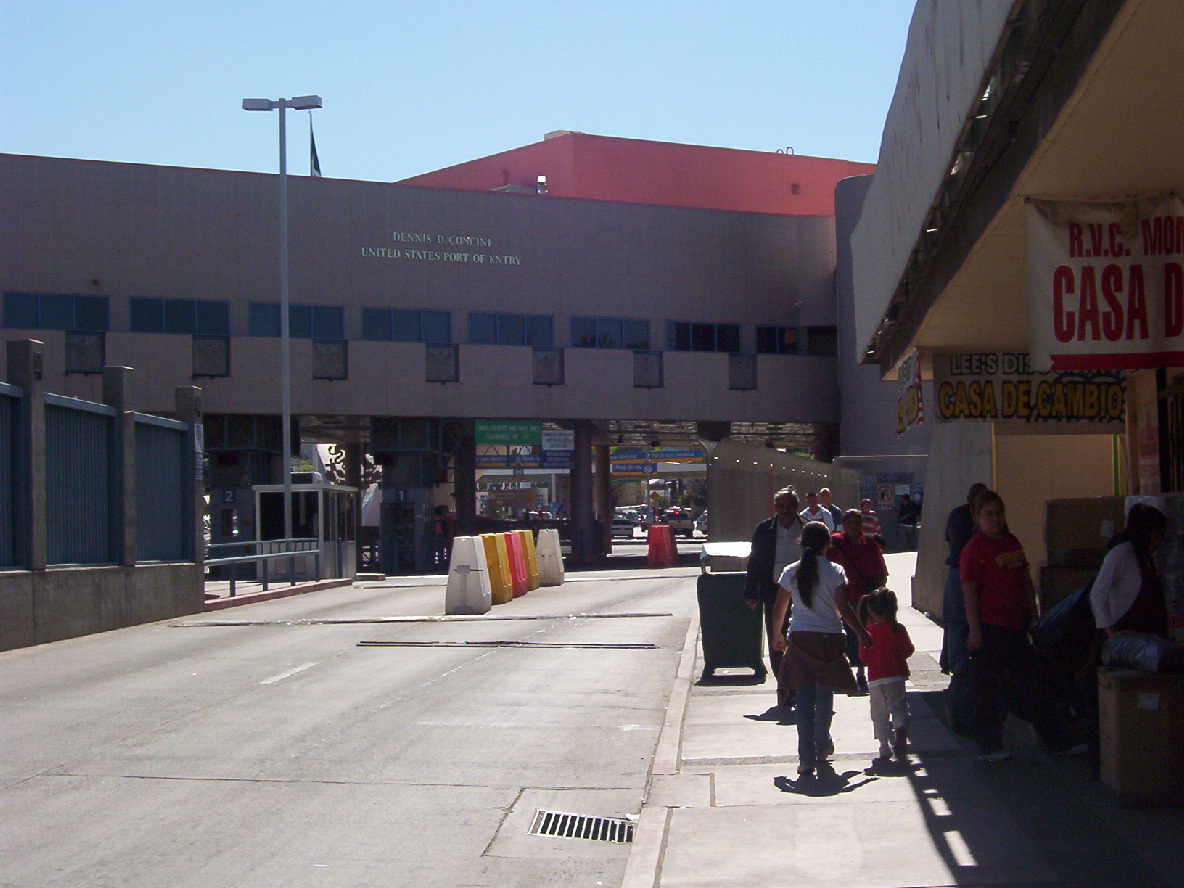
Grand Avenue border gate in Nogales. Southern terminus of SR 93.

Southeast from Casa Grande, SR 93 overlapped State Route 84 to Tucson. SR 84 was later truncated to the Picacho interchange with I-10. SR 84 now terminates in Casa Grande. SR 93 remained co-signed with I-10 from Picacho to Miracle Mile in Tucson, and then was co-signed with Tucson's Business Loop 10 on Miracle Mile (formerly State Route 84A, now the southernmost leg of State Route 77), and then co-signed again with U.S. Routes 80 and 89 (and State Route 789, a strange little highway) down Oracle Road to Drachman Street.

In Tucson, the highways zigged three blocks east on Drachman St. to Stone Avenue and then headed south to downtown Tucson under the railroad tracks south to Tucson's Five Points at 17th Street and 6th Avenue. From 17th St., U.S. 80/89 and SR 93/789 extended south on 6th Ave. through South Tucson to the old S. Tucson interchange. Headed south toward Mexico, US 89, SR 93, and SR 789 were co-signed to the Grand Avenue border gate in Nogales. The 1960-era highway exists nearly unchanged from Tucson to Green Valley, east of the new Interstate 19 and in Nogales.

== Major intersections ==
Historical highway intersections as listed shortly before SR 93 was decommissioned.

County	Location	mi	km	Destinations	Notes
Santa Cruz	Nogales	0.00	0.00	Fed. 15 south – Nogales US 89 begins	Southern terminus; international Border with Mexico; southern end of concurrency with US 89; mileposts reflect US 89
Santa Cruz	Nogales	0.14	0.23	I-19 north (Crawford Street) – Tucson	Southern terminus of I-19
Santa Cruz	Nogales	1.53	2.46	SR 82 east – Patagonia	
Santa Cruz	Nogales	2.77	4.46	SR 189 south to Mexico	
Santa Cruz	Nogales	5.88	9.46	I-19 south	Southern end of concurrency with I-19; exit 8 on I-19; no access to I-19 SB from US 89/SR 93 NB
Overlap with I-19
Pima	Sahuarita	43.88	70.62	I-19 north	Northern end of concurrency with I-19; exit 69 on I-19
Pima	Tucson	63.50	102.19	SR 86 west – Sells	Eastern terminus of SR 86
Pima	South Tucson	63.72– 64.12	102.55– 103.19	I-10 BL east (Tucson-Benson Highway) / I-10 – Benson, Marana	Southern end of concurrency with I-10 BL; I-10 exit 261; former US 80 east
Pima	Tucson	69.55 256.71	111.93 413.13	US 89 north (Oracle Road) – Oro Valley	Northern end of concurrency with US 89; mileposts change to reflect I-10 BL; former US 80 west
Pima	Tucson	255.26	410.80	I-10 east / I-10 BL end – Benson	Southern end of concurrency with I-10; exit 255 on I-10; northern end of concurrency with I-10 BL and northern terminus of I-10 BL
Overlap with I-10
Pinal		196.08– 196.02	315.56– 315.46	I-10 west / SR 84 begins – Casa Grande	Northern end of concurrency with I-10; exit 211 on I-10; southern end of concurrency with SR 84 and eastern terminus of SR 84; mileposts reflect SR 84
Pinal		195.36	314.40	SR 87 north – Coolidge	Southern terminus of SR 87
Pinal		183.24– 182.94	294.90– 294.41	I-10 – Phoenix, Tucson	I-10 exit 198
Pinal	Casa Grande	177.97 243.62	286.41 392.07	SR 84 west (Gila Bend Highway) / SR 287 east (Florence Boulevard) / SR 187 begins – Stanfield, Coolidge	Northern end of concurrency with SR 84; southern terminus of SR 187 and eastern terminus of SR 287; mileposts change to reflect SR 93
Pinal		235.09	378.34	I-10 east / SR 187 north – Chandler	Northern end of concurrency with SR 187; southern end of concurrency with I-10; exit 185 on I-10
Pinal	Overlap with I-10				
Pinal		225.14	362.33	I-10 west – Chandler	Northern end of concurrency with I-10; exit 175 on I-10
Maricopa	Chandler	218.59 159.82	351.79 257.21	SR 87 south – Coolidge	Southern end of concurrency with SR 87; mileposts change to reflect SR 87
Maricopa	Mesa	172.22	277.16	SR 360 (Superstition Freeway)	Interchange; exit 8 on SR 360
Maricopa	Mesa	174.23 179.03	280.40 288.12	US 60 east / US 89 south (Main Street east) / SR 87 north (Country Club Drive north) – Florence, Payson	Northern end of concurrency with SR 87; southern end of concurrency with US 60/US 89; Main St. east is former US 70 / US 80 east; mileposts change to reflect US 60
Maricopa	Tempe	171.49– 171.01	275.99– 275.21	Washington Street west	Interchange; northbound off-ramp was a left exit
Maricopa	Phoenix	168.72	271.53	I-10 BL east (44th Street)	Southern end of concurrency with I-10 BL
Maricopa	Phoenix	163.23	262.69	Southern terminus of SR 93 (1984-1991)	
Maricopa	Phoenix	163.23	262.69	I-10 BL west / SR 85 south (Van Buren Street west) / 7th Avenue	Northern end of concurrency with I-10 BL; northern terminus of SR 85 (former US 80 west)
Maricopa	Phoenix	160.72	258.65	I-17 (Black Canyon Freeway) – Flagstaff	Interchange
Maricopa	Phoenix	158.96	255.82	Indian School Road / 35th Avenue	Interchange with Indian School Road; at-grade intersection with 35th Avenue
Maricopa	Peoria	148.90	239.63	Loop 101 south (Agua Fria Freeway)	Loop 101 exit 11
Maricopa		120.11	193.30	SR 74 east (Morristown-New River Highway) – Carefree	Western terminus of SR 74
Maricopa	Wickenburg	110.93 252.04	178.52 405.62	US 60 west	Northern end of concurrency with US 60; southern end of concurrency with US 89; mileposts change to reflect US 89
Maricopa		257.99	415.19	US 89 / US 93 north – Prescott, Wikieup	Northern terminus; northern end of concurrency with US 89; southern terminus of US 93; highway continued as US 89/US 93 north
1.000 mi = 1.609 km; 1.000 km = 0.621 mi: Concurrency terminus

== See also ==
- Arizona State Route 84
- Arizona State Route 87
- U.S. Route 66 in Arizona
- U.S. Route 80 in Arizona
- U.S. Route 93 in Arizona
- Interstate 10 in Arizona
- Former state routes in Arizona
