= Arizona State Route 87 =

State highway in Arizona, United States

State Route 87
- SR 87 highlighted in red

Route information
- Maintained by ADOT, City of Chandler, City of Mesa, City of Winslow.
- Length: 272.66 mi (438.80 km)
- Existed: 1927–present

Major junctions
- South end: I-10 near Picacho
- Loop 202 in Chandler; US 60 in Mesa; Loop 202 in Mesa; SR 260 from Payson to near Strawberry; I-40 / US 180 in Winslow
- North end: SR 264 near Second Mesa

Location
- Country: United States
- State: Arizona
- Counties: Pinal, Maricopa, Gila, Coconino, Navajo

Highway system
- Arizona State Highway System; Interstate; US; State; Scenic Proposed; Former
← SR 86	→ SR 88

State Route 87 (SR 87) is a 272.66-mile (438.80 km) north–south highway that travels from I-10 near Picacho northward to State Route 264 near Second Mesa.

== Route description ==
SR 87 begins 0.95 miles (1.53 km) to the north of I-10 at a junction with an unsigned orphan segment of SR 84, which serves as a direct connection to I-10 at Exit 211. SR 87 travels north for 16 miles (26 km) toward Coolidge, passing by the town of Eloy. In Coolidge, State Route 87 is known as Arizona Boulevard.

The highway leaves Coolidge heading northwest and travels as a two-lane rural road through the Gila River Indian Community, until it reaches a junction with SR 587 on the border between the Gila River Indian Community and Chandler. North of this junction, SR 87 travels along Arizona Avenue in Chandler, intersecting Loop 202 before entering Mesa and becoming Country Club Drive. The highway then intersects with U.S. 60 and SR 202 for a second time, before leaving Mesa as the Beeline Highway. The Mesa and Chandler sections of SR 87 are discontinuous, with most of these sections between McKellips Road in Mesa and Cloud Road in Chandler being owned and maintained by their respective cities. A 1.5-mile (2.4 km) ADOT-owned segment north of the Western Canal and south of Baseline Road forms the city limits separating Mesa from Chandler, and also the city limits separating Gilbert from Mesa. The only major portions where SR 87 technically exists wholly inside Mesa city limits (under ADOT ownership) is the area surrounding US 60 and then a short length south of the Loop 202 Red Mountain Freeway north of McKellips Road.

SR 87 is known as the Beeline Highway from McDowell Road, just north of Mesa, passing by Fountain Hills and to Payson. This portion of SR 87 is entirely a four-lane highway. There is a stretch of road where the highway splits, taking different canyons through the Mazatzal Mountains south of Payson, near the junction with SR 188. The old alignment is currently the southbound lanes, while a new alignment was built for the northbound lanes. There is a stretch where the roads cross-over each other because of the difference in elevations of the two canyons.

The highway meets SR 260 in Payson. The two routes run concurrently for 25 miles (40 km) from Payson to just north of the Mogollon Rim. From there, SR 87 heads northeast towards Winslow, where it meets SR 99. The portion of SR 87 which runs along former Business Loop I-40 is owned by the City of Winslow and maintained by the city. Outside of Winslow, SR 87 has an interchange with I-40/US 180. SR 87 comes to its northern terminus at Arizona State Route 264 at Second Mesa, in the Hopi Reservation.

SR 87 is part of the National Highway System between I-10 and Payson.

== History ==
State Route 65
- Location: Strawberry Junction to Second Mesa
- Existed: 1936–1967

SR 87 was designated in 1924 from Casa Grande to Mesa. In 1927, it was rerouted to end in Eloy, and the old route was renumbered AZ 187. In 1959, it extended to Strawberry Junction. In 1967, it extended north over State Route 65 to its current terminus. By 1983, almost half of the Beeline Highway, between Mesa and Payson, had already been widened to either three or four lanes; in 1989, work began to convert the entire highway to four lanes, and was completed in 2001.

Notable destinations along SR 87 include the Mogollon Rim and Tonto Natural Bridge.

In the 1930s Harvey Bush championed a highway from Mesa to Payson, crossing the Mazatzal Mountains, which became known as the Bush Highway. In the 1950s a cutoff was built between Mesa and the Saguaro Lake turnoff, bypassing a slow section of the Bush Highway and shortening the trip by 15 minutes. This cutoff was dubbed the Beeline Highway, and the name gradually came to apply to the entire route.

== Gallery ==
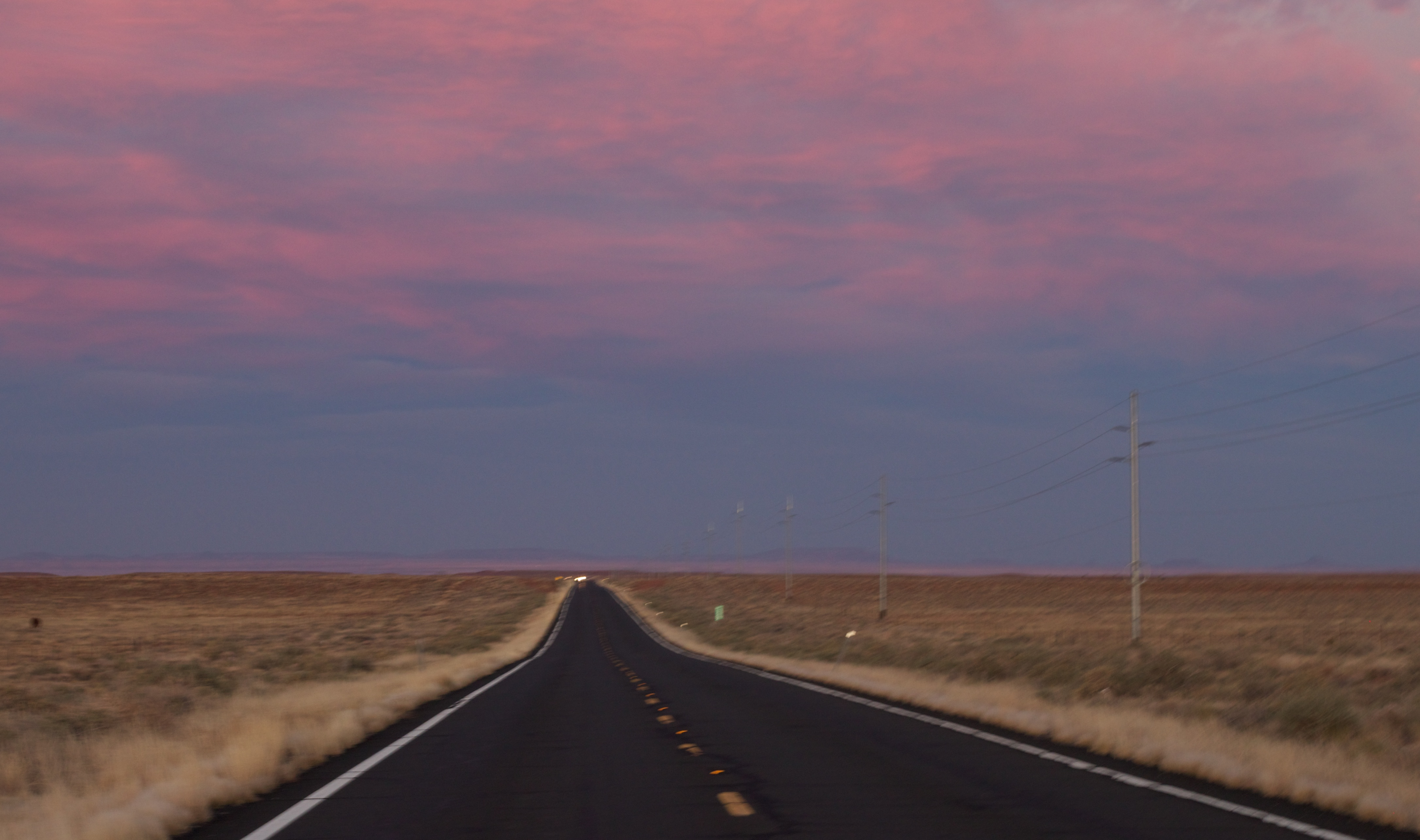
Driving south on AZ 87, from Winslow to Strawberry.

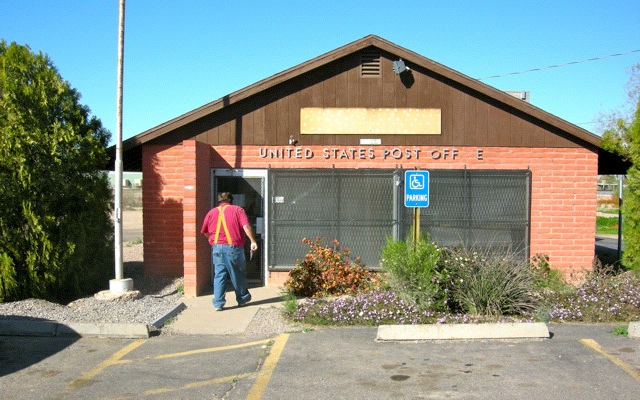
The Picacho post office, near the present southern terminus of AZ 87.

== Major intersections ==
County	Location	mi	km	Exit	Destinations	Notes
Pinal	Picacho	115.40	185.72		SR 84 east – Picacho I-10 – Tucson, Phoenix	ADOT signs this as southern terminus; south end of unsigned SR 84 concurrency; I-10 exit 211; highway continues as unsigned SR 84 east
Pinal	Picacho	115.40	185.72		Picacho	Closed interchange; was southbound exit only
Pinal	Picacho	115.77	186.31		SR 84 west (Casa Grande-Picacho Highway west)	North end of unsigned SR 84 concurrency; Casa Grande-Picacho Hwy. is former SR 93
Pinal		125.92	202.65		SR 287 west – Casa Grande	South end of SR 287 concurrency
Pinal	Coolidge	134.75	216.86		SR 287 east – Florence	North end of SR 287 concurrency
Pinal		141.48	227.69		SR 387 west to I-10	
Pinal		146.06	235.06		SR 187 south to I-10 – Casa Grande	
Pinal		156.10	251.22		Gilbert Road – Queen Creek, Gilbert	
Pinal–Maricopa county line		159.70	257.01		SR 587 south to I-10	Former SR 93
Maricopa	Chandler	161.18	259.39		Cloud Road	North end state maintenance
Maricopa	Chandler	N/A			Loop 202 (SanTan Freeway)	Loop 202 exit 47
Maricopa	Chandler–Mesa line	170.20	273.91		Bridge over Western Canal; South end state maintenance	
Maricopa	Gilbert–Mesa line	171.75	276.40		Baseline Road	North end state maintenance
Maricopa	Mesa	172.33	277.34		Iron Avenue	South end state maintenance
Maricopa	Mesa	172.45	277.53		US 60 (Superstition Freeway) – Globe, Phoenix	Former SR 360; US 60 exit 179
Maricopa	Mesa	172.57	277.72		Holmes Avenue	North end state maintenance
Maricopa	Mesa	N/A			Broadway Road	Partial interchange; access via northbound exit ramp and connector road
Maricopa	Mesa	N/A			Main Street (Historic US 80)	Former US 60 / US 70 / US 80 / US 89; former SR 93 north
Maricopa	Mesa	176.74	284.44		McKellips Road	South end state maintenance
Maricopa	Mesa	176.99– 177.01	284.84– 284.87		Loop 202 (Red Mountain Freeway)	Loop 202 exit 13
Maricopa		199.15	320.50	199	Bush Highway	Interchange
Gila		235.69	379.31		SR 188 south – Roosevelt, Globe	
Gila	Payson	252.58	406.49		SR 260 east – Heber, Show Low, Holbrook	South end of SR 260 concurrency
Mogollon Rim					Gila–Coconino county line	
Coconino		278.51	448.22		SR 260 west – Cottonwood, Camp Verde	North end of SR 260 concurrency
Coconino		290.45	467.43		CR 3 north (Lake Mary Road) – Flagstaff	
Navajo		340.94	548.69		SR 99 south	South end of SR 99 concurrency
Navajo	Winslow	342.16	550.65		SR 99 (2nd Street)	One-way street; inbound access only
Navajo	Winslow	342.16	550.65		SR 99 north (3rd Street west) – Flagstaff	One-way street; outbound access only; north end state maintenance; north end of SR 99 concurrency; no northbound access
Navajo	Winslow	343.56	552.91		Transcon Lane to I-40 (US 180) – Albuquerque, Flagstaff	South end state maintenance; I-40 exit 255; former BL 40 east
Navajo		345.76	556.45		I-40 (US 180) – Flagstaff, Albuquerque	I-40 exit 257
Navajo	Second Mesa	406.04	653.46		SR 264 – Tuba City, Keams Canyon	Northern terminus
1.000 mi = 1.609 km; 1.000 km = 0.621 mi: Closed/former; Concurrency terminus
