= Arizola, Arizona =

- Populated place
- Location of Arizola in Arizona
- Coordinates: 32°51′04″N 111°42′51″W
- Country: United States
- State: Arizona
- County: Pinal
- Elevation: 1,437 ft (438 m)
- Time zone: UTC-7 (Mountain (MST))
  - Summer (DST): UTC-7 (MST)
- ZIP codes: 85122
- Area code: 520
- FIPS code: 04-03460
- GNIS feature ID: 765

Arizola is a populated place situated in Pinal County, Arizona, United States. It has an estimated elevation of 1,437 feet (438 m) above sea level.

The community was named by combining Arizona and Ola Thomas, the daughter of an early settler.

== History ==
Arizola's population was 20 in the 1960 census. The town was the center of an attempted swindle by James Addison Reavis, the so-called "Baron of Arizona". Reavis claimed to own all water and minerals in a purported Spanish land grant.
