= Perryville, Arizona =

Unincorporated community in Maricopa County, Arizona, US

- Unincorporated community
- Interactive map of Perryville, Arizona
- Coordinates: 33°26′08″N 112°27′41″W
- Country: United States
- State: Arizona
- County: Maricopa
- Established: August 25, 1926

Government

Area
  - Total: 0.0039 sq mi (0.01 km^{2})
  - Land: 0.0039 sq mi (0.01 km^{2})
  - Water: 0 sq mi (0 km^{2})
- Elevation: 978 ft (298 m)
- Time zone: UTC-7 (Mountain (MST))
- ZIP codes: 85338
- Area code: 623
- GNIS feature ID: 9336

Perryville is a former unincorporated community in Maricopa County, Arizona, United States located at the northeastern corner of what is now Perryville Road and Yuma Road in unincorporated Goodyear, Arizona.

Perryville was established by Perry Carmean (1877–1980), an emigrant from Van Wert, Ohio, who moved to Phoenix in 1922, renting a property at 809 West Jefferson according to voter registration records and working as a laborer according to the 1925 City Directory. He bought his first property at a homesite in the Phoenix area in the University Addition northwest of 7th Avenue and Van Buren in April 1926, but did not stay long, purchasing the first lot of what would be named Perryville on August 25, 1926. He established a service station by July 1927 and listed his occupation in the 1930 US Census as a carpenter with other income. Carmean continued to buy and rent property, finally leasing the townsite in 1941 and selling it in 1945.

Perryville grew slowly, eventually reaching a size of two acres at the time of its sale. At that point there were several cottages according to the 1946 topographical map but were demolished thereafter. A 30-space trailer park was built in 1969, the last property constructed on the settlement. The service station is still in business, a cafe was later converted to a used car dealership.
