= Arizona State Route 287 =

State highway in Arizona, United States

State Route 287
- SR 287 highlighted in red

Route information
- Maintained by ADOT, City of Casa Grande
- Length: 26.61 mi (42.82 km)
- Existed: 1932–present

Major junctions
- West end: I-10 in Casa Grande
- SR 87 in Coolidge
- East end: SR 79 Bus. in Florence

Location
- Country: United States
- State: Arizona
- Counties: Pinal

Highway system
- Arizona State Highway System; Interstate; US; State; Scenic Proposed; Former
← SR 286	→ SR 288

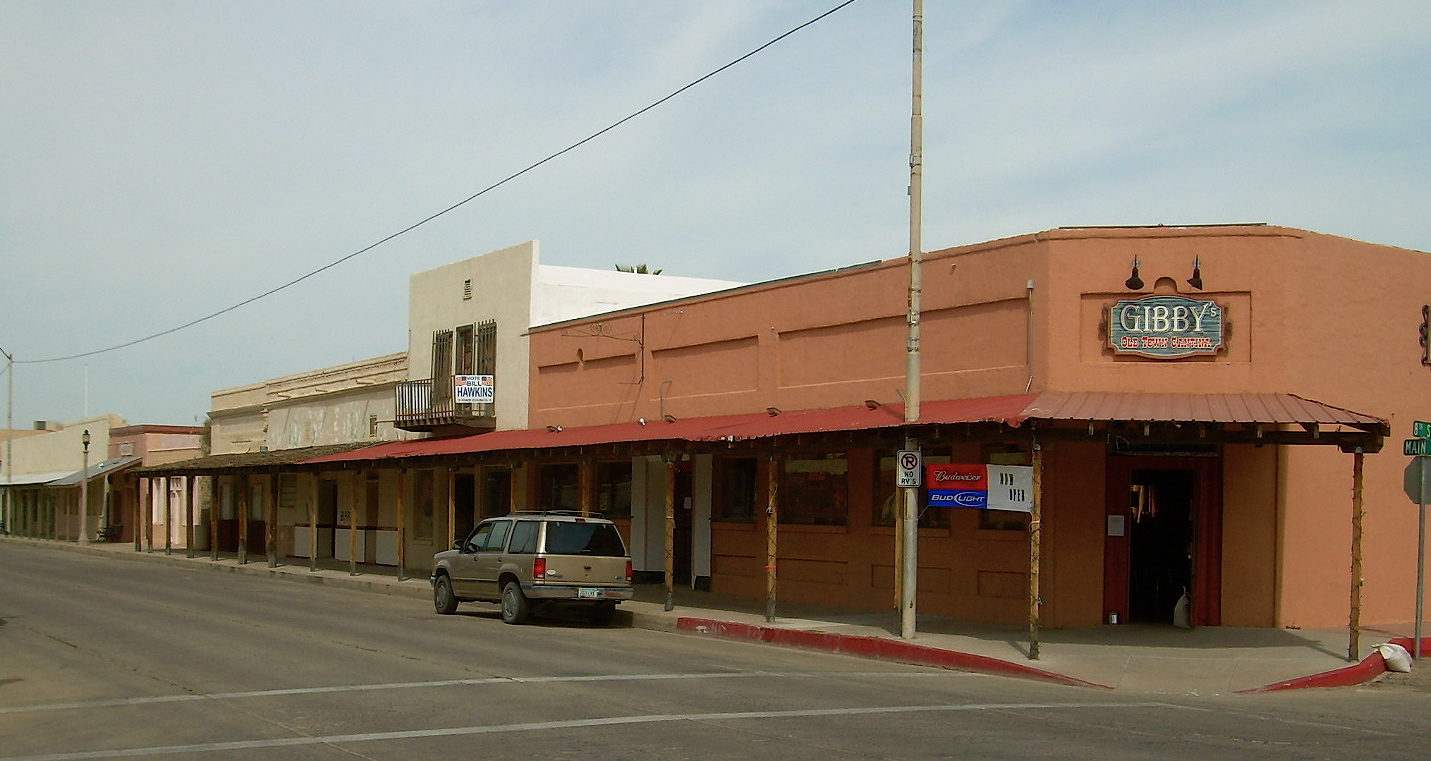
SR 287, the Florence-Coolidge Highway, in downtown Florence.

State Route 287, also known as SR 287, is a predominantly east–west state highway in central Arizona. Originally, this highway number only applied to Florence-Coolidge Highway; the branch to Casa Grande was added later.

== Route description ==
SR 287 begins in Casa Grande at an interchange with I-10 near the eastern end of town. The route proceeds eastbound until it overlaps State Route 87 as Arizona Boulevard. The highway travels several miles directly north to Coolidge, until splitting from SR 87 and diverging eastward to Florence, where it terminates at SR 79B.

== History ==
The route between Florence and Coolidge was numbered as SR 287 in 1932. At that time, it was an unpaved road. By 1934, it was paved in the segment it was designated. In 1961, the section to Casa Grande was added to the designation.

== Junction list ==
The entire route is in Pinal County.

Location	mi	km	Destinations	Notes
Casa Grande	0.00	0.00	I-10 – Tucson, Phoenix	Western terminus; I-10 exit 194; road continues as Florence Boulevard (former SR 287 west)
	10.00	16.09	SR 87 south – Picacho	West end of SR 87 concurrency
Coolidge	18.58	29.90	SR 87 north – Mesa	East end of SR 87 concurrency
Florence	26.61	42.82	SR 79 Bus. (Historic US 80) to SR 79 south – Florence, Tucson	Roundabout; eastern terminus
1.000 mi = 1.609 km; 1.000 km = 0.621 mi: Concurrency terminus
