= Unconstructed state routes in Arizona =

Highway system

Unconstructed Routes in the Arizona State Highway System
- Example signage of unconstructed routes

Highway names
- Interstates: Interstate X (I-X)
- US Highways: U.S. Route X (US X)
- State: State Route X (SR X)

System links
- Arizona State Highway System; Interstate; US; State; Scenic Proposed; Former

Below is a list and summary of the unconstructed state highways in the U.S. state of Arizona. Some are currently proposed while the others have since been cancelled prior to being constructed.

== State Route 30 ==
State Route 30
- Location: Phoenix

State Route 30 (formerly State Route 801), also known as the I-10 Reliever, is a planned state highway in the southwest parts of Phoenix, Arizona and nearby suburbs. It will connect the southern terminus of Loop 303 with the South Mountain leg of Loop 202. It is planned as a controlled-access freeway to relieve heavy traffic congestion experienced along Interstate 10 in the area.

== State Route 50 ==
State Route 50
- Location: Phoenix to Glendale

State Route 50, also known as the Paradise Parkway, was a proposed urban freeway through Glendale and Phoenix. Originally proposed in 1968 as SR 317, the freeway would have run east to west, connecting the future State Route 51 and Loop 101, while running roughly parallel to, and 4 miles (6.4 km) north of, I-10 in the vicinity of Camelback Road. The proposed freeway was reassigned as SR 50 in 1987. As the proposed freeway would have crossed through largely developed land and densely populated neighborhoods, it proved to be both extremely expensive and highly unpopular. The route was eventually struck from state planning maps and all land acquired for right-of-way was subsequently sold, the funds being used to pay for other transportation projects.

== U.S. Route 87 ==
U.S. Route 87
- Location: New Mexico to Elfrida (First proposal); New Mexico to Douglas (Second proposal)

U.S. Route 87W
- Location: Elfrida to Nogales

U.S. Route 87E
- Location: Elfrida to Douglas

U.S. Route 87 (US 87) was a proposed extension of US 87 into eastern Arizona. The proposal also included two split routes which would have been designated U.S. Route 87W (US 87W) and U.S. Route 87E (US 87E). The proposed US 87 was created by the Tombstone, Arizona based Border-Sunshine Way Association after a meeting in Tucson and was presented to the Arizona State Highway Department on November 3, 1931. Outside Arizona the proposed extension of US 87 would have been extended from its southern terminus in Rawlins, Wyoming through Colorado and New Mexico to Arizona. This would have established concurrencies with US 30, US 40S, US 50, US 550, US 450 and US 66 as well as replacing US 666 between Cortez, Colorado and Gallup, New Mexico.

US 87 would have entered Arizona from New Mexico on present day State Route 61 near Zuni, New Mexico, running southwest to St. Johns. It would have run concurrent with the original US 70 between St. Johns and Springerville, Arizona. From Springerville, it would have been concurrent with US 60 heading east to SR 71 (now US 191), then would have replaced SR 71 between US 60 and US 180 (the current US 70). US 87 would have been concurrent with US 180 west to Safford, where it would have then replaced SR 81 (now US 191) through Willcox to a junction near Elfrida. The proposed US 87W would have started from US 87 and US 87E near Elfrida, then would have taken Gleeson Road west through Gleeson to Tombstone. US 87W would have had a wrong-way concurrency with US 80 from Tombstone to SR 82. US 87W would have then replaced the entirety of SR 82 between Tombstone Junction and Nogales, establishing a western terminus at US 89. US 87E would have replaced the remainder of SR 81 between Elfrida and Douglas.

The Arizona State Highway Department approved the proposal in 1934 and tried to get US 87 extended into Arizona. The proposed extension of US 87 was ultimately unsuccessful and US 87 was not extended into Arizona by 1935. In an ironic twist, US 666 was extended into Arizona in 1942 along the previously proposed US 87 and US 87E to Douglas. Just 11 years earlier, the US 87 proposal had attempted to replace all of US 666 between Colorado and New Mexico. The Arizona State Highway Department tried a final time in 1943 to extend US 87 into Arizona and requested US 87 replace all of the newly extended US 666 south to Douglas. The attempt was once again unsuccessful, as by 1946, US 666 was still designated between New Mexico and Douglas.

== U.S. Route 93T ==
U.S. Route 93T
- Location: Kingman to Wickenburg

U.S. Route 93T was a proposed temporary extension of US 93 following US 66 and US 89 from Kingman to Wickenburg while the final route of US 93 was to be constructed through Wikieup. The idea was abandoned in 1937, the same year it was proposed. The proposal for US 93 to be extended past Kingman towards Phoenix was denied by the AASHO also in 1937. It wouldn't be until 1965 that US 93 would exist south of Kingman.

Browse numbered routes
← US 93A	US 93T	→ US 95

== State Route 176 ==
State Route 176
- Location: San Manuel to Benson

State Route 176 was a proposed state highway in eastern central Arizona, that would have connected I-10 in Benson and SR 76 in San Manuel. It was designated in 1967 but was never built, and was cancelled in 1970. The proposed route was added to SR 76. It would have followed the San Pedro River on its entire length.

Browse numbered routes
← SR 173	SR 176	→ SR 177

== U.S. Route 193 ==
U.S. Route 193
- Location: Sacaton to Picacho

U.S. Route 193 was a proposed U.S. Highway highway that would have taken over the route of SR 87, SR 187 and SR 84 between Sacaton and Picacho, via Casa Grande. It was proposed by the Arizona Highway Department as a branch of a proposed extension of US 93 at the time. By 1937, the route was briefly redesignated US 93A before the proposal was subsequently dropped. The proposed extension of mainline US 93 was denied by the AASHO the same year.

Browse numbered routes
← SR 93	US 93A	→ US 93T
← US 191	US 193	→ SR 195

== State Route 380 ==
State Route 380
- Location: St. Johns to New Mexico

State Route 380 was a proposed state route that was never constructed in the eastern part of the state of Arizona. It was proposed, starting in the town of St. Johns and would have ended at the New Mexico state line. It shows up on some state maps starting in 1970, but was never built. The road proposed is currently a dirt ranch road. In St. John's, it would have begun at a junction with U.S. Route 180, a child of U.S. Route 80. It would have connected with the recently cancelled NM 191.

Browse numbered routes
← SR 377	SR 380	→ SR 386

== State Route 487 ==
State Route 487
- Location: Flagstaff to SR 87

State Route 487 was a state route that never materialized in the north-central part of Arizona. The Arizona Department of Transportation added it the state highway system in 1967 between Flagstaff and State Route 87 near Happy Jack. It did show on state maps during the early 1970s, but the route disappeared in the mid to late '70s. The road currently exists today as Coconino County Road 3.

Browse numbered routes
← SR 473	SR 487	→ SR 504

== Interstate 710 ==
Interstate 710
- Location: Tucson

Interstate 710 (I-710) was proposed to follow the current alignment of the Kino Parkway, an at-grade parkway, between Broadway Road and I-10 in Tucson, Arizona, but it was never built. This freeway, if built, would have served the downtown area, the University of Arizona campus, and the industrial area between the railroad and I-10; an extension to Tucson International Airport. It first appeared on a Tucson map in 1971. Strong community opposition to freeways in Tucson was a major reason for cancellation of the project on April 16, 1982; the Tucson area has long been opposed to the rapid urban sprawl since.
