= List of Interstate Highways in Arizona =

Interstate Highways of the Arizona State Highway System
- Example signage from Arizona's Interstate System
- Interstate Highways highlighted in red Active business routes highlighted in blue

System information
- Maintained by ADOT
- Length: 1,169.17 mi (1,881.60 km) Business Routes not included
- Formed: 1957

Highway names
- Interstates: Interstate X (I-X)
- US Highways: U.S. Route X (US X)
- State: State Route X (SR X)

System links
- Arizona State Highway System; Interstate; US; State; Scenic Proposed; Former

The Interstate Highways in Arizona are the segments of the Dwight D. Eisenhower System of Interstate and Defense Highways that are owned and maintained by the U.S. state of Arizona, totaling about 1,169 miles (1,881 km). Arizona has a total of six Interstate Highways, all of which are mainline highways; there are no auxiliary highways. The longest Interstate in Arizona is Interstate 10 (I-10), which traverses east-west through the southern and central parts of the state, serving Phoenix and Tucson. There are also a total of fourteen active business routes and eight former routes, which were either business loops or spurs for all main highways except I-15. All of Arizona's existing Interstate Highways have overtaken or replaced some U.S. Routes, which either involved decommissioning or running concurrent with the existing route.

The Arizona Department of Transportation (ADOT) is the agency responsible for building and maintaining the Interstate Highways in the Arizona State Highway System. These highways are built to Interstate Highway standards, which are freeways that have a 75-mile-per-hour (121 km/h) speed limit in rural areas and a 65 mph (105 km/h) speed limit in urban areas. The numbering scheme used to designate the Interstates was developed by the American Association of State Highway and Transportation Officials (AASHTO), an organization composed of various state departments of transportation in the United States.

== Description ==
The Interstate Highway System currently covers 1,169 miles (1,881 km) of interstate highway in Arizona, which only consists of primary highways, which are the two-digit routes and I-8. There are no auxiliary interstates within the state, which are three-digit routes. The only auxiliary Interstate that has existed in Arizona was I-410, which was an inner loop route in Phoenix. It later became part of I-10 as I-10 was rerouted and the old route became part of I-17. The longest Interstate in Arizona is I-10, which spans 392.33 miles (631.39 km) across southern and central Arizona, and the shortest Interstate is I-15, which only traverses the northwestern corner of the state, running from Nevada to Utah, spanning only 29.39 miles (47.30 km). I-11 is a proposed Interstate that is currently in its planning phase and is expected to run from the Hoover Dam to Nogales. It is planned to overtake U.S. Route 93 (US 93). There are also 14 active business routes within the state. All current Interstate Highways have had business routes except for I-15, which never had a business route designated. I-17's only business route located in Black Canyon City was decommissioned in 2011, joining I-15 as the only two routes without a business route.

== List ==
Number	Length (mi)	Length (km)	Southern or western terminus	Northern or eastern terminus	Formed	Removed	Notes
I-8	178.33	286.99	I-8 at the California state line	I-10 in Casa Grande	1958	current	Replaced US 80 and SR 84
I-10	392.33	631.39	I-10 at the California state line	I-10 at the New Mexico state line	1960	current	Replaced US 60, US 70, SR 93, SR 84, US 80 and SR 86
I-11	—	—	Fed. 15D at Mariposa Port of Entry on United States-Mexico border	I-11/US 93 at the Nevada state line	proposed	—	Will replace US 93
I-15	29.39	47.30	I-15 at the Nevada state line	I-15 at the Utah state line	1962	current	Replaced US 91
I-17	145.76	234.58	I-10 / US 60 in Phoenix	I-40 in Flagstaff	1957	current	Replaced US 89, SR 79 and SR 69
I-19	63.35	101.95	I-19 BL in Nogales	I-10 at Tucson	1963	current	Replaced US 89 and SR 93
I-40	359.48	578.53	I-40 at the California state line	I-40 at the New Mexico state line	1962	current	Replaced US 66 and US 89
I-410	0.65	1.05	I-10 in Phoenix	Buckeye Road in Phoenix	1969	1971	Renumbered I-10; former I-10 became an extended I-17.
I-510	0.65	1.05	I-10 in Phoenix	Buckeye Road in Phoenix	1958	1969	Renumbered SR 51.
I-710	—	—	I-10 in Tucson	I-10 in Tucson	1971	1982	Proposed, but it never materialized; what would have been I-710 became today's Kino Parkway.
Former; Proposed and unbuilt

== Business routes ==
All state designated Interstate Business Loops are internally designated as State Route Business Loops by ADOT, being referred to throughout ADOT ArcGIS data and state highway logs as such. For example, all currently state designated I-10 Business Loops in Arizona are referred to as "SB010" which is the Arizona Transportation Information System (ATIS) code for "State Business Route 10" or "SR 10B" for short.

Number	Length (mi)	Length (km)	Southern or western terminus	Northern or eastern terminus	Formed	Removed	Notes
BL 8	12.23	19.68	I-8 Bus. at the California state line	I-8 east of Yuma	1966	current	Former US 80
BL 8	5.96	9.59	I-8 west of Gila Bend	I-8 east of Gila Bend	1973	current	Former US 80 and SR 84
BL 10	2.91	4.68	I-10 west of Quartzsite	I-10 east of Quartzsite	1974	current	Former US 60/US 70
BL 10	—	—	I-10 at 27th Avenue in Phoenix	I-10 at 48th Street in Phoenix	—	1990	
BL 10	5.75	9.25	I-10 and Park Avenue in Tucson	I-10 east of Tucson	1972	2001	Former US 80/SR 86
BL 10	3.51	5.65	I-10 west of Benson	I-10 east of Benson	1974	current	Former US 80/SR 86
BS 10	0.55	0.89	I-10 north of Benson	I-10 BL in Benson	1969	1999	Ocotillo Road in Benson
BL 10	8.33	13.41	I-10 west of Willcox	I-10 east of Willcox	1974	current	Former US 666/SR 86
BL 10	4.41	7.10	I-10 west of Bowie	I-10 east of Bowie	1974	current	Former SR 86
BL 10	3.90	6.28	I-10 west of San Simon	I-10 east of San Simon	1974	current	Former SR 86
BL 17	3.00	4.83	I-17 in Black Canyon City	I-17 in Black Canyon City	—	2011	Former SR 69
BL 19	5.88	9.46	I-19 north of Nogales	Fed. 15 at the Mexican border	1992	current	Former US 89/SR 93
BL 19	20.24	32.57	I-19 in Green Valley	I-10 in South Tucson	1992	2004	Former US 89/SR 93
BL 40	0.55 (Note: Only the beginning and ending segments of BL 40 were maintained by ADOT at the very end of its existence, hence the low recorded mileage.)	0.89	I-40/US 93 west of Kingman	I-40/US 93 east of Kingman	1984	2009	Former US 66/US 93
BL 40	4.25	6.84	I-40 southwest of Seligman	I-40 southeast of Seligman	1984	current	Section of the route is former US 66
BL 40	1.49	2.40	I-40 west of Ash Fork	I-40/SR 89 east of Ash Fork	1984	current	Former US 66/US 89
BL 40	3.98	6.41	I-40 west of Williams	I-40/SR 64 east of Williams	1984	1990	Former US 66/US 89
BL 40	9.67	15.56	I-40 west of Flagstaff	I-40/US 180 in Flagstaff	1988	current	Former US 66/US 89
BL 40	0.87	1.40	I-40 BL/US 180 in Flagstaff	I-40/US 180 east of Flagstaff	2002	2008	Former US 66/US 180
BL 40	3.63	5.84	I-40/US 180/SR 99 west of Winslow	I-40/US 180/SR 87 east of Winslow	1980	2007	Former US 66/US 180
BS 40	1.20	1.93	SR 99 (3rd Street) in Winslow	Winslow Industrial Spur west of Winslow	1974	current	Former US 66/US 180
BL 40	6.83	10.99	I-40/US 180 west of Joseph City	I-40/US 180 east of Joseph City	1984	current	Former US 66/US 180
BL 40	15.47	24.90	I-40/US 180 west of Holbrook	I-40/SR 77 east of Holbrook	1984	current	Former US 66
Former
