= Transportation in Phoenix, Arizona =

Overview of transportation in Phoenix

Transportation in Phoenix, Arizona, is primarily via private cars. Public transport is run under the brand Valley Metro, and consists of buses, as well as a light rail and streetcar system.

== Roads ==
Phoenix auto traffic depends on both freeways and surface streets. Freeways fall under the auspices of the Arizona Department of Transportation (ADOT). Phoenix ranks first in the nation in the quality of its urban freeways, and the state as a whole ranks first in the nation in the quality of bridges. While being the fifth most populous city in the nation, Phoenix's freeways do not suffer from the same type of congestion seen in other large cities. In fact, in a recent study, there is not a single stretch of freeway in Phoenix ranked in the 100 worst freeways for either congestion or unreliability.

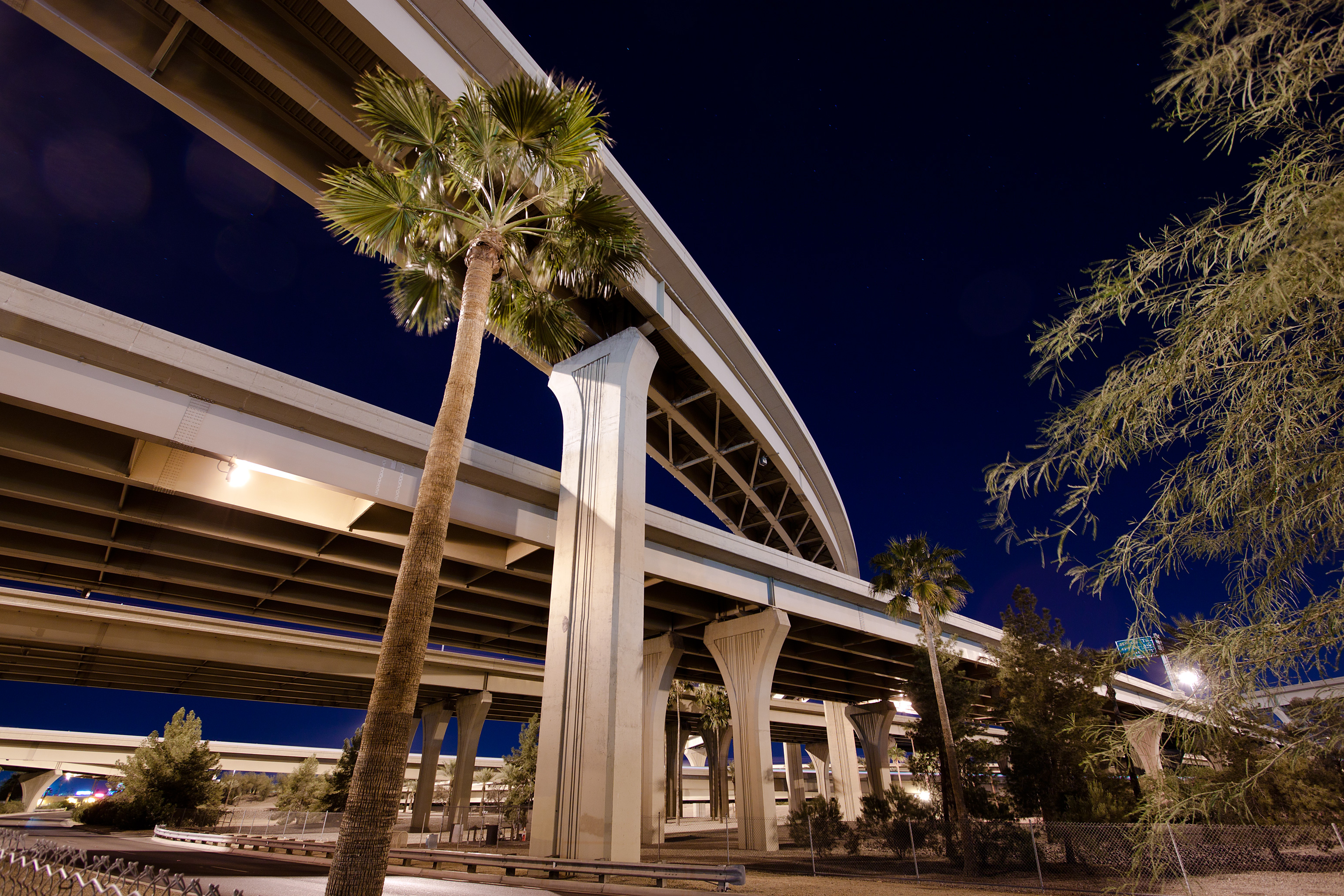
The Stack (Interstates 10 and 17) interchange at night in 2012

Part of the reason for this is the extensive freeway system in the city, due to most of that system being funded by local, rather than federal funds, through a half-cent general sales tax measure approved by voters in 1985. Another offshoot of this local funding is that Phoenix is the largest city in the United States to have at least two Interstate Highways, but no three-digit interstates.

As of 2005, the metropolitan area of Phoenix contains one of the nation's largest and fastest growing freeway systems, consisting of over 1,405 lane miles (2,261 lane km). The freeway system is a mix of Interstate, U.S., and state highways which include Interstate 10, Interstate 17, US 60, Loop 101, Loop 202, SR 51, SR 143, and Loop 303. There are still major additions to routes 101, 202 and 303 underway, as well as several other smaller projects around the valley. State Routes 87, 85, and 74 connect Phoenix with other areas of the Valley and Arizona.

The street system in Phoenix (and some of its suburbs) is laid out in a grid system, with most roads oriented either north–south or east–west, and the zero point of the grid being the intersection of Central Avenue and Washington Street. The one notable exception to this is the diagonal Grand Avenue, which runs northwest–southeast. The original plan was for the east–west streets to be named after U.S. Presidents, with the north–south streets named after Native Americans; but the north–south streets were quickly changed to numbers, with numbered Avenues running to the west of Central, and numbered Streets to its east. Major arterial streets are spaced one mile (1.6 km) apart, divided into smaller blocks approximately every 1/8 mile (200 m). For example, Scottsdale Road, being the 7200 block east, lies nine miles (14 km) to the east of Central Avenue (72 / 8).

Freeways and state highways in Phoenix:

- I-10
- I-17
- SR 51
- US 60
- SR 85
- Loop 101
- SR 143
- Loop 202
- Loop 303

== Air ==
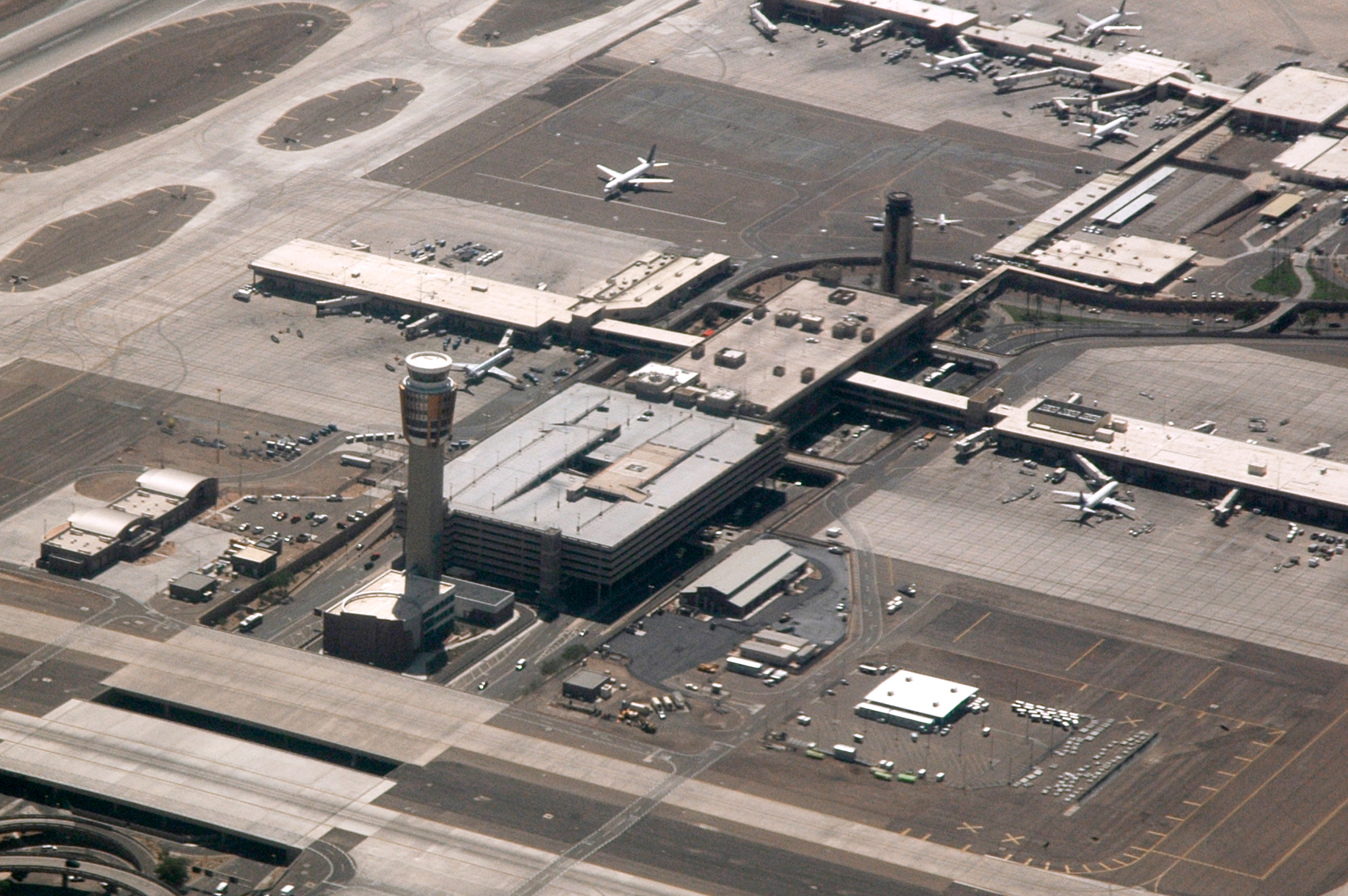
An aerial view of the control tower at Phoenix Sky Harbor that began operations on January 17, 2007

Phoenix Sky Harbor International Airport (IATA: PHX, ICAO: KPHX), one of the ten busiest airports in the United States, serves over 110,000 people on over 1000 flights per day. Centrally located in the metro area near several major freeway interchanges east of downtown Phoenix, the airport serves more than 100 cities with non-stop flights.

Air Canada, British Airways, China Airlines, Condor, Volaris, and WestJet are among several international carriers as well as American carrier American Airlines (which maintains a hub at the airport) that provide flights to destinations such as Canada, Costa Rica, Mexico, and London. In addition to American, other domestic carriers include Alaska Airlines, Delta, Frontier, Hawaiian, JetBlue, Southwest, Spirit, Sun Country, and United.

The Phoenix-Mesa Gateway Airport (IATA: AZA, ICAO: KIWA) in neighboring Mesa also serves the area's commercial air traffic. It was converted from Williams Air Force Base, which closed in 1993. The airport has recently received substantial commercial service with Allegiant Air opening a hub operation at the airport with non-stop service to over a dozen destinations.

Smaller airports that primarily handle private and corporate jets include Phoenix Deer Valley Airport, in the Deer Valley district of north Phoenix, and Scottsdale Airport, just east of the Phoenix/Scottsdale border. There are also other municipal airports including Chandler Municipal Airport, Glendale Municipal Airport, Falcon Field Airport in Mesa, and Phoenix Goodyear Airport.

== Rail ==
=== Intercity ===
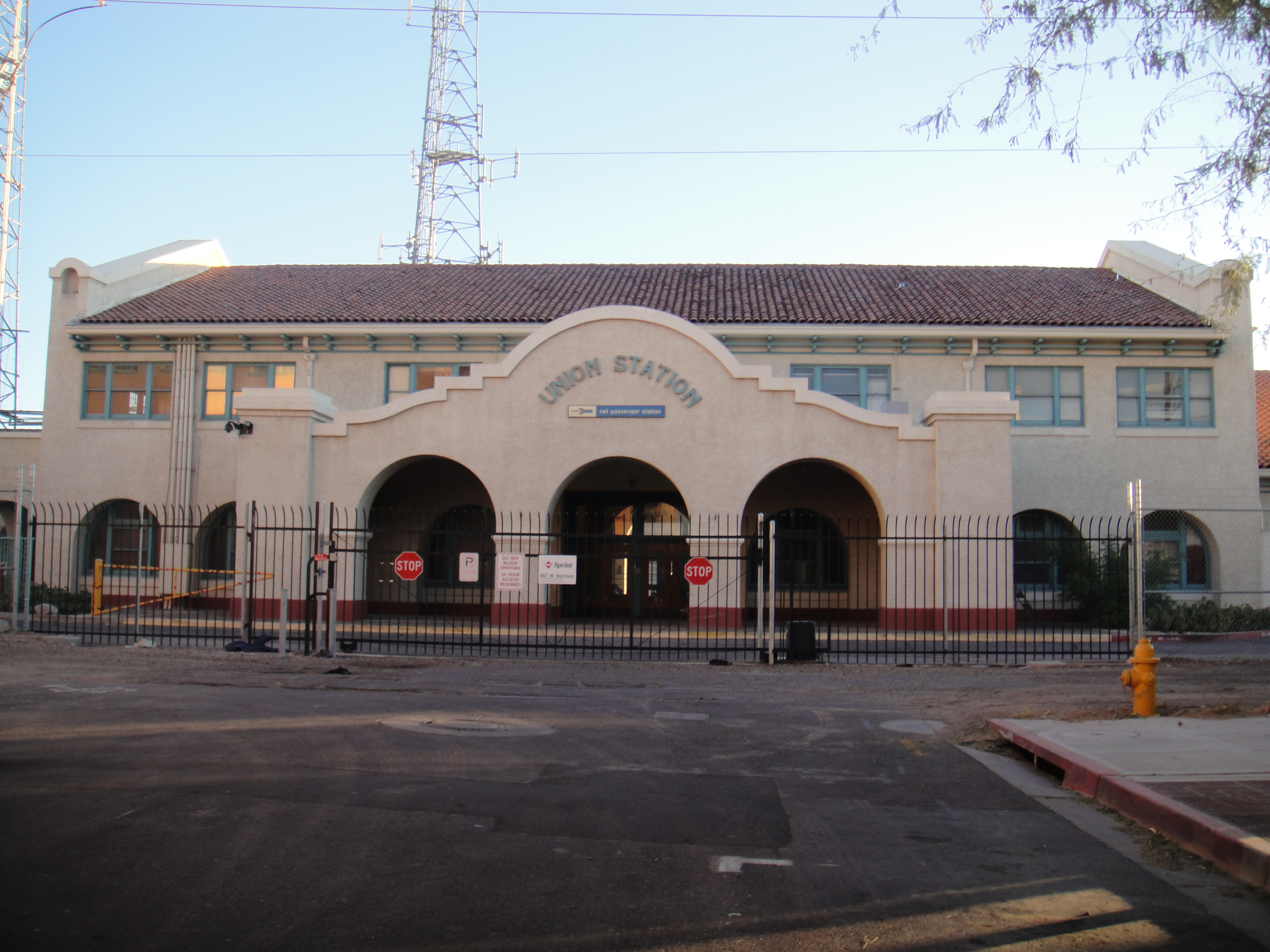
Union Station Phoenix – 2009

Amtrak served Phoenix Union Station until 1996 when the Union Pacific Railroad (UP) proposed abandoning the route between Yuma, Arizona, and Phoenix. Amtrak rerouted trains to Maricopa, 30 miles (48 km) south of downtown Phoenix, where passengers can board the Texas Eagle (Los Angeles-San Antonio-Chicago) and Sunset Limited (Los Angeles-New Orleans). UP retained the trackage and the station remains. In 2021, Amtrak developed a plan to bring rail service back to Phoenix with connections to Tucson and Los Angeles. This service is supported by the Bipartisan infrastructure bill and could take several years for service to be implemented. There have also been many proposals for Phoenix metro commuter rail.

=== Light rail and streetcar ===
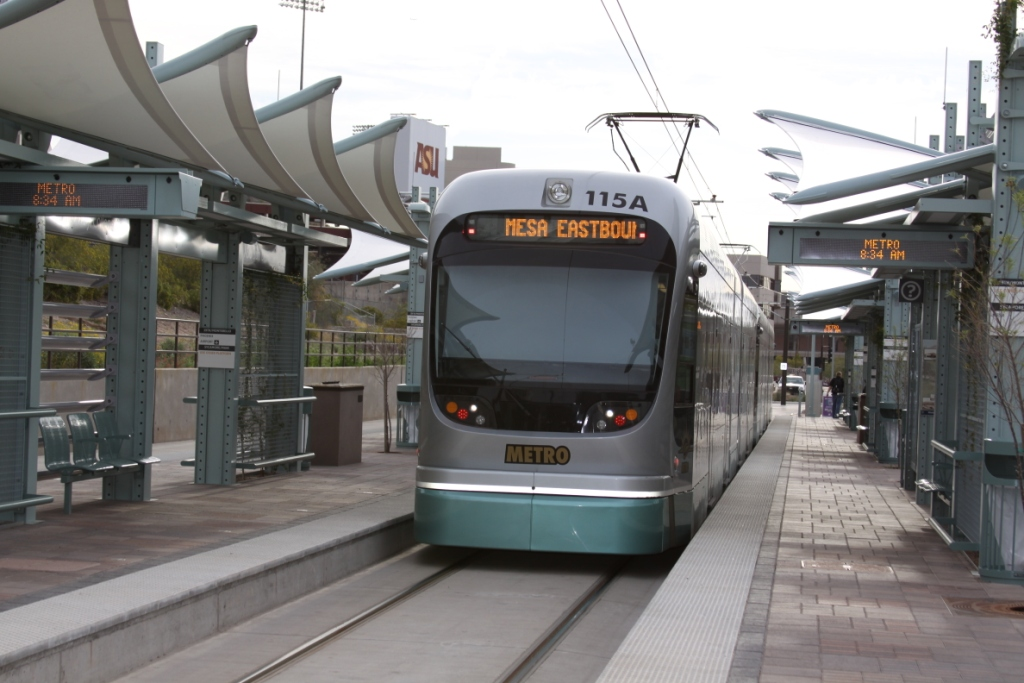
Valley Metro Rail station – 2009

Valley Metro provides public transportation throughout the metropolitan area, with its trains, buses, and a ride-share program. 3.38% of workers commute by public transit. Valley Metro's 38.5-mile (62.0 km) light rail and streetcar system called Valley Metro Rail & Streetcar consists of two light rail lines; the A and B lines, as well as the S Line streetcar. Two light rail extensions of more than 10.8 miles (17.4 km) are planned to open by 2030. The first segment of the light rail opened December 27, 2008.

== Intercity buses ==
Amtrak Thruway buses connect Phoenix Sky Harbor International Airport to Flagstaff for connection with the Los Angeles-Chicago Southwest Chief.

Phoenix is served by intercity bus services run by Greyhound, which stops at 24th Street near the airport, and Flixbus.

== Cycling ==
The Maricopa Association of Governments has a bicycle advisory committee working to improve conditions for bicycling on city streets and off-road paths.
