= Roads and freeways in metropolitan Phoenix =

Regional highway network

Map of freeways and major highways in the Phoenix area: Interstate Highways; U.S. Highways; State highways; State loops; Other freeways/highways

The metropolitan area of Phoenix in the U.S. state of Arizona contains one of the nation's largest and fastest-growing freeway systems, with over 1,405 lane miles (2,261 km) as of 2005 (this was before construction on the Loop 303 started).

Due to the lack of any form of mass transit besides bus prior to 2008, the Phoenix Metropolitan Area has remained a very automobile-dependent city, with its first freeway opening in 1958—a year preceding most cities' first freeway openings. Coupled with the explosive growth of the region and adequate funding, the result is one of the nation's most expansive freeway networks.

The backbone of Phoenix's freeway system is composed of three major freeways—Interstate 10, Interstate 17, and U.S. Route 60. Interstate 10, being a transcontinental route between California and Florida, is the most heavily traveled freeway in the Valley of the Sun. Interstate 17 runs down the center of Arizona, connecting Phoenix with Sedona, Prescott, Flagstaff and the Grand Canyon. U.S. Route 60 spans most of the country, but is only a freeway for a few short stints, one of them being in the East Valley. West of Phoenix, it shuttles travelers to cities such as Wickenburg, Kingman and Las Vegas (by way of a connection in Wickenburg with U.S. Route 93). In addition to these three freeways, three beltways, Routes 101, 202, and 303 loop around Phoenix, the East Valley, and the West Valley, respectively. State Route 51 connects Downtown with the northern reaches of the city, and Arizona State Route 143 is a distributor for Phoenix Sky Harbor International Airport.

== Overview ==
Freeways fall under the auspices of the Arizona Department of Transportation (ADOT). Phoenix ranks first in the nation in the quality of its urban freeways, and the state as a whole ranks first in the nation in the quality of bridges. While being the fifth most populous city in the nation, Phoenix's freeways do not suffer from the same type of congestion seen in other large cities. In fact, in a recent study, there is not a single stretch of freeway in Phoenix ranked in the 100 worst freeways for either congestion or unreliability.

=== Opposition and Local Tax ===
There was significant local opposition in the 1960s and 1970s to expansion of the freeway system. Because of this, by the time public opinion began to favor freeway expansion in the 1980s and 1990s, Phoenix freeways had to be funded primarily by local sales tax dollars rather than diminishing sources of federal money; newer freeways were, and continue to be, given state route designations as opposed to Interstate designations.

Consequently, Phoenix is the largest city in the United States to have at least two Interstate Highways, but no three-digit Interstates. However, the majority of these existing state route and loop freeways still adhere mostly to Interstate Highway standards. Additionally, federal statute 23 USC 129(a)(1)(A) provides that free roads of any funding source (including both local and federal funds) are eligible for Interstate designation; only toll roads built strictly with federal funds are disqualified. All of Phoenix's state route and loop freeways are free roads, making it possible for them to still be assigned potential three-digit Interstate designations in the future, although no such plans are currently in place.

== Interstate Highways and U.S. Routes ==
=== Interstate 10 (Papago and Maricopa Freeways) ===

Interstate 10 enters the metropolitan area from the west in Buckeye and proceeds through the West Valley cities of Goodyear, Avondale, and Tolleson; it interchanges with the Loop 303 in Goodyear and the northbound Loop 101 in Tolleson. Following the Loop 101 interchange, I-10 reaches the western city limits of Phoenix. It meets the Loop 202 South Mountain Freeway between 59th and 51st avenues.

As it approaches downtown Phoenix, I-10 has the first of two interchanges with Interstate 17, a four-level symmetrical stack interchange known locally as The Stack. I-10 and I-17 box in downtown Phoenix. The alignment of the Papago Freeway north of downtown was highly controversial—the first elevated design, ten stories high, triggered a successful freeway revolt. It was the last segment of I-10 to be completed nationwide, opening to traffic in August 1990. It features the Deck Park Tunnel—in actuality, 13 side-by-side bridges supporting Margaret T. Hance Park. I-10 turns south at the Mini Stack, which connects to State Route 51 to the north and Loop 202 to the east. South of the Mini Stack, I-10 provides the western access to Phoenix Sky Harbor International Airport.

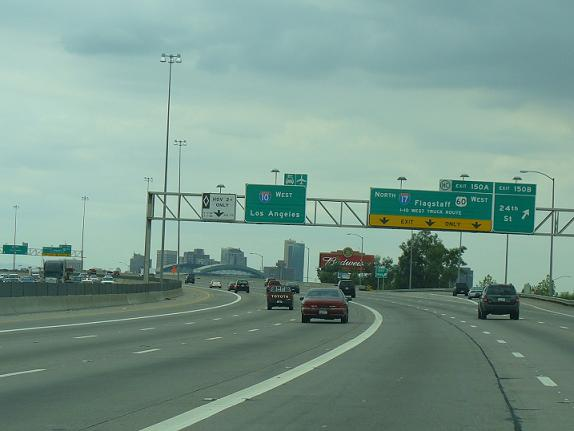
I-10 west at The Split interchange with I-17 north

I-10 merges with I-17 at the Split, the latter interstate's southern terminus, and shifts onto the alignment known as the Maricopa Freeway. It proceeds east and south over the Salt River; interchanges with SR 143, the primary eastern access to the airport, as it enters Tempe; and turns due south at the Broadway Curve. Several miles later, it interchanges with US 60. The highway serves Tempe, Guadalupe, Chandler, and the Ahwatukee neighborhood of Phoenix before meeting the Loop 202 for a third time on the border with the Gila River Indian Community.

=== Interstate 17 (Black Canyon and Maricopa Freeways) ===

Interstate 17 enters the Valley from the north as the Black Canyon Freeway, in the New River and Anthem area. It has a partially completed interchange with Loop 303 and a four-level interchange with Loop 101. It then continues directly southward on the 27th and 25th Avenue alignments in northern Phoenix, passing the former Metrocenter mall site as it heads directly for downtown. This segment is the oldest freeway in the state. Another four-level stack awaits I-17 when it meets Interstate 10 immediately northwest of downtown at The Stack. The highway bends east at the Durango Curve and changes designations from the Black Canyon Freeway to the Maricopa Freeway, bounding downtown Phoenix to the west and south before merging with I-10 at the Split.

=== U.S. Route 60 (Superstition Freeway) ===

While US 60 is co-signed with I-10 and I-17 through central Phoenix, it becomes a separate freeway in its own right on an east-west alignment between Baseline Road and Southern Avenue. Known as the Superstition Freeway, this alignment serves major East Valley cities including Tempe, Mesa, Gilbert, and Apache Junction. There are two interchanges, with the Loop 101 and Loop 202. The latter is known as the SuperRedTan Interchange because it links the Superstition, Red Mountain, and Santan freeways.

== Loops ==
=== Loop 101 (Agua Fria, Pima, and Price Freeways) ===

Loop 101 is the oldest of Phoenix's three beltways, opening in segments between 1988 and 2002. It follows an inverted U shape encircling Phoenix from the north to the southeast, as the Agua Fria Freeway west of I-17; the Pima Freeway from I-17 to the Loop 202 Red Mountain Freeway; and the Price Freeway south to its terminus at the Loop 202 Santan Freeway in Chandler. Along the way, it serves Glendale, Peoria, north Phoenix, Scottsdale, the Salt River Pima-Maricopa Indian Community, and Tempe.

=== Loop 202 (Red Mountain, Santan, and South Mountain Freeways) ===

Loop 202 serves as the outer belt for much of the southeastern and southwestern Valley. The first section of the Red Mountain Freeway, known then as the East Papago Freeway as it continues the east-west alignment of I-10, opened on August 27, 1990; the full planned alignment was not complete until the South Mountain Freeway opened in December 2019. Starting and ending in the city of Phoenix, it serves Mesa, Gilbert, and Chandler along the way.

Construction of the South Mountain Freeway segment, envisioned in the 1980s, was postponed for years by fights over land use with the Gila River Indian Community, which was unwilling to have the freeway built on its land.

=== Loop 303 (Bob Stump Memorial Freeway) ===

The Loop 303 is the second ring road for the Valley's northwest quadrant, extending from just south of I-10 in Goodyear to a temporary interchange with I-17 in far north Phoenix and serving outer Northwest Valley communities including Surprise, Sun City and Sun City West, and northern Peoria. It has become a major corridor for warehouse uses, attracted by the relatively low travel time to the Southern California market.

== Other controlled-access highways ==
=== State Route 24 (Gateway Freeway) ===

The Gateway Freeway serves far southeast Mesa, including its namesake Phoenix-Mesa Gateway Airport, and rapidly growing areas in Queen Creek and San Tan Valley. The first segment, an interchange with Loop 202 and ramps to Ellsworth Road, opened in 2014. To meet growing demand for a regional transportation link, an interim second phase, featuring an overpass over Ellsworth Road and continuing as a divided highway with at-grade intersections out to Ironwood Drive, was completed in 2022. Future plans include converting the Ellsworth Road-Ironwood Drive segment to a full freeway, as well as extending the freeway east to meet with the future Pinal North-South Freeway (Loop 505) near San Tan Valley, as well as US-60 near Gold Canyon.

=== State Route 51 (Piestewa Freeway) ===

The Piestewa Freeway begins at the Mini Stack interchange with I-10 and Loop 202 and proceeds north through the city of Phoenix towards Piestewa Peak, formerly known as Squaw Peak. After passing near Paradise Valley, SR 51 reaches its northern terminus at Loop 101.

This freeway was formerly known as the Squaw Peak Parkway, but since "Squaw" is regarded as a derogatory term for Native American women, the Arizona Board of Geographic and Historic Names rechristened the mountain "Piestewa" Peak after Lori Piestewa, a Native American woman who died in the conflict with Iraq. The name change was controversial, with some residents still referring to both the freeway and the landmark peak as Squaw Peak.

=== State Route 143 (Hohokam Expressway) ===

The Hohokam Expressway, named after the native tribe in the region, acts as a distributor freeway to the Sky Harbor Airport in Downtown Phoenix, running along the east side of the airport. Starting from the Broadway Curve interchange with I-10, the route travels north, intersecting Sky Harbor Boulevard before meeting its northern terminus at Loop 202. Together with the previously mentioned I-10 and Loop 202, the freeways complete a full loop around the airport.

=== Northern Parkway ===
The Northern Parkway is a controlled-access parkway in Glendale, near Luke AFB. Beginning at an interchange with Loop 303, it follows the Butler Drive alignment (half a mile south of Olive Avenue) for about four miles until turning southeast to align with Northern Avenue right before an interchange at Dysart Road. Its eastern terminus is currently at El Mirage Road, with a planned eastern terminus at US-60/Grand Avenue. It is intended to relieve heavy traffic on Northern Avenue, some being contributed by the nearby military base.

Phase III plans for construction of the route between the Agua Fria River and Loop 101, including multiple at-grade intersections, with a diverging-diamond interchange (DDI) where it will meet with Loop 101. Construction is projected to start in late 2025. Phase IV, which will run from Loop 101 to US 60, is currently unfunded with no construction dates set.

== Cancelled and former highways ==
=== State Route 50 ===
State Route 50
- Location: Glendale-Phoenix

SR 50, the Paradise Parkway, was part of Proposition 300 in 1985 as State Route 317. On December 18, 1987, SR 317 was renumbered SR 50. SR 50 was planned to go from the Loop 101 in Glendale to the other side of the loop in Scottsdale, following a path along Camelback Road. SR 50 was removed from the system on December 15, 1994, when then governor Fife Symington made some funding cuts that included removal of the Paradise Parkway, Estrella Freeway, and Grand Avenue Expressway from the system entirely. (The Estrella Freeway was re-added to the system when Proposition 400 was passed ten years later in 2004.) Route 50 will not be re-added to the system, because in February 1996 the ADOT auctioned off all the right-of-way it had purchased for the freeway, which was to be located between Agua Fria Freeway and Route 51 in the Central Valley. A similar, though not identical path with high capacity lanes is being taken by the modern Northern Parkway (Arizona) which is being funded by Maricopa County and the associated cities adjoining the roadway.

Browse numbered routes
← I-40	AZ	→ SR 51

=== ACDC Freeway ===
During the late 1980s and early 90s, the Arizona Canal Diversion Channel (ACDC) Freeway was proposed as an alternative the SR 50. Numerous Phoenix residents were opposed to SR 50's proposed route, and the number of homes that would be destroyed to create its necessary right-of-way. As a result, the ACDC freeway was considered much of its right-of-way was already clear and owned with the freeway being built to hang over the diversion channel. This route would have gone from the Loop 101 in Glendale at about 83rd Avenue and Bell Road to the Loop 101 in Scottsdale at either Camelback Road or Shea Boulevard. The plans also had space for mass transit — either bus lanes or light rail (both at-grade and suspended underneath the freeway were presented as options). Although the path was considered, studied, and put into some county highway plans, it never gained much traction and many transportation officials still believed SR 50 to be a better freeway option and possibility of it being built were removed along with the 50 in 1995.

=== State Route 153 ===

The Sky Harbor Expressway was a small remnant of the old northern alignment of Route 143. Beginning at Washington Street, the former expressway headed south, under the Union Pacific Railroad, to an interchange with the airport entrance, before a bridge over the Salt River parallel to and just a few hundred feet away from the bridge on Route 143. The former expressway then ended at University Avenue with no further planned extension to Interstate 10.

Route 153 was deleted from the Regional Transportation Plan starting in May 2007, and much of the western half of the original alignment was re-used as right-of-way for the Sky Train people mover at Phoenix Sky Harbor International Airport. It is now an extension of 44th Street.

== Other major highways ==
=== U.S. Route 60 (Grand Avenue) ===

US 60 westbound ends its duplex with I-17 at Thomas Road and heads west to the intersection with 27th Avenue, where it turns right before entering Grand Avenue, a diagonal surface street in the northwestern part of the Phoenix metro area. During the 1980s and 90s, plans existed to make Grand an expressway from the Loop 303 to Downtown Phoenix at I-10, I-17, or Van Buren Street, this plan was removed by Fife Symington in 1995. US 60 continues 54 miles northwest to Wickenburg and is the only major surface street to not follow the grid system of Phoenix. This road predates significant city development and remains a primary transportation corridor. The cities of Glendale, Peoria and Surprise were founded with their centers using Grand as their main road. In the early 2000s, several major six-legged intersections were eliminated along Grand Avenue in Phoenix, Glendale, and Peoria to improve traffic flow. Complicating the design of these improvements and compounding the traffic woes they hoped to solve is the presence of the BNSF railroad, which closely parallels Grand to the south in Phoenix and Glendale and to the north between Peoria and Morristown.

=== State Route 74 (Carefree Highway) ===

Arizona State Route 74 is a two-lane highway that connects U.S. Route 60 in Morristown to I-17, passing through the Lake Pleasant Regional Park area.

=== State Route 85 ===

Arizona State Route 85, currently the only non-freeway segment of the route connecting Phoenix with San Diego, is used as route for traffic to bypass the urban core of Phoenix, and has been identified by the state as a potential alignment of the CANAMEX Corridor through Arizona. As such, future plans include fully upgrading the roadway to freeway status by converting existing at-grade intersections to controlled-access intersections, and preliminary study and engineering to create a full freeway-to-freeway interchange with Interstate 8 near Gila Bend is under way. However, the current Regional Transportation Plan does not include funding for these improvements.

Beginning in 2002, work began on a phased implementation plan to upgrade Route 85 from a two-lane rural highway to a four-lane divided highway from its junction with Interstate 10 to just north of the town of Gila Bend. The construction plan, which included a controlled-access intersection with Patterson Road and improvements to the junction with Route 238 in Gila Bend, was completed in 2010.

=== State Route 87 ===

Arizona State Route 87, is currently the highway running from I-10 in Picacho, to SR-84 in Picacho, to SR-287 in Coolidge, to SR-387 near Coolidge, to SR-187 near Sacaton, to SR-587 in Chandler, to Loop 202 in Chandler, to US-60 in Mesa, to Loop 202 in Mesa, to SR-188 near Rye, to SR-260 in Payson, to SR-99 in Winslow, to I-40 in Winslow, to finally SR-264 in Second Mesa. As SR-87 travels through Chandler, it is designated as Arizona Avenue, while in Mesa, it's designated as Country Club Drive. Arizona State Route 87 is similar to SR-85 & SR-74, and it's also in Maricopa County.

== Proposed and future freeways ==
=== Interstate 11 ===

Interstate 11, the Hassayampa Freeway, is a proposed Interstate Highway in the United States to run from Casa Grande, Arizona, northwest to Las Vegas, Nevada, by way of Kingman, Arizona. The highway will parallel and/or upgrade existing U.S. 93 north of Wickenburg; south of Wickenburg, it will follow a new freeway near the Hassayampa River, in Tonopah, the Interstate will then turn east, and run concurrently with I-10 before splitting south in Buckeye, to run concurrently with SR-85. South of Buckeye, I-11 will branch off and run southeast, serving the communities of Maricopa and Stanfield, before ending at an interchange with I-8 west of Casa Grande. Future extension plans would see the freeway run southeast, joining I-10, before branching off at Saguaro National Park, bypassing Tucson. The freeway would then join (or possibly replace) I-19, running south to Nogales and the Mexican border. Interstate 11 is part of a long-range vision for the Valley's future transportation needs, as defined by the Maricopa Association of Governments and ADOT. Interstate 11 was approved June 30, 2012 as part of the Moving Ahead for Progress in the 21st Century Act. In June 2013, a joint draft study commissioned by the respective DOTs of Arizona and Nevada concluded that the freeway was justified, citing benefits in travel, tourism, trade, and economic growth. The conclusion of the study further clears the way for Interstate 11's funding and implementation.

=== State Route 30 (Tres Rios Freeway) ===

The Tres Rios Freeway, has been proposed as an east–west freeway in an effort to move some West Valley motorists off of I-10 in an attempt to decrease traffic along that frequently congested Interstate. Its western beginning would be at Route 85, and it would run east to encounter proposed Loop 303, and continue through to Loop 202's South Mountain Freeway. From there it would continue east to a terminatus at Interstate 17 near downtown Phoenix at the Durango Curve. Construction of the proposed Route 30 (former SR 801) has been approved, and will begin in the early 2027. Following the approval of Interstate 11 in the 2012 Surface Transportation Act, a study for a Westward extension of SR 30 to I-11 (currently SR-85) will be conducted by MAG.

=== State Route 74 (Lake Pleasant Freeway) ===

Due to expected rapid growth in the northwestern reaches of the metropolitan area, long-term regional highway plans include acquisition of right-of-way for eventual future expansion of SR 74 to a freeway.

=== State Route 85 (future I-11 from the Gila River to I-10) ===

The segment of SR-85 between Gila Bend to Buckeye is a connector between I-8 and I-10, and serves both as a connector from I-8 from San Diego to Phoenix. All of the four-lane divided road upgrades from Gila Bend to Buckeye have already been completed, aside from a 5 mile section through the town of Gila Bend. The section from SR-30 to I-10, has been identified as the most important section to upgrade to freeway status. The section from SR-30 to the Gila River could also be upgraded to freeway status as a part of the Interstate 11 Corridor.

=== Loop 404 (White Tank Freeway) ===

The White Tank Freeway is a new long-term freeway alignment designed to address expected rapid growth in the far northwest valley around Surprise and northern Buckeye. The freeway will begin at the US 60 interchange with Loop 303 in Surprise, run concurrent with US 60 for several miles, then split off westward at Jomax Road to connect with the planned future alignment of the Hassayampa Freeway (Interstate 11) west of Buckeye. Construction of this freeway is expected to take place around the same time as construction of I-11. "404" has been proposed as the numbering for this project.

Browse numbered routes
← SR 389	Loop 404	→ SR 410

=== Loop 505 (Pinal North–South Freeway) ===

ADOT is currently in the Tier 2 environmental study phase of the planned Pinal North–South Freeway to serve expected growth in the Pinal County region of the Phoenix Metro area. This future freeway would connect I-10 around Eloy with the Superstition Freeway (US 60) in Gold Canyon, passing through Coolidge and Florence and intersecting with the planned future alignment of the Williams Gateway Freeway (SR 24).

== Named interchanges and features ==
The table below lists commonly used colloquialisms and nicknames for several interchanges and portions within the freeway system.

Name	Feature Type	Freeway(s) Involved	Location	AADT	Year	Aerial
Broadway Curve	Direction change	I-10 / US 60 (Maricopa Freeway)	Tempe	228,000	1968	
Deck Park Tunnel (Dean Lindsey Memorial Tunnel)	Vehicular tunnel	I-10 (Inner Loop)	Phoenix	260,000	1990	
Dreamy Draw	Mountain pass	SR 51	Phoenix	129,000	1995	
Durango Curve	Direction change, transition between Maricopa and Black Canyon Freeways	I-17 / US 60	Phoenix	110,000	1963	
Mini Stack	4-level Interchange	I-10 (Inner Loop) / Loop 202 (Red Mountain Freeway) / SR 51	Phoenix	387,000	1990	
North Stack	4-level Interchange	I-17 (Black Canyon Freeway) / Loop 101	Phoenix	227,000	2001	
The Split	3-level Interchange	US 60 (Maricopa Freeway) / I-10 / I-17	Phoenix	244,000	1988	
The Stack	4-level Interchange	I-17 / US 60 (Black Canyon Freeway) / I-10	Phoenix	407,000	1990	
SuperRedTan	4-level Interchange	US 60 (Superstition Freeway) / Loop 202	Mesa	137,500	2007	
Superstition Transition	3-level Interchange	I-10 (Maricopa Freeway) / US 60	Tempe	228,000	1970	

== Funding ==
Phoenix has been expanding its highway system since 1985, when voters passed Proposition 300, which established a half-cent general sales tax to fund new urban freeways that were currently in the Regional Transportation Plan. At the time, this included the unbuilt or partially unbuilt: Sky Harbor Expressway, I-10, Route 51, Route 143, Loop 101, and Loop 202. Most of these were completed by 2005, with Loop 202 being in the final stage of construction.

In 1994, voters in Maricopa County voted against Proposition 400, which would have extended the half-cent sales tax extension from 2006 through 2016 had it been passed. Half of this additional funding would have been used for improvements in mass transit as well as new freeways. But because of the defeat, there was no funding beyond fiscal year 2006, regardless of if the Regional Transportation Plan was completed or not.

In 1996, the Maricopa Association of Governments Regional Council passed a series of bills provided funding for a Long Range Plan between fiscal years 2007 and 2015. The Red Mountain Freeway, Santan Freeway, and Sky Harbor Expressway segments, all of which were previously unfunded, became prioritized with construction commencing almost immediately.

In 1999, even more funding was given to accelerate construction of the Regional Transportation Plan by the State Legislature, which passed a bill called the "2007 Acceleration Plan". This bill forced the State Infrastructure Bank to assist in funds, which assisted in pushing the completion of Regional Transportation Plan forward to the end of 2007.

With the transportation tax set to expire in 2006, a revived Proposition 400 was put before the voters of Maricopa County in 2004, ten years after the original vote ended in failure. Proposing an identical half-cent extension of the sales tax, the new proposition would extend the tax a full 20 years as opposed to the original 10. Unlike its predecessor, the proposition passed by a wide 58-42% margin and established funding for several future projects including highways and mass transit. A similar but much more wide-reaching proposal to enact a full one-cent sales tax increase over a 30-year period on a statewide level, much of which would have gone to funding Phoenix area projects, failed to qualify for the 2008 general election ballot due to issues with the petition.

However, the 1985 plan was not fully completed by 2007 due to the lingering unfinished segment of Loop 202 between University Drive and Power Road in Mesa, where work wrapped up on July 21, 2008.

== Ramp metering ==
The Phoenix freeway system heavily utilizes ramp meters, with several currently installed in the metropolitan area located on I-10, I-17, Loop 101, Loop 202 (on the Red Mountain Freeway from I-10 to Gilbert Road, as well as at select interchanges on the SanTan Freeway from Dobson to Gilbert Road), SR 51, and US 60. Since their implementation in the 1980s, the goal of these has remained to "break up platoons" of cars by limiting the number that can enter a freeway at a time. The Arizona Department of Transportation (ADOT) states that this has been "tremendously successful".

== Travel times program ==
On January 22, 2008, a test program was begun by ADOT which involved the placement of travel times to popular commuter destinations on variable message signs along inbound freeway routes during the morning peak hours and outbound routes in the evening. Initially, these signs were only activated on weekdays during peak travel hours (6am to 9am and 3pm to 7pm) and did not appear if there is a more urgent message to display; such as an Amber alert or other emergency. In late July 2015, the hours when travel times were displayed were extended. Travel times are now displayed from 5am to 11pm on weekdays, and 7am to 9pm on weekends. During overnight hours, the signs instead display warnings to watch for street sweepers.

== Logo signing program ==
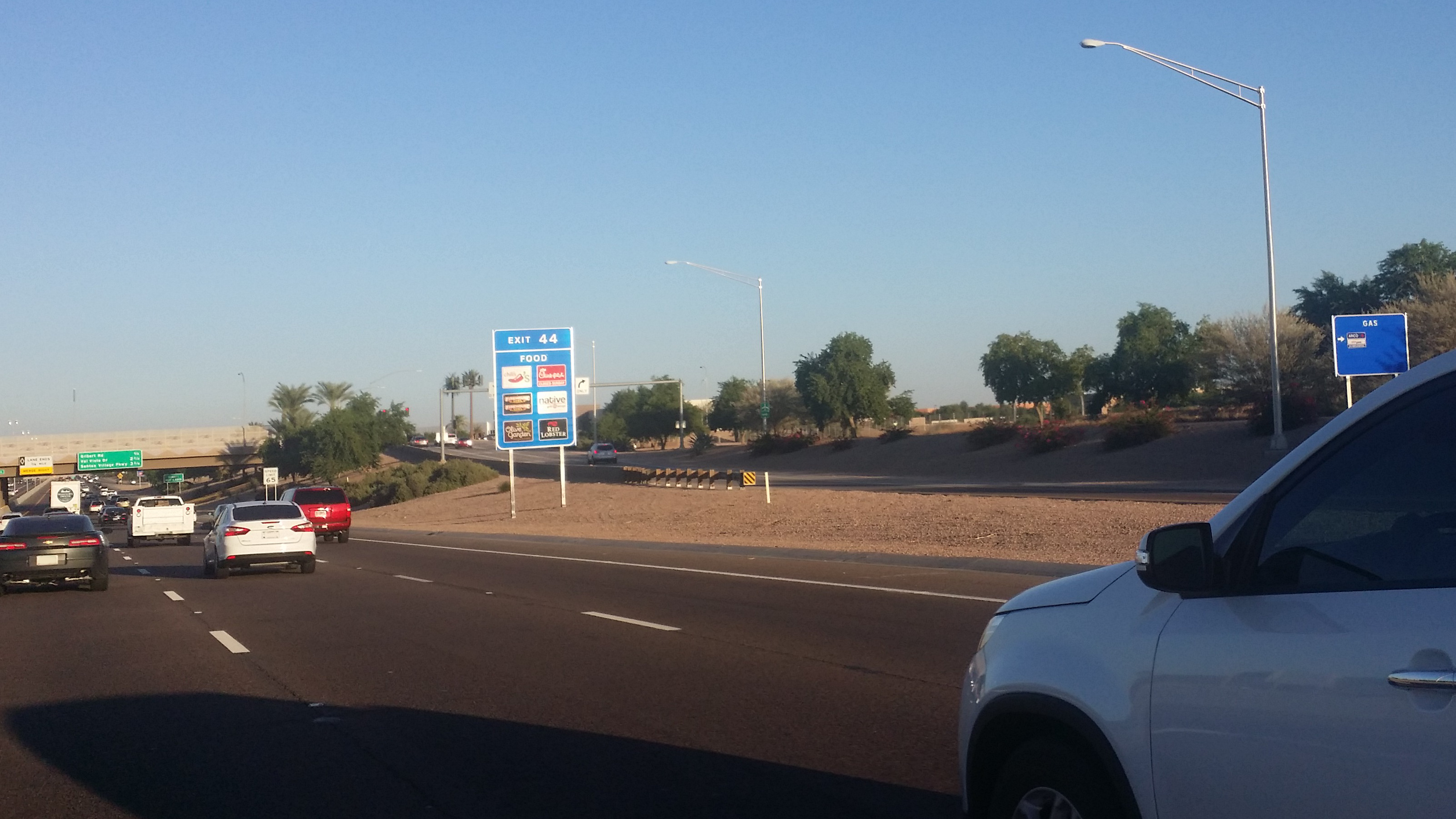
Logo signs on the Loop 202 SanTan Freeway in Chandler

Beginning in late 2013, several Phoenix area freeways began to receive logo signs at select exits, advertising food, lodging, gas, and attractions businesses. This program was previously restricted only to rural highways within the state until the restriction was lifted in 2013, allowing the installation of these signs on most Phoenix area freeways and allowing increased revenue to the state. As of December 2019, installation of logo signs on Phoenix area freeways is mostly complete, except for some non-freeway portions of Loop 303 and the Loop 202 Pastor Freeway.

Note that I-10 from Dysart Road westward, I-10 east of the Loop 202 SanTan Freeway interchange, I-17 north of the Loop 303 interchange, and US 60 east of the SuperRedTan interchange has had logo signs installed for many years, but have always been considered part of the state's rural logo sign program. These segments have since been transitioned to the urban logo sign program in terms of pricing.

== See also ==
- Transportation in Arizona
- Arizona Department of Transportation
- Valley Metro
- Maricopa Association of Governments
