= 2015 Phoenix freeway shootings =

Shootings in Arizona, U.S.

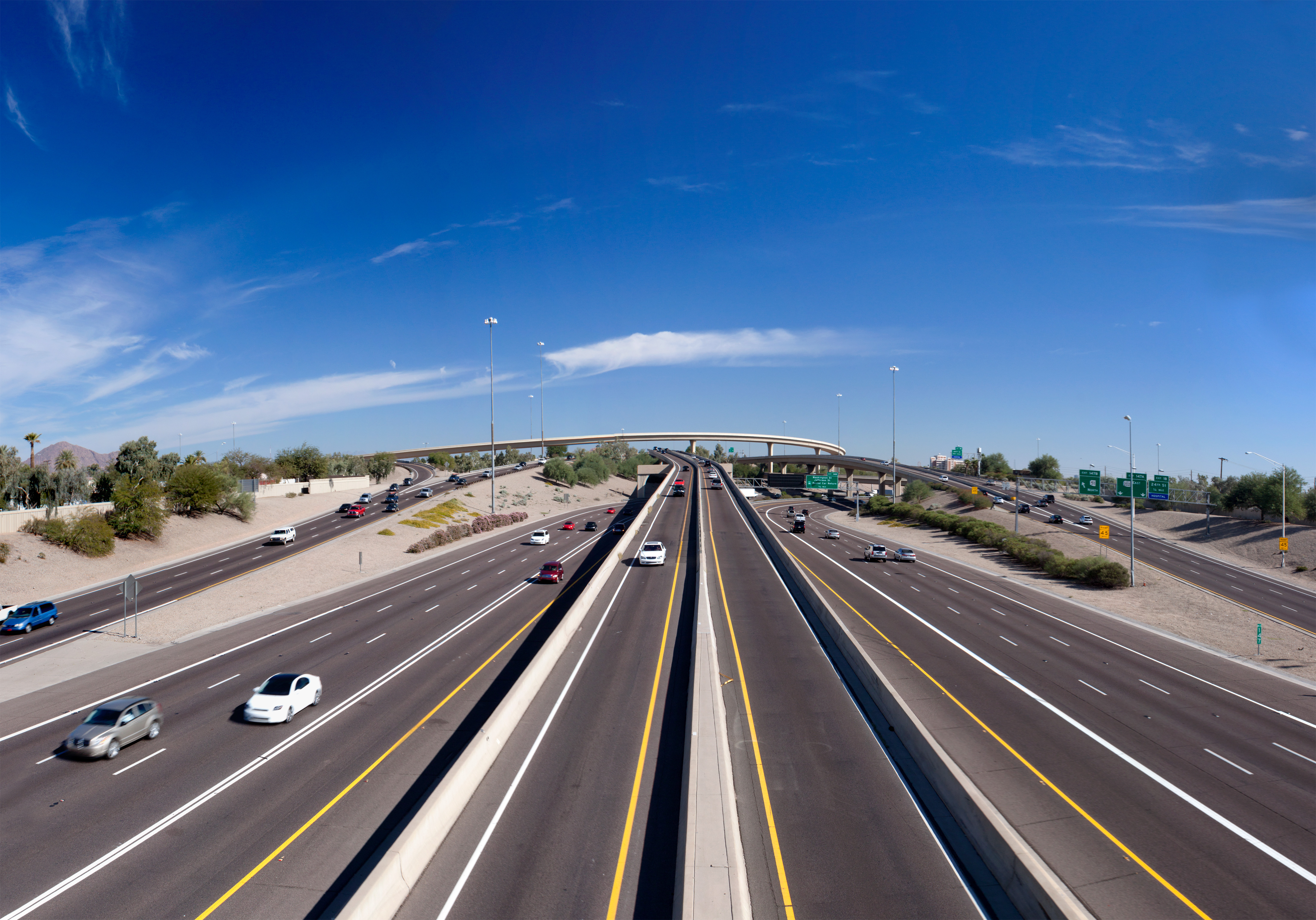
- The Mini Stack, near where numerous shootings occurred

- A map of freeways in Phoenix, including other roads investigated in connection with the shootings
- Location: 33°27′43.41″N 112°2′55.12″W; Interstate 10, State Route 202, Phoenix, Arizona, U.S.
- Date: August 27, 2015 – September 10, 2015
- Target: Vehicles along local freeways
- Attack type: Shooting
- Weapon: Handgun
- Deaths: 0
- Injuries: 1
- Perpetrator: Unknown
- Motive: Unknown

The 2015 Phoenix freeway shootings, also known as the I-10 shootings, were a series of eleven incidents that occurred between August 27 and September 10, 2015, along Interstate 10 and State Route 202 in Phoenix, Arizona. Each incident resulted in projectile damage to cars, and one girl was injured.

A suspect was arrested on September 18, but charges against him were dropped in April 2016. No further arrests have been made since.

== Events ==
Beginning on August 27, eleven shootings occurred: eight by bullets and three by unspecified projectiles. Ten of the incidents occurred on Interstate 10, while the eleventh was on State Route 202. The final shooting occurred on September 10.

== False leads ==
On September 11, a man and woman driving a car were taken into custody in relation to the shootings. The woman was later released, but the 19-year-old male suspect was kept in police custody, as sources stated that he boasted about the shootings to friends. He was later arrested on an unrelated marijuana charge.

Road debris shattering windows also played a role in the investigation, as shattered windows were often investigated as being part of the spree. For example, on September 16 a driver reported his windows being shot by a car that he was seeking to pass, but police later stated that road debris caused the window damage.

Three 18-year-olds with a slingshot were arrested on September 13 on claims that they had been making copycat attacks, and the three admitted to targeting cars and pedestrians. They were later released.

== Mistaken suspect ==
Leslie Allen Merritt, Jr., then aged 21, was arrested in Glendale on September 18, 2015. Police initially claimed that Merritt held anti-government and anti-police views. One day after his arrest, police claimed that they had linked the first four shootings to a pistol owned by Merritt. The weapon in question was later shown to have been in a pawn shop at the time of the fourth shooting. He was charged with fifteen felony counts, including carrying out a drive-by shooting, aggravated assault, unlawfully discharging a firearm, disorderly conduct, and endangerment; prosecutors also considered filing terrorism charges, but ultimately did not, as terrorism-related laws focused primarily on protecting public utilities and did not encompass freeway shootings.

All charges were dropped in April 2016. Merritt was formally cleared of all charges and records were sealed in an August 2020 proceeding with Maricopa County Superior Court Judge William Wingard presiding, who stated, "Leslie Allen Merritt Jr. has been cleared of any allegation or charge, and such a finding is in the interest of justice."

Merritt filed a lawsuit against state officials, which went to jury trial in the fall of 2020. The jury returned a finding for the defense, which Merritt appealed in April 2021. The appeal was denied by the Arizona District Court. Merritt again appealed and won a judgment of $1 million.

In July 2024, Merritt filed a defamation lawsuit against former Department of Public Safety Director and Maricopa County sheriff candidate Frank Milstead after Milstead stated, "Leslie Merritt, in my opinion, is still the freeway shooter, and we had the right guy in custody" while discussing his run to secure to the Republican nomination for Maricopa County sheriff on KPNX. Merritt's attorneys claim Milstead made the comments about Merritt while knowing they were false and that they amounted to defamation. Milstead placed second in the Republican primary behind Jerry Sheridan.

== See also ==
- Dale Hausner and Samuel Dieteman, two gunmen who carried out serial shootings in Arizona
- 2003 Ohio highway sniper attacks, a similar crime spree that occurred Interstate 270 in Ohio
