= Piestewa =

Piestewa can refer to:

- Lori Piestewa, a Native American woman killed in the 2003 invasion of Iraq
- Piestewa Peak, the second highest point in the Phoenix Mountains
- Piestewa Freeway, a nickname for Arizona Route 51 in Metropolitan Phoenix
