= Arizona State Route 153 =

Former state highway in Arizona

State Route 153
- Sky Harbor Expressway
- SR 153 highlighted in red

Route information
- Maintained by City of Phoenix (since 2007)
- Length: 2.12 mi (3.41 km)
- Existed: 1985–2007

Major junctions
- South end: University Drive
- North end: Washington Street

Location
- Country: United States
- State: Arizona
- Counties: Maricopa

Highway system
- Arizona State Highway System; Interstate; US; State; Scenic Proposed; Former
← SR 143	→ SR 160

State Route 153, also known as SR 153 and the Sky Harbor Expressway, is a former state highway in Maricopa County, in the U.S. state of Arizona, that ran from the intersection of 44th Street and Washington Street in Phoenix south to University Drive. It was a controlled access arterial expressway, with a speed limit of 45 mph (72 km/h), lower than the standard freeway speed of 65 mph (105 km/h). Route 153 was a north–south route that skirted the eastern edge of Sky Harbor International Airport, and along with SR 143, SR 153 served a portion of East Valley residents with access to the airport. Many motorists used SR 143 (the Hohokam Expressway) instead, because of its quick access to and from Interstate 10 and Loop 202. The freeway did, however, provide a direct link to office developments in the Southbank commercial project in east Phoenix with the city of Tempe.

This freeway is currently decommissioned. Now an extension of 44th Street, updated signage has been installed. Portions of this right-of-way now accommodate the PHX Sky Train.

== Route description ==
State Route 153's entire length was within Phoenix. It began at University Drive, just west of Route 143. It headed northward as an expressway, passing alongside the Phoenix Sky Harbor International Airport. Just a little north of the eastern edge of the airport, Route 153 met its northern terminus Washington Street.

== History ==
The Sky Harbor Expressway was a part of the 1985 Phoenix Regional Freeway System to add freeways in and around the Phoenix Metropolitan Area and a part of the 2005 Maricopa County Regional Transportation Plan to add new freeways and expand existing ones that were built from the original plan.

The expressway originally was supposed to connect to Loop 202 east of SR 143. But in 1989, Route 143 north of University Drive was realigned 1/4 mile (400 m) to the east, and SR 153 was realigned onto the old section of Route 143 between Sky Harbor International Airport and Washington Street. The unbuilt eastbound leg of SR 153 to Loop 202 was later constructed as SR 202 Spur.

The old section of Route 143 originally had an un-bridged crossing of the Salt River. Reconstruction of this section begin in the early 1990s, and the expanded freeway reopened to traffic as SR 153 in 1992, almost touching the new Route 143 at the halfway point before ending at University Drive, which provided direct access to Route 143, which in turn connected to I-10 and US 60 to the south.

The expressway was planned to be extended further south and west to 40th Street in order to connect to I-10 by the end of 2007, with plans to convert a section of 40th Street to a limited access corridor. An at-grade intersection with Superior Avenue was planned, as well as an overpass of University Drive. However, those plans were on hold for quite some time and were eventually scrapped, as it was determined that the road was no longer needed.

=== Transfer to Phoenix ===
Because the road was an ADOT highway, the road had to be deleted off the Maricopa Association of Governments' Regional Transportation Plan and ADOT's maintenance log. It was transferred to the city of Phoenix by the MAG in August 2007 and the Arizona Department of Transportation in October 2007. Route 153 was deleted from the regional transportation plan in August 2007.

Extremely low traffic volumes, especially in comparison to the nearby Route 143, enhanced the MAG's decision. The MAG concluded that Route 153 was considered redundant from the start, as Route 143 runs completely parallel and provides access to all major freeways in the vicinity.

The city of Phoenix has now taken over maintenance and right of way of the Sky Harbor Expressway for the first segment (construction complete in 2013) of the PHX Sky Train.

In April 2008 any reference to Route 153 (reassurance and junction signs) on the Sky Harbor Expressway, University Drive, and Washington Street have all been removed. In late June 2008, the Sky Harbor Expressway name was dropped, and all signs and references to the former state route were changed to "To 44th St." ADOT signage still exists along the entire stretch, except for exit numbers, mileposts, and reassurance signs.

== Traffic ==
While SR 143 has peak hour traffic issues, it is still adequately handling most of the Sky Harbor Airport traffic that comes from the East Valley off Interstate 10 and US 60, thus proving that Route 153 had always been consistently under-utilized.

Beginning in the Summer of 2021, work began on the $800 million I-10 Broadway Curve project, which included reconstructing SR 143 between the junction of I-10 and Sky Harbor Airport with new and expanded flyover ramps at the junction with I-10 including direct HOV access to SR 143. Construction of the project was completed in June 2025.

== Exit list ==
The entire route was in Phoenix, Maricopa County.

mi	km	Exit	Destinations	Notes
			I-10 / US 60 (Maricopa Freeway)	Was to have been southern terminus; would have continued south as 40th Street
			Superior Avenue	At-grade intersection; was to have been south end of freeway section
0.00	0.00	1	University Drive to I-10 (US 60) / SR 143	At-grade intersection; was to have become an interchange
1.17	1.88	Bridge over the Salt River		
2.50	4.02	2A	Sky Harbor International Airport	Was signed as exit 2 southbound
2.93	4.72	2B	Air Lane	Was northbound exit and southbound entrance
3.50	5.63		Washington Street	At-grade intersection; northern terminus; continued north as 44th Street
1.000 mi = 1.609 km; 1.000 km = 0.621 mi: Incomplete access; Unopened

== See also ==
- List of Arizona State Routes
- Metropolitan Phoenix Freeways
- Phoenix Sky Harbor International Airport
