= Arizona State Route 101 =

Freeway in the Phoenix metropolitan area, Arizona, United States

State Route 101
- Loop 101 highlighted in red

Route information
- Maintained by ADOT
- Length: 60.99 mi (98.15 km)
- Existed: 1988–present
- History: Fully completed in 2002

Major junctions
- Counterclockwise end: I-10 in Tolleson
- US 60 in Peoria; I-17 in Phoenix; SR 51 in Phoenix; Loop 202 in Mesa; US 60 in Tempe
- Clockwise end: Loop 202 in Chandler

Location
- Country: United States
- State: Arizona
- Counties: Maricopa

Highway system
- Arizona State Highway System; Interstate; US; State; Scenic Proposed; Former
← SR 99	→ SR 143

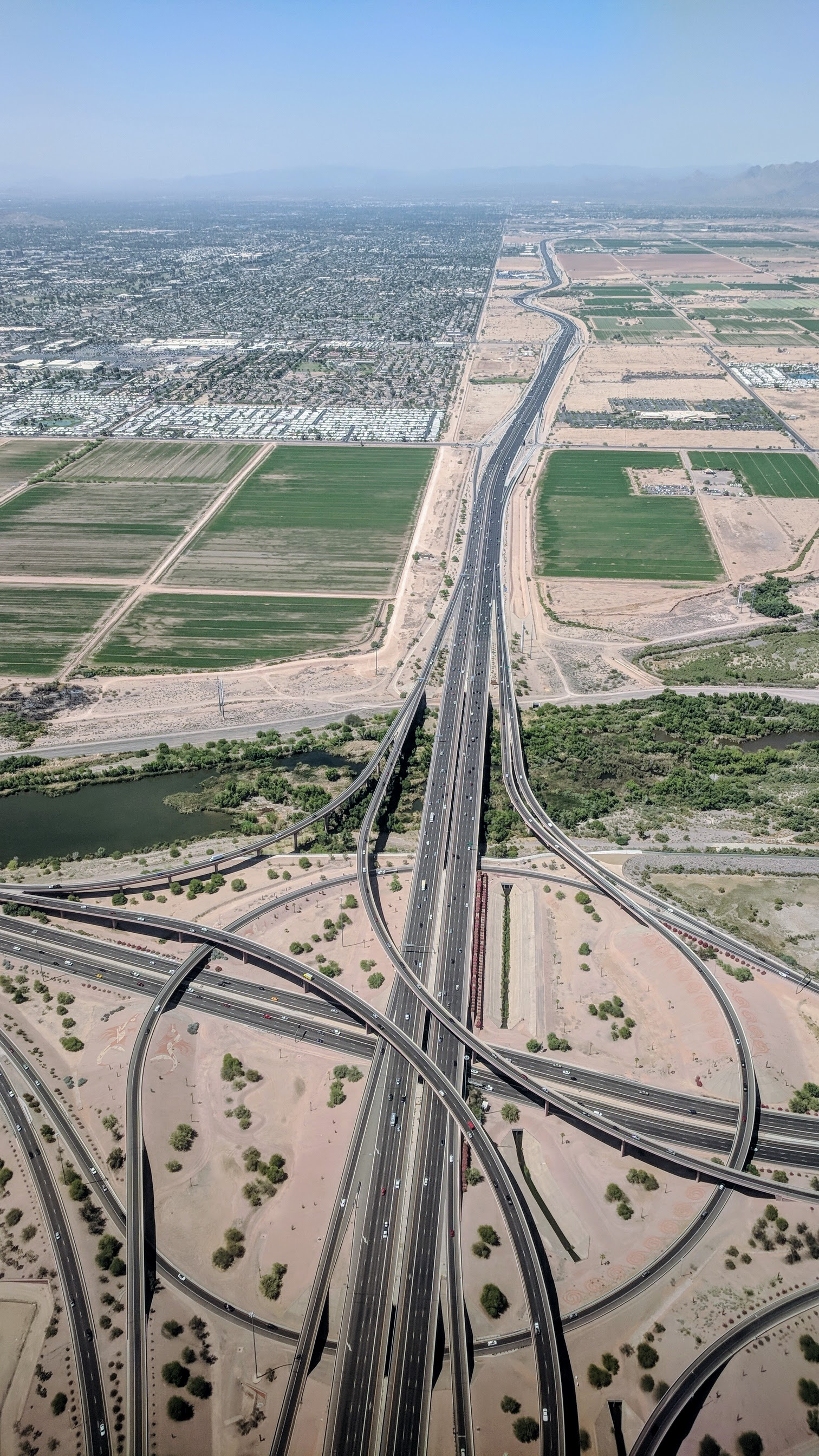
Interchange of 101 (Pima Freeway) with Loop 202 (Red Mountain Freeway) in Mesa, with 101 through Scottsdale in the distance

State Route 101 (SR 101) or Loop 101 is a semi-beltway looping around the Phoenix Metropolitan Area in central Arizona, United States. It connects several suburbs of Phoenix, including Tolleson, Glendale, Peoria, Scottsdale, Mesa, Tempe, and Chandler. Construction began in 1986 and was completed in 2002.

Loop 101 has three officially designated sections along its route:

- Agua Fria Freeway in the west valley from Interstate 10 (I-10) to I-17
- Pima Freeway in the east valley from I-17 to Loop 202 (Red Mountain Freeway)
- Price Freeway in the east valley from Loop 202 (Red Mountain Freeway) to Loop 202 (Santan Freeway)

== Route description ==
=== Agua Fria Freeway ===
Loop 101 begins as the Agua Fria Freeway at a three-level interchange with I-10 in Tolleson west of Phoenix. From that point, the route heads north entering Phoenix then Glendale, passing State Farm Stadium and Desert Diamond Arena. Continuing northward through Peoria, it encounters the Grand Avenue portion of US 60 and passes the Peoria Sports Complex before entering northwestern Glendale and curving east just past the Arrowhead Towne Center mall. The route then heads east along the Beardsley Road alignment, traveling through the community of Arrowhead Ranch. The freeway enters northern Phoenix, and at milepost 23, Loop 101 intersects I-17 15 miles (24 km) north of Downtown Phoenix.

=== Pima Freeway ===
Continuing east as the Pima Freeway, Loop 101 travels just south of Deer Valley Airport before intersecting the northern terminus of SR 51 at milepost 29. East of this junction, Loop 101 travels through Northern Phoenix, passing through Desert Ridge and passing by Desert Ridge Marketplace to its north, and Mayo Clinic to its south. The freeway then curves south through Scottsdale on the Pima Road alignment. The freeway then curves east and passes through the Salt River Pima-Maricopa Indian Community, just south of Via Linda providing access to Downtown Scottsdale, Scottsdale Pavilions, Scottsdale Community College, two casinos, and Scottsdale Fashion Square. Continuing south, Loop 101 encounters an interchange with the Red Mountain Freeway portion of Loop 202 in Tempe at milepost 51. This interchange is partially built over the Salt River.

=== Price Freeway ===
Loop 101 then becomes the Price Freeway and continues south. Just south of the interchange, the freeway passes Tempe Marketplace to the east, and Sloan Park to the west. The freeway then passes Arizona State University to the east. At milepost 53, the freeway provides access to Apache Boulevard, and the Price–101 Freeway/Apache Boulevard park and ride light rail station, on Valley Metro's A Line. The route then intersects the Superstition Freeway portion of US 60 at milepost 55 before entering Chandler.

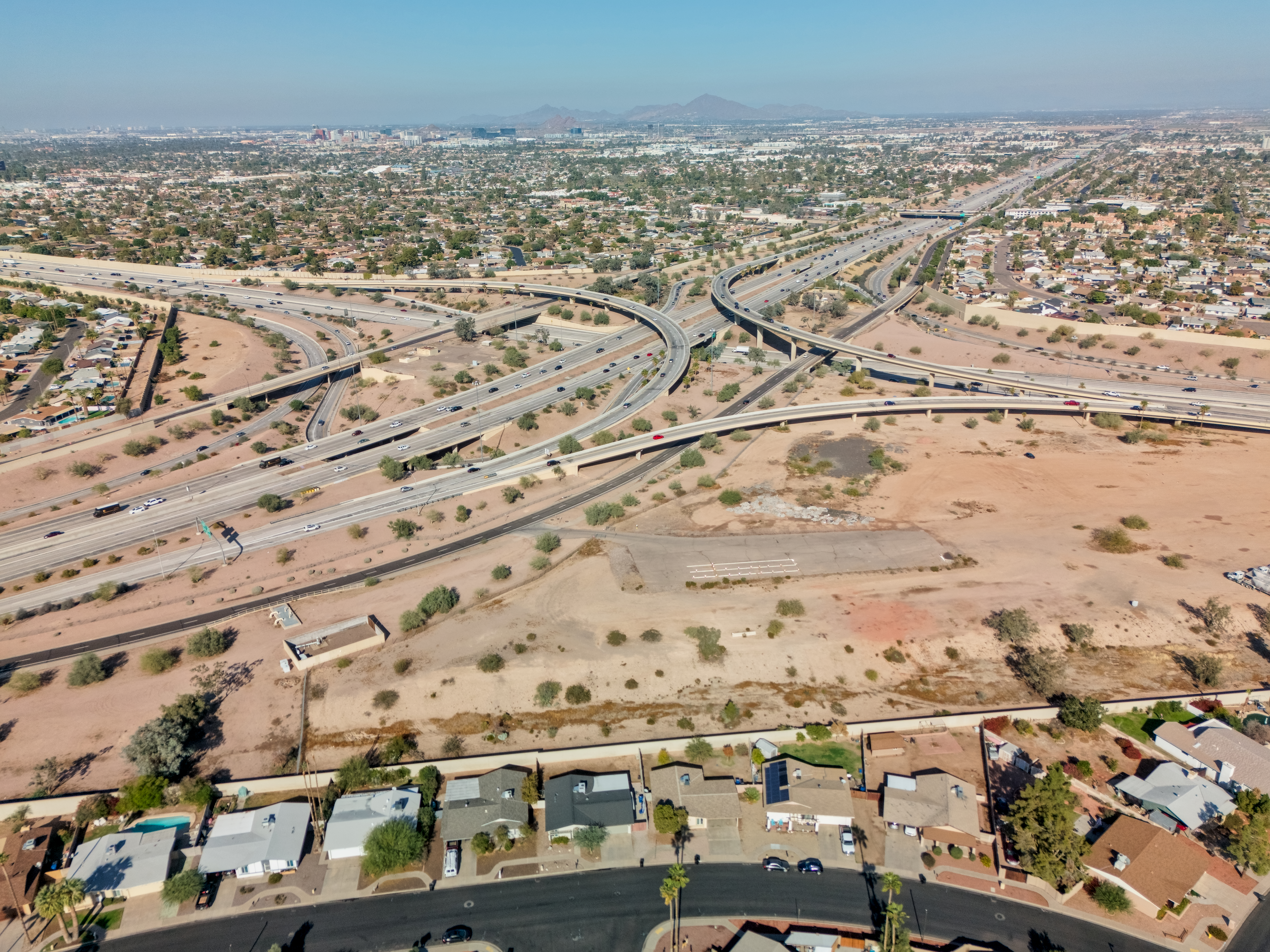
Loop 101 and US 60 interchange in Tempe

Loop 101 provides access to Chandler Fashion Center just prior to concluding at milepost 61 at an interchange with the Santan Freeway portion of Loop 202.

== History ==
=== Original construction ===
Old colored Arizona Loop 101 shield that has been phased out.

Loop 101 was a part of the 1985 Maricopa County Regional Transportation Plan that was funded by a sales tax approved by Maricopa County voters that year. The freeway was originally assigned two different route numbers along its path: The Agua Fria Freeway portion was initially designated as SR 417, and the Pima/Price Freeway portion was initially designated as SR 117. The Loop 101 designation was first assigned on December 18, 1987, at which time the South Mountain Freeway and the portion of the San Tan Freeway between I-10 and Price Road were also designated to be part of Loop 101. On July 19, 1991, the proposed South Mountain Freeway was renumbered as part of Loop 202. The San Tan Freeway portion of Loop 101 was only officially renumbered when its opening took place.

In 1990, after several years of negotiation with the Salt River Pima–Maricopa Indian Community, the state of Arizona paid the tribe $247 million for right of way for the nine-mile eastern leg of Loop 101 from Via Linda to the north bank of the Salt River. The resulting alignment kept all four corners of each interchange on tribal land, allowing the community to control and benefit from development. The tribe formed a development arm, Salt River DevCo, to manage these and other community developable properties.

Loop 101 was built in stages from 1986 to 2002. The first segment of Loop 101 opened in November 1988, consisting of the two-mile stretch from Peoria Avenue to Northern Avenue in Peoria. Throughout the next 14 years, the other 59 miles of the route would be built including the interchanges with I-10, I-17, both Loop 202 Freeways, and the US 60. The final segment that was built was the two-mile stretch from Scottsdale Road to Pima Road in Scottsdale that opened in April 2002, marking the full completion of the entire 61-mile route. Loop 101 was built with three general-purpose lanes in each direction along with one auxiliary lane with the exception of the three-mile stretch from Loop 202 (Red Mountain Freeway) to US 60 where there were four general-purpose lanes in each direction.

In January 2006, Scottsdale installed speed enforcement cameras along its 7.8 mile stretch of Loop 101 to lower speeds and reduce collisions. There were six cameras placed in total, three in each direction. The system was calibrated to ticket anyone traveling 76 mph (122 km/h) or greater, as 65 mph (105 km/h) was the predetermined speed limit. The trial phase lasted from January to October 2006 before resuming full time in February 2007. There had been much criticism of the program since its inception, and it ended in 2010.

=== Recent improvements ===
Due to booming population growth in Phoenix's suburbs along the route of the freeway, the initial build-out of three general purpose lanes and one auxiliary lane proved to be inefficient, and therefore, the route has undergone many widening projects to accommodate the growth in the region.

First, between 2007 and 2011, HOV lanes were constructed along the entire route in different phases. It included construction of direct HOV ramps between Loop 101 east and SR 51 south in Northern Phoenix and Loop 101 north and Loop 202 east (Santan Freeway) in Chandler. The final phase, the Maryland Avenue HOV interchange in Glendale began construction in October 2013 and was completed in March 2014. Due to the nature of the project, the HOV lanes near the exit had to widened for extra lane width.

Following the completion of the phased HOV-lane project, a phased project was launched to add a fourth-general purpose lane in both directions. As of 2025, the section of the freeway from Indian School Road to 75th Avenue, is the only section remaining to not yet at least release final design plans on its fourth lane.

=== Phased fourth-lane construction ===
In August 2014, construction began for the 11-mile segment from Shea Boulevard to Loop 202 in Scottsdale. Construction was completed in October of 2016. In February of 2019, construction began for the 13-mile segment from I-17 to Pima Road in Scottsdale and northeast Phoenix. Construction was completed in January of 2022. In May of 2019, construction began for the 6.4-mile segment from Baseline Road to Loop 202 (Santan Freeway) in the East Valley. Construction was completed in August of 2020.

Construction began in January 2024 for the 4.5-mile segment from Shea Boulevard to Princess Drive/Pima Road. Construction was completed in January 2026. Construction began in September of 2024 for the six-mile segment from 75th Avenue to I-17 in the northwest valley. Construction is expected to be completed in early 2027.

As a part of improvements made to the I-10 / Loop 101 interchange, the design report for the project shows the segment from I-10 to Indian School Road being widened. Construction is planned to begin in 2025 and be completed in 2027.

=== New exit ===
The 64th Street interchange in northeast Phoenix opened in May 2015 after being built in 2008 during the initial build-out of the freeway.

== Future ==
ADOT, in partnership with MAG and the cities of Goodyear and Tolleson, plan to construct direct HOV lane connections at the I-10 interchange between Loop 101 and I-10 east. Construction is planned to begin in 2025 and be completed in 2027.

The Northern Avenue interchange in Peoria is planned to be upgraded to a diverging diamond interchange (DDI). It will be the first DDI on Loop 101, and construction is expected to begin in 2025 and be completed in 2027.

== Exit list ==
The entire route is in Maricopa County.

Location	mi	km	Exit	Destinations	Notes
Tolleson	0.00	0.00	1A-B	I-10 (Papago Freeway) – Phoenix, Los Angeles	Counterclockwise terminus; signed as exits 1A (west) and 1B (east); exit 133B on I-10
Tolleson	0.00	0.00	1C	I-10 east	Planned HOV interchange with construction set to begin in 2025
Phoenix	0.72	1.16	2	McDowell Road	Southbound exit and northbound entrance
Phoenix	1.74	2.80	3	Thomas Road	
Phoenix	2.75	4.43	4	Indian School Road	
Phoenix	3.79	6.10	5	Camelback Road	
Glendale	4.78	7.69	6	Cardinals Way	Formerly Bethany Home Road
Glendale	5.29	8.51	7A	Maryland Avenue	HOV interchange
Glendale	5.78	9.30	7B	Glendale Avenue	
Glendale–Peoria line	6.88	11.07	8	Northern Avenue	Planned diverging diamond interchange (DDI) with construction to begin in 2026; future Northern Parkway
Peoria	8.09	13.02	9	Olive Avenue	
Peoria	9.10	14.65	10	Peoria Avenue	
Peoria	10.01	16.11	11	US 60 (Grand Avenue)	Northbound exit and southbound entrance; former US 89 / SR 93
Peoria	10.54	16.96	11	91st Avenue to US 60 (Grand Avenue)	Southbound exit and northbound entrance; referred to internally as exit 11A
Peoria	11.47	18.46	12	Thunderbird Road	
Peoria	12.30	19.79	Bridge over Skunk Creek		
Peoria	13.53	21.77	14	Bell Road	
Glendale	14.59	23.48	15	Union Hills Drive	No southbound exit; southbound access is via exit 16
Glendale			Cardinal direction change: Western leg (north–south) / Northern leg (west–east) (Note: As indicated by reassurance shields on the mainline, in addition to guide signs on Union Hills Drive and 75th Avenue)		
Glendale	15.49	24.93	16	Beardsley Road west / Union Hills Drive	No eastbound exit
Glendale	16.02	25.78	17	75th Avenue	
Glendale	17.02	27.39	18	67th Avenue	
Glendale	17.96	28.90	19	59th Avenue	
Glendale–Phoenix line	19.86	31.96	20	51st Avenue	
Phoenix	20.97	33.75	22	35th Avenue	Eastbound exit and westbound entrance
Phoenix	22.67– 25.07	36.48– 40.35	23	27th Avenue	Signed as exit 23A westbound
Phoenix	22.67– 25.07	36.48– 40.35	23	I-17 (Black Canyon Freeway) – Flagstaff, Phoenix	Signed as exits 23B (north) and 23C (south) westbound; exit 214C on I-17; westbound exit to NB I-17 includes direct exit ramp onto Deer Valley Road
Phoenix	22.67– 25.07	36.48– 40.35	East end of Agua Fria Freeway; West end of Pima Freeway		
Phoenix	22.98	36.98	24	19th Avenue	Westbound exit and eastbound entrance
Phoenix	23.96	38.56	25	7th Avenue	
Phoenix	24.96	40.17	26	7th Street	
Phoenix	26.99	43.44	28	Cave Creek Road	
Phoenix	28.29– 29.49	45.53– 47.46	29A	SR 51 south	Signed as exit 29 eastbound; northern terminus of SR 51; exit 15A on SR 51
Phoenix	28.29– 29.49	45.53– 47.46	29B	SR 51 south	HOV access only; westbound exit and eastbound entrance
Phoenix	30.09	48.43	31	Tatum Boulevard	
Phoenix	31.18	50.18	32	56th Street	
Phoenix	32.36	52.08	33	64th Street	
Phoenix–Scottsdale line	33.30	53.59	34	Scottsdale Road	
Scottsdale	34.33	55.25	35	Hayden Road	
Scottsdale	35.36	56.91	36	Princess Drive / Pima Road	
Scottsdale			Cardinal direction change: Northern leg (west–east) / Eastern leg (north–south) (Note: As indicated by overhead signs on Princess Drive/Pima Road)		
Scottsdale	36.57	58.85	38	Frank Lloyd Wright Boulevard / Bell Road	No southbound signage for Bell Road
Scottsdale	37.36	60.13	39	Raintree Drive / Thunderbird Road	No northbound signage for Thunderbird Road
Scottsdale	38.86	62.54	40	Cactus Road	
Scottsdale	39.84	64.12	41	Shea Boulevard	
Salt River; Pima–Maricopa; Indian Community	41.13	66.19	42	90th Street / Pima Road	
Salt River; Pima–Maricopa; Indian Community	42.16	67.85	43	Via de Ventura	
Salt River; Pima–Maricopa; Indian Community	43.22	69.56	44	Talking Stick Way / Indian Bend Road	
Salt River; Pima–Maricopa; Indian Community	44.28	71.26	45	McDonald Drive	
Salt River; Pima–Maricopa; Indian Community	45.28	72.87	46	Chaparral Road	Serves Scottsdale Community College
Salt River; Pima–Maricopa; Indian Community	46.28	74.48	47	Indian School Road	
Salt River; Pima–Maricopa; Indian Community	47.30	76.12	48	Thomas Road	
Salt River; Pima–Maricopa; Indian Community	48.31	77.75	49	McDowell Road	
Salt River; Pima–Maricopa; Indian Community	49.32	79.37	50	McKellips Road	
Mesa	50.03– 50.64	80.52– 81.50	Bridge over the Salt River		
Mesa	50.03– 50.64	80.52– 81.50	51	Loop 202 (Red Mountain Freeway)	Serves Sky Harbor Airport; signed as exits 51A (west/airport) and 51B (east) northbound; exit 9 on Loop 202
Mesa	50.03– 50.64	80.52– 81.50	South end of Pima Freeway; North end of Price Freeway		
Tempe	51.34	82.62	52	Rio Salado Parkway / University Drive	
Tempe	52.34	84.23	53	Broadway Road	
Tempe	53.34	85.84	54	Southern Avenue / Baseline Road	Southbound exit and northbound entrance
Tempe	53.54– 55.14	86.16– 88.74	55A-B	US 60 (Superstition Freeway) – Globe, Phoenix	Northbound signed as exits 55A (west) and 55B (east), southbound signed as exits 55A (east) and 55B (west); exits 176A-B on US 60
Tempe	53.54– 55.14	86.16– 88.74	55C	Baseline Road / Southern Avenue	Northbound exit and southbound entrance
Tempe	55.36	89.09	56	Guadalupe Road	
Tempe	56.37	90.72	57	Elliot Road	
Chandler	57.36	92.31	58	Warner Road	
Chandler	58.37	93.94	59	Ray Road	
Chandler	59.37	95.55	60	Chandler Boulevard	Southbound exit and northbound entrance
Chandler	59.67– 60.99	96.03– 98.15	61A	Price Road	Southbound exit and northbound entrance
Chandler	59.67– 60.99	96.03– 98.15	61D	Loop 202 east	HOV access only; exit 50C on Loop 202
Chandler	59.67– 60.99	96.03– 98.15	61B-C	Loop 202 (Santan Freeway)	Clockwise terminus; signed as exits 61B (west) and 61C (east); exit 50A on Loop 202
1.000 mi = 1.609 km; 1.000 km = 0.621 mi: Proposed; HOV only; Incomplete access; Route transition

== See also ==
- Roads and freeways in metropolitan Phoenix
- Loop 202
- Loop 303
- Loop 505
- Agua Fria Loop 101 construction history
- Pima Loop 101 construction history
- Price Loop 101 construction history
