= SuperRedTan Interchange =

Freeway interchange in Mesa, Arizona

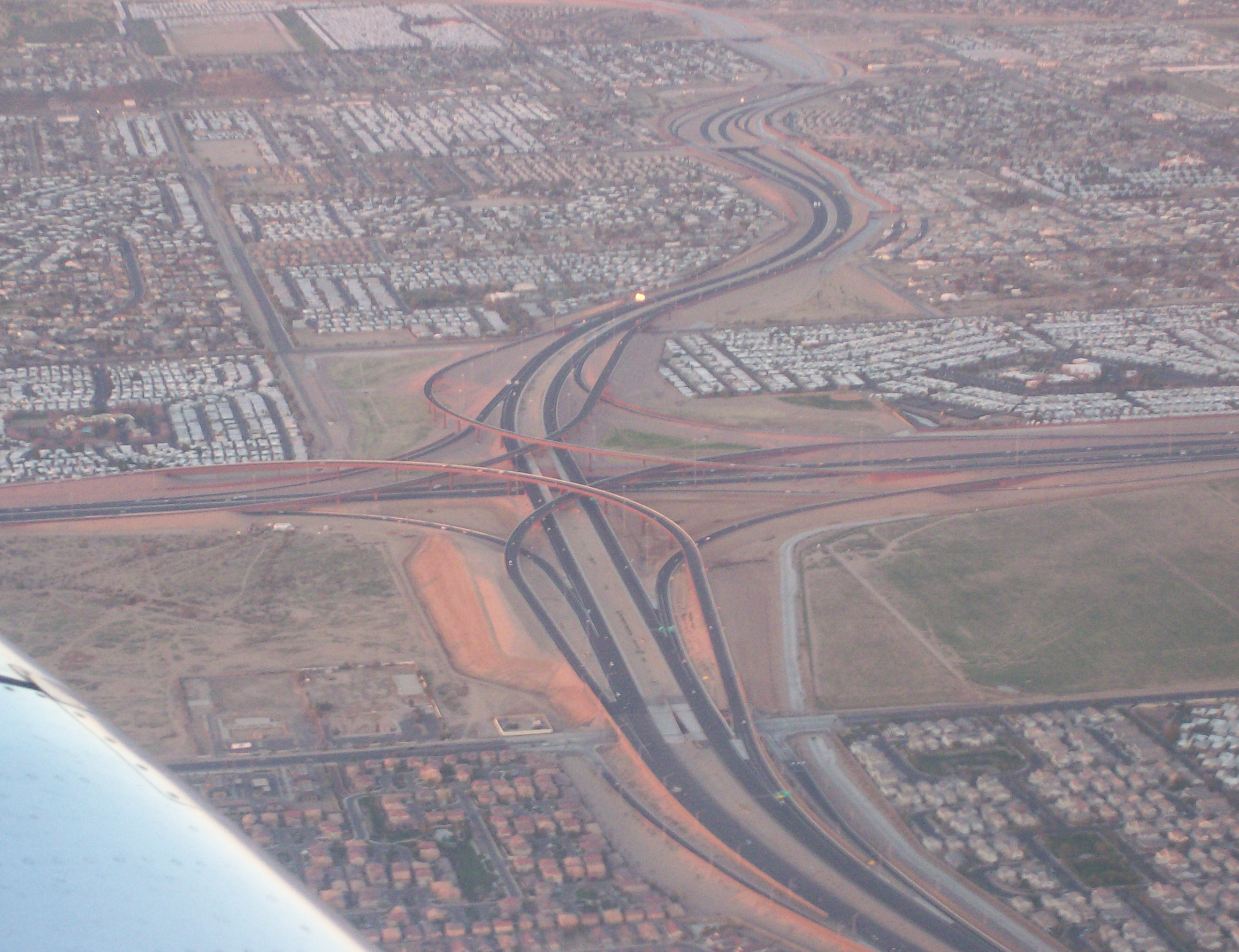
- Aerial photo of the SuperRedTan Interchange

Location
- Mesa, Arizona
- Coordinates: 33.386667°N 111.648056°W
- Roads at junction: US 60 (Superstition Freeway); SR 202 (Red Mountain Freeway / Santan Freeway)

Construction
- Opened: 2007
- Maintained by: ADOT

The SuperRedTan Interchange is a symmetrical four-level freeway interchange in eastern Mesa, Arizona. Completed in 2007, the interchange provides access between U.S. Route 60 and Loop 202. It is fully directional, meaning that a motorist traveling towards the interchange in any direction can exit onto either direction of the intersecting freeway. The interchange is said to be the first in the Valley of the Sun to include design icons on the support columns in addition to the retaining walls. There are no HOV connections at this time, although they are planned in the future.

== Etymology ==
The name SuperRedTan is a portmanteau of the names of three area freeways that intersect at this point. The name borrows the bolded portions of the following to form the word SuperRedTan.

- **Super**stition Freeway
- **Red** Mountain Freeway
- San**tan** Freeway

== Construction ==
In order to successfully create the SuperRedTan Interchange, twelve bridges were built for a combined bridge deck area of 321,000 square feet (29,800 m^{2}). All of the bridges were built using cast-in-place concrete, with post-tensioned box girders. There was 60,511 feet (18,444 m) of mechanically stabilized earth walls with some segments reaching up to 53 feet (16 m) tall. 162,040 feet (49,390 m) of soundwalls were also built within the project area to minimize the amount of decibels that the interchange was projected to generate the surrounding communities. The SuperRedTan Interchange project also consisted of widening the Superstition Freeway between Power and Crismon Roads, and constructing Loop 202 from scratch from the interchange north to University Drive. Phased construction lasted four years, from 2003 to 2007, and cost $116 million USD. It was funded through Proposition 300, which was passed in 1985 by Maricopa County voters.

== See also ==
- Mini Stack
- The Stack
