= Mini Stack =

Freeway interchange in Phoenix, Arizona

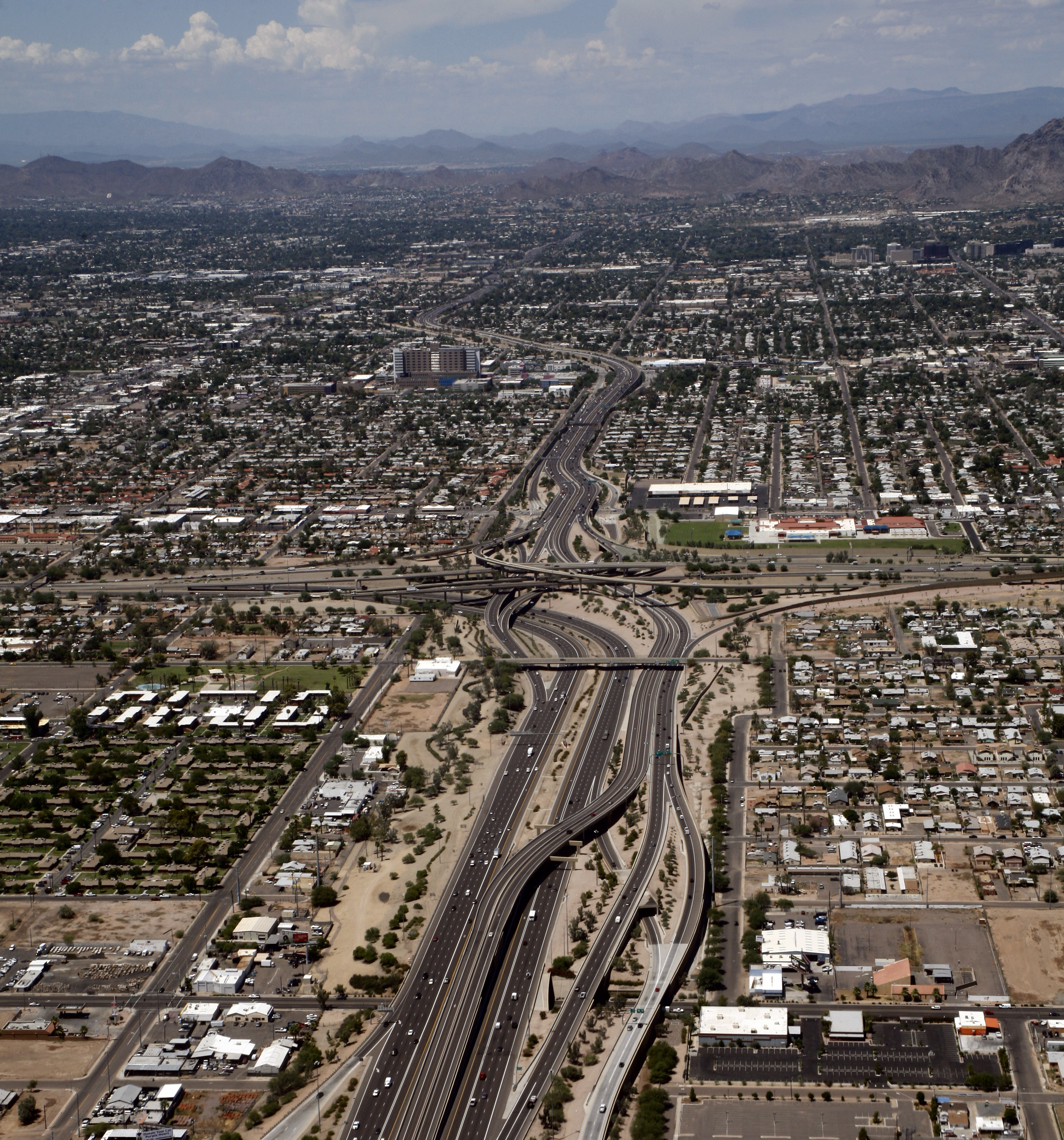
- The Mini Stack, looking north up State Route 51 in 2010.

Location
- Central Phoenix, Arizona
- Coordinates: 33°27′44″N 112°2′15″W
- Roads at junction: I-10 (Inner Loop); SR 51; SR 202 (Red Mountain Freeway)

Construction
- Type: Stack interchange
- Maintained by: ADOT

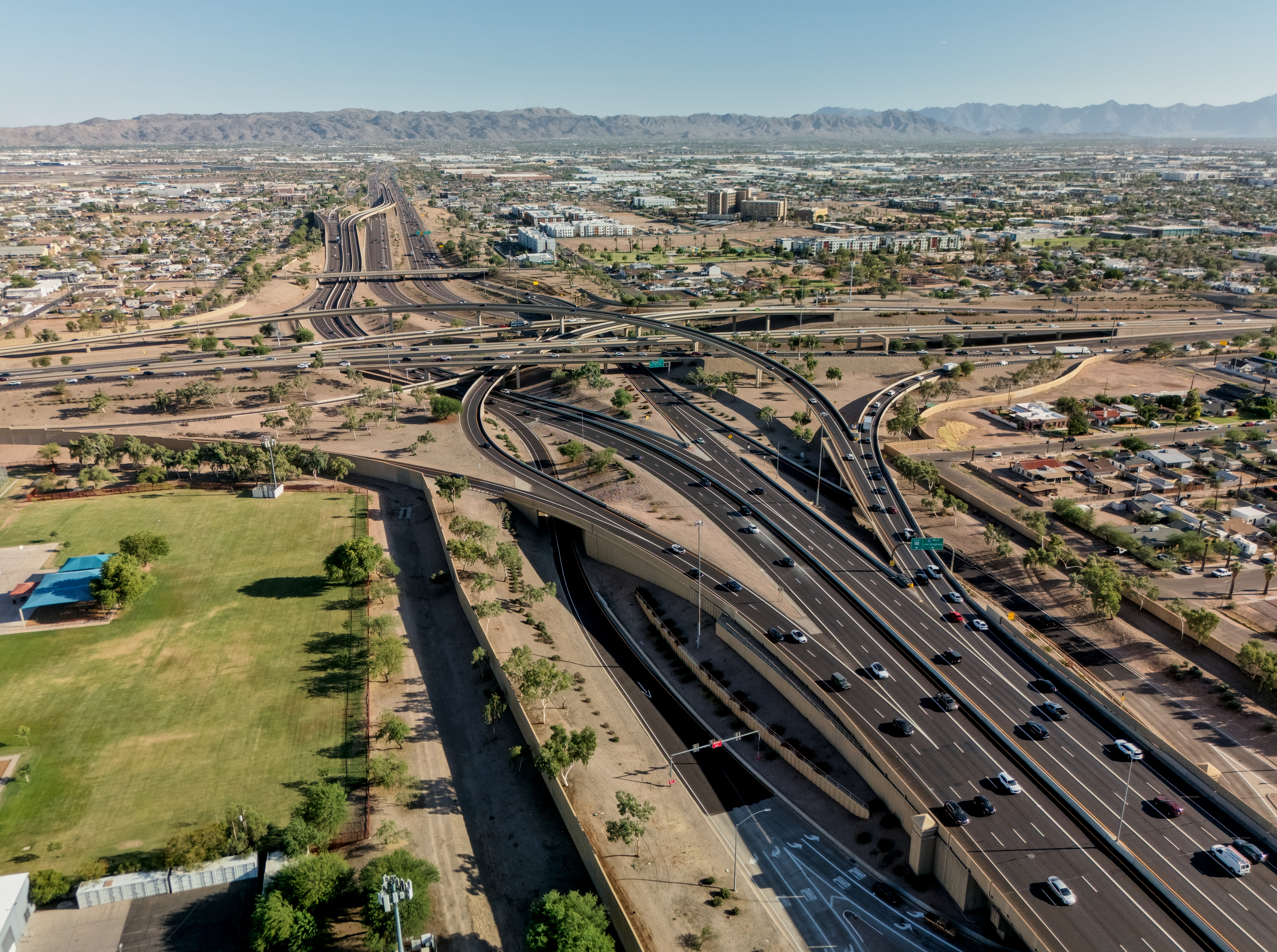
Aerial view of the interchange, looking southwest, 2025

The Mini Stack is the freeway interchange among Interstate 10, State Route 51, and Loop 202 in Phoenix, Arizona, United States, located northeast of downtown. Reconstructed in 2004 to its current setup, the interchange, which is the busiest in the state of Arizona with over 300,000 vehicles per day, provides full directional access between the three freeways, as well as HOV lane connections for southbound SR 51 to eastbound I-10, westbound I-10 to northbound SR 51, westbound Loop 202 to westbound I-10, and eastbound I-10 to eastbound Loop 202.

== Description ==
The interchange constitutes exits 147A-B-C on Interstate 10, the final southbound exits on SR 51, and exit 1A on Loop 202. The Mini Stack serves as the western terminus of Loop 202's Red Mountain Freeway segment and the southern terminus of State Route 51. Interstate 10, the only through-route in this interchange, changes cardinal direction as it passes through the Mini Stack, heading from north to west for westbound travelers and east to south for eastbound travelers.

== Delays ==
In a 2007 study performed by Forbes, the Mini Stack ranked number four in the United States in terms of delays with 22 million hours of delays each year. It was behind only Los Angeles' US 101 and I-405 interchange in California, Houston's I-610 and I-10 interchange in Texas, and Chicago's I-90/I-94 and I-290 interchange in Illinois.

== Shooting incidents ==
From August to September 2015, the Mini Stack was the spot of a number of shootings, which were connected to a larger string of shootings and other incidents that injured a teenage girl and damaged several vehicles. The Mini Stack was the location of a majority of the shootings. A suspect was later said by Governor Doug Ducey to have been taken into custody.

== See also ==
- SuperRedTan Interchange
- The Stack
