= Arizona State Route 202 =

Freeway in the Phoenix metropolitan area in Arizona, United States

State Route 202
- Loop 202 highlighted in red

Route information
- Maintained by ADOT
- Length: 77.66 mi (124.98 km)
- Existed: 1990–present
- History: Fully completed in 2019

Major junctions
- Counterclockwise end: I-10 / SR 51 in Phoenix
- SR 143 in Phoenix; Loop 101 in Mesa; SR 87 in Mesa; US 60 in Mesa; SR 24 in Mesa; SR 87 in Chandler; Loop 101 in Chandler; I-10 in Chandler
- Clockwise end: I-10 in West Phoenix

Location
- Country: United States
- State: Arizona
- Counties: Maricopa

Highway system
- Arizona State Highway System; Interstate; US; State; Scenic Proposed; Former
← SR 195	→ SR 210

Arizona State Route 202 (SR 202) or Loop 202 (202L) is a semi-beltway circling the eastern and southern areas of the Phoenix metropolitan area in central Maricopa County, Arizona. It traverses the eastern end and the southern end of the city of Phoenix, in addition to the cities of Tempe, Mesa, Chandler, and Gilbert, and is a vital route in the metropolitan area freeway system. Loop 202 has three officially designated sections along its route; the Red Mountain Freeway, the SanTan Freeway, and the Congressman Ed Pastor Freeway, also known as the South Mountain Freeway. The Red Mountain Freeway runs from the Mini Stack Interchange with Interstate 10 (I-10) and State Route 51 (SR 51) in Phoenix to the SuperRedTan Interchange with U.S. Route 60 (US 60) in Mesa. The SanTan Freeway runs from there to an interchange with Interstate 10 (I-10) in Chandler. The Congressman Ed Pastor Freeway runs from there to I-10 in western Phoenix.

Loop 202 was created after different sections of freeway within the Phoenix metro were given the designation, with the first section designated in 1990. The SanTan Freeway was completed in 2006, while the Red Mountain Freeway section was completed in 2008. The Congressman Ed Pastor Freeway officially opened on December 21, 2019.

== Route description ==
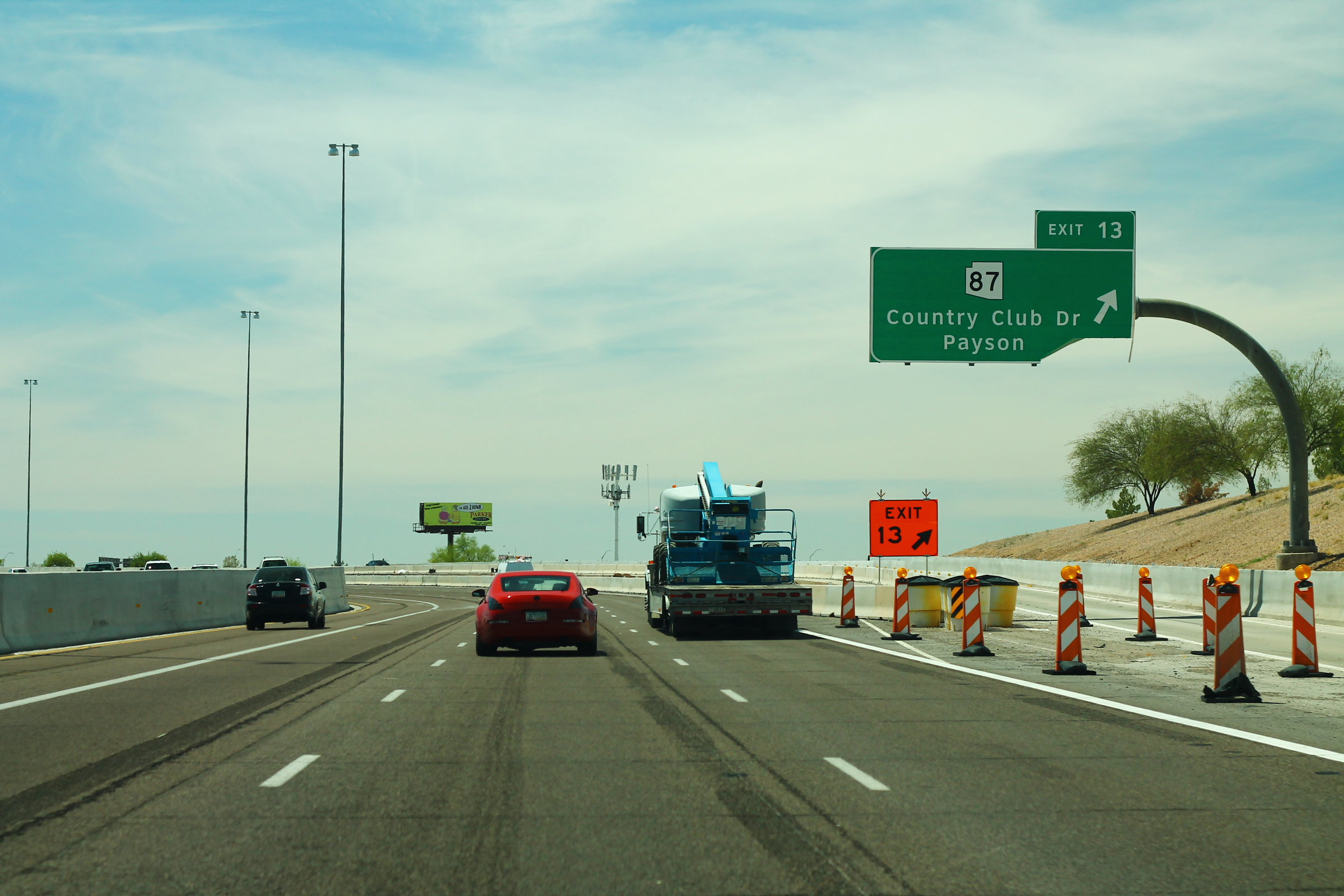
Loop 202 at exit 13

Loop 202 begins as the Red Mountain Freeway at the Mini Stack, a four-level confluence with I-10 (Inner Loop) and SR 51 (Piestewa Freeway) in Central City, Phoenix. Heading eastward, the route passes through Eastern Phoenix and encounters partial interchanges with SR 143 (Hohokam Expressway) and Sky Harbor Blvd, both which provide motorists direct access to the Sky Harbor Airport. The freeway then skims the northern bank of the Salt River as it passes through Tempe with its downtown skyline visible across the Town Lake. It then crosses the river diagonally on a long bridge before encountering its first major junction with Loop 101 around milepost 9.5. At this point, Loop 202 enters the city of Mesa. It avoids the Salt River Pima–Maricopa Indian Community lands and has a junction with SR 87. It also passes the Falcon Field and the adjunct Boeing Mesa Facility. Just shy of the Superstition Mountains, the freeway turns southward and serves the Mesa Community College and the Red Mountain District Park. At milepost 30, it encounters US 60 (Superstition Freeway) on the SuperRedTan Interchange. This segment features HOV lanes from the start of the route to University Drive, with ongoing plans to extend the lanes.

Past the interchange, Loop 202 becomes the SanTan Freeway. Near Eastmark, the route curves west and encounters the western terminus of SR 24 (Gateway Freeway). Simultaneously, Loop 202 provides access to the Phoenix-Mesa Gateway Airport and the ASU Polytechnic campus. The freeway enters Gilbert and serves the Santan Village shopping district and the Mercy Gilbert Hospital. Next, it passes through Chandler, serving the namesake airport and encountering SR 87 again about one mile (1.6 km) south of the downtown area. At milepost 50, it has a second interchange with Loop 101, which terminates here, beside the Chandler Fashion Center mall. At milepost 55, Loop 202 has a full-on junction with I-10 by Pecos Park. This section of Loop 202 has HOV lanes through I-10 out to Gilbert Road, also with long-term plans to extend the lanes eastward.

Continuing westward as the Congressman Ed Pastor Freeway (sometimes referred to as the South Mountain Freeway by locals), Loop 202 enters Phoenix as it follows the Pecos Road alignment between the gated communities of the Ahwatukee Foothills Village and the Gila River Indian Community. Near Komatke, the freeway curves northward and cuts through the western foothills of the South Mountain Preserve, with a direct interchange to a hotel and casino. The route passes through Laveen and crosses the Salt River again, which is the site of the future SR 30 junction. Loop 202 takes up the 59th Avenue alignment through the warehouse districts before finally terminating at milepost 78 with I-10 (Papago Freeway) about 6.5 miles (10.5 km) west of Downtown Phoenix.

== History ==
Old colored Arizona Loop 202 shield that has been phased out.

The final section of the Red Mountain Freeway opened on July 21, 2008, thus marking the completion of the original Regional Freeway System as approved by Maricopa County voters in 1985 by Proposition 300. The portion of the Red Mountain Freeway west of the Pima/Price Freeways was formerly known as the "East Papago Freeway," and it was initially designated SR 217. The remainder of the Red Mountain Freeway was to be SR 216. In 2006, this portion of Loop 202 was used to portray a Saudi Arabian superhighway in the 2007 film, The Kingdom. Filming also took place at Phoenix-Mesa Gateway Airport and the Arizona State University Polytechnic Campus. The city of Mesa received $40,000 for the use of the freeway from NBC Universal.

The SanTan Freeway was completed in 2006. This section of freeway was originally numbered as SR 220. It was given current designation on December 18, 1987, along with the East Papago and Red Mountain Freeway corridors and the portion of the SanTan Freeway east of Price Road. Between Price Road and the I-10 interchange, the freeway was to be part of Loop 101, and is officially designated as such, even though maps and road signs show it as part of Loop 202.

The third and final leg of Loop 202, the Congressman Ed Pastor Freeway, named in honor of longtime U.S. Representative Ed Pastor (D-AZ), received final approval from the Federal Highway Administration on March 10, 2015, with construction completed at the end of 2019. Initially, the freeway was officially named as the South Mountain Freeway during its conception and construction (and still colloquially known as such), but received its current official name on October 22, 2019. The construction phase divided it into two distinct segments: the "eastern segment" that straddles the Ahwatukee-GRIC border and the "western segment" that parallels 59th Avenue through Laveen. Together, these segments form a 21.9-mile (35.2 km) bypass around Downtown Phoenix, linking the metropolitan area's southwestern and southeastern suburbs. The Congressman Ed Pastor Freeway was to be SR 218. By July 19, 1991, it was renumbered as part of Loop 202. A six-mile (9.7 km) stretch of Loop 202, between 40th Street and 17th Avenue, includes a 16-foot (4.9 m) wide shared-use path. The pathway is on the south side of the freeway and is also open to pedestrians and cyclists. The path was added because the former Pecos Road had been a popular cycling route for years.

=== Controversy ===
The Congressman Ed Pastor Freeway was the most controversial segment of Loop 202. Construction was delayed due to tension between three groups: regional transportation planners, who insisted that the freeway was necessary to ensure smooth traffic flow in the coming decades; residents of the adjacent Ahwatukee community, who would have lost 120 homes to eminent domain depending on the road's final alignment; and leaders and residents of the adjoining Gila River Indigenous Community (GRIC), who have oscillated between opposing and supporting the freeway in recent years.

The specific alignment of the freeway, initially referred to in 1983 as the "Southwest Loop Highway", was revised several times since 1985, when Maricopa County voters originally approved its construction as part of the regional highway network envisioned under Proposition 300. In 1988, the Maricopa Association of Governments (MAG), the region's transportation planning agency, suggested an alignment of the freeway's western segment along 55th Avenue and an alignment of the eastern segment along Pecos Road. A federal study in 2001 required ADOT to reexamine those suggestions, and the task of recommending the final alignment fell to a Citizen's Advisory Team formed in 2002. In April 2006, that panel released their final recommendations to route the western portion of the freeway four miles further west to connect with Loop 101, and to reject the proposed alignment of the eastern portion along Pecos Road, suggesting that the latter be built on Gila River Indigenous Community land instead. Two months later, ADOT overruled the panel's suggestion for the western segment and opted for the current 59th Avenue alignment instead.

In February 2012, a non-binding referendum was held in the Gila River Indigenous Community on whether the eastern portion of the freeway should be built on community land several miles south of Pecos Road. Options in the referendum were to build on community land, off community land, or not at all. The "no build" option won a plurality of votes, receiving 720 votes out of a total 1,481 cast. MAG sent out a press release soon after making it clear that construction of the freeway would move forward as planned along the Pecos Road alignment. Expecting this outcome, MAG and ADOT had previously (in 2010) shrunk the freeway's footprint from 10 lanes to eight to minimize its impact on Ahwatukee. Fearing the worst possible outcome of the freeway being built without exits onto community land (as would be the case with the Pecos Road alignment), Gila River Indigenous Community residents quickly formulated plans for a new referendum that would exclude the "no build" option, leaving only "yes on Gila River or no on Gila River." The tribal government rejected this proposal in July 2013.

As late as September 2013, the freeway still faced active opposition. A non-profit group called the Gila River Alliance for a Clean Environment filed a civil-rights complaint with ADOT in July, claiming the freeway would disproportionately and adversely affect tribe members. A freeway opposition group called Protecting Arizona's Resources and Children planned an environmental lawsuit. And the Environmental Protection Agency in August 2013 raised several objections to the state's 12-year, $21 million draft environmental impact statement that had deemed construction of the freeway to be more beneficial to the environment, by improving traffic flow and thus reducing pollution, than building no freeway at all. The EPA claimed that the statement contained overly optimistic traffic projections, did not sufficiently address air quality concerns, and could harm neighboring communities and environmental resources.

By April 2017, ADOT had purchased 1,387 acres (561 ha), or 90% of the land needed for the freeway. While construction was underway in 2017 on both ends of the freeway segment, no work had occurred on a five-mile (8 km) center segment adjacent to South Mountain until a final decision was made by the Ninth Circuit Court of Appeals. A ruling was released in mid-2018 in the action brought by the Gila River Indigenous Community. The Ninth Circuit Court of Appeals rejected Gila River Indigenous Community's claims in December 2017.

=== Construction ===
In March 2015, the Federal Highway Administration (FHWA) issued a Record of Decision approving the project and selecting a build alternative. ADOT immediately thereafter commenced right-of-way acquisition and the procurement of final design and construction services in the form of a design-build-maintain contractor or "developer." The developer will have been selected at the end of 2015 (actual date was a couple months after) and freeway construction will have begun in early 2016 (construction started later that same year), with the Chandler Boulevard extension project to facilitate local access beginning in summer 2015. However, new lawsuits in June 2015 from the group Protecting Arizona's Resources and Children, the Sierra Club, and the Gila River Indigenous Community threatened to delay the freeway's construction.

On August 26, 2015, ADOT started demolition of the first houses along the route for the South Mountain Freeway (Congressman Ed Pastor Freeway).

On February 27, 2016, the contract to design, build, and maintain the freeway was awarded to Connect 202 Partners, a joint venture led by Fluor Corporation, with Fluor, Granite Construction, Ames Construction, and Parsons Brinckerhoff being responsible for the final design and construction, and with Fluor and DBi Services, LLC being responsible for maintenance for 30 years.

The first phase of construction of the South Mountain Freeway (Congressman Ed Pastor Freeway) began on September 19, 2016, with improvements to the I-10/Loop 202 (Santan Freeway) interchange.

In early 2017, ADOT announced an updated design for the freeway, including Arizona's first diverging diamond interchanges at Desert Foothills Parkway and 17th Avenue; a reconfiguration near 51st Avenue that moved the freeway interchange to Estrella Drive in order to avoid a GRIC well; and a pedestrian bridge to connect the Del Rio subdivisions bisected by the freeway.

The freeway opened to traffic in late 2019 as originally planned, with construction being finalized in late 2020. The six-mile (9.7 km) shared used path between 40th Street and 17th Avenue along the south side of the freeway and the 32nd Street interchange both opened to the general public on October 31, 2020.

The final part of Loop 202 to open was the diamond interchange with Lindsay Road (exit 43) on the SanTan Freeway section in Gilbert. Initially not a part of the existing freeway, the interchange was planned through a partnership with ADOT and the town government in order to provide direct access to the central business district and other surrounding businesses and neighborhoods. Construction on the interchange began in January 2021 and the interchange opened to traffic on September 15, 2022, following a ribbon-cutting ceremony.

== Exit list ==
The entire route is in Maricopa County.

Location	mi	km	Exit	Destinations	Notes
Phoenix	0.00	0.00		I-10 west (Inner Loop) – Los Angeles	Counterclockwise terminus; exit 147A on I-10
Phoenix	0.28	0.45	1A	I-10 east (Inner Loop) – Tucson SR 51 north	Mini Stack; serves Sky Harbor Airport; westbound exit and eastbound entrance; south end of SR 51
Phoenix	0.31	0.50	—	I-10 west	HOV interchange; westbound exit and eastbound entrance; exit 147C on I-10
Phoenix	0.75	1.21	1B	24th Street	
Phoenix	1.76	2.83	1C	32nd Street	
Phoenix	3.27	5.26	2	40th Street / 44th Street	
Phoenix	3.51	5.65	3	SR 143 south to Washington Street McDowell Road	Eastbound exit and westbound entrance; exit 5 on SR 143; access to McDowell Road via SR 143 north
Phoenix	4.37– 4.52	7.03– 7.27	4	Van Buren Street (Historic US 80) / 52nd Street	
Tempe	5.35	8.61	5	To SR 143 south – Sky Harbor Airport	Westbound exit and eastbound entrance; access via unsigned SR 202 Spur
Tempe	5.71– 6.37	9.19– 10.25	6	Priest Drive / Center Parkway	
Tempe	7.73	12.44	7	Scottsdale Road / Rural Road	
Salt River	8.22	13.23	West end of bridge		
Salt River	8.70	14.00	8	McClintock Drive	Eastbound exit and westbound entrance
Salt River	9.22	14.84	East end of bridge		
Mesa	9.66– 9.92	15.55– 15.96	9	Loop 101	Exit 51 on Loop 101
Mesa	11.07	17.82	10	Dobson Road	
Mesa	12.07	19.42	11	Alma School Road	
Mesa	12.73	20.49	12	McKellips Road	Eastbound exit and westbound entrance
Mesa	13.23	21.29	13	SR 87 (Country Club Drive) – Payson	
Mesa	16.55– 18.10	26.63– 29.13	16	Gilbert Road / McDowell Road	Signed as exit 17 westbound
Mesa	19.05	30.66	19	Val Vista Drive	
Mesa	20.07	32.30	20	Greenfield Road	
Mesa	21.08	33.92	21	Higley Road – Falcon Field Airport	
Mesa	22.17	35.68	22	Recker Road	
Mesa	22.95	36.93	23A	Power Road	Eastbound exit and westbound entrance
Mesa	23.25	37.42	Cardinal direction change: Northern quadrant (west–east) / Eastern quadrant (north–south) (Note: As indicated by guide signs on Power Road and McDowell Road First reassurance sign for "Loop 202 South" appears after Exit 23A.)		
Mesa	23.73	38.19	23B	McDowell Road	Northbound exit and southbound entrance
Mesa	24.91	40.09	24	McKellips Road	
Mesa	26.39	42.47	26	Brown Road	
Mesa	27.86	44.84	27	University Drive / Apache Trail–Main Street (Historic US 80)	Signed northbound as University Drive only
Mesa	28.92	46.54	28	Broadway Road / Main Street–Apache Trail (Historic US 80)	Signed southbound as Broadway Road only
Mesa	30.42– 30.60	48.96– 49.25	30A-B	US 60 – Phoenix, Globe	SuperRedTan Interchange; signed as exits 30A (east) and 30B (west); exit 190 on US 60
Mesa	30.42– 30.60	48.96– 49.25	South end of Red Mountain Freeway; North end of SanTan Freeway		
Mesa	31.01	49.91	31	Baseline Road	Northbound exit and southbound entrance
Mesa	32.05	51.58	32	Guadalupe Road	
Mesa	33.05	53.19	33	Elliot Road	
Mesa	33.95	54.64	34A	SR 24 east	West end of SR 24; southbound exit and northbound entrance
Mesa	34.00	54.72	Cardinal direction change: Eastern quadrant (north–south) / Southern quadrant (west–east) (Note: As indicated by overhead signs on SR 24 west. Signed as "east-west" around the Hawes Road interchange, while a reassurance marker on the eastbound on-ramp reads "North.")		
Mesa	34.15– 34.85	54.96– 56.09	34B	Hawes Road – Gateway Airport	
Mesa	35.25	56.73	34A	SR 24 east	West end of SR 24; eastbound exit and westbound entrance
Mesa–Gilbert line	36.55	58.82	36	Power Road – Gateway Airport	Also serves ASU Polytechnic Campus
Gilbert	38.55	62.04	38	Higley Road	
Gilbert	40.75	65.58	40	Williams Field Road	Serves SanTan Village Mall and Power Center
Gilbert	41.75	67.19	41	Santan Village Parkway	Eastbound exit and westbound entrance
Gilbert	42.41	68.25	42	Val Vista Drive	Serves Mercy Gilbert Hospital
Gilbert	43.54	70.07	43	Lindsay Road	Opened September 15, 2022
Gilbert–Chandler line	44.48	71.58	44	Gilbert Road	Serves Gilbert Crossroads Power Center
Chandler	45.48	73.19	45	Cooper Road – Chandler Airport	
Chandler	46.48	74.80	46	McQueen Road	
Chandler	47.55	76.52	47	SR 87 (Arizona Avenue)	Serves Downtown Chandler
Chandler	48.56	78.15	48	Alma School Road	
Chandler	49.56	79.76	49	Dobson Road	Westbound exit and eastbound entrance
Chandler	50.58	81.40	50A	Loop 101 north (Price Freeway)	Clockwise end of Loop 101; exits 61B-C on Loop 101
Chandler	50.65	81.51	50B	Price Road	Serves Chandler Fashion Center
Chandler	50.74	81.66	50C	Loop 101 north	Westbound exit and eastbound entrance via HOV lanes
Chandler	51.65	83.12	51	McClintock Drive / Chandler Village Drive	Eastbound exit and westbound entrance
Chandler	53.65	86.34	53	Kyrene Road	Serves Gila River Resorts & Casinos-Lone Butte
Chandler–Phoenix line	55.16– 55.30	88.77– 89.00	55A-B	I-10 – Tucson, Phoenix	Signed as exits 55A (west) and 55B (east); exits 161A–B on I-10
Chandler–Phoenix line	55.16– 55.30	88.77– 89.00	55C	I-10 west (Maricopa Freeway)	HOV interchange; westbound exit and eastbound entrance; exit 161C on I-10
Chandler–Phoenix line	55.16– 55.30	88.77– 89.00	West end of SanTan Freeway; East end of Congressman Ed Pastor Freeway		
Phoenix	56.73	91.30	56	40th Street	Opened on September 7, 2019
Phoenix	57.74	92.92	57	32nd Street	Opened on October 31, 2020
Phoenix	58.75	94.55	58	24th Street	Opened on November 18, 2019
Phoenix	60.59	97.51	60	Desert Foothills Parkway	Half diverging diamond interchange; opened on November 18, 2019
Phoenix	62.52	100.62	62	17th Avenue	Half diverging diamond interchange; opened on November 18, 2019
Phoenix	64.70	104.12	Cardinal direction change: Southern quadrant (west–east) / Western quadrant (north–south) (Note: As indicated by reassurance signs at 17th Avenue and Vee Quiva Way.)		
Phoenix	66.75	107.42	66	Vee Quiva Way	Opened on December 22, 2019 formerly exit 67
Phoenix	68.44	110.14	68	Estrella Drive	Double roundabout interchange
Phoenix	69.69	112.16	69	Elliot Road	
Phoenix	70.72	113.81	70	Dobbins Road	
Phoenix	71.73	115.44	71	Baseline Road	
Phoenix	72.74	117.06	72	Southern Avenue	Future exit 72A
Phoenix	73.00	117.48	72B	SR 30 (Tres Rios Freeway)	Proposed interchange
Phoenix			Bridge over the Salt River		
Phoenix	73.85	118.85	73	Broadway Road	
Phoenix	74.87	120.49	74	Lower Buckeye Road	Diamond interchange with 59th Avenue frontage roads
Phoenix	75.89	122.13	76	Buckeye Road (Historic US 80)	Diamond interchange with 59th Avenue frontage roads
Phoenix	76.90	123.76	77	Van Buren Street	Northbound exit and southbound entrance with 59th Avenue frontage roads
Phoenix	77.40– 77.66	124.56– 124.98	78A	I-10 west (Papago Freeway) – Los Angeles	Tri-stack interchange; exit 138 on I-10
Phoenix	77.40– 77.66	124.56– 124.98	78B	I-10 east (Papago Freeway) – Phoenix	Northbound exit and southbound entrance; exit 138A on I-10
Phoenix	77.40– 77.66	124.56– 124.98		I-10 east	Clockwise terminus; HOV access only; exit 138B on I-10
1.000 mi = 1.609 km; 1.000 km = 0.621 mi: HOV only; Incomplete access; Route transition

== Spur route ==
State Route 202 Spur
- Location: Phoenix–Tempe
- Length: 1.22 mi (1.96 km)
- Existed: 1993–present

A map of the unsigned spur highlighted in red.

State Route 202 Spur (Arizona Spur 202) is an unsigned state highway located in Phoenix. It begins at the Red Mountain Freeway (Loop 202) at exit 5. It continues west, intersecting the Hohokam Expressway (SR 143) and ends at Phoenix Sky Harbor International Airport. This is an unsigned route, marked by westbound exit signs from Loop 202 as Sky Harbor Boulevard. The spur route was commissioned in 1993.

=== Major intersections ===
The entire route is in Maricopa County. All exits are unnumbered.

Location	mi	km	Destinations	Notes
Phoenix	1.22	1.96	Sky Harbor Boulevard – Sky Harbor Airport	Continuation beyond western terminus
Phoenix	1.20– 1.10	1.93– 1.77	44th Street south	Former SR 153 (Sky Harbor Expressway); eastbound exit and westbound left entrance
Phoenix	1.20– 1.10	1.93– 1.77	East Economy Lot, Cell Phone Lot	Westbound left exit and eastbound left entrance
Phoenix	1.20– 1.10	1.93– 1.77	44th Street north	Former SR 153 (Sky Harbor Expressway); eastbound left exit and westbound entrance
Phoenix–Tempe line	1.03	1.66	SR 143 south to I-10	No exit ramps to SR 143 north; no eastbound entrance from SR 143 south; exits 3A-B on SR 143
Tempe	0.30	0.48	Priest Drive / Center Parkway – Downtown Tempe	Eastbound exit and westbound entrance
Tempe	0.00	0.00	Loop 202 east	Eastern terminus; exit 5 on Loop 202
1.000 mi = 1.609 km; 1.000 km = 0.621 mi: Incomplete access

== See also ==
- Roads and freeways in metropolitan Phoenix
- Loop 101
- Loop 303
- Loop 505
- Public-private partnerships in the United States
