= Arrowhead Ranch, Arizona =

Development in Glendale, Arizona

- Development
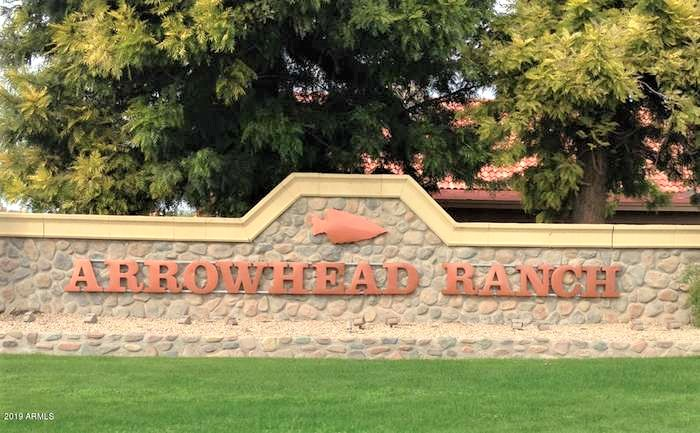
- Neighborhood entrance sign

- Location of Arrowhead Ranch in Arizona
- Coordinates: 33°40′06″N 112°11′33″W
- Country: United States
- State: Arizona
- County: Maricopa
- Elevation: 1,270 ft (387 m)
- Time zone: UTC-7 (Mountain (MST))
  - Summer (DST): UTC-7 (MST)
- Area code: 623
- FIPS code: 04-04195
- GNIS feature ID: 24718

Arrowhead Ranch is a development in the city of Glendale in Maricopa County, Arizona, United States. It has an estimated elevation of 1,270 feet (390 m) above sea level. Arrowhead Ranch is a former citrus farm. It was purchased for development in 1978 and annexed by Glendale in 1979.
