= Arizona State Route 51 =

State highway in Phoenix, Arizona, United States

State Route 51
- Piestewa Freeway
- SR 51 highlighted in red

Route information
- Maintained by ADOT
- Length: 16.70 mi (26.88 km)
- Existed: 1987–present
- NHS: Entire route

Major junctions
- South end: I-10 in Phoenix
- Loop 202 in Phoenix
- North end: Loop 101 in Phoenix

Location
- Country: United States
- State: Arizona
- Counties: Maricopa

Highway system
- Arizona State Highway System; Interstate; US; State; Scenic Proposed; Former
← SR 50	→ US 60

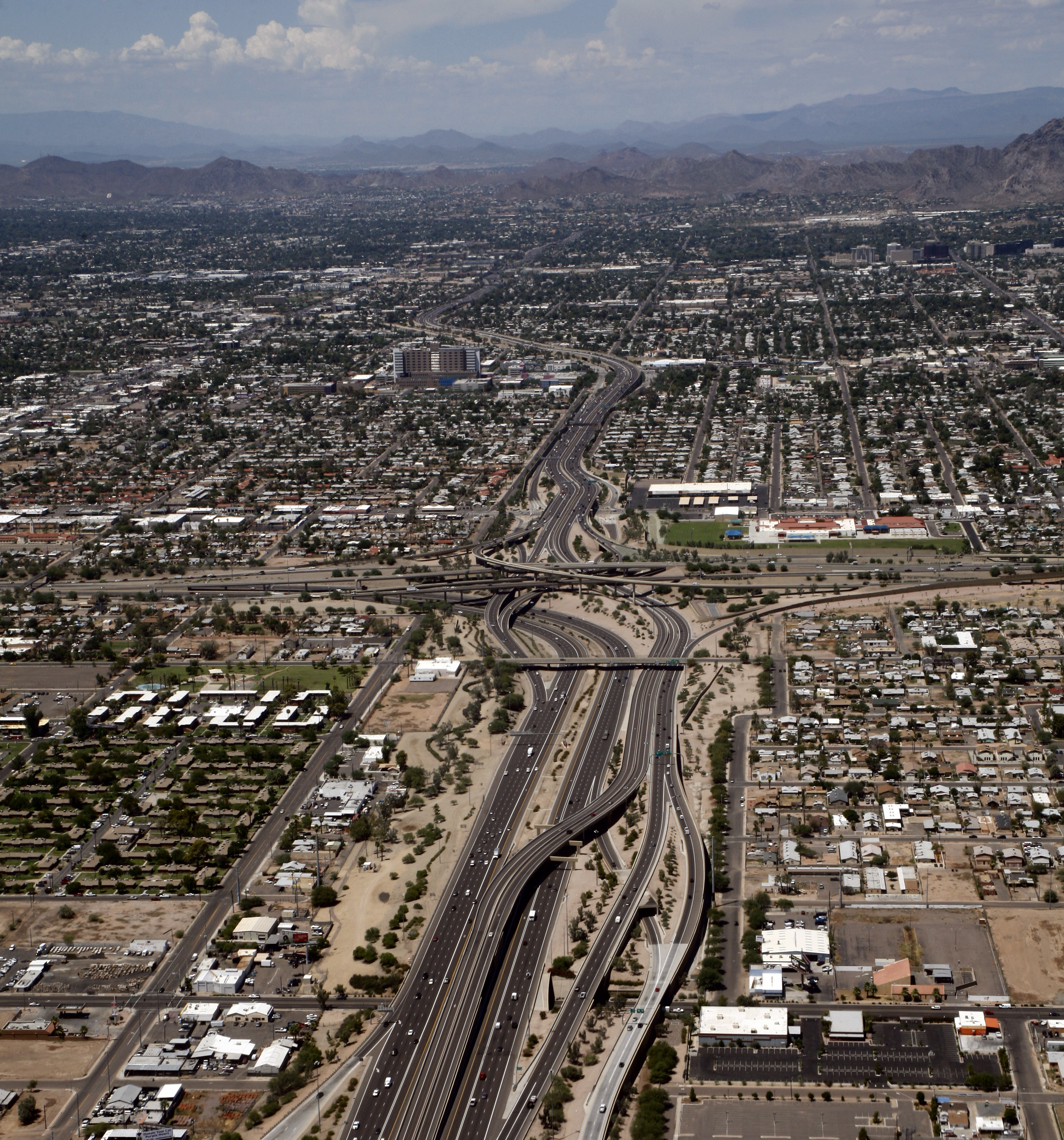
The Piestewa Freeway at its southern terminus, the "Mini Stack" with Interstate 10 and Loop 202. Photo looks north as SR 51 winds through residential areas and the Phoenix Mountain Preserve.

Arizona State Route 51 (SR 51), also known as the Piestewa Freeway, is a numbered state highway in Phoenix, Arizona. It connects Interstate 10 and Loop 202 just outside downtown Phoenix with Loop 101 on the north side of Phoenix, making it one of the area's major freeways. It is a largely north–south route and is known for traversing the Piestewa Peak Recreation Area. The peak was named after Lori Piestewa, the first Native American woman to die in combat in the U.S. military. Prior to this time, the freeway was known as the Squaw Peak Parkway, a name considered offensive by Native Americans. Rapid growth and increased traffic demand on the east side of Metro Phoenix made the Piestewa Freeway necessary.

The freeway was proposed at least as far back as 1955. It was intended to become part of a never-constructed Interstate 510.

== Route description ==
SR 51 begins at an interchange with I-10 and Loop 202 immediately east of downtown Phoenix. The route heads north from the interchange through the northern sections of Phoenix. The freeway travels through some major areas of Phoenix and past some major services such as the Phoenix Children's Hospital, Arizona Heart Hospital and Heart Institute, and the Camelback Colonnade at 20th Street and Camelback Road. The highway then begins to climb to the top of Dreamy Draw, a mountain passage between Piestewa Peak and North Mountain, before descending into the Paradise Valley area of North Phoenix. It reaches its northern terminus at a three-way interchange with Loop 101 by Desert Ridge. The entire length of SR 51 features HOV lanes.

== History ==
Interstate 510
- Location: Phoenix
- Existed: 1958–1968

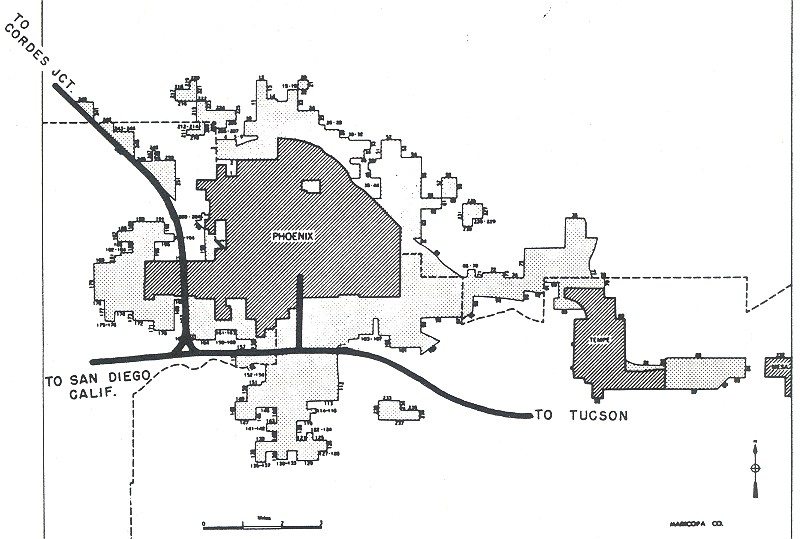
The Phoenix inset from an early plan for the Interstate Highway System showing what would become the Piestewa Freeway as a spur from what would become Interstate 10.

General Location of National System of Interstate Highways, a 1955 proposal for what would become the Interstate Highway System, included a spur freeway from what would become Interstate 10, proceeding north along a route similar to the modern Piestewa Freeway. The road was later designated I-510.

The routing of the freeway later appeared in route logs in 1968 under the designation of State Route 510 and the name Squaw Peak Freeway.

The freeway was originally named the Squaw Peak Parkway. The modern usage of the word squaw, which can be perceived as a derogatory term for Native American women, had led to guidelines from the U.S. Board on Geographic Names that the word should be phased out of the names of natural features. In 2003, Governor Janet Napolitano announced her intent to rename the peak for which the freeway was named. That same year, U.S. Army specialist and Arizona native Lori Piestewa was killed in the 2003 invasion of Iraq. According to U.S. Army records, Piestewa was the first known Native American woman to be killed on foreign soil while serving in combat for the military. As such, Governor Napolitano thought this was an appropriate new name for the peak, which by extension affected the name of the freeway.

The original five miles (8 km) of the freeway between McDowell Road and Glendale Avenue were constructed by the city of Phoenix (as the Squaw Peak Parkway) between 1986 and 1991. The first overpass to be completed was in 1986 at Osborn Road. In 1987, the bridge over the Grand Canal had been completed, as well as the overpass at McDowell Road and the southbound connector to eastbound I-10. On December 18, 1987, SR 510 was renumbered SR 51. Also completed in 1987 were the overpasses at Colter Street and Missouri Avenue that passed over the freeway. Several more overpasses were completed in 1988 including those located at Indian School Road, Highland Avenue, Camelback Road and Bethany Home Road. Also in 1988, the state established a corridor for the freeway from Glendale Avenue north to Loop 101 after rapid growth and increased traffic demand on the east side of Metro Phoenix made the extension necessary. In 1989, the bridge over the Arizona Canal was complete, as well as the overpass at Thomas Road. The southbound Route 51 connector ramp to eastbound Loop 202 and the 20th Street overpass were completed in 1990. The city of Phoenix had the freeway completed as far north as Glendale Avenue in 1991. During much of the road's early days in the 1990s, several decorative pots were mounted on top of the noise mitigation walls, which were a source of controversy at the time of their installation due to cost and aesthetics. One resident installed a gold toilet in protest. Some were taken down, however, during the ADOT reconstruction project between McDowell Road and Shea Boulevard in 2004.

In 1992, the southern portion was handed over to the Arizona Department of Transportation. Since then, it has been extended to Loop 101 and retrofitted with rubberized asphalt, standardized signage, an additional general purpose lane to create three lanes in each direction, and a high-occupancy vehicle lane up to Loop 101.

In 2007, construction began to widen the Piestewa Freeway between Shea Boulevard and the Loop 101 interchange to include a high occupancy vehicle lane in each direction and on ramps to Loop 101 eastbound. Work was completed in the summer of 2008.

In March 2016, a new interchange from the road's existing terminus at Loop 101 to an intersection with Black Mountain Boulevard opened.

== Exit list ==
The entire route is in Phoenix, Maricopa County.

mi	km	Exit	Destinations	Notes
0.00	0.00		I-10 east – Tucson I-10 west / Loop 202 east (Red Mountain Freeway) – Los Angeles	Southern terminus; Mini Stack; exit 147B on I-10; exit 1A on Loop 202; serves Sky Harbor Airport
0.87	1.40	—	I-10 east	HOV interchange; exit 147C on I-10; no airport access
1.10	1.77	1	McDowell Road	
2.11	3.40	2	Thomas Road / 20th Street	
3.17	5.10	3	Indian School Road	
3.92	6.31	4A	Highland Avenue / Camelback Road	Northbound exit and southbound entrance
4.43	7.13	4A	Colter Street / Camelback Road	Southbound exit and northbound entrance; administratively referred to as exit 4B
5.18	8.34	4B	Bethany Home Road	Administratively referred to as exit 5; exit ramps provide direct access to North 18th Street (Local traffic)
6.20	9.98	5	Glendale Avenue / Lincoln Drive	Administratively referred to as exit 6; exit ramps have direct entrance from Ocotillo Road (to northbound exit ramp) and Morten Avenue (to southbound exit ramp)
7.64	12.30	7	Northern Avenue	
8.54	13.74		26th Street	Southbound entrance only
9.62	15.48	8	32nd Street	Northbound exit and southbound entrance
10.09	16.24	9	Shea Boulevard	
11.09	17.85	10	Cactus Road	
12.11	19.49	11	Thunderbird Road	Northbound exit and southbound entrance
13.14	21.15	12	Greenway Road	
14.16	22.79	13	Bell Road	
15.18	24.43	14	Union Hills Drive	
16.23	26.12	—	Loop 101 east – No access to Tatum Boulevard	HOV interchange; exit 29B on Loop 101
16.70	26.88	15A	Loop 101 east	Northern terminus; exit 29A on Loop 101
16.70	26.88	15B	Black Mountain Boulevard	Northbound exit and southbound entrance
16.70	26.88		Loop 101 west	Northern terminus; exit 29 on Loop 101
1.000 mi = 1.609 km; 1.000 km = 0.621 mi: HOV only; Incomplete access

== See also ==
- List of state highways in Arizona
