= Chandler Municipal Airport =

Airport in Maricopa County, Arizona

- IATA: QSD; ICAO: KCHD; FAA LID: CHD

Summary
- Airport type: Public
- Owner: City of Chandler
- Serves: Chandler, Arizona
- Elevation AMSL: 1,243 ft (379 m)
- Coordinates: 33°16′09″N 111°48′40″W

Map
- Location in Arizona

Runways
Direction	Length		Surface
Direction	ft	m	Surface
4L/22R	4,401	1,341	Asphalt
4R/22L	4,870	1,484	Asphalt

Helipads
Number	Length		Surface
Number	ft	m	Surface
H1	100	30	Concrete

Statistics (2011)
- Aircraft operations: 161,750
- Based aircraft: 333
- Source: Federal Aviation Administration

Chandler Municipal Airport (ICAO: KCHD, FAA LID: CHD) is in Maricopa County, Arizona, United States, 3 miles (2.6 nmi; 4.8 km) southeast of Chandler, which owns it. The National Plan of Integrated Airport Systems for 2011–2015 categorized it as a general aviation reliever airport.

Chandler Municipal is one of the nation’s 50 busiest general aviation airports. It adds to Arizona's economy by bringing in more than $53 million annually. No airlines operate out of Chandler and none plan to in the near future.

Most U.S. airports use the same three-letter location identifier for the FAA and IATA, but Chandler Municipal is CHD to the FAA and has no IATA code (IATA had assigned CHD to Phoenix-Mesa Gateway Airport in nearby Mesa, Arizona – since redesignated by the IATA as AZA).

== Facilities ==
The airport covers 550 acres (220 ha) at an elevation of 1,243 ft (379 m). It has two asphalt runways:

- 4L/22R measuring 4,401 ft × 75 ft (1,341 m × 23 m)
- 4R/22L measuring 4,870 ft × 75 ft (1,484 m × 23 m)

It has one concrete helipad:

- H1 measuring 100 ft × 100 ft (30 m × 30 m)

The airport has built and improved a heliport facility, airport signage, and aircraft parking space by 10 acres with 90 tie-down spaces. These improvements were made over six years and cost about $7 million. The privately owned parking spaces are at 100% capacity. Affiliated Property Management is the company/HOA that controls the privately owned hangars.

In the year ending April 25, 2011, the airport had 161,750 aircraft operations, an average of 443 per day: 98% general aviation, 2% air taxi, and <1% military. 333 aircraft were then based at the airport: 86% single-engine, 9% multi-engine, 3% helicopter, 1% jet, and 1% ultralight.

Operations data (takeoffs or landings):

- 2004: 233,219
- 2005: 227,150
- 2006: 268,093
- 2007: 260,636
- 2008: 254,267
- 2009: 205,771

== 2021 mid-air collision ==
2021 Chandler mid-air collision
Accident
- Date: October 1, 2021
- Summary: Mid-air collision
- Site: Chandler, Arizona, U.S.
- Total fatalities: 2
- Total survivors: 2

First aircraft
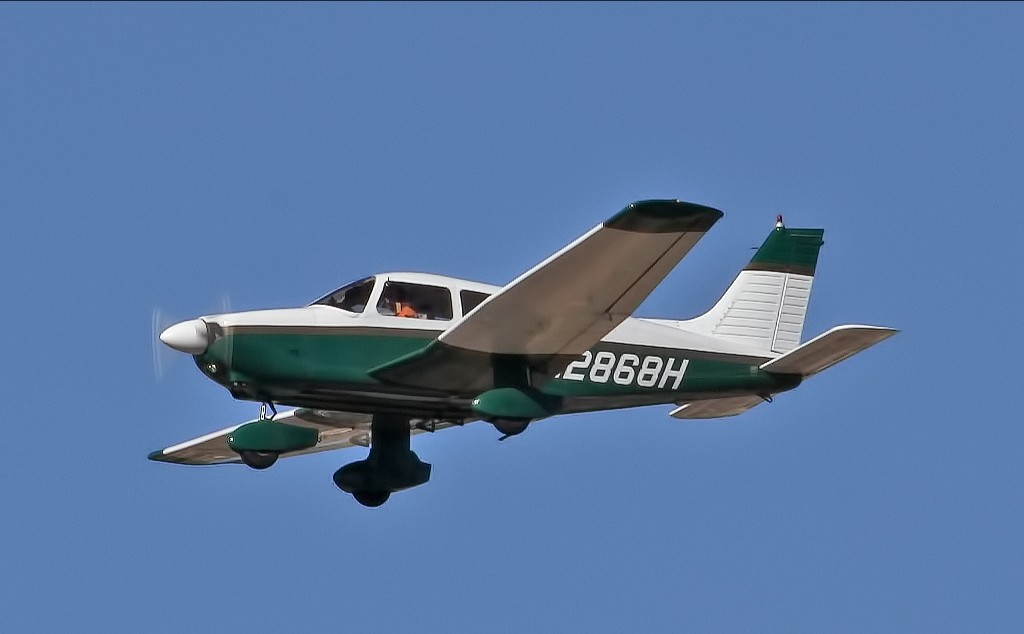
- N2868H, the Piper PA-28 involved in the accident
- Type: Piper PA-28-181 Archer II
- Operator: Flight Operations Academy LLC
- Registration: N2868H
- Passengers: 0
- Crew: 2
- Survivors: 2

Second aircraft
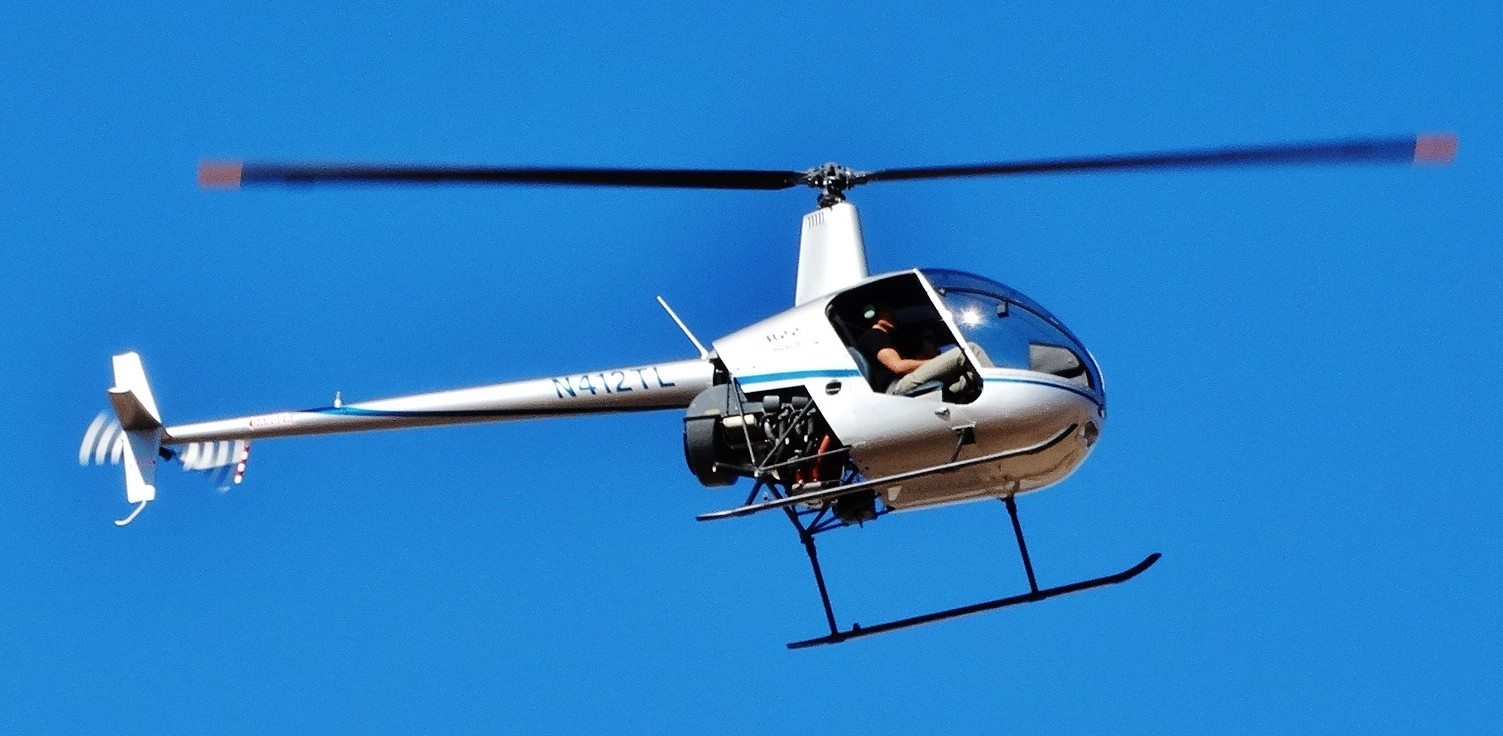
- N412TL, the Robinson R22 involved in the accident
- Type: Robinson R22
- Operator: Delta Leasing Inc DBA operated by Quantum Helicopters
- Registration: N412TL
- Passengers: 0
- Crew: 2
- Fatalities: 2

In 2021, an aerial collision between two aircraft over Chandler occurred. A Piper PA-28-181 Archer II on a training flight collided with a Robinson R22 near Phoenix. The crash occurred at 07:30 local time.

The Piper PA-28-181 Archer II landed safely with damage to its landing gear. The Robinson R22 crashed and burst into flames.

== See also ==
- List of airports in Arizona
