= 2025 Arizona wildfires =

Natural disasters in the USA

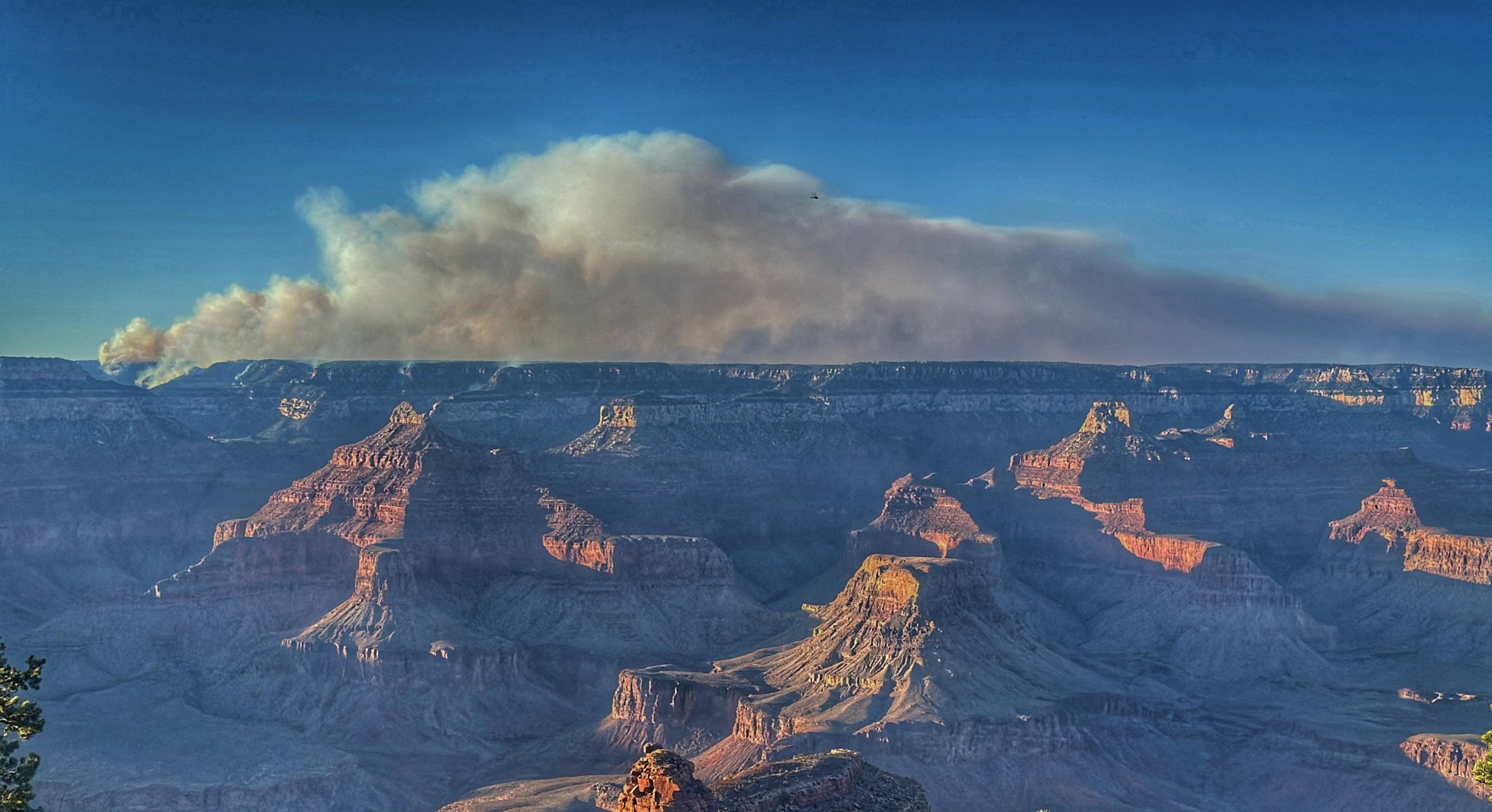
- Smoke from the Dragon Bravo Fire on July 30, seen from the Grand Canyon

Statistics
- Total fires: 291 (January 1 - April 7)
- Total area: 5,802 acres (2,348 ha; 23.48 km^{2}) (January 1 - April 7)

A series of wildfires burned throughout U.S. state of Arizona during 2025.

== Background ==
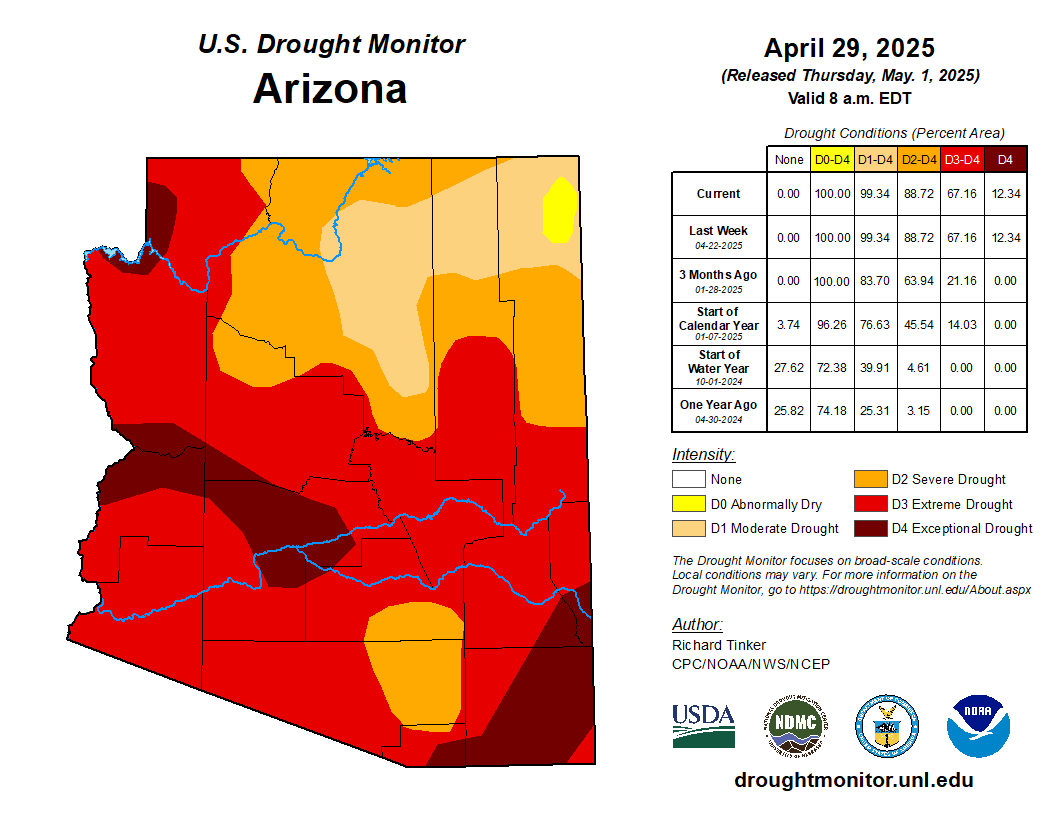
Arizona Drought Monitor on April 29, 2025

Historically, while "fire season" in Arizona began in April in desert areas and May around the Mogollon Rim with peak activities near July, there is now a fire risk year-round. Arizona is drought prone, with precipitation much different between the deserts and mountains. When the snow pack on the mountain melts, the moisture can reduce the risk of wildfire events. However, climate change can raise the snow line, reduce snow pack, decrease runoff, or cause earlier snowmelt. A risk of decreasing precipitation and dry monsoons could heighten fire risks. Heavy rainfall can allow vegetation to grow, and many of these plants quickly dry out in just hours.

== Summary ==
By the end of spring (June 20), wildfires in Arizona had burned approximately 104,000 acres (42,000 ha), marking a slightly above-average start to the 2025 season. The early uptick in activity was largely attributed to wind-driven grass and brush fires across central and southern Arizona, fueled by prolonged drought conditions and unseasonably high temperatures.

The first fatality of the season occurred on May 27, when a firefighter was injured during suppression efforts on the Copper Ridge Fire near Superior and later died from heat-related causes.

During July, extreme heat and a series of dry thunderstorms ignited numerous large wildfires in northern and eastern Arizona. The Black Mesa Fire in Navajo County and the Santa Teresa Fire in Gila County each burned tens of thousands of acres, threatening several small communities and forcing temporary evacuations. By July 31, over 612,000 acres (248,000 ha) had burned statewide, one of the most active mid-season totals since 2020.

In August, widespread monsoonal rainfall moderated fire behavior across much of central and southern Arizona. However, several lightning-induced fires persisted in remote northern areas, including the Kaibab Plateau Fire and Sitgreaves Complex, which continued burning into early September under dry post-monsoon conditions.

By late September, cooler temperatures and scattered rainfall helped end most major fire activity. The 2025 Arizona wildfire season has so far burned an estimated 678,000 acres (274,000 ha) statewide—roughly 40 percent above the five-year average—causing moderate ecological impacts but relatively limited structural loss due to early detection and coordinated response efforts.

== List of wildfires ==
The following is a list of fires that burned more than 1,000 acres (400 ha), produced significant structural damage, or resulted in casualties.

Name	County	Acres	Start date	Containment date (Note: Containment means that fire crews have established and secured control lines around the fire's perimeter. These lines are artificial barriers, like trenches or cleared vegetation, designed to stop the fire's spread, or natural barriers like rivers. Containment reflects progress in managing the fire but does not necessarily mean the fire is starved of fuel, under control, or put out.)	Notes	Ref.
Horton	Gila, Coconino	8,346	December 15 (2024)	February 4	Fire crews conducted firing operations to hold the fire and make sure it didn't impact neighborhoods in the area. Burned in rough terrain in Tonto National Forest.	
Gap	Graham	2,000	January 7	January 10	Burned in the Ash flat area.	
Spider	Navajo	1,702	March 27	March 31	The fire caused $90,000 in damages. Burned near Whitecone and State Route 77.	
Stronghold	Cochise	2,138	April 28	May 7	Burned in the Dragoon Mountains southeast of Tucson.	
Blind	Coconino	6,329	May 4	May 25	Lightning-caused in Mogollon Rim ranger district.	
Bryce	Graham	3,294	May 7	May 20	Human-caused. Burned about 1.5 miles (2.4 km) southeast of Eden.	
Coyote	Apache	1,280	May 11	May 15	Likely started by structure fire.	
Greer	Apache	20,308	May 13	May 26	Unknown cause. Evacuations issued for Greer and Eagar, and portions of SR 260, SR 261, and SR 373 were closed.	
Cody	Pinal	1,223	May 21	June 4	Evacuations were issued for Oracle. Destroyed five residential buildings, damaged one, and destroyed eight other structures.	
Ranch	Santa Cruz	2,751	June 4	June 11	Burned about 19 miles (31 km) southeast of Patagonia. Caused by lightning and spread from windy and dry conditions.	
Basin	Coconino	9,145	June 5	June 26	Lightning-caused. Burned about 20 miles (32 km) northwest of Flagstaff.	
Oak Ridge	Apache	11,027	June 28	July 15	Unknown cause. Burned about 5 miles (8.0 km) southwest of Window Rock. Evacuations for Oak Springs and Hunters Point.	
Dragon Bravo	Coconino	145,504	July 4	September 29	Lightning-caused. Evacuations for the North Rim of the Grand Canyon.	
White Sage	Coconino	58,985	July 9	September 10	Lightning-caused. Burned 15 miles (24 km) southeast of Fredonia and 980 square miles were under an evacuation order.	
Billy	Gila	27,574	July 9	September 15	Lightning-caused. Burned 15 miles (24 km) south of Young	
Cabin	Coconino	1,048	July 15	August 2	Lightning-caused. Burned in Sitgreaves National Forest.	
Bronco	Gila	18,041	August 3	September 8	Lightning-caused. Burned 30 miles (48 km) northeast of San Carlos.	
Indian Creek	Gila	3,000	August 5	September 6	Lightning-caused. Burned 10 miles (16 km) southwest of Whiteriver.	
Goodwin	Graham	1,059	August 6	September 7	Lightning-caused. Burned 12 miles (19 km) southeast of Bylas.	

Perimeters of 2025 Arizona wildfires (map data)

== See also ==
- 2025 United States wildfires
