= Arizona State Route 473 =

State highway in Arizona, United States

State Route 473
- Hawley Lake Road

Route information
- Maintained by ADOT
- Length: 9.91 mi (15.95 km)
- Existed: 1967–present
- Restrictions: Closed winters

Major junctions
- South end: At Hawley Lake Dam
- North end: SR 260 east of McNary

Location
- Country: United States
- State: Arizona

Highway system
- Arizona State Highway System; Interstate; US; State; Scenic Proposed; Former
← US 466	→ Loop 505

State Route 473, also known as SR 473, is a state highway in east-central Arizona, United States, that travels from State Route 260 to Hawley Lake. Hawley Lake is almost always the coldest place in Arizona.

SR 473 is marked as a spur of SR 73, but while the road itself continues to roughly intersect with that route in Fort Apache, it is not numbered beyond Hawley Lake and therefore does not connect to its parent at all. SR 473 was actually named as such because the adjacent stretch of SR 260 was formerly part of SR 73.

== Route description ==
SR 473 is a 9.91-mile (15.95 km) highway located entirely within the Fort Apache Indian Reservation that links Hawley Lake to SR 260. The southern terminus of the highway is located at the Hawley Lake Dam. The southernmost 0.83 miles (1.34 km) of the highway are unpaved. The highway initially heads east along the north side of the lake before curving back towards the northwest away from the lake. It continues to the northwest before going through a series of hairpin turns before heading towards the east. The highway curves back towards the north before taking heading back towards the northeast. The highway curves back to the north as it reaches its northern terminus at SR 260. Portions of the highway are seasonally closed due to the road becoming impassable during winter weather.

== History ==
The route was defined in 1967 by the Arizona Department of Transportation. Since establishment, no major realignments have occurred.

== Junction list ==
The entire route is in Apache County.

Location	mi	km	Destinations	Notes
Hawley Lake	9.91	15.95	Hawley Lake Dam	Southern terminus; road continues as Trout Creek Road
	0.00	0.00	SR 260 – McNary, Springerville, Eager	Northern terminus; former SR 73
1.000 mi = 1.609 km; 1.000 km = 0.621 mi
