= Greer Fire =

2025 wildfire in Arizona, USA

- Part of the 2025 Arizona wildfires
- Date: May 13, 2025 – May 26, 2025
- Location: Apache–Sitgreaves National Forests, Apache County, Arizona, Arizona, US
- Coordinates: 34° 01' 20.4', -109° 27' 12.6'

Statistics
- Status: Extinguished
- Perimeter: 100% contained
- Burned area: 20,308 acres (8,218 ha)

Map
- Greer Fire (map data)

The Greer Fire was a wildfire that burned in the Apache–Sitgreaves National Forests and threatened the town of Greer, Arizona. The fire burned 20,308 acres (8,218 ha), and was 100% contained on May 26, 2025. Greer was also severely affected by the Wallow Fire in 2011.

== Progression ==
The area was put under a red flag warning before the fire had started, warning residents of conditions that would allow a fire to spread rapidly.

Three state roads were closed due to the fire: State Routes 260, 261, and 373.

Evacuation orders were issued for Greer, South Fork, and Amity.

The fire was fully contained on May 26, despite interior pockets of the fire continuing to burn.

== Cause ==
The Greer Fire District made a post on Facebook saying the cause was a damaged electrical transformer, then later redacted their statement in another post. A spokesperson for the Forestry Department, Tiffany Davila, announced that the origin was still unknown but being investigated.

== Effects ==
There were minimal smoke impacts from the fire in Eagar and Springerville.

An emergency closure was declared by Apache-Sitgreaves National Forest on the National Forest lands. There were evacuations for Greer, South Fork, and portions of Eagar. Portions of State Route 260, State Route 261, and State Route 373 were closed.

Multiple structures were destroyed and power was shut off in and near Greer. Eagar and Springerville released a joint Declaration of Emergency.
