= Arizona State Route 273 =

State highway in Arizona, United States

State Route 273

Route information
- Maintained by ADOT
- Length: 19.26 mi (31.00 km)
- Existed: 1957–present
- Tourist routes: White Mountain Scenic Road

Major junctions
- South end: Big Lake Road near Big Lake
- North end: SR 260 near McNary

Location
- Country: United States
- State: Arizona

Highway system
- Arizona State Highway System; Interstate; US; State; Scenic Proposed; Former
← SR 266	→ SR 277

State Route 273 (SR 273) is a state highway in Apache County, Arizona that runs from its junction with SR 260 west of Eagar to its junction with SR 261 north of Big Lake. It winds through the forest but is overall a north–south route.

== Route description ==
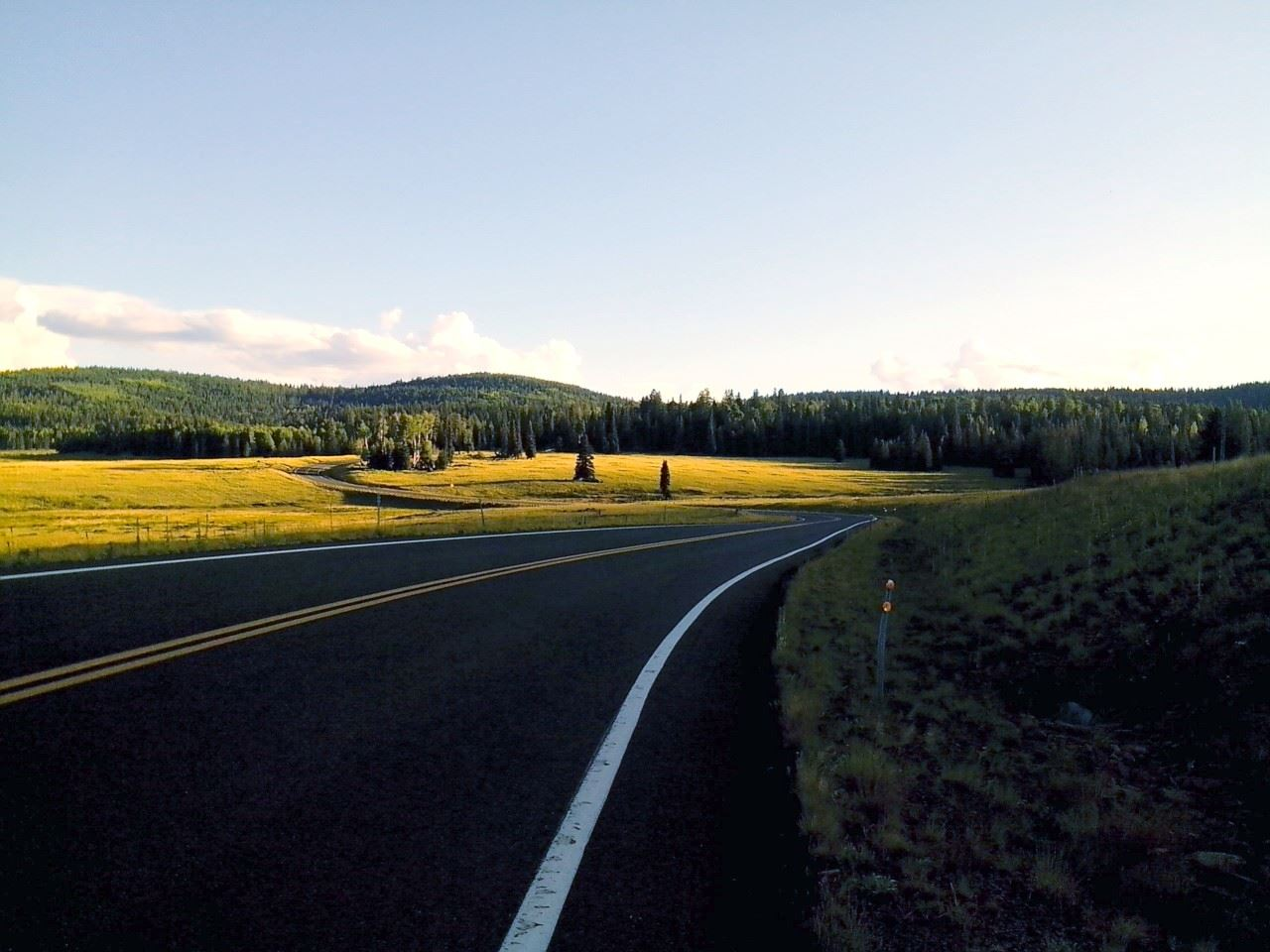
SR 273 looking south, between MP 388 and MP 389

The northern terminus of SR 273 is located at SR 260 within the Fort Apache Indian Reservation. SR 273 was designated in 1955 from SR 73 (this section now part of SR 260) southeast and northeast to SR 73, with a spur southeast. On August 16, 1991, the section from the spur northeast was renumbered as SR 261. SR 273 was rerouted over SR 273 spur, eliminating the duplication of mileposts. It heads southeast from this intersection and passes along the east side of Sunrise Lake. The highway curves towards the east to the south of Sunrise Lake as it heads towards White Mountain Reservoir. The highway leaves the Indian Reservation as it approaches the reservoir. It curves towards the southeast as it passes the reservoir. It curves towards the south as it intersects National Forest Service Road 87. The highway continues towards the south before curving back towards the east to a junction with SR 261. The highway curves back towards the south at this intersection. It continues south to its southern terminus at Big Lake.

SR 273 travels through sparsely populated areas and does not pass through any cities or towns. It serves primarily as an access road to the Sunrise Ski Resort, one of the few ski resorts in Arizona, as well as general access to the White Mountains. It also provides access to Big Lake. The segment between Sunrise and SR 261 was formerly an unpaved gravel road.

== Junction list ==
The entire route is in Apache County.

Location	mi	km	Destinations	Notes
Big Lake	19.26	31.00	Big Lake Road	Southern terminus; road continues as Three Forks Road
	16.76	26.97	SR 261 north – Eagar	SR 261 closed winters; former SR 273 east
Stretch of road closed winters
Fort Apache Indian Reservation	5.48	8.82	Winter closure gate at Fort Apache Indian Reservation boundary	
Fort Apache Indian Reservation	0.00	0.00	SR 260 – Show Low, Eagar, Springerville	Northern terminus; former SR 73
1.000 mi = 1.609 km; 1.000 km = 0.621 mi
