= Arizona State Route 63 =

Arizona State Route 63 may refer to:

- Arizona State Route 63 (1932–1951), a former state highway in the Petrified Forest National Park
- Arizona State Route 63 (1961–1981), a former state highway in Apache County, replaced by US 191
