= Bog Creek =

Stream in Apache County, Arizona

Coordinates: 34°02′37″N 109°46′41″W

Bog Creek is a stream in Apache County of northeastern Arizona. It is a tributary to the North Fork White River.

The stream source area is on the Mogollon Rim east of Bog Butte and west of Cinder Pit Mountain at elevation 8,620 feet (2,630 m). The stream flows west to southwest crossing Arizona Route 260 and then flows over the Rim to its confluence with the North Fork just below the Rim.

The headwaters arise at and the confluence with the North Fork is at . The confluence is at 7,027 feet (2,142 m).

Bog Creek was so named on account of its boggy character after heavy rain.

== See also ==
- List of rivers of Arizona
