= Arizona State Route 277 =

State highway in Arizona, United States

State Route 277

Route information
- Maintained by ADOT
- Length: 30.66 mi (49.34 km)
- Existed: 1962–present

Major junctions
- South end: SR 260 near Heber-Overgaard
- SR 377 near Aripine
- North end: SR 77 in Snowflake

Location
- Country: United States
- State: Arizona
- Counties: Navajo

Highway system
- Arizona State Highway System; Interstate; US; State; Scenic Proposed; Former
← SR 273	→ SR 279

State Route 277 (SR 277) is a highway in Navajo County, Arizona, that runs from its junction with SR 260 in Heber-Overgaard to its junction with SR 77 in Snowflake. It is a north–south route.

== Route description ==
SR 277 is a 30.66-mile (49.34 km) highway that provides a direct route connecting Heber-Overgaard and Snowflake. It does not pass through any other cities or towns. The western terminus is located at an intersection with SR 260 east of Heber-Overgaard. The highway heads northeast from this intersection and curves towards the east prior to an intersection with SR 377, which heads northeast to Holbrook while SR 277 continues to the east. It then heads east to an intersection with a spur route that provides access to a paper mill. SR 277 heads northeast from this junction and curves back towards the east as it enter the Snowflake city limits. The highway reaches its eastern terminus at an intersection with SR 77 in Snowflake.

== Junction list ==
The entire route is in Navajo County.

Location	mi	km	Destinations	Notes
Heber-Overgaard	0.00	0.00	SR 260 – Overgaard, Show Low, Heber	Southern terminus
	6.83	10.99	SR 377 north to I-40 – Holbrook	
	15.41	24.80	SR 277S north (Catalyst Road)	
Snowflake	30.66	49.34	SR 77 (Main Street) to I-40 – Holbrook, Taylor, Show Low	Northern terminus; road continues east as Snowflake Boulevard
1.000 mi = 1.609 km; 1.000 km = 0.621 mi

== Spur route ==
State Route 277 Spur
- Location: Navajo County
- Length: 1.20 mi (1.93 km)

State Route 277 Spur (SR 277S or SS 277), is a short spur of SR 277 located in unincorporated Navajo County. Locally, it is also known as Catalyst Road. The route ends at the Novo Star Wood Products paper mill.
