= Earl Park =

Earl Park may refer to:

- Earl Park, Indiana, a town in Richland Township, Benton County, Indiana, United States
- Earl Park, Arncliffe, a former sports field in Sydney, Australia
- Earl Park Lake, a lake in the White Mountains of Arizona, United States
