= Arizona State Route 81 =

Arizona State Route 81 may refer to:

- Arizona State Route 81 (1927–1938), a former state highway that existed from 1927–1938 in Cochise, Graham, Greenlee, Apache in the state of Arizona
- Arizona State Route 81 (1962–2003), a former state highway that existed from 1962–2003 in Apache County
