= Arizona State Route 377 =

Highway in Arizona

State Route 377

Route information
- Maintained by ADOT
- Length: 33.83 mi (54.44 km)
- Existed: 1971–present

Major junctions
- South end: SR 277 near Heber-Overgaard
- North end: SR 77 in Holbrook

Location
- Country: United States
- State: Arizona
- Counties: Navajo

Highway system
- Arizona State Highway System; Interstate; US; State; Scenic Proposed; Former
← SR 373	→ SR 386

State Route 377, also known as SR 377, is a state highway in northeast Arizona traveling from northeast to southwest; it begins at a junction with State Route 77 south of Holbrook, goes past Dry Lake, to end at State Route 277 east of Heber-Overgaard. Parts of the highway are also known as Dry Lake Road and Heber Road.

== Route description ==
SR 377 is a 33.83-mile (54.44 km) highway in eastern Arizona. The southern terminus of the highway is located at an intersection with SR 277 northeast of Heber. It heads northeast from this intersection and keeps this general heading for its entire route. It reaches its northern terminus at an intersection with SR 77 south of Holbrook.

== History ==
State Route 377 was defined by the Arizona Department of Transportation in 1971 exactly the way it is now. The designation ran from SR 277 to SR 77. Since then, the road has not undergone any major realignments.

== Junction list ==
The entire route is in Navajo County.

Location	mi	km	Destinations	Notes
	0.00	0.00	SR 277 – Snowflake, Heber, Overgaard	Southern terminus
Holbrook	33.83	54.44	SR 77 to I-40 – Holbrook, Snowflake	Northern terminus; road continues as Code Talkers Drive
1.000 mi = 1.609 km; 1.000 km = 0.621 mi
