= White Sage Fire =

2025 wildfire in Arizona, U.S.

- Part of the 2025 Arizona wildfires
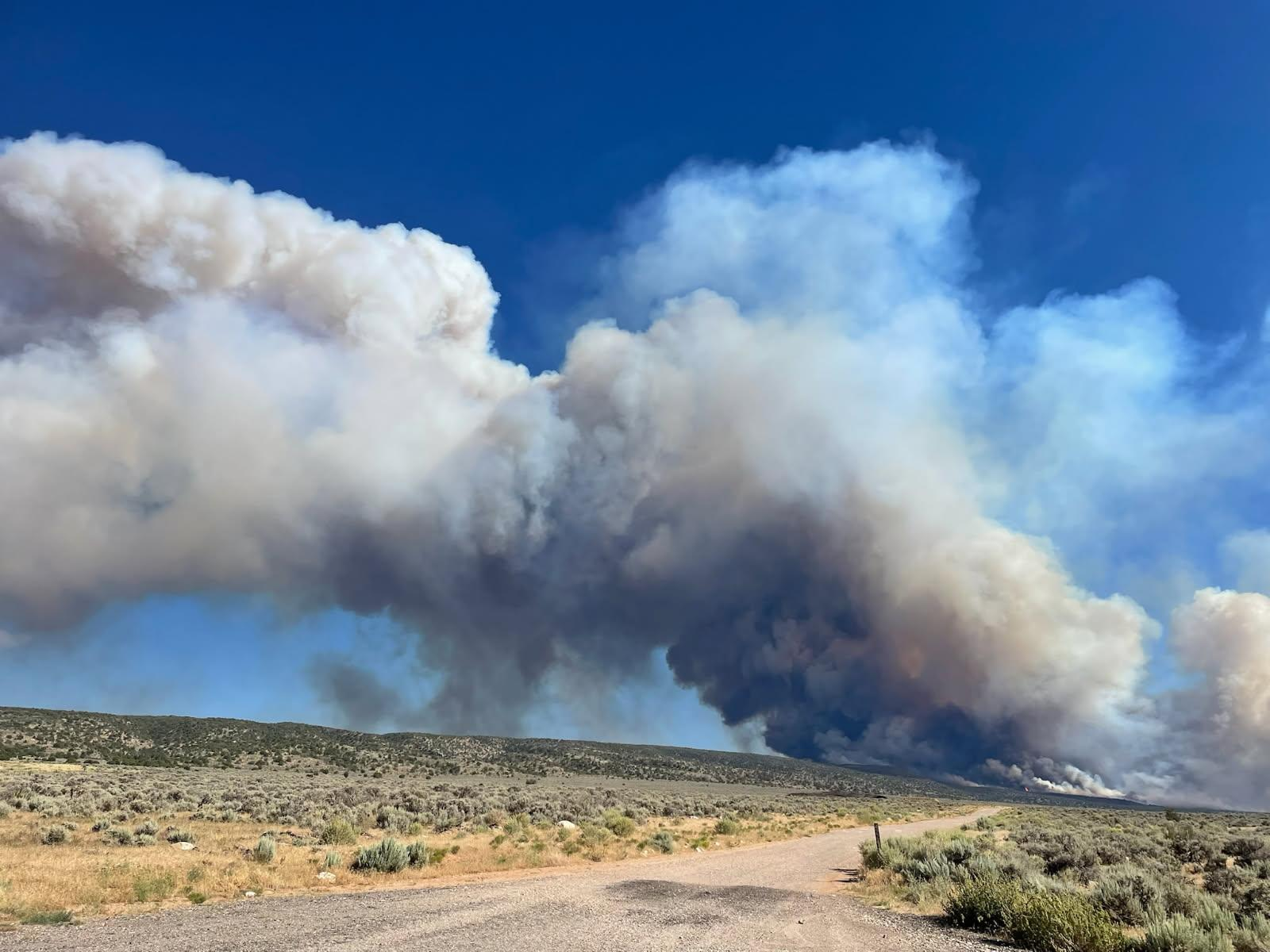
- The White Sage Fire on July 11, estimated at 1,000 acres
- Date: July 9, 2025 – September 15, 2025
- Location: Jacob Lake, Arizona & Kaibab National Forest
- Coordinates: 36°47′22″N 112°15′28″W

Statistics
- Burned area: 58,985 acres (23,870 ha)

Ignition
- Cause: Lightning

Map
- Perimeter of White Sage Fire (map data)
- Location in northern Arizona

The White Sage Fire was a wildfire that started near Jacob Lake, Arizona on July 9, 2025. The fire was labeled 100% contained on September 15th, 2025. It burned 58,985 acres (23,870 ha) of land.

== Background ==
Most wildfires in Arizona occur between March and late July before the Arizona monsoon. While most are human-caused, dry lightning is also a leading cause. In Arizona, natural wildfires that burn at low severity eliminate excessive vegetation and increase forest biodiversity. Grazing in the Western United States throughout the nineteenth century killed off native vegetation and introduced flammable native species, and strict wildfire suppression policies throughout the twentieth century has led to a buildup of fuels. Abnormal heat and drought, often incurred by climate change, increase burn severity in wildfires that damage native species.

The annual summer monsoon accounts for nearly 50 percent of annual precipitation in Arizona. The 2024 monsoon saw below-average rainfall totals across the state, primarily in central and western Arizona. Flagstaff experienced slightly below average precipitation. Arizona suffered from a severe snowfall deficit after the 2024–25 winter. By the end of the meteorological winter between December 1 and February 28, Flagstaff received 8.5 inches (220 mm) of snow (compared to the average of 58.7 inches (1,490 mm)) and Phoenix Sky Harbor International Airport saw 0.03 inches (0.76 mm) of total precipitation; both locations experienced their third-driest winter up to that point. On July 8, 2025, northern and western Coconino County was experiencing moderate to severe drought, as mapped by the United States Drought Monitor. (Note: The United States Drought Monitor classifies dry or drought-stricken areas in five levels: D0 is abnormal dryness and D4 is exceptional drought. Moderate drought corresponds to D1, typically characterized by the 10.01 to 20.00 percentile of typical precipitation. Severe drought corresponds to D2, typically characterized by the 5.01 to 10.00 percentile of typical precipitation.)

The rapid initial spread of the White Sage Fire was attributed to high temperatures, sustained winds 15 to 20 miles per hour (24 to 32 km/h), extremely dry conditions paired with low relative humidity, and low fuel moisture values. (Note: Fuel moisture is the measure of the amount of water in vegetation, represented as a percentage of that vegetation dry.) High temperatures also caused the Bureau of Land Management to close several walking and running trails in the area. The fire burned when Energy Release Components were at record high levels, (Note: The National Wildfire Coordinating Group defines the Energy Release Component as "the computed total heat release per unit area (British thermal units per square foot) within the flaming front at the head of a moving fire.") contributing to fuels reactive to wildfire spread and ignition.

Along with the Dragon Bravo Fire, the White Sage Fire predominantly burned through the largest contiguous stand of ponderosa pine in Arizona that has historically benefited from prescribed burns; quaking aspen, whose populations prevail at higher elevations and historically benefited from prescribed burns; pinyon-juniper woodlands, along the North Rim and in the Grand Canyon itself; sagebrush 3 to 10 feet (0.91 to 3.05 m) tall; and invasive grasses such as cheatgrass and buffelgrass that rapidly dry out. The 2020 Mangum Fire (which burned approximately 70,000 acres (28,000 ha) in the same region) left behind dead trees, further fueling the White Sage Fire.

== Events ==
=== July ===
The White Sage Fire seen on July 9, 2025

A thunderstorm passed through Coconino County on July 9, 2025. Shortly after 7:00 pm Mountain Standard Time (MST), (Note: All times are in Mountain Standard Time (MST) unless otherwise noted.) a vegetation fire was reported on Bureau of Land Management (BLM) land was reported near White Sage, Arizona, 15 miles (24 km) southeast of Fredonia. Wildland firefighters managed to respond soon after the wind-driven fire was reported. The National Interagency Fire Center (NIFC) listed the fire at 250 acres (100 ha) by 11 pm that night. The fire spread into the morning, estimated at 431.5 acres (174.6 ha) by the NIFC by noon. NASA satellites first detected heat from the fire on July 10. Strong winds and hot, dry conditions drove the White Sage Fire into the North Kaibab Ranger District of Kaibab National Forest. Management transitioned to a Type 2 incident management team that day. Growing to 1,000 acres (400 ha), go now evacuation orders were issued north of Jacob Lake and south of the community to Forest Service Road 212; get set evacuation notices were issued in the immediate area of Jacob Lake. (Note: In Arizona, evacuations are divided into three levels: a "ready" notice alerts residents to prepare for hazards in their area, a "set" notice advises resident to be aware significant danger nearby, and a "go" notice alerts residents life-threatening danger is in their area and they should evacuate.) The White Sage Fire threatened future access to State Route 67, prompting the National Park Service (NPS) to evacuate 500 visitors from the North Rim of Grand Canyon National Park, and residents and employees near the North Rim were under shelter-in-place orders. U.S. Route 89A was closed north towards Fredonia, remaining open south towards Page. Fire behavior was considered "extreme" due to 15 to 20 miles per hour (24 to 32 km/h) winds described as "erratic". Crews observed spotting (Note: A spot fire originates from an ember that crosses the existing fire perimeter, often carried by wind.) and torching. (Note: In a wildfire, torching is when small stands or individual trees are engulfed by flames, burning from the trunk up.)

Overnight, employees of the USFS, Coconino County, and the Arizona Game and Fish Department evacuated areas in Kaibab National Forest near Jacob Lake. Evacuation orders were expanded north to the Arizona–Utah border, east to House Rock Valley Road, south to Grand Canyon National Park, and west to Kaibab National Forest. The evacuation area encompassed 980 square miles (2,500 km^{2}), with officials reporting the evacuation zone was very large out of "an abundance of caution." The White Sage Fire was now over 9,000 acres (3,600 ha). Strong, gusty winds complicated suppression efforts as the fire grew to 10,973 acres (4,441 ha), spreading towards Jacob Lake. An extreme heat warning was issued in the fire's area with forecast temperatures up to 116 °F (47 °C).

On July 12, an infrared flight mapped the White Sage Fire was mapped at 19,153 acres (7,751 ha). The BLM precautionarily closed land near the White Sage Fire. Fire crews focused on establishing containment lines near the origin of the fire to protect the community of White Sage. Rapid growth was seen on the northern and eastern ends of the fire, driven by strong steady winds and dry conditions throughout the day; grass fuels and dead trees from the Mangum Fire contributed to intense fire activity.

The White Sage Fire doubled in size by July 13, reaching a size of 40,186 acres (16,263 ha). The southern edge of the fire saw minimal growth, although wind-blown embers created some spot fires. Crews prepared for firing operations near the fire's downhill descend into the Vermillion Cliffs region to slow the fire's potential spread. Crews utilized Winter Road (which had been prepared with fuel reduction work during the Mangum Fire) as a potential containment feature north of the White Sage Fire. The southern perimeter saw the most activity as it made intense runs, exhibiting torching and running behavior. (Note: In a wildfire, running behavior generally occurs when the fire is quickly moving through ground vegetation.) Containment lines were strengthened near Lonesome Ranch to prevent spread onto private land. The BLM predicted "gusty and variable winds" coupled with low relative humidity were expected to last throughout the day. Nearly 400 personnel were responding to the White Sage Fire before Great Basin Complex Incident Management Team 6 on July 13. Multiple firefighting planes cumulatively dropped 179,597 US gallons (679,850 L; 149,546 imp gal) of fire retardant along the fire's northern and southern perimeters. The fire jumped U.S. Route 89A.

On the morning of July 14, 467 personnel were assigned to the White Sage Fire. Predictions showed weather conditions similar to July 13, with high temperatures in the from the upper 80 °F (27 °C) to lower 90 °F (32 °C) range (varying with elevation), low relative humidity hovering around 10–13 percent, and gusty winds up to 25 miles per hour (40 km/h) that previously challenged suppression efforts. The fire was reported at 49,286 acres (19,945 ha) that morning. The western perimeter of the fire near the ignition point continued to hold. Thunderstorm and lightning activity occurred near the fire, resulting in gusty winds up to 35 miles per hour (56 km/h) that presented additional concerns for spread. At an update around 4 pm, an employee of the BLM reported the fire at approximately 50,000 acres (20,000 ha) with 500 firefighters assigned. He reported the westernmost edge near the point of ignition was contained. Minimal growth was seen on the fire's northern perimeter, and the eastern flank had encountered different fuels and was holding. Officials attributed the less significant spread to more favorable weather conditions and "the hard work of firefighters".

The White Sage Fire was reported at 51,922 acres (21,012 ha) by 9 am on July 15. The perimeter near the point of ignition continued to hold, and efforts in the area began transitioning to suppression repair efforts. (Note: Often taking place before a wildfire is fully contained, suppression repair efforts involve methods to combat potential soil erosion and other natural impacts caused by suppression itself.) Fire crews established a spike camp (Note: A spike camp is a smaller camp separate from the main fire camp, often established in an area where travel time between the two points would be extensive.) along the most active, southeastern portion of the fire. Significant activity was seen along the northern perimeter near Winter Road, but crews managed to hold the fire south of the road. Crews were stationed and holding the fire where it was spreading eastwards towards House Rock Valley Road. The southeastern flank near Jacob Lake held; crews made preparations in the immediate vicinity of Jacob Lake to prepare for potential spread. Mapped at 52,989.8 acres (21,444.2 ha), the White Sage Fire was reported to be four percent contained that night. By the end of the day, 572 personnel were engaging in suppression efforts.

By the next morning, 667 firefighters were assigned to the White Sage Fire. Fire crews focused on extending the handline (Note: A handline on a wildfire is a line manually constructed around the perimeter with hand tools.) on the southern side of the fire to U.S. Route 89A in an effort to reinforce the southern perimeter. The incident meteorologist predicted thunderstorms (associated with monsoonal moisture) in the afternoon and evening, forecasting strong outflow winds to unpredictably blow smoke and erratic winds gusting up to 50 miles per hour (80 km/h). Lightning started the so-called Swamp Fire that burned 4 acres (1.6 ha) between the White Sage and Dragon Bravo fires; it was soon suppressed. The southeastern edge of the White Sage Fire received precipitation, leading to activity primarily diminishing to smoldering. (Note: Smoldering combustion in a wildfire is the slow and flameless incineration of fire fuel. No flames are visible during this process.) Containment increased to nine percent that evening, with progress made along the southern perimeter. The White Sage Fire was mapped at 58,559 acres (23,698 ha). There was no additional growth, but the change in size was attributed to more accurate infrared mapping showing pockets of vegetation previously thought to be unburned updated. These pockets of vegetation primarily composed of lighter fuels, making heat harder to detect.

Progression map of the White Sage Fire for July 9–17, 2025

Suppression operations across the White Sage Fire were varied on July 17. Along the southern and southwestern perimeters, suppression efforts had largely transitioned to mop-up. (Note: Mop-up operations typically involve the extinguishing or removal of flaming material near a wildfire's perimeter, often to strengthen control lines or reduce residual smoke.) Firing operations occurred along the northeastern, eastern, and southeastern edges of the perimeter to eliminate unburned vegetation and strengthen containment lines. Rain and thunderstorms were predicted to occur that afternoon and evening again, with periods of heavy rainfall, erratic and rapidly changing winds over 50 miles per hour (80 km/h), and hazardous lightning. Containment increased to 17 percent. Precipitation further minimized the White Sage Fire's activity, particularly along the northeastern perimeter. The storm system increased relative humidity and decreased temperature. The BLM reported crews made "very good progress" along the northwest, northeast, east, southeast, and southern flanks of the fire. To maintain firefighter safety and reduce fatigue, especially in rugged terrain, crews on the northern and southern edges began transitioning to night operations that night.

The White Sage Fire was reported at 58,630 acres (23,730 ha) the morning of July 18. Crews continued to strengthen containment lines on the fire's northern edge south of Buckskin Mountain and examined the fire's perimeter to ensure there was no remaining heat. Firefighters worked on expanding containment lines in the steep, rugged terrain near the northwestern edge of the fire; crews were patrolling firelines created by bulldozers. Hazard tree removal operations occurred along U.S. Route 89A. Firefighters increased preparedness in regard to vegetation's role in fire activity, as it was expected to dry out. Lower fire activity due to moisture the previous day allowed firefighters to combat the fire with a more direct approach. Evacuation orders near Lonesome Ranch were lifted around 1:45 pm. The southern edge of the fire near Jacob Lake was contained, and first responders began "building a plan" for future wildfires in the community. The fire was reported twenty-seven percent that evening after progress was made along the northwestern perimeter.

Improved infrared mapping placed the White Sage Fire at 58,639 acres (23,730 ha) the next morning, with 811 personnel responding. Suppression repair work, through breaking down berms from bulldozers and replanting native grasses, began along the southwestern perimeter, although crews were still engaging in mop-up. Fire activity was forecast to increase over the following days during a warming trend, so crews focused on direct line construction. Containment increased to 31 percent after lines were strengthened on the western edge of the fire. Firing operations took place near the southeastern portion of the White Sage Fire, contributing to 203 acres (82 ha) of spread to 58,842 acres (23,813 ha). On July 20, the incident meteorologist expected fire activity to increase with higher temperatures and moderate winds. Lightning started two fires south of the White Sage Fire. Several fire crews, fire engines, and helicopters were diverted to the lightning-caused Oak Point Fire. It spread to 85 acres (34 ha) but was soon suppressed.

Massive flames from the White Sage Fire engulfing trees on July 21

Firefighters began building direct lines along the eastern perimeter on July 21, despite the difficult terrain. Unmanned Aerial Systems operated infrared detection flights used to find previously unidentified hot spots. The number of personnel decreased to 627. Containment increased to 44 percent, and much of the White Sage Fire was going mop-up and suppression repair efforts. The fire was reported at 58,979.7 acres (23,868.2 ha) as islands of unburned vegetation within the perimeter were mapped as burned.

=== Cause ===
The cause of the fire is believed to be due to lightning.

=== Containment ===
On September 15th, 2025, the fire was labeled 100% contained.

== Impact ==
=== Closures and evacuations ===
Only July 10 all residents in areas north and south of Jacob Lake were ordered to evacuate.

Part of nearby U.S. Route 89A was closed.

== See also ==
- 2025 Arizona wildfires
- List of Arizona wildfires
