= Indian Pine, Arizona =

Unincorporated community in Navajo County, Arizona, United States

- Unincorporated community
- Location within the state of Arizona Indian Pine (the United States)
- Coordinates: 34°04′48″N 109°54′19″W
- Country: United States
- State: Arizona
- County: Navajo
- Elevation: 7,176 ft (2,187 m)
- Time zone: UTC-7 (Mountain (MST))
  - Summer (DST): UTC-7 (MST)
- ZIP codes: 85935
- Area code: 928
- FIPS code: 04-35150
- GNIS feature ID: 30351

Indian Pine is a populated place on the Fort Apache Indian Reservation in Navajo County, Arizona, United States. It is located at the junction of Arizona State Route 260 and the northern end of Arizona State Route 73.
