= Earl Park Lake =

Lake in Apache County, Arizona

- Location within Arizona
- Location: Fort Apache Indian Reservation, Apache County, Arizona, United States
- Coordinates: 33°58′56″N 109°44′04″W
- Basin countries: United States
- Surface area: 47 acres (19 ha)
- Surface elevation: 8,251 ft (2,515 m)

Earl Park Lake is a lake located in Apache County on the White Mountains Apache Indian Reservation in the White Mountains of Arizona. It is located 0.5 miles (0.80 km) south of Hawley Lake and 16.6 mi (26.7 km) from Whiteriver at an elevation of 8,251 ft (2,515 m). The lake is a reservoir on Earl Creek formed by Earl Park Dam with a surface area of 47 acres (19 ha). Fish varieties found include brook, rainbow, brown, and cutthroat trout.

As of 2008, the lake is restricted to flyfishing. Regulations require artificial lures and catch and release fishing.
