= McNary Elementary School District =

School district in Arizona, United States

McNary Elementary District

Location
- McNary, Arizona United States
- Coordinates: 34°04′28″N 109°51′20″W

District information
- Type: Public
- Grades: K–8
- Superintendent: Dr. Gregory Fowler
- Schools: McNary Elementary School
- NCES District ID: 0404860

Students and staff
- District mascot: Green Devils

Other information
- Website: www.mcnary.k12.az.us

McNary Elementary School

Location
- 108 North Pollack; McNary, Apache County, Arizona, 85930-0598; United States; 34°04′28″N 109°51′20″W

Information
- School type: Public Elementary school
- School district: McNary Elementary District
- NCES School ID: 040486000376
- Teaching staff: 10
- Grades: K–8
- Enrollment: 183
- Mascot: Green Devils
- Website: www.mcnary.k12.az.us

McNary High School

Location
- 108 North Pollack; McNary, Apache County, Arizona, 85930-0598; United States; 34.074493°N 109.855658°W

Information
- School type: Public High school
- Closed: 1980
- Grades: 9–12
- Mascot: Green Devils

The McNary Elementary School District is the K–8 school district for the town of McNary, Arizona, in the United States. It operates one school, the McNary Elementary School. The district once was affiliated with a high school, the McNary High School, which closed in 1980. The old high school, located in the same place where the district and the elementary school now are, used the current district mascot, the Green Devils. The district superintendent is Mary Ann Wade.
