= Arizona State Route 373 =

State highway in Arizona, United States

State Route 373

Route information
- Maintained by ADOT
- Length: 4.46 mi (7.18 km)
- Existed: 1961–present

Major junctions
- South end: CR 1120 in Greer
- North end: SR 260 west of Eagar

Location
- Country: United States
- State: Arizona

Highway system
- Arizona State Highway System; Interstate; US; State; Scenic Proposed; Former
| ← SR 366 | → SR 377 |

State Route 373, also known as SR 373, is a state highway in northern Arizona that travels from State Route 260 south to Greer. SR 373 is numbered as such because the adjacent stretch of SR 260 was formerly part of State Route 73.

== Route description ==
SR 373 is a 4.46-mile (7.18 km) highway that connects the town of Greer in eastern Arizona with SR 260 west of Eagar. The southern terminus of the highway is located on Main Street, at the northern terminus of Apache County Road 1120, in Greer. SR 373 generally heads on a northerly course as it leaves Greer, reaching its northern terminus at SR 260.

== History ==
SR 373 was defined in 1961 by the Arizona Department of Transportation (ADOT) with exactly the same routing as it follows today. There have been no realignments of the route since establishment.

== Junction list ==
The entire route is in Apache County.

| Location | mi | km | Destinations | Notes |
|---|---|---|---|---|
| Greer | 4.46 | 7.18 | CR 1120 south (Main Street) | Continuation beyond southern terminus |
| | 0.00 | 0.00 | SR 260 – Show Low, Eagar, Springerville | Northern terminus; former SR 73 |
1.000 mi = 1.609 km; 1.000 km = 0.621 mi
