= Aripine, Arizona =

- Populated place
- Location of Aripine in Arizona
- Coordinates: 34°24′30″N 110°25′51″W
- Country: United States
- State: Arizona
- County: Navajo
- Joppa: 1883
- Elevation: 6,427 ft (1,959 m)
- Time zone: UTC-7 (Mountain (MST))
- Area code: 928
- FIPS code: 04-03165
- GNIS feature ID: 25737

Aripine is a populated place situated in Navajo County, Arizona, United States.

== History ==
Originally named Joppa, it was begun as a Mormon settlement in 1883. The Joppa name was discontinued in 1913, and the location was re-established as Aripine in 1922. The name is derived as a combination of the first three letters of Arizona, and the flora of local forests.

Aripine's population was 60 in 1940.
