= Arizona State Route 261 =

State highway in Arizona, United States

State Route 261
- White Mountain Scenic Road

Route information
- Maintained by ADOT
- Length: 17.92 mi (28.84 km)
- Existed: 1991–present
- Tourist routes: White Mountain Scenic Road
- Restrictions: Closed winters

Major junctions
- South end: SR 273 at Crescent Lake
- North end: SR 260 in Eagar

Location
- Country: United States
- State: Arizona

Highway system
- Arizona State Highway System; Interstate; US; State; Scenic Proposed; Former
| ← SR 260 | → SR 264 |

State Route 261 (SR 261) is a highway in Apache County, Arizona that runs from its junction with SR 260 west of Eagar to its junction with SR 273 north of Big Lake. It winds through the forest but is overall a north–south route.

== Route description ==
The southern terminus of SR 261 is located at a junction with SR 273 north of Big Lake. It heads northeast from this intersection and generally follows this heading for its entire length. There are several portions of the highway that wind through the area to follow the terrain as the highway nears its northern terminus. The highway reaches its northern terminus at a junction with SR 260 within the Eagar city limits. SR 261 travels through sparsely populated areas and does not pass through any cities or towns. It serves primarily as an access road to Big Lake, as well as general access to the White Mountains.

== History ==
To prevent mileposts from being used twice, a portion of the nearby SR 273 was renumbered to SR 261 in August 1991, establishing the state highway.

== Junction list ==
The entire route is in Apache County.

| Location | mi | km | Destinations | Notes |
|---|---|---|---|---|
| | 0.00 | 0.00 | SR 273 – Big Lake, Show Low | Southern terminus |
| Eagar | 17.92 | 28.84 | SR 260 – Show Low, Eagar, Springerville | Northern terminus |
1.000 mi = 1.609 km; 1.000 km = 0.621 mi
