= Arizona State Route 260 =

State highway in Arizona, United States

State Route 260
- SR 260 highlighted in red

Route information
- Maintained by ADOT
- Length: 217.78 mi (350.48 km)
- Existed: 1970–present
- Tourist routes: White Mountain Scenic Road

Major junctions
- West end: SR 89A in Cottonwood
- I-17 in Camp Verde; SR 87 in Payson; SR 277 in Heber-Overgaard; US 60 in Show Low
- East end: US 180 / US 191 in Eagar

Location
- Country: United States
- State: Arizona
- Counties: Yavapai, Coconino, Gila, Navajo, Apache

Highway system
- Arizona State Highway System; Interstate; US; State; Scenic Proposed; Former
← SR 238	→ SR 261

State Route 260, also known as SR 260, is a 217.78-mile (350.48 km) long east–west major state highway in the north-central part of the U.S. state of Arizona. It connects State Route 89A in Cottonwood to U.S. Route 180 and U.S. Route 191 in Eagar. The highway begins in Yavapai County before entering Coconino County and then entering Gila County before reentering Coconino County and then entering Navajo and Apache counties, where the highway ends.

== Route description ==
The western terminus of SR 260 is located at State Route 89A in Cottonwood and heads eastbound along much of the Mogollon Rim, finally ending at its junction with U.S. Route 180 and U.S. Route 191 in Eagar. SR 260 is part of the National Highway System between Show Low and Payson.

Stretches of this highway are known by various names, include Camp Verde Bridgeport Highway, General George Crook Trail, Zane Grey Highway, Camp Verde-Payson Highway, and White Mountain Road / Boulevard. The northernmost stretch between Cottonwood and Camp Verde was originally State Route 279, while the original stretch of road from Payson to Eagar was originally State Route 160.

SR 260 was scheduled in 1995, to be widened and upgraded between Payson and Heber-Overgaard to a four lane divided highway with bridges over wildlife corridors to reduce accidents with deer/elk and other wildlife. The road project has never been completed and is still two lanes over much of the route and is congested at times during holiday weekends with traffic from the Phoenix area to areas along the eastern Rim. Care must be observed due to narrow two lanes and wildlife crossing the road. It is also closed during winter storms.

== History ==
SR 260 was originally designated in 1955 as SR 160 from Payson to Show Low. In 1969, US 160 extended into Arizona so SR 160 was renumbered to SR 260 to avoid confusion. In 1972, it extended east to Eagar, replacing SR 173 and part of SR 73. On December 15, 1989, SR 260 extended west to Cottonwood over SR 279.

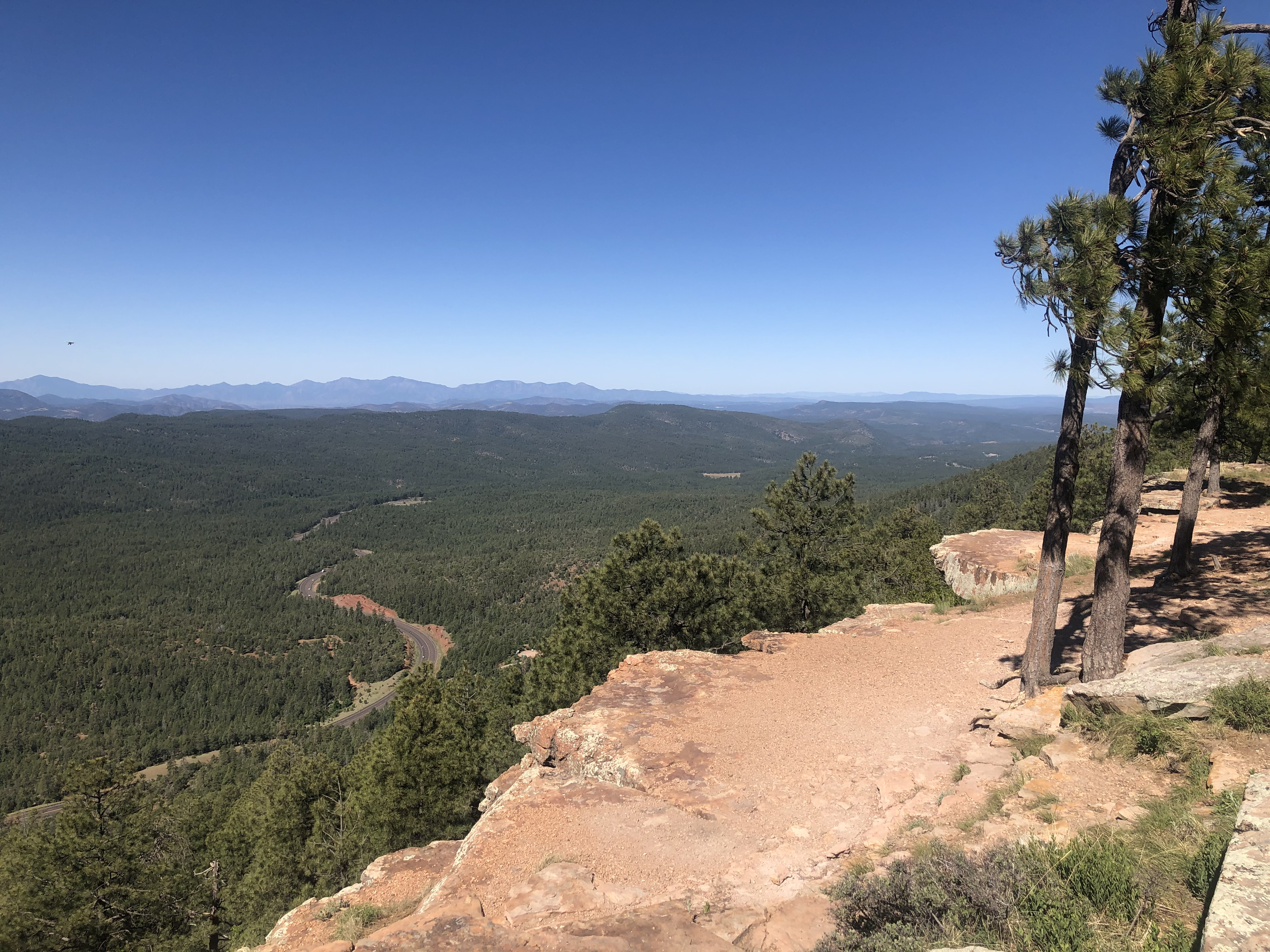
Arizona State Highway 260 winding its way through the Tonto Forest just below the Mogollon Rim.

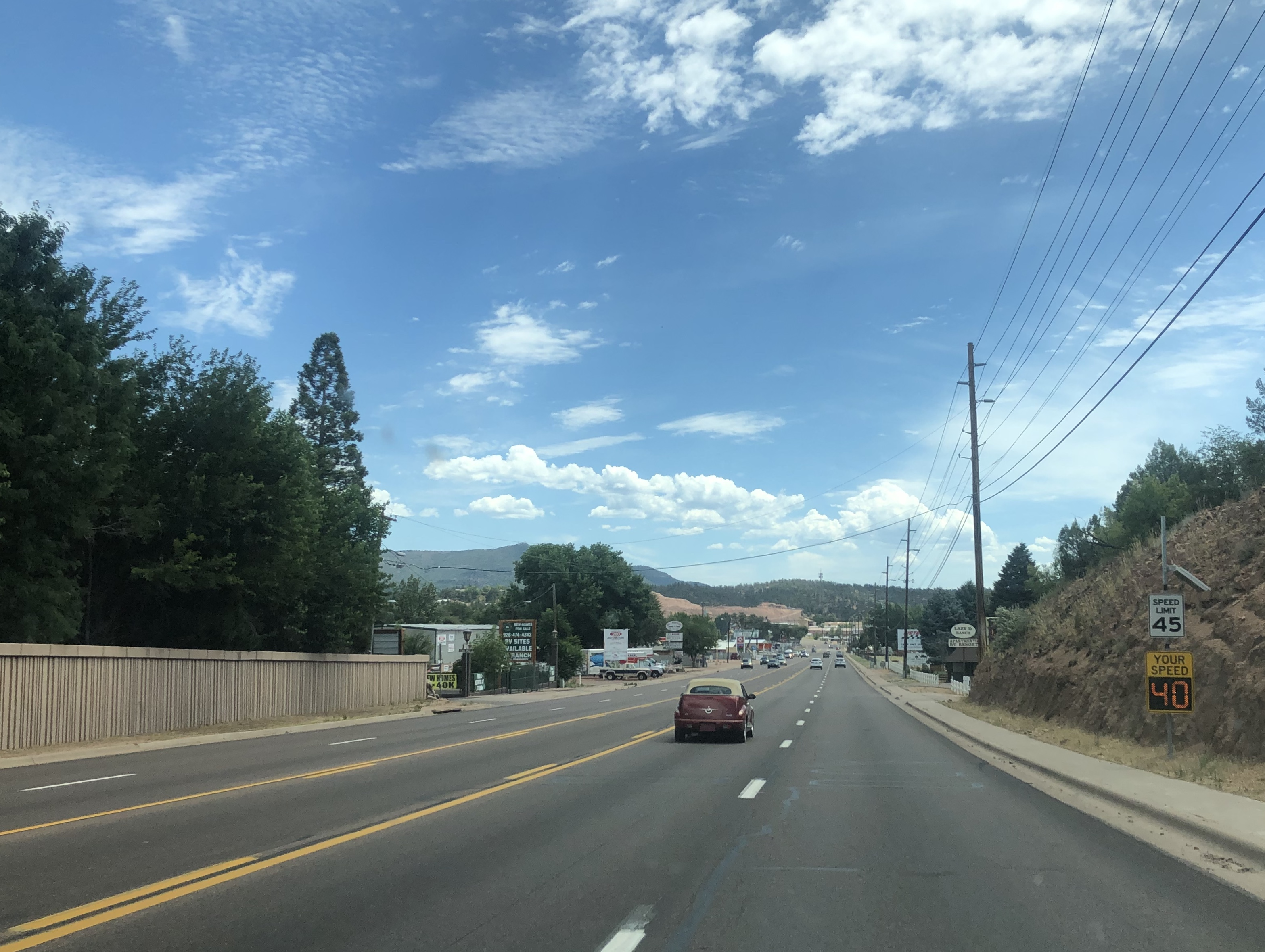
Star Valley is bisected by Highway 260

== Junction list ==
County	Location	mi	km	Destinations	Notes
Yavapai	Cottonwood	0.00	0.00	SR 89A – Clarkdale, Jerome, Sedona	Western terminus; former US 89A; road continues as Cove Parkway
Yavapai	Camp Verde	12.24	19.70	I-17 – Flagstaff, Phoenix	I-17 exit 287
Coconino		46.16	74.29	SR 87 north – Winslow	West end of SR 87 concurrency
Mogollon Rim				Coconino–Gila county line	
Gila	Payson	71.62	115.26	SR 87 south – Mesa, Phoenix	East end of SR 87 concurrency
Mogollon Rim				Gila–Coconino county line	
Coconino		103.18	166.05	Desert to Tall Pines Scenic Road (Young Road)	To SR 288
Navajo	Heber-Overgaard	124.62	200.56	SR 277 north to I-40 / SR 377 – Snowflake, Holbrook	
Navajo	Show Low	159.03	255.93	US 60 west / SR 77 south (Deuce of Clubs west) – Globe	West end of US 60/SR 77 concurrency
Navajo	Show Low	161.00	259.10	US 60 east / SR 77 north (Deuce of Clubs east) – Springerville	East end of US 60/SR 77 concurrency; serves Show Low Regional Airport
Navajo	Indian Pine	176.74	284.44	SR 73 south – Whiteriver	
Apache		187.88	302.36	SR 473 south (Hawley Lake Road) – Hawley Lake	
Apache		196.73	316.61	SR 273 south – Big Lake	
Apache		204.89	329.74	SR 373 south – Greer	
Apache	Eagar	212.34	341.73	SR 261 south – Big Lake	SR 261 closed winters
Apache	Eagar	217.78	350.48	US 180 / US 191 – Alpine, Springerville	Eastern terminus
1.000 mi = 1.609 km; 1.000 km = 0.621 mi: Concurrency terminus
