= Arizona State Route 74 =

Highway in Arizona

State Route 74
- Carefree Highway
- SR 74 highlighted in red

Route information
- Maintained by ADOT
- Length: 30.40 mi (48.92 km)
- Existed: 1964–present

Major junctions
- West end: US 60 near Morristown
- East end: I-17 in Phoenix

Location
- Country: United States
- State: Arizona
- Counties: Maricopa

Highway system
- Arizona State Highway System; Interstate; US; State; Scenic Proposed; Former
← SR 74	→ SR 75

Arizona State Route 74 (SR 74), locally known as the Carefree Highway, is a state highway in central Arizona that stretches east to west from its junction with U.S. Route 60 (US 60) just south of Wickenburg to its junction with Interstate 17 (I-17) in North Phoenix. It serves Lake Pleasant Regional Park and serves as a northern bypass around the often congested stretches of US 60 through the northwest suburbs of the Phoenix metropolitan area. From end to end, it is 30.4 miles (48.9 km) long.

The Carefree Highway is the inspiration for the 1974 Gordon Lightfoot song of the same name.

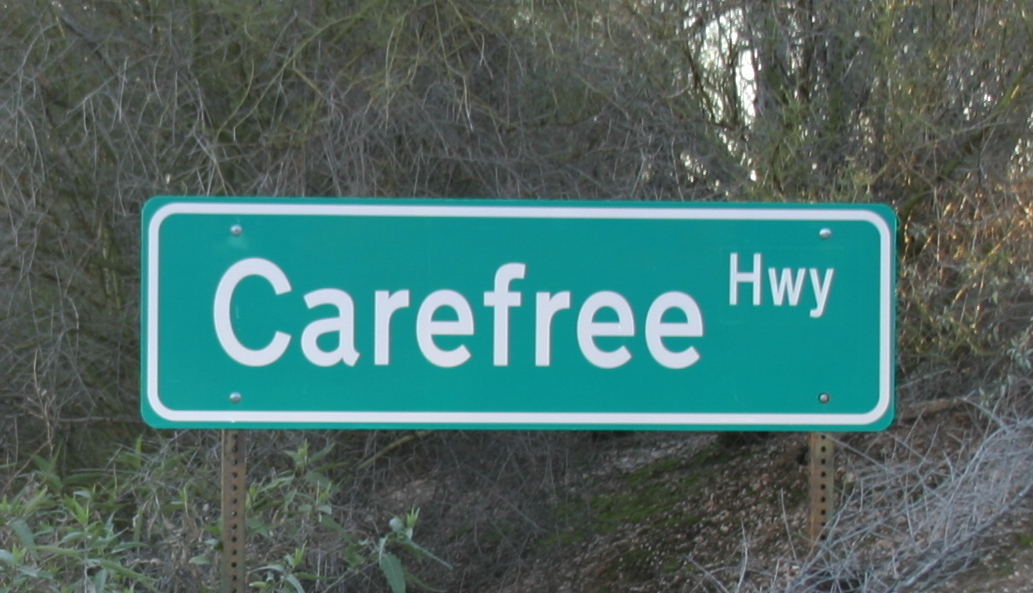
Arizona State Route 74, also known as Carefree Highway

== Route description ==
Stretches of the highway are known as the Morristown–New River Highway, Lake Pleasant Highway, and Carefree Highway, the last of which actually extends 12 miles (19 km) past I-17 to Tom Darlington Drive in Carefree. This stretch of Carefree Highway is sometimes numbered as SR 74 on maps, but is not actually part of the state highway system.

This route offers good views of undeveloped desert landscapes, especially of large saguaro and other desert plants. It is frequently used as an alternate route to US 60 (Grand Avenue) between Phoenix and Wickenburg for motorists traveling to and from Las Vegas, Nevada, with fewer traffic signals than using US 60 directly.

== History ==
From 1927 to 1931, SR 74 was assigned from Wickenburg west to Ehrenberg; this stretch of highway was renumbered as part of U.S. Route 60 (US 60). On December 15, 1961, SR 74 was assigned to a new planned alignment, to be built from New River southwest to Morristown. The leg east of Lake Pleasant Regional Park was originally planned to angle northeast away from its current alignment towards New River. But by 1974, the highway heading eastbound abruptly ended southeast of Lake Pleasant, at Lake Pleasant Road and the Carefree Highway; that same year, Carefree Highway between SR 74 and I-17 was designated SR 74T (Temporary 74). On October 18, 1989, the "Temporary" banner was officially removed from the Carefree Highway leg.

== Future ==
The passage of a sales tax extension by voters in Maricopa County in both 2004 and 2025 provided significant funding for highway improvements throughout the region. The Arizona Department of Transportation (ADOT) will use a portion of that funding to acquire right-of-way along SR 74 for future improvements, but has no plans to upgrade the highway to a controlled access freeway.

ADOT is also in the planning stages for a bypass around Wickenburg. This bypass would effectively continue SR 74 beyond its current western terminus with US 60 to connect to the planned alignment of future I-11. Whether this bypass would be marked as SR 74 or not is undetermined. This extension would likely be constructed at/around the same time as I-11.

== Major intersections ==
The entire route is in Maricopa County.

Location	mi	km	Destinations	Notes
Morristown	0.00	0.00	US 60 – Phoenix, Wickenburg	Western terminus
Phoenix	30.40	48.92	I-17 – Flagstaff, Phoenix	Eastern terminus, exit 223 on I-17; continues east as Carefree Highway
1.000 mi = 1.609 km; 1.000 km = 0.621 mi
