= Arizona State Route 73 =

State highway in Arizona, United States

State Route 73
- SR highlighted in red

Route information
- Maintained by ADOT
- Length: 46.79 mi (75.30 km)
- Existed: September 9, 1927–present
- Tourist routes: White River Scenic Road

Major junctions
- South end: US 60 east of Carrizo
- North end: SR 260 south of Pinetop-Lakeside

Location
- Country: United States
- State: Arizona
- Counties: Navajo, Gila

Highway system
- Arizona State Highway System; Interstate; US; State; Scenic Proposed; Former
| ← SR 72 | → SR 74 |

State Route 73, also known as SR 73, is a U-shaped state highway, though it is signed north–south, primarily serving the Fort Apache Indian Reservation in eastern Arizona. SR 73 begins at a junction with the U.S. Route 60 / State Route 77 concurrency near Carrizo, travels southeast to Fort Apache and Whiteriver, then bends north-northeast until intersecting State Route 260 near the Hon-Dah Resort Casino.

Apart from its termini, the current SR 73 intersects no other US or state routes.

== Route description ==
The clockwise (southern) terminus of SR 73 is located at a junction with US 60 southwest of Show Low. From this intersection, the highway heads southeast within the Fort Apache Indian Reservation. It passes through Cedar Creek and curves towards the east before passing through Canyon Day. Continuing towards the east, it reaches Fort Apache, where it turns towards the northeast. It continues to the northeast on to Whiteriver, where it begins to head towards more of a northerly direction. It continues north through the Fort Apache Indian Reservation until it reaches its counterclockwise (northern) terminus at a junction with SR 260 east of McNary.

== History ==
SR 73 was designated on September 9, 1927 as one of the original state routes, running from US 180 in San Carlos (then known as Rice) to a junction with a county road at McNary. In 1929, it was extended northeast along existing county roads to U.S. Route 70 (US 70, now US 60) at Springerville. At the same time, SR 73 was extended southwest from Rice to Cutter, taking over the old route of US 180 between Rice and Cutter. This was due to US 180 being re-routed to the southwest, over the Coolidge Dam. By 1939, SR 73 had been removed between Cutter and McNary, after being bypassed and replaced by the newly completed US 60 between Springerville and Globe, via Show Low. In 1972, portions were transferred to SR 260.

== Junction list ==
| County | Location | mi | km | Destinations | Notes |
|---|---|---|---|---|---|
| Navajo | | 0.00 | 0.00 | US 60 / SR 77 – Globe, Show Low | Clockwise terminus |
| Gila | No major junctions | | | | |
| Navajo | | 46.79 | 75.30 | SR 260 – Pinetop-Lakeside, Show Low, Eagar, Springerville | Counterclockwise terminus; access to Sunrise Ambulatory Surgical Center; SR 260 east is former SR 73 east, SR 260 west is former SR 173 |
1.000 mi = 1.609 km; 1.000 km = 0.621 mi
