= McNary, Arizona =

CDP in Apache and Navajo Counties, Arizona

- Census-designated place
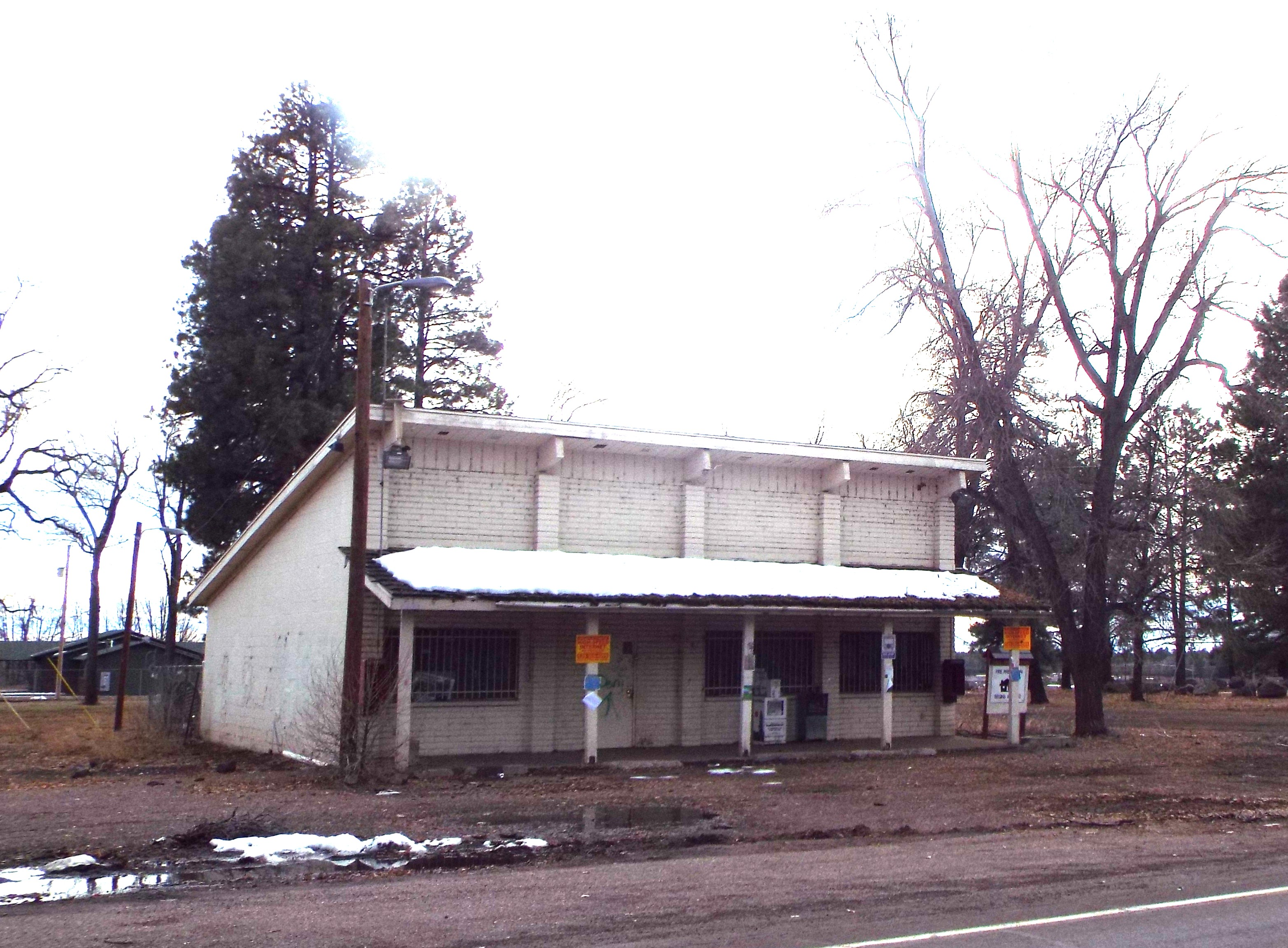
- 1900 McNary General Store

- Location in Apache County and the state of Arizona

- Location in the United States
- Coordinates: 34°05′31″N 109°51′17″W
- Country: United States
- State: Arizona
- Counties: Apache, Navajo

Area
  - Total: 5.75 sq mi (14.88 km^{2})
  - Land: 5.67 sq mi (14.69 km^{2})
  - Water: 0.073 sq mi (0.19 km^{2})
- Elevation: 7,363 ft (2,244 m)

Population (2020)
  - Total: 484
  - Density: 85.3/sq mi (32.94/km^{2})
- Time zone: UTC-7 (MST)
- ZIP code: 85930
- Area code: 928
- FIPS code: 04-43430
- GNIS feature ID: 2408802

McNary (Western Apache: Cha’bii’tú’) is a census-designated place (CDP) in Apache and Navajo counties in the U.S. state of Arizona, on the Fort Apache Indian Reservation. The population was 528 at the 2010 census.

== History ==
The community was originally named "Cluff Cienega" by European Americans after Benjamin Cluff, a Mormon bishop who harvested hay here in 1879 and 1880 for use at Fort Apache. In 1919, the name was changed to "Cooley" in honor of Corydon Cooley (d. March 18, 1917), a hotelier of Show Low. In 1924, the Cady Lumber Company moved its entire operations, plus hundreds of employees, from McNary, Louisiana, to Cooley, Arizona. For marketing purposes, the company received permission from the federal government to rename Cooley as McNary. This company was later renamed Southwest Lumber Mills and then Southwest Forest Industries. The mill closed in 1979 after a fire.

== Geography ==
According to the United States Census Bureau, the CDP has a total area of 5.6 square miles (14.4 km^{2}), of which 5.5 square miles (14.2 km^{2}) is land and 0.077 square miles (0.2 km^{2}), or 1.30%, is water.

At an elevation of 7,316 feet (2,230 m), it is the second highest community in Arizona after Alpine.

=== Climate ===
The climate in this area has mild differences between highs and lows, and there is adequate rainfall year-round. According to the Köppen Climate Classification system, McNary has a marine west coast climate, abbreviated "Cfb" on climate maps. McNary has recorded one of the lowest temperature in the southwestern state of Arizona, as on January 7, 1971, the temperature froze at around −40 °F / −40 °C. McNary averages 65 inches of snow per year and is one of the coldest places in Arizona, along with Hawley Lake, which recorded the same temperature of −40 °F / −40 °C

Climate data for McNary, Arizona (1991–2020 normals, extremes 1933–present)
Month	Jan	Feb	Mar	Apr	May	Jun	Jul	Aug	Sep	Oct	Nov	Dec	Year
Record high °F (°C)	68 (20)	72 (22)	74 (23)	80 (27)	89 (32)	98 (37)	98 (37)	91 (33)	89 (32)	88 (31)	79 (26)	73 (23)	98 (37)
Mean maximum °F (°C)	56.0 (13.3)	59.5 (15.3)	65.8 (18.8)	72.8 (22.7)	80.5 (26.9)	88.7 (31.5)	89.6 (32.0)	84.5 (29.2)	80.5 (26.9)	75.8 (24.3)	67.1 (19.5)	58.5 (14.7)	91.1 (32.8)
Mean daily maximum °F (°C)	44.7 (7.1)	47.3 (8.5)	53.2 (11.8)	59.5 (15.3)	68.9 (20.5)	79.9 (26.6)	80.0 (26.7)	76.9 (24.9)	72.9 (22.7)	64.4 (18.0)	54.1 (12.3)	44.5 (6.9)	62.2 (16.8)
Daily mean °F (°C)	32.6 (0.3)	35.0 (1.7)	40.1 (4.5)	44.8 (7.1)	53.3 (11.8)	63.2 (17.3)	66.0 (18.9)	64.3 (17.9)	59.5 (15.3)	50.3 (10.2)	40.9 (4.9)	32.8 (0.4)	48.6 (9.2)
Mean daily minimum °F (°C)	20.6 (−6.3)	22.7 (−5.2)	27.0 (−2.8)	30.1 (−1.1)	37.7 (3.2)	46.5 (8.1)	52.0 (11.1)	51.6 (10.9)	46.1 (7.8)	36.2 (2.3)	27.7 (−2.4)	21.0 (−6.1)	34.9 (1.6)
Mean minimum °F (°C)	4.5 (−15.3)	8.1 (−13.3)	13.2 (−10.4)	19.4 (−7.0)	26.7 (−2.9)	37.4 (3.0)	46.8 (8.2)	47.1 (8.4)	36.8 (2.7)	23.5 (−4.7)	12.0 (−11.1)	3.9 (−15.6)	1.1 (−17.2)
Record low °F (°C)	−23 (−31)	−18 (−28)	−13 (−25)	0 (−18)	8 (−13)	20 (−7)	30 (−1)	32 (0)	21 (−6)	6 (−14)	−5 (−21)	−18 (−28)	−23 (−31)
Average precipitation inches (mm)	2.11 (54)	1.96 (50)	1.83 (46)	0.91 (23)	0.70 (18)	0.53 (13)	3.72 (94)	4.60 (117)	2.22 (56)	1.71 (43)	1.56 (40)	2.26 (57)	24.11 (612)
Average snowfall inches (cm)	14.8 (38)	13.9 (35)	11.9 (30)	4.7 (12)	0.6 (1.5)	0.0 (0.0)	0.0 (0.0)	0.0 (0.0)	0.0 (0.0)	2.1 (5.3)	5.2 (13)	12.8 (33)	66.0 (168)
Average precipitation days (≥ 0.01 inch)	7.9	7.4	7.7	5.0	4.6	3.5	15.2	16.7	9.8	5.9	5.2	7.7	96.6
Average snowy days (≥ 0.1 inch)	6.1	6.0	5.0	2.6	0.6	0.0	0.0	0.0	0.0	0.8	2.4	6.0	29.5
Source: National Oceanic and Atmospheric Administration

== Demographics ==
Historical population
Census	Pop.	Note	%±
2000	349		—
2010	528		51.3%
2020	484		−8.3%
U.S. Decennial Census

As of the census of 2000, there were 349 people, 91 households, and 73 families residing in the CDP. The population density was 63.5 inhabitants per square mile (24.5/km^{2}). There were 101 housing units at an average density of 18.4 per square mile (7.1/km^{2}). The racial makeup of the CDP was 82.8% Native American, 8.3% White, 2.6% Black or African American, 2.9% from other races, and 3.4% from two or more races. 11.2% of the population were Hispanic or Latino of any race.

There were 91 households, out of which 63.7% had children under the age of 18 living with them, 44.0% were married couples living together, 31.9% had a female householder with no husband present, and 18.7% were non-families. 16.5% of all households were made up of individuals, and 1.1% had someone living alone who was 65 years of age or older. The average household size was 3.84 and the average family size was 4.18.

In the CDP, the age distribution of the population shows 48.7% under the age of 18, 7.4% from 18 to 24, 30.7% from 25 to 44, 9.5% from 45 to 64, and 3.7% who were 65 years of age or older. The median age was 19 years. For every 100 females, there were 87.6 males. For every 100 females age 18 and over, there were 86.5 males.

The median income for a household in the CDP was $4,375. Males had a median income of $36,875 versus $18,375 for females. The per capita income for the CDP was $2,917. About 78.9% of families and 86.4% of the population were below the poverty line, including 96.6% of those under age 18 and 100% of those age 65 or over.

== Education ==
McNary is served by the McNary Elementary School District, and by the Blue Ridge Junior High School, and Blue Ridge High School in nearby Pinetop-Lakeside. and Alchesay High School which is part of Whiteriver Unified School District.

== Infrastructure ==
=== Transportation ===
The White Mountain Apache Tribe operates the Fort Apache Connection Transit, which provides local bus service.

== See also ==
- Fort Apache Indian Reservation
