= Hawley Lake =

Lake in Arizona, United States

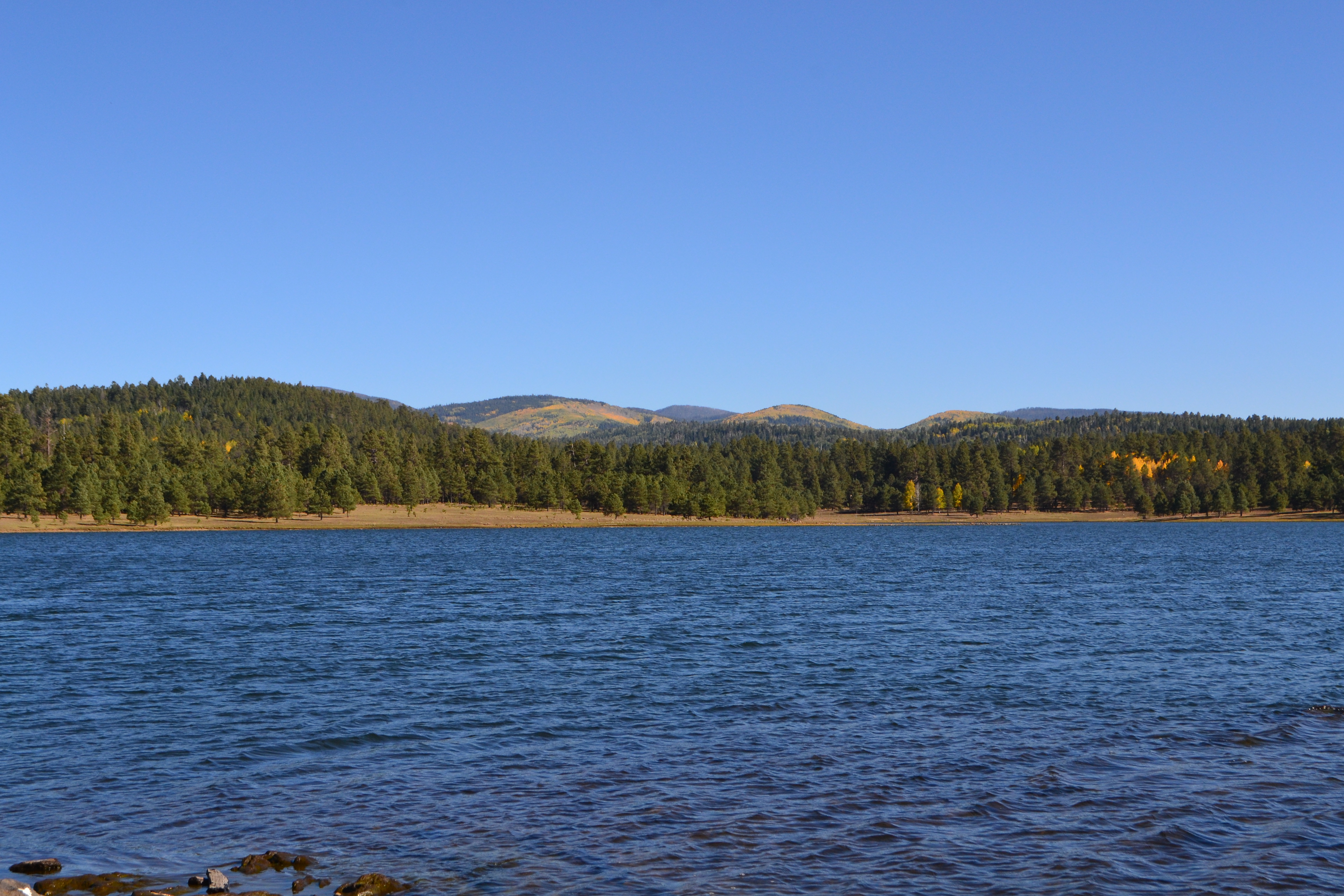
- A view of Hawley Lake

- Location within Arizona Location within the United States
- Location: Fort Apache Indian Reservation, Apache County, Arizona, United States
- Coordinates: 33°59′36″N 109°45′31″W
- Basin countries: United States
- Surface area: 300 acres (120 ha)
- Surface elevation: 8,200 ft (2,500 m)

Hawley Lake is an American 300-acre (120 ha) lake and place in east-central Arizona, in the White Mountain Apache Indian Reservation, and has an elevation of 8,200 feet (2,500 m).

The lake is a remnant of Pliocene volcanism on the Mogollon Rim but it has been artificially extended as a reservoir for downstream irrigation plus trout and ice fishing (though a tribal licence is required to fish on the reservation). The camphost Bill Kee has been part of this recreation facility for nearly 25 years. Its popularity as a recreational area is enhanced by a nearby ski resort.

== Climate ==
Owing to its high elevation, Hawley Lake has a humid continental climate (Köppen Dsb) and stands as one of the coldest and wettest places in Arizona. In March 1973 snowfall was as high as 105 inches (2.7 m). Rainfall from July to September is also high, though not exceptional compared to many parts of southeastern Arizona. Hawley Lake holds the all-time record low temperature in Arizona history with −40 °F/°C recorded on January 7, 1971. It also holds the record for most precipitation in a calendar year in Arizona with 58.92 inches (1,496.6 mm) in 1978 – much of that being snow.

Climate data for Hawley Lake, Arizona (1967-1988)
Month	Jan	Feb	Mar	Apr	May	Jun	Jul	Aug	Sep	Oct	Nov	Dec	Year
Record high °F (°C)	63 (17)	65 (18)	67 (19)	71 (22)	86 (30)	88 (31)	88 (31)	84 (29)	79 (26)	75 (24)	69 (21)	64 (18)	88 (31)
Mean daily maximum °F (°C)	41.7 (5.4)	43.1 (6.2)	45.1 (7.3)	52.3 (11.3)	61.9 (16.6)	73.1 (22.8)	74.8 (23.8)	72.0 (22.2)	67.4 (19.7)	58.6 (14.8)	48.9 (9.4)	42.8 (6.0)	56.8 (13.8)
Daily mean °F (°C)	24.3 (−4.3)	26.0 (−3.3)	29.8 (−1.2)	37.1 (2.8)	45.6 (7.6)	54.4 (12.4)	59.2 (15.1)	57.5 (14.2)	52.4 (11.3)	43.0 (6.1)	33.5 (0.8)	26.2 (−3.2)	40.7 (4.8)
Mean daily minimum °F (°C)	6.8 (−14.0)	8.8 (−12.9)	14.4 (−9.8)	21.8 (−5.7)	29.3 (−1.5)	35.6 (2.0)	43.6 (6.4)	42.9 (6.1)	37.3 (2.9)	27.3 (−2.6)	18.1 (−7.7)	9.6 (−12.4)	24.6 (−4.1)
Record low °F (°C)	−40 (−40)	−20 (−29)	−18 (−28)	−16 (−27)	6 (−14)	19 (−7)	29 (−2)	26 (−3)	21 (−6)	3 (−16)	−11 (−24)	−27 (−33)	−40 (−40)
Average precipitation inches (mm)	3.64 (92)	3.29 (84)	5.07 (129)	1.97 (50)	1.26 (32)	1.05 (27)	4.83 (123)	5.18 (132)	3.30 (84)	2.93 (74)	2.58 (66)	3.08 (78)	38.18 (971)
Average snowfall inches (cm)	30.4 (77)	29.1 (74)	41.8 (106)	18.4 (47)	2.7 (6.9)	trace	0 (0)	0 (0)	0 (0)	3.2 (8.1)	15.5 (39)	27.0 (69)	168.2 (427)
Average precipitation days (≥ 0.01 inch)	8	7	9	5	4	5	15	18	10	6	5	7	99
Average snowy days (≥ 0.1 inch)	2.2	2.3	2.1	1.0	0.1	0	0	0	0	0.6	1.4	1.9	11.6
Source: WRCC

== Gallery ==
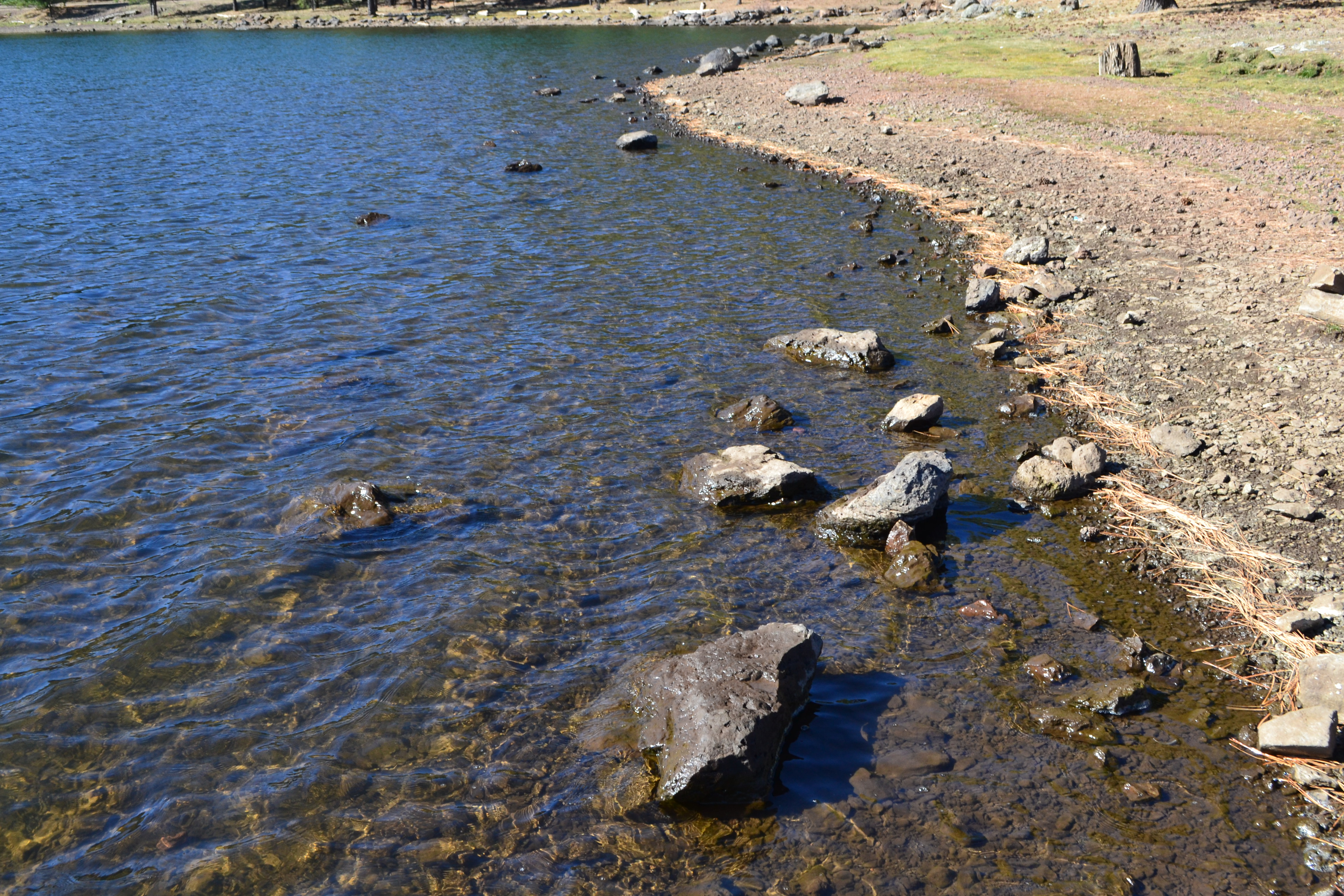
The shoreline

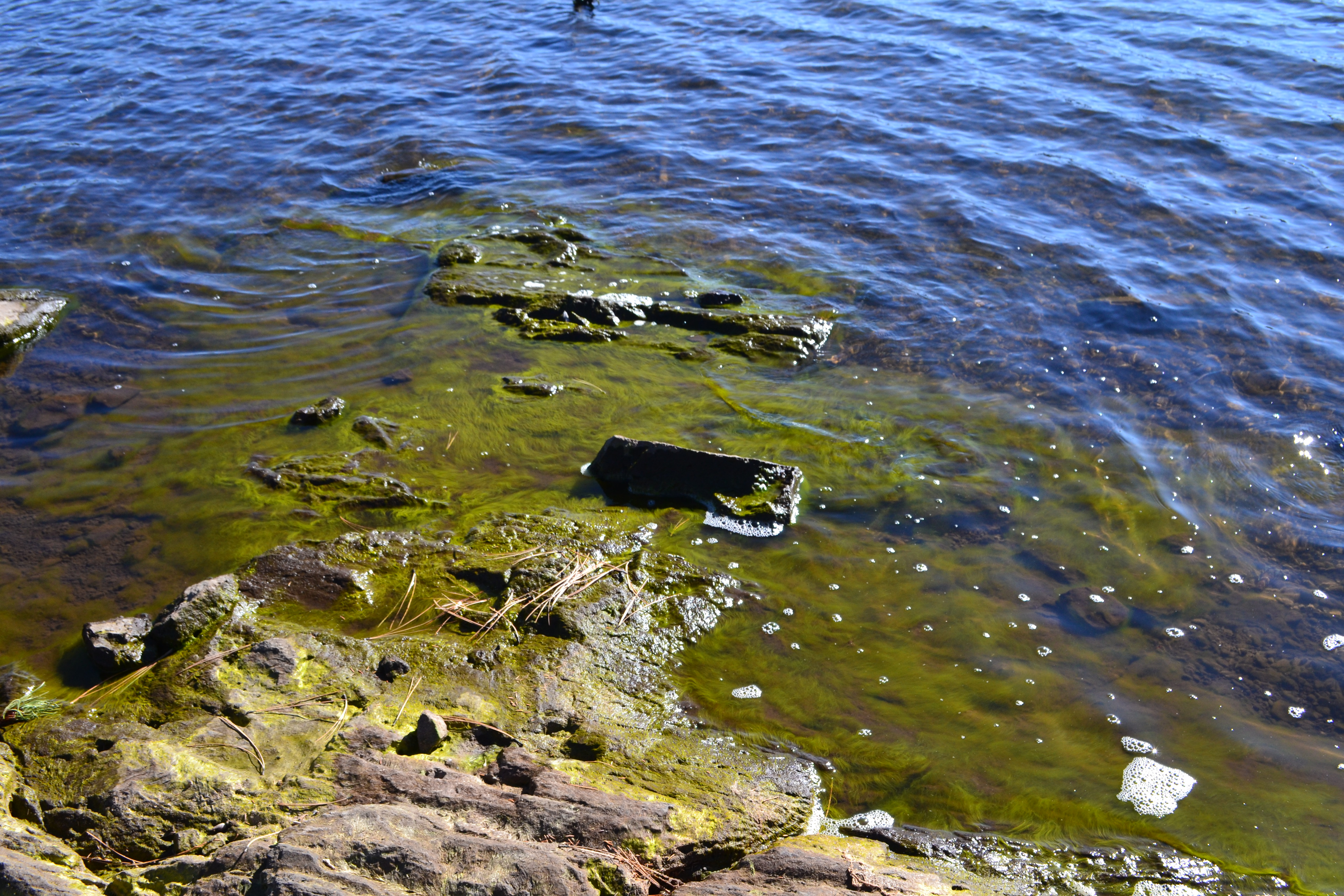
Algae in the lake

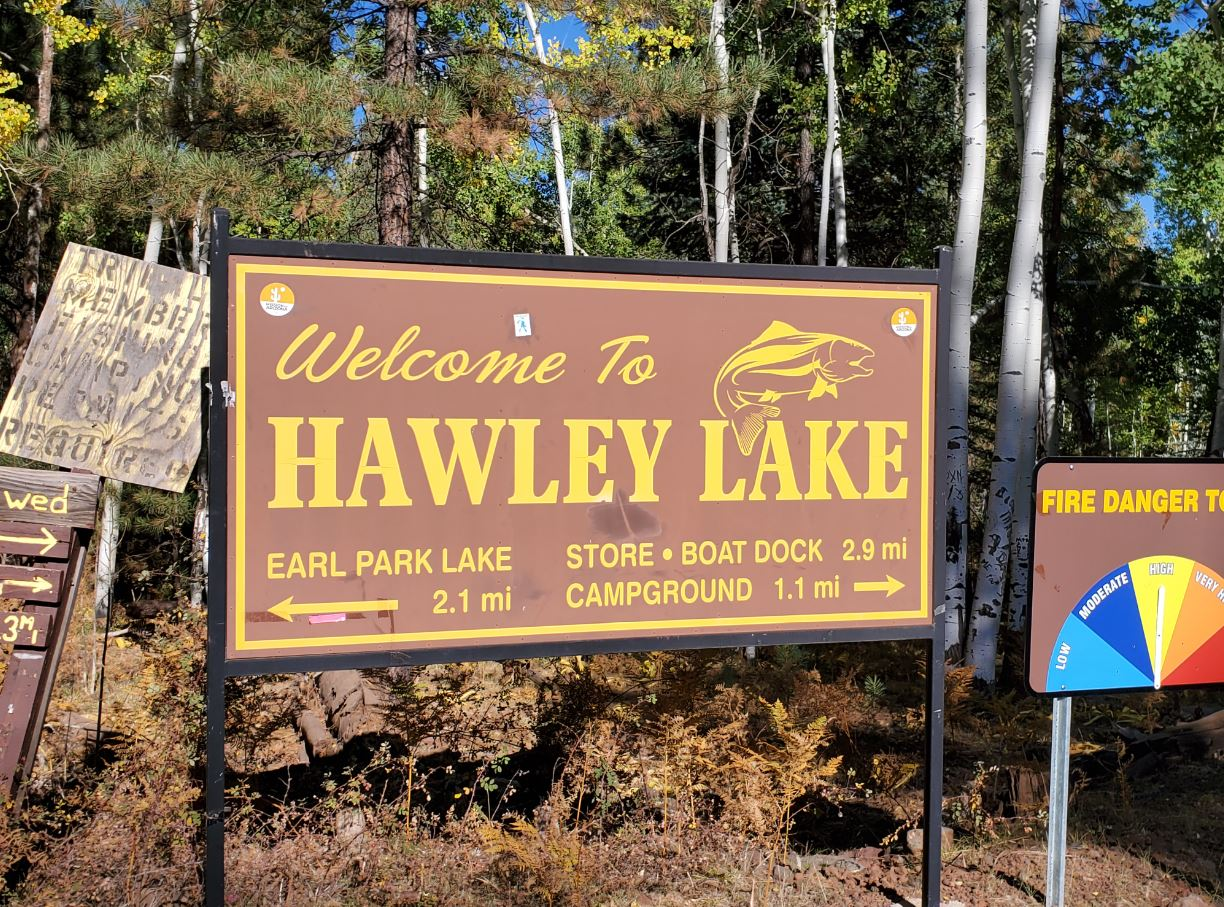
The entrance sign at Hawley Lake
