= Former state routes in Arizona =

Obsolete highway numbers in the US

Former State Routes of the Arizona State Highway System
- Example signage from the Arizona State Highway System
- Formed: September 9, 1927

Highway names
- Interstates: Interstate X (I-X)
- US Highways: U.S. Route X (US X)
- State: State Route X (SR X)

System links
- Arizona State Highway System; Interstate; US; State; Scenic Proposed; Former

Below is a list and summary of the former state routes in Arizona, including mileage tables and maps. Between the establishment of Arizona's numbered state highway system in 1927 and the present date, several state routes have been decommissioned. Some state routes were retired as a result of the state relinquishing ownership to local authorities, while others were made extensions of or redesignated as other highways, with some former state routes being upgraded to U.S. Highway or Interstate status.

== State Route 62 ==
State Route 62
- Chloride Spur
- Location: Grasshopper Junction to Chloride
- Length: 3.79 mi (6.10 km)
- Existed: 1936–1971

A map of SR 62, highlighted in red.

State Route 62 (SR 62) was a state highway in northwestern Arizona running a total of 3.50 miles (5.63 kilometres) from US 93 and US 466, north of Kingman to the mining town of Chloride. SR 62 was designated on May 5, 1936, coinciding with the extension of US 466 and US 93 across the Hoover Dam into Arizona. Despite the separate State Route designation from US 93/US 466, the Arizona State Highway Department considered SR 62 to be the "Chloride Spur" of both U.S. Highways. It was deleted from the state highway system on July 23, 1971 because of the closure of the mine in Chloride. The road is still in use today as Mohave County Road 125.

Major intersections

The entire route was in Mohave County.

Location	mi	km	Destinations	Notes
Grasshopper Junction	0.00	0.00	US 93 / US 466 – Las Vegas, Kingman	Western terminus; milepost 52.74
Chloride	3.79	6.10	Tennessee Avenue	Continuation beyond eastern terminus; milepost 56.53
1.000 mi = 1.609 km; 1.000 km = 0.621 mi

Browse numbered routes
← SR 61	SR 62	→ SR 63

== State Route 63 (1932–1951) ==
State Route 63
- Location: Petrified Forest National Park
- Length: 22.80 mi (36.69 km)
- Existed: 1932–1951

A map of SR 63, highlighted in red.

State Route 63 (SR 63), was a 22.80-mile (37-kilometre) long state highway in northeastern Arizona. The route was designated on May 18, 1932, running through the Petrified Forest National Park east of Winslow between U.S. Route 66 and U.S. Route 180. The road was decertified on September 7, 1951 and is now maintained by the National Park Service.

Major intersections

The entire route was in Petrified Forest National Park.

County	mi	km	Destinations	Notes
Navajo	0.00	0.00	US 180 – Holbrook, Springerville	Southern terminus
Apache	22.80	36.69	US 66 – Flagstaff, Albuquerque	Northern terminus
1.000 mi = 1.609 km; 1.000 km = 0.621 mi

Browse numbered routes
← SR 62	SR 63 (1932–1951)	→ SR 63

== State Route 63 (1961–1981) ==
State Route 63
- Location: Sanders to US 160
- Length: 136.64 mi (219.90 km)
- Existed: 1961–1981

State Route 63 (SR 63) was a 136.64-mile (220-kilometre) long state highway in northeastern Arizona servicing the Navajo Nation. SR 63 was designated on January 10, 1961, along a route from U.S. Route 66 (US 66) in Chambers to the reservation boundary of the Navajo Nation. On December 14, 1962, SR 63 was extended north of the reservation boundary to SR 264 in Ganado. On June 15, 1970, the route was further extended north over Navajo Route 8 and Navajo Route 17 to US 164, which became part of US 160 later that year. SR 63 was decommissioned on May 11, 1981, when the route became part of US 191.

== State Route 65 ==
State Route 65
- Location: Strawberry Junction to Second Mesa
- Length: 139.06 mi (223.80 km)
- Existed: 1936–1967

A map of SR 65, highlighted in red.

State Route 65 (SR 65) was a 139.06-mile (224-kilometre) long state highway between State Route 87 (SR 87) at Strawberry Junction and SR 264 in Second Mesa, located in northern Arizona. The route was designated on May 19, 1936, going between US 66 in Winslow and the Coconino National Forest boundary. On September 9, 1960, it extended to SR 264 in Second Mesa. On June 10, 1966, SR 65 was extended through the Coconino National Forest, replacing Forest Route 10 to SR 87 at Strawberry Junction, north of Payson. This road became part of SR 87 on July 25, 1967 when the last section of paving was completed on SR 65.

Major intersections

County	Location	mi	km	Destinations	Notes
Coconino	Strawberry Junction	0.00	0.00	SR 87 south / General Crook Trail – Payson, Mesa	Southern terminus of SR 65; northern terminus of SR 87; milepost 270.70
Navajo	Winslow	69.30	111.53	US 66 west (2nd Street/3rd Street) – Flagstaff	Southern end of US 66 concurrency; milepost 339.77
Navajo	Winslow	73.10	117.64	US 66 east – Holbrook	Northern end of US 66 concurrency; milepost 343.57
Navajo	Second Mesa	139.06	223.80	SR 264 – Tuba City, Ganado	Northern terminus; milepost 406.00
1.000 mi = 1.609 km; 1.000 km = 0.621 mi: Concurrency terminus

Browse numbered routes
← SR 64	SR 65	→ US 66

== State Route 69T ==
State Route 69T
- Baseline Road
- Location: Tempe to Mesa
- Length: 3.02 mi (4.86 km)
- Existed: 1955–1979

A map of SR 69T, final alignment highlighted in red, original extent highlighted in transparent red.

State Route 69T or State Route 69 Temporary (SR 69T) was a 3.02-mile (4.86-kilometre) long temporary state route in the Phoenix metropolitan area of Arizona. SR 69T was originally designated on January 10, 1955, running from McDowell Road and Grand Avenue (US 60, US 70 and US 89) south on 19th Avenue past a junction with US 80 at Buckeye Road, then proceeding east on Baseline Road to SR 87 and SR 93 at Country Club Drive in Mesa. The primary purpose for the existence of SR 69T was to serve as a detour and temporary corridor for future I-17 and I-10 traffic between Grand Avenue and Baseline Road, while both Interstates were under construction. Although SR 69T never touched its parent route, SR 69, the latter route used to run immediately parallel with or close to part of SR 69T, with the two routes being connected via Grand Avenue or Buckeye Road.

In 1957, the Black Canyon Freeway, a section of I-17 that had previously run from Durango Street to McDowell Road, was extended north along SR 69 on 23rd Avenue to a new interchange with Grand Avenue. Following the opening of I-17 between Grand Avenue and McDowell Road, SR 69T was truncated south to end at US 80 (Buckeye Road) on June 17, 1957. On March 12, 1963, SR 69T was further truncated in the west from US 80 to 16th Street and Baseline Road, then extended north along 16th Street to connect with I-10 at 16th Street. The newly constructed section of I-10 from I-17 at Durango Street to 16th Street, known as the Maricopa Freeway, effectively replaced the need for SR 69T between US 80 and 16th Street.

By 1965, construction had begun on I-10 east of 16th Street towards Baseline Road. Another section of I-10 was completed south of SR 69T (Baseline Road) in Tempe between 1967 and 1968. I-10 was completed between 16th Street and Baseline Road with the opening of the Broadway Curve in 1968. Between 1965 and 1970, SR 69T was truncated and rerouted to begin at 40th Street and I-10, following 40th Street south to Baseline Road. On July 17, 1970, SR 69T was decommissioned west of I-10 and Baseline Road in Tempe, completely removing the designation from Phoenix. In 1976, SR 69T was truncated to its final western terminus at Price Road and Baseline Road. The remainder of SR 69T was decommissioned from Price Road to SR 87/SR 93 on August 13, 1979.

Major intersections

The entire route was in Maricopa County.

Location	mi	km	Destinations	Notes
Mesa	0.00	0.00	SR 87 / SR 93 (South Country Club Drive) – Payson, Glendale, Coolidge, Casa Grande	Southern terminus; milepost 171.57
Tempe	3.02	4.86	South Price Road / East Baseline Road	Northern terminus; milepost 174.59; road continues west as Baseline Road; former SR 69T north
1.000 mi = 1.609 km; 1.000 km = 0.621 mi: Route transition

Browse numbered routes
← SR 69	SR 69T	→ US 70

== State Route 74 (1927-1931) ==
State Route 74
- Location: Ehrenberg to Wickenburg
- Length: 111.20 mi (178.96 km)
- Existed: 1927–1931

State Route 74 (SR 74) was a 111.20-mile (178.96-kilometre) state highway in Arizona. SR 74 was originally commissioned on September 9, 1927, as one of the original state highways, originally starting at the Colorado River in Ehrenberg and ending halfway between Ehrenberg and Wickenburg near Love. By 1928, the highway had been extended east to US 89 in Wickenburg. At this time, SR 74 was entirely an ungraded dirt road. A small section of SR 74 from Ehrenberg traveling a few miles east had been graded and given an improved surface by 1929. The road was graded between Wickenburg and a point immediately west of Salome by 1930. On June 13, 1931, SR 74 was decommissioned after becoming part of an extension of US 60 to Los Angeles, California. The designation was later re-used when the current SR 74 was designated in 1962.

Major intersections

County	Location	mi	km	Destinations	Notes
Yuma	Ehrenberg	0.00	0.00	Unspecified county road – Los Angeles	Western terminus; road continued into California; now I-10 west
Yuma	Ehrenberg	0.00	0.00	Bridge over the Colorado River	
Yuma	Hope	50.40	81.11	SR 72 west – Parker	Eastern terminus of SR 72
Maricopa	Wickenburg	111.20	178.96	US 89 – Prescott, Phoenix	Eastern terminus; US 89 is now US 93 north and US 60 east
1.000 mi = 1.609 km; 1.000 km = 0.621 mi: Route transition

Browse numbered routes
← SR 73	SR 74 (1927–1931)	→ SR 74

== State Route 76 ==
State Route 76
- Location: Cochise and Pinal counties
- Length: 11.16 mi (17.96 km)
- Existed: 1962–1988

State Route 76 (SR 76) consisted of two discontinuous sections of highway between Benson and SR 77, both of which gave SR 76 a total length of 11.16 miles (17.96 km). The highway was originally established between the San Manuel Copper Mine and the adjoining town of San Manuel, on December 28, 1962. A small segment of Pomerene Road near Benson was later added to SR 76, creating the discontinuous gap. This was part of a proposed extension of the highway from San Manuel to Benson. This extension was originally to be designated as SR 176, before it was changed into an extension of SR 76. Construction had also begun on the extension south of San Manuel, but was ultimately never completed, with the last constructed segment being abandoned halfway through construction, never being paved or open to traffic. However, one part of this extension is open and currently serves as a link from San Manuel to San Pedro River Road. The section of highway between SR 77 and the copper mine was decommissioned in 1974. On December 16, 1988, SR 76 was entirely decommissioned as a state highway, with any land and right of way acquired for the incomplete Benson extension also being sold off.

== State Route 79 (1927–1941) ==
State Route 79
- Location: Prescott to Flagstaff
- Length: 85.30 mi (137.28 km)
- Existed: 1927–1940

State Route 79 (SR 79) was a 85.30-mile (137.28-kilometre) long state route between Prescott and Flagstaff. The first route to use the SR 79 designation was commissioned on September 9, 1927, as part of the original state highways from U.S. Route 89 (US 89) in Prescott to Jerome. By 1928, it was extended northeast to US 66 Flagstaff. This allowed SR 79 to act as a shorter route between Prescott and Flagstaff for motorists, rather than needing to take US 89 and US 66 on a longer route through Ash Fork. Only a section of the road from Prescott to Cottonwood was graded and had an upaved surfacing, with the remainder being an unimproved dirt road. The entire route was paved by 1939. On June 3, 1940, the American Association of State Highway and Transportation Officials approved a request by the state of Arizona to redesignate the entirety of SR 79 as US 89 Alternate (US 89A). When the highway reverted to a state route in 1993, it kept the 89A designation.

== State Route 79 (1950–1993) ==
State Route 79
- Location: Flagstaff
- Length: 1.51 mi (2.43 km)
- Existed: 1950–1993

A map of SR 79, highlighted in red.

State Route 79 (SR 79) was a 1.51-mile (2-kilometre) long state route located entirely within the city of Flagstaff. SR 79, being the second route to carry the designation in Arizona, was originally designated on May 19, 1950, from Camp Verde to SR 69 at Cordes Junction. In 1955, it was extended to US 89A south of Flagstaff over a county highway as SR 79T. SR 79T was to exist only until the proposed federal aid route between Camp Verde and Flagstaff was completed. In 1962, SR 79's new routing was complete, and part of the temporary routing was abandoned back to county ownership. The remainder of SR 79T was retired in 1964. SR 79 was extended north along US 89A to US 66 and US 89 in 1964.

On April 24, 1970, approval was given to remove the SR 79 designation and signage between Cordes Junction and Interstate 40 (I-40) in Flagstaff, as this section of the route was replaced by or slated to be rebuilt into I-17. However, sections not built to Interstate standards were still marked as SR 79 on the official 1971 state highway map. By 1975, the southern terminus of SR 79 had been truncated to the northern terminus of I-17. Both termini were located at the I-17 interchange with I-40. From 1975 to 1992, SR 79 continued north along the same roadway that had been I-17 to a junction with US 89A. SR 79 then ran entirely concurrent with US 89A from just north of the I-17 and I-40 interchange to US 66 and US 89 (which was later replaced by I-40 Business). The third incarnation of SR 79 was designated on August 21, 1992, while the second SR 79 still existed. The third incarnation was located between SR 77 and US 60, replacing a section of US 89, which had been truncated to Flagstaff. The remainder of the second SR 79 was decommissioned on March 19, 1993.

Major intersections

The entire route was in Flagstaff, Coconino County.

mi	km	Destinations	Notes
0.00	0.00	I-17 south / I-40 – Flagstaff, Phoenix, Los Angeles, Albuquerque	Southern terminus of SR 79; northern terminus of I-17; milepost 340.05
0.35	0.56	US 89A south – Sedona	Partial interchange; south end of US 89A concurrency; milepost 340.40; US 89A milepost 402.37
1.51	2.43	BL 40 / US 89A north (Sitgreaves Street) – Williams, Winslow	Northern terminus of SR 79; north end of US 89A concurrency; US 89A milepost 403.40
1.000 mi = 1.609 km; 1.000 km = 0.621 mi

Browse numbered routes
← SR 79	SR 79 (1950–1993)	→ SR 79

== State Route 81 (1927–1938) ==
State Route 81
- Location: Douglas to Sanders
- Length: 376.30 mi (605.60 km)
- Existed: 1927–1938

State Route 81 (SR 81), was a 376.30-mile (605.60-kilometre) long state highway in eastern Arizona. SR 81 served as one of the original state routes, designated on September 9, 1927. The route was originally a major highway stretching from U.S. Route 80 (US 80) in Douglas to US 180 (later US 70) in Safford.

In 1936, SR 81 was extended north to US 66 in Sanders. Between, Safford and the southern terminus of SR 71 near Solomonsville, SR 81 now shared a concurrency with US 70. SR 71 was decommissioned entirely, being replaced by SR 81 from US 70 to US 60T/SR 73 in Eagar. Starting in Alpine, SR 81 ran concurrently with US 260 to St. Johns. North of Eagar, SR 81 ran concurrently with US 60T to Springerville. SR 81 followed SR 61 north from St. Johns for 30 miles (48 kilometres), then ran alone on a newly designated state highway to US 66 in Sanders.

The entire route was approved as an extension of US 666, which was approved by the American Association of State Highway Officials (AASHTO) on December 4, 1938. As a result, SR 81 was decommissioned, with US 666 becoming the sole designation of the route between Douglas and Sanders. The Arizona portion of US 666 would later be redesignated as an extension of US 191 in June 1992.

Major intersections

County	Location	mi	km	Destinations	Notes
Cochise	Douglas	0.00	0.00	US 80 – Bisbee, Lordsburg	Southern terminus; now SR 80
Cochise	Cochise	64.80	104.29	SR 86 west – Benson	Southern end of SR 86 concurrency; now I-10 west
Cochise	Bowie	92.50	148.86	SR 86 east – Lordsburg	Northern end of SR 86 concurrency; now I-10 east
Graham	Safford	127.90	205.84	US 70 west – Globe	Southern end of US 70 concurrency
Graham		143.30	230.62	US 70 east – Lordsburg	Northern end of US 70 concurrency
Greenlee	Clifton	172.30	277.29	SR 75 south – Duncan	Northern terminus of SR 75
Apache	Alpine	268.30	431.79	US 260 east – Silver City	Southern end of US 260 concurrency; now US 180 north
Apache	Eagar	294.30	473.63	SR 73 south – McNary	Northern terminus of SR 73; now SR 260 west
Apache	Springerville	296.30	476.85	US 60 east – Quemado	Southern end of US 60 concurrency
Apache		298.00	479.58	US 60 west – Show Low	Northern end of US 60 concurrency
Apache	St. Johns	323.30	520.30	US 260 west / SR 61 south – Holbrook, Show Low	Northern end of US 260 concurrency; southern end of SR 61 concurrency; US 260 north is now US 180 north
Apache		347.30	558.93	SR 61 north	Northern end of SR 61 concurrency
Apache	Sanders	376.30	605.60	US 66 – Holbrook, Gallup	Northern terminus; now I-40
1.000 mi = 1.609 km; 1.000 km = 0.621 mi: Concurrency terminus

Browse numbered routes
← SR 80	SR 81 (1927–1938)	→ SR 81

== State Route 81 (1962–2003) ==
State Route 81
- Location: Apache County
- Length: 1.65 mi (2.66 km)
- Existed: 1962–2003

A map of SR 81, highlighted in red.

State Route 81 (SR 81) was a state highway in eastern Arizona that served Lyman Lake State Park, traversing 1.65 miles (2.66 kilometres) from its start at U.S. Route 180 / U.S. Route 191 between St. Johns and Springerville to Lyman Lake. The second SR 81 was first designated on December 28, 1962, along a pre-existing county road between US 180 / US 666 (later US 191) and Lyman Lake. The Arizona Department of Transportation turned the road over to the Arizona State Parks Department on June 20, 2003 as it was contained within a state park.

Major intersections

The entire route was in Apache County.

Location	mi	km	Destinations	Notes
	0.00	0.00	US 180 / US 191 – St. Johns, Springerville	Southern terminus; milepost 380.16
Lyman Lake State Park	1.65	2.66	Park access road	Northern terminus; milepost 381.81; road transitions into the park access road at a parking lot
1.000 mi = 1.609 km; 1.000 km = 0.621 mi: Route transition

Browse numbered routes
← SR 81	SR 81 (1962–2003)	→ SR 82

== State Route 84A ==
State Route 84A
- Tucson Freeway
- Location: Tucson to South Tucson
- Length: 6.08 mi (9.78 km)
- Existed: 1951–1963

A map of SR 84A in 1958. The route is highlighted in red.

State Route 84A (SR 84A) was a branch of State Route 84 between Tucson and South Tucson beginning at SR 84 on Casa Grande Highway (now Miracle Mile) and continuing south along what is now I-10 to an interchange with US 80, US 89 and SR 84 at 6th Avenue and Tucson-Benson Highway (now Benson Highway). SR 84A was also known by the names Tucson Limited Access Highway and Tucson Freeway. Construction on SR 84A was approved in 1948, but wasn't started until December 27, 1950. Funding was initially obtained through a 1948 Tucson city bond issue.

SR 84A was opened in segments, with the first section between SR 84 and Congress Street opening on December 20, 1951. The Santa Cruz River through Tucson was diverted into a man made channel during the construction of SR 84 to keep the river from flooding the new highway. Though incomplete, all segments of the highway were opened to traffic by 1956. SR 84A was added to the Interstate Highway System in 1958 and work immediately began on converting the incomplete limited access highway into a full section of I-10. Conversion work was completed in 1961, officially making SR 84A a section of I-10. The SR 84A designation was decommissioned in favor of I-10 on October 11, 1963.

Exit list

The following represents SR 84A as it was in 1961, shortly before its conversion to I-10. The entire route was in Pima County. All exits were unnumbered.

Location	mi	km	Destinations	Notes
	0.00– 0.12	0.00– 0.19	SR 84 / SR 93 (Casa Grande Highway) to US 80 / US 89 / SR 789 – Casa Grande, Tucson	At-grade intersection; western terminus; highway continued as SR 84 west / SR 93 north; now I-10 exit 255
Tucson	2.23	3.59	Speedway Boulevard	Now I-10 exit 257
Tucson	2.69	4.33	St. Mary's Road	Planned interchange
Tucson	3.10	4.99	6th Street	Westbound exit only
Tucson	3.30	5.31	Congress Street – Downtown Tucson	Now I-10 exit 258
Tucson	4.27	6.87	22nd Street	Unfinished interchange; now I-10 exit 259
Tucson	4.78	7.69	Silverlake Road – South Tucson	Unfinished interchange; now I-10 exit 259
South Tucson	5.71– 6.08	9.19– 9.78	US 80 west / US 89 / SR 84 north / SR 93 / SR 789 (6th Avenue) to SR 86 west – Nogales, Tucson	Cloverleaf interchange; eastern termini of SR 84A and SR 84; now I-10 exit 261
South Tucson	5.71– 6.08	9.19– 9.78	US 80 east (Tucson-Benson Highway) – Benson	Continuation beyond eastern terminus
1.000 mi = 1.609 km; 1.000 km = 0.621 mi: Incomplete access; Unopened

Browse numbered routes
← SR 84	SR 84A	→ SR 85

== State Route 89L ==
State Loop Route 89
- Lake Powell Boulevard
- Location: Page
- Length: 3.41 mi (5.49 km)
- Existed: 1968–2001

A map of SR 89L, highlighted in red.

State Loop Route 89 (SR 89L) was a 3.41-mile (5-kilometre) long state highway in Page, Arizona. SR 89L was first commissioned through Page on February 21, 1968. Although the number indicated that SR 89L was a loop for SR 89, it served as a business loop for U.S. Route 89 (US 89) through the town of Page. It did not intersect SR 89. Moreover, it was the only Arizona state highway known to have used the "L" suffix. The route followed Lake Powell Boulevard through Page, intersecting with Coppermine Road, which was a former section of SR 98. SR 89L was removed from the state highway system on December 14, 2001.

Major intersections

The entire route was in Page, Coconino County.

mi	km	Destinations	Notes
0.00	0.00	US 89 – Flagstaff, Glen Canyon Dam, Kanab	Southern terminus; milepost 550.65
1.53	2.46	Coppermine Road	Former SR 98 east; milepost 548.77
3.41	5.49	US 89 – Flagstaff, Glen Canyon Dam, Kanab	Northern terminus; milepost 550.65
1.000 mi = 1.609 km; 1.000 km = 0.621 mi

Browse numbered routes
← SR 89A	SR 89L	→ SR 90

== State Route 93 ==
State Route 93
- Location: Wickenburg to Nogales
- Length: 247.13 mi (397.72 km)
- Existed: 1946–1985

State Route 93 (SR 93) was a state highway in Arizona that existed from 1946 to 1985. The route was cosigned with other highways along nearly all of its route from Kingman to the border at Nogales. State Route 93 was the original designation for the highway from Kingman to Wickenburg, which was built in 1946. At some point prior to 1964 the northern terminus of the state route was moved south to the unnamed desert junction with U.S. 89 just north of Wickenburg, and the southern terminus of U.S. 93 was moved route south to the U.S. 89 junction. At that junction a driver would pass from U.S. 93 onto State Route 93. When U.S. 89 was reduced to state highway status in the 1990s, U.S. 93's southern terminus was moved south a few miles to U.S. 60 in Wickenburg. For some unknown reason, the Arizona Highway Department either never sought, or was never granted, U.S. Highway status for Route 93 across the rest of the state.

== State Route 153 ==
State Route 153
- Sky Harbor Expressway
- Location: Phoenix
- Length: 2.12 mi (3.41 km)
- Existed: 1985–2007

State Route 153, also known as the Sky Harbor Expressway, was a state highway in Maricopa County, Arizona, that used to run from the intersection of 44th Street and Washington Street in Phoenix south to University Drive. It was a controlled access arterial expressway, with a speed limit of 45 mph (72 km/h), lower than the standard freeway speed of 65 mph (105 km/h). SR 153 was also a north–south route that skirts the eastern edge of Phoenix Sky Harbor International Airport, and along with SR 143, SR 153 served a portion of East Valley residents with access to the airport. The majority of them used SR 143 instead, because of its quick access to and from Interstate 10 and Loop 202. SR 153 did, however, provide a direct link between east Phoenix, such as office developments in the Southbank commercial project, and the city of Tempe. It was decommissioned as a state highway and transferred to the city of Phoenix on October 19, 2007.

== State Route 160 ==
State Route 160
- Location: Payson to Show Low
- Length: 94.21 mi (151.62 km)
- Existed: 1955–1969

A map of SR 160, highlighted in red.

State Route 160 (SR 160) was a 94.21-mile (151.62-kilometre) long east–west state highway in north-central Arizona, starting in the city of Payson and ending in the city of Show Low, traveling along much of the Mogollon Rim. SR 260 was originally commissioned on January 10, 1955 from U.S. Route 60 in Show Low to Heber, designated along county maintained roads. On January 2, 1962, SR 260 was further extended from Heber to State Route 87 in Payson. The highway was decommissioned on December 4, 1969 when State Route 260 took over its route, because U.S. Route 160 was extended into Arizona on a different alignment in the northeastern corner of the state.

Major intersections

County	Location	mi	km	Destinations	Notes
Gila	Payson	0.00	0.00	SR 87 – Mesa, Winslow	Western terminus; milepost 251.87
Navajo	Heber-Overgaard	53.66	86.36	SR 277 east – Snowflake	Western terminus of SR 277; milepost 305.53
Navajo	Show Low	94.21	151.62	US 60 / SR 77 – Globe, Springerville, Holbrook	Eastern terminus; milepost 346.08
1.000 mi = 1.609 km; 1.000 km = 0.621 mi

Browse numbered routes
← US 160	SR 160	→ US 164

== State Route 164 ==
State Route 164
- Location: Valle to Flagstaff
- Length: 50.90 mi (81.92 km)
- Existed: 1960–1962

A map of SR 164, highlighted in red.

State Route 164 (SR 164) was a 50.90-mile (81.92-kilometre) long highway in the northern part of Arizona. SR 164 was established on July 26, 1960 from existing county roads between Valle and Flagstaff. The highway started at the town of Valle, at a junction with State Route 64, traveling southeast to Flagstaff to a junction with US 66 and US 89. The route later became part of U.S. Route 180 on October 19, 1962, when it was extended further west. The number was reused on U.S. Route 164 in 1965.

Major intersections

The entire route was in Coconino County.

Location	mi	km	Destinations	Notes
Valle	0.00	0.00	SR 64 – Williams, Tuba City	Western terminus
Flagstaff	50.90	81.92	US 66 / US 89 (Santa Fe Avenue) – Williams, Winslow, Page	Eastern terminus
1.000 mi = 1.609 km; 1.000 km = 0.621 mi

Browse numbered routes
← US 164	SR 164	→ SR 166

== State Route 166 ==
State Route 166
- Location: Coconino County
- Length: 2.79 mi (4.49 km)
- Existed: 1958–1970

A map of SR 166, highlighted in red.

State Route 166 (SR 166), was a 2.79-mile (4-kilometre) long state highway in the north-central part of Arizona, starting at a junction with Interstate 40 / U.S. Route 66 within the Flagstaff city limits and ending at the Walnut Canyon National Monument. SR 166 was first commissioned as a state highway on April 7, 1958. The route was decommissioned on June 4, 1970 when the city of Flagstaff and Cocononino County took over ownership and maintenance of the route to national monument. Today, the highway is known as Walnut Canyon Road.

Major intersections

The entire route was in Coconino County.

Location	mi	km	Destinations	Notes
Walnut Canyon National Monument	0.00	0.00	Entrance station	Southern terminus; milepost 226.94; becomes the entry road to Walnut Canyon Visitor Center
	2.79	4.49	I-40 / US 66 – Flagstaff, Winslow	Northern terminus; milepost 224.15
1.000 mi = 1.609 km; 1.000 km = 0.621 mi trans

Browse numbered routes
← SR 164	SR 166	→ SR 169

== State Route 170 ==
State Route 170
- Location: Peridot–San Carlos
- Length: 4.01 mi (6.45 km)
- Existed: 1955–2005

BIA Route 170
- Location: Peridot–San Carlos
- Length: 4.01 mi (6.45 km)
- Existed: 2005–present

A map of SR 270/BIA 270. The main route is highlighted in red, SR 170Y in blue.

State Route 170 (SR 170) was a north–south state highway in eastern Arizona. SR 170 was first added to the state highway system on July 1, 1955. It was supplementary to U.S. Route 70, connecting US 70 to the town of San Carlos on the San Carlos Indian Reservation. SR 170 had a total length of 4 miles (6.4 km). The route was decertified on February 18, 2005. The road still exists today as BIA Route 170.

Major intersections

The entire route was in Gila County.

Location	mi	km	Destinations	Notes
Peridot	0.00	0.00	BIA Route 3 south (Coolidge Dam Access Road) / Entrance road (SR 170Y south) to US 70 (Old West Highway) – Globe, Safford, Coolidge Dam	Southern terminus of SR 170; milepost 271.06; northern terminus of BIA 3; former US 180 south
San Carlos	4.01	6.45	BIA Route 6 west / BIA Route 10 east (Pinal Street) / San Carlos Avenue – Cutter, McNary	Northern terminus of SR 170; milepost 275.07; eastern terminus of BIA 6; western terminus of BIA 10; BIA 6 and BIA 10 are former SR 73
1.000 mi = 1.609 km; 1.000 km = 0.621 mi

Browse numbered routes
← SR 169	SR 170	→ SR 172

== State Route 172 ==
State Route 172
- Location: Yuma County
- Length: 14.01 mi (22.55 km)
- Existed: 1958–1962

A map of SR 172 as it was in 1959, highlighted in red.

State Route 172 (SR 172) was a 14.01-mile (22.55-kilometre) long state highway along the western part of Arizona. It was established for a route from the town of Parker to Parker Dam, along the Colorado River on March 10, 1958. An extension to US 66 near Topock was proposed, and approved on January 10, 1961. The first segment of the extension was completed designated part of SR 172 on July 14, 1961 between Site Six (present day Lake Havasu City) and US 66.

SR 172 was decommissioned on August 17, 1962, after both completed sections of SR 172, the proposed route of SR 172, and all of SR 72 from Hope to Parker, were designated as a northern extension of SR 95. Today, the northernmost stretch of former SR 172 from the Parker Dam to present day SR 95 is designated as SR 95 Spur.

Major intersections

This table reflects SR 172 as it appeared on the 1959 State Highway Log. The entire route was in Yuma County.

Location	mi	km	Destinations	Notes
Parker	0.00	0.00	SR 72 – Quartzsite	Southern terminus
Colorado River	14.01	22.55	Parker Dam	
Colorado River	14.01	22.55	Parker Dam Road	Continuation into California, milepost 17.00
1.000 mi = 1.609 km; 1.000 km = 0.621 mi

Browse numbered routes
← SR 170	SR 172	→ SR 173

== State Route 173 ==
State Route 173
- Location: Show Low to Indian Pine
- Length: 15.84 mi (25.49 km)
- Existed: 1938–1972

A map of SR 173, highlighted in red.

State Route 173 (SR 173) was a 15.84-mile (25.49-kilometre) long north–south state highway in north-central Arizona, that connected U.S. Route 60 in Show Low to State Route 73 at Indian Pine. The entirety of SR 173 was designated as a state highway on June 20, 1938, with the route remaining mostly unchanged throughout the highway's existence. SR 173 was decommissioned, when it became part of SR 260 on August 11, 1972.

Major intersections

The entire route was in Navajo County.

Location	mi	km	Destinations	Notes
Show Low	0.00	0.00	US 60 – Phoenix, Globe, Springerville	Western terminus; milepost 341.68
Indian Pine	15.84	25.49	SR 73 – Eagar, Whiteriver	Eastern terminus; milepost 355.89
1.000 mi = 1.609 km; 1.000 km = 0.621 mi

Browse numbered routes
← SR 172	SR 173	→ SR 177

== State Route 279 ==
State Route 279
- Location: Cottonwood–Camp Verde
- Length: 12.26 mi (19.73 km)
- Existed: 1955–1989

A map of SR 279, highlighted in red.

State Route 279 (SR 279) was a 12.26-mile (19.73-kilometre) long state route that originally ran from Interstate 17 / State Route 79 in Camp Verde to U.S. Route 89A (present-day State Route 89A) in downtown Cottonwood. The route was designated as a state highway on January 10, 1955, from an existing county maintained road between SR 79 in Camp Verde and US 89A in Cottonwood. On September 17, 1971, SR 279 was designated along a bypass and truck route built by Yavapai County between the existing northern terminus of SR 279 at US 89A in Cottonwood to a junction with US 89A in Clarkdale. SR 279 was truncated back to its original terminus in Cottonwood on January 7, 1977, when US 89A was re-routed onto the bypass.

The entire route was replaced by State Route 260 when the latter route was extended from Payson across SR 87 and the General Crook Trail on December 15, 1989. An old loop road labeled "Old Highway 279" runs from East Cherry Creek Road, just northeast of a traffic circle with SR 260, heading northwest before returning to SR 260 near the Hayfield Draw Off-Highway Vehicle Recreation Area. This segment is not paved along its entire length.

Major intersections

The entire route was in Yavapai County.

Location	mi	km	Destinations	Notes
Camp Verde	0.00	0.00	I-17 – Flagstaff, Phoenix	Southern terminus; milepost 287.31; I-17 exit 287 (former SR 79)
Cottonwood	12.26	19.73	US 89A – Sedona, Clarkdale, Jerome	Northern terminus; milepost 299.57
1.000 mi = 1.609 km; 1.000 km = 0.621 mi

Browse numbered routes
← SR 277	SR 279	→ SR 280

== State Route 280 ==
State Route 280
- Avenue 3E
- Location: Yuma
- Length: 1.47 mi (2.37 km)
- Existed: 1968–2007

A map of SR 280 highlighted in red.

State Route 280 (SR 280) was a state highway in Yuma County, Arizona, which existed entirely within the city of Yuma. SR 280 was the shortest state highway in Arizona, at 1.47 miles (2.37 km) in length. The highway was designated along Avenue 3E, from its junction with the north Interstate 8 Frontage Road in Yuma, past a junction with I-8 exit 3 to East 32nd Street, which serves as I-8 Business (former US 80). Avenue 3E south of I-8 BL provided direct access to Marine Corps Air Station Yuma, while westbound I-8 BL provided access to Yuma International Airport and the Yuma County Fairgrounds.

SR 280 was established in 1968, along Avenue 3E between US 80 and I-8. The route of SR 280 would remain mostly unchanged until the designation was retired. Yuma County had previously maintained Avenue 3E before the state takeover. The entire roadway was reconstructed and improved by the Arizona State Highway Department to state highway standards in 1969. The route was turned over to the city of Yuma on April 20, 2007 for maintenance.

Major intersections

The entire route was in Yuma, Yuma County.

mi	km	Destinations	Notes
0.00	0.00	BL 8 (East 32nd Street) / South Avenue 3E – Yuma Airport, County Fairgrounds, Marine Corps Air Station	Southern terminus; road continues as South Avenue 3E
1.31– 1.39	2.11– 2.24	I-8 – San Diego, Phoenix, Tucson	I-8 exit 3
1.47	2.37	Frontage Road / South Avenue 3E to US 95	Northern terminus; road continues as South Avenue 3E
1.000 mi = 1.609 km; 1.000 km = 0.621 mi

Browse numbered routes
← SR 279	SR 280	→ SR 286

== State Route 360 ==
State Route 360
- Superstition Freeway
- Location: Phoenix to Apache Junction
- Length: 26.41 mi (42.50 km)
- Existed: 1971–1992

State Route 360 (SR 360) was a 26.41-mile (43-kilometre) long state route located in the Phoenix, Arizona area of the United States. The SR 360 designation was approved along the proposed Superstition Freeway corridor on January 18, 1963. The corridor was assigned along a route from Interstate 10 in Tempe through Mesa to U.S. Route 60 (US 60), US 70, US 80, and US 89 in Apache Junction. The first section of SR 360 was open to traffic between I-10 and Mill Avenue in Tempe in 1971. The freeway was finally completed to US 60/US 89 in Apache Junction in 1991. On September 18, 1992, US 60, which entered the Phoenix area on surface streets north of SR 360, was realigned onto the Superstition Freeway, replacing SR 360 in its entirety.

== State Route 364 ==
State Route 364
- Navajo Trail
- Location: Apache County
- Length: 5.41 mi (8.71 km)
- Existed: 1962–1965

A map of SR 364, highlighted in red.

State Route 364 (SR 364) was a 5.41-mile (9-kilometre) long state highway in the northeastern corner of the state of Arizona, starting at State Route 64 (SR 64) in the town of Teec Nos Pos and ending at the New Mexico state-line near the Four Corners. SR 364 was designated on September 9, 1961, when the Arizona State Highway Department took ownership of the existing road between Teec Nos Pos and the Four Corners. However, the route wasn't completed or open to the public until September 16, 1962. SR 364 made up part of a larger named route called the Navajo Trail, which ran from US 89 north of Flagstaff, along SR 64 and 364 into New Mexico and Colorado, ending at US 666. The route was decommissioned on September 29, 1965, when the entirety of SR 364 and the section of SR 64 between US 89 and Teec Nos Pos became part of the newly designated U.S. Route 164. U.S. Route 164 later became part of U.S. Route 160 in 1969.

Major intersections

The entire route was in Apache County.

Location	mi	km	Destinations	Notes
Teec Nos Pos	0.00	0.00	SR 64 – Kayenta, Shiprock	Southern terminus; milepost 465.40
New Mexico state line	5.41	8.71	Navajo Trail north – Cortez	Northern terminus; milepost 470.81; road continues into New Mexico
1.000 mi = 1.609 km; 1.000 km = 0.621 mi

Browse numbered routes
← SR 360	SR 364	→ SR 366

== State Route 464 ==
State Route 464
- Location: Navajo County
- Length: 23.19 mi (37.32 km)
- Existed: 1960–1970

A map of SR 464, highlighted in red.

State Route 464 (SR 464) was a 23.19-mile (37.32-kilometre) long state highway in the northeastern corner of the state of Arizona, starting in the town of Kayenta and ending at Utah State Route 47 (SR-47) at the Arizona–Utah state line. SR-47 served as a continuation for SR 464 to Mexican Hat. SR 464 was designated in 1960 and was decommissioned in 1970 when both SR 464 and SR-47 were renumbered to U.S. Route 163. The route went through Monument Valley.

Major intersections

The entire route was in Navajo County.

Location		km	Destinations	Notes
Kayenta	0.00	0.00	US 160 – Red Mesa, Tuba City	Southern terminus; milepost 393.52
Utah state line	23.19	37.32	SR-47 north – Mexican Hat	Northern terminus; continuation into Utah; milepost 416.71
1.000 mi = 1.609 km; 1.000 km = 0.621 mi

Browse numbered routes
← SR 410	SR 464	→ US 466

== State Route 504 ==
State Route 504
- Location: Apache County
- Length: 4.17 mi (6.71 km)
- Existed: 1965–1989

A map of SR 504, highlighted in red.

State Route 504 (SR 504) was a state highway in the northeastern corner of the state of Arizona, starting at U.S. Route 160 (US 160) in the town of Teec Nos Pos and ending at the New Mexico state line, only 4.17 miles (6.71 km) away. It continued on as State Road 504 into New Mexico. On September 29, 1965, US 164 was designated over the entirety of SR 64 between Teec Nos Pos and US 89. When SR 64 was truncated to US 89 on December 17, 1965, in favor of US 164, the remainder of SR 64 between Teec Nos Pos and the New Mexico state line was redesignated as SR 504. US 164 later became an extension of US 160 on June 6, 1969, when the latter highway was re-routed into Arizona. Both SR 504 and NM 504 were decommissioned on December 2, 1988, when both highways became a western extension of US 64 into Arizona.

Major intersections

The entire route was in Apache County.

Location	mi	km	Destinations	Notes
Teec Nos Pos	0.00	0.00	US 160 – Kayenta, Cortez	Western terminus; milepost 465.40
New Mexico state line	4.17	6.71	NM 504 east – Shiprock	Eastern terminus; milepost 469.57; continues as NM 504 into New Mexico
1.000 mi = 1.609 km; 1.000 km = 0.621 mi

Browse numbered routes
← SR 473	SR 504	→ SR 564

== State Route 789 ==
State Route 789
- Location: Nogales to the New Mexico state line
- Existed: 1956–1965

State Route 789 was a state highway in the eastern part of the state of Arizona, starting in the town of Nogales and ending at the New Mexico state line near Gallup on old U.S. Route 66 (presently Interstate 40). The route was cosigned with other routes, including U.S. Route 89 North from Nogales to Tucson, U.S. Route 80/U.S. Route 89 north from Tucson to U.S. Route 60 and U.S. Route 70 at Florence Junction, east on 60/70 to Globe and then 60 past Show Low to State Route 61, then east on 61 to U.S. 666 north of Springerville, where it overlapped U.S. 666 and U.S. 66 to Gallup N.M. It first appeared on an Arizona state map in 1956 and was decommissioned around 1965 when the route was decertified.

State Route 789 was a leg of a proposed U.S. 789, a number proposed for the Canada to Mexico Highway. Boosters wanted to route this new highway marked from Nogales, Arizona, north to Sweetgrass, Montana. Since the highway was to be routed along existing U.S. highways for the majority of its journey, an application for this route to be signed as a U.S. highway was denied by AASHTO. One remnant of U.S. 789 in Wyoming remains to this day as Wyoming 789.

U.S 789 was to continue north with U.S. 666 through Farmington into Cortez, Colorado. U.S. 160 and State Route 789 turned east to serve Durango.

At Durango, State Route 789 turned north again, this time via U.S. 550. At Montrose, State Route 789 followed U.S. 50 northwest to Grand Junction, then turned east again, this time via U.S. 6-24 (now Interstate 70). At Rifle, State Route 789 turned north along Colo. 13, which took State Route 789 to its present Wyoming routing at Baggs. State Route 789 is still designated through Wyoming today; see the routing section above. North of Frannie, State Route 789 continued into Montana via U.S. 310 to Laurel. State Route 789 turned east via U.S. 10-212 (now Interstate 90 and U.S. 212) into Billings. U.S. 87 and State Route 789 merged from Billings all the way to Great Falls, which brought SR 789 westward again. Then State Route 789 turned due north along U.S. 91 (now I-15) to its end at Sweetgrass, Montana.

As the Association of American State Highway Administrators never approved the concept of U.S. 789, all the state route segments started to disappear, with State Route 789 decertified about 1965.

The only stand-alone section of putative U.S. 789 is a section of Wyoming 789.

Browse numbered routes
← US 666	SR 789	→ SR 989
