= 2015 Amado checkpoint protest =

Demonstration in Arizona

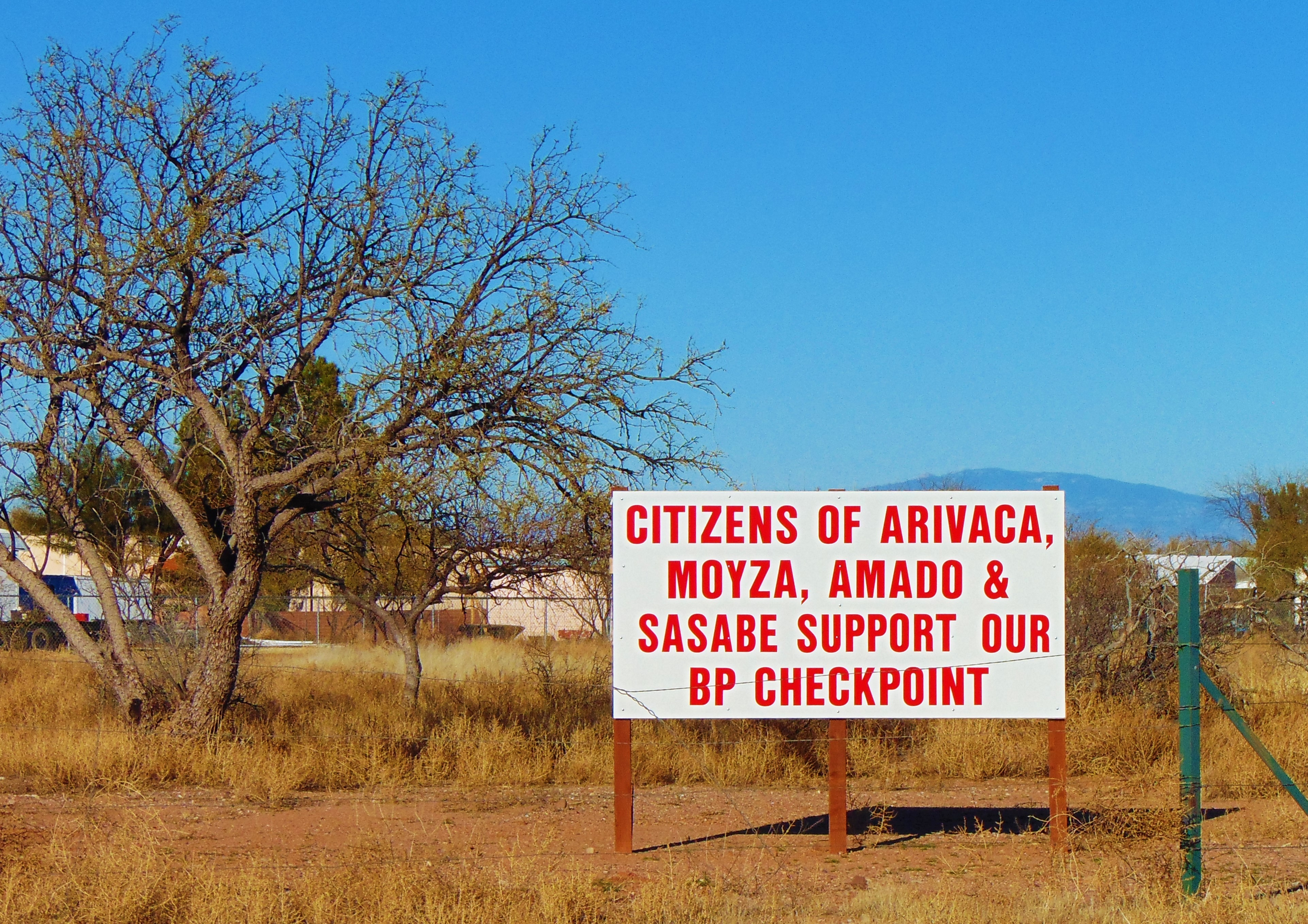
- Local citizens in Amado and other neighboring communities erected this sign in support of the Border Patrol checkpoint.
- Date: May 27, 2015
- Location: Amado, Arizona, U.S.
- Outcome: Border Patrol checkpoints remain open.

The 2015 Amado checkpoint protest took place on May 27, 2015, when approximately seventy-five protesters held a demonstration at the United States Border Patrol checkpoint along Arivaca Road in Amado, Arizona, about 35 miles south of Tucson.

Established in 2007, the checkpoint is the smallest of the eleven Border Patrol checkpoints near the U.S.–Mexico border in southern Arizona, with only four or five agents manning the post at a time. It is located in a rural area outside the town of Amado, on the main road to Arivaca, a small community near the international border. The demonstrators cited privacy concerns, the nuisance of having to go through the checkpoint, and the potential for racial profiling as reasons for the protest, and wanted it removed. Smaller demonstrations also occurred at other checkpoints in the area, the nearest located a few miles south of Amado, in Agua Linda, along Interstate 19, but the Amado protest was the largest. In anticipation of the protest, 50 Border Patrol agents manned the checkpoint to help keep order.

Government authorities say the checkpoints are "vital to catching immigration violations, drug smugglers and human traffickers," but some local residents are unhappy about having to answer the Border Patrol agents' questions every time they pass through. Border Patrol official Manny Padilla, who manages the Tucson Sector of the international border, commented on the Amado protest; explaining that stopping people inside the United States is a "crucial component" of the strategy to stop illegal drug and human smugglers, who operate on both sides of the border. Padilla also said: "It's very difficult to stop all traffic at the immediate border."

A sign in support of the checkpoint was posted a few hundred feet from where the demonstration was held, reading "Citizens of Arivaca, Moyza, Amado, & Sasabe Support Our BP Checkpoint".

== See also ==
- Illegal immigration in the United States
