= Illegal drug trade in the United States =

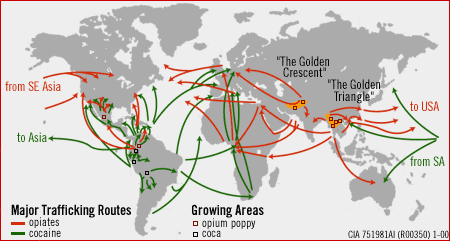
International drug routes.

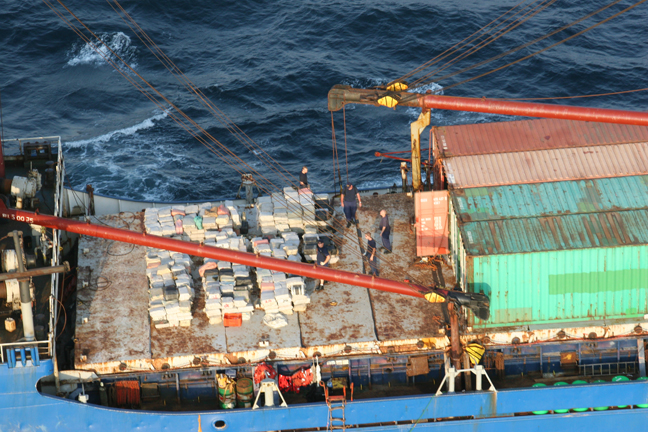
Panamanian motor vessel Gatun during the largest cocaine bust in US Coast Guard history (totalling 20 tons, worth over 600 million USD), off the coast of Panama.

The US federal government is an opponent of the illegal drug trade; however, state laws vary greatly and in some cases contradict federal laws.

The Organization of American States estimated that the revenue for cocaine sales in the US was $34 billion in 2013. The Office of National Drug Control Policy estimates that $100 billion worth of illegal drugs were sold in the US in 2013.

In the fiscal year of 2023, a total of 19,066 cases related to drugs were reported, with drug trafficking accounting for 18,939 of these cases. The majority of drug trafficking crimes, amounting to 98.1%, involved seven specific types of drugs. Quick Facts offers a general understanding of these crimes, although the details may differ depending on the specific drug involved in the offense. In 2024, it was reported that LAX airport is the central hub for narcotics in the US, perhaps even the world.

In the United States, "narcotics" and "drugs" are legally considered different classes and/or types of substances.

== War on drugs ==
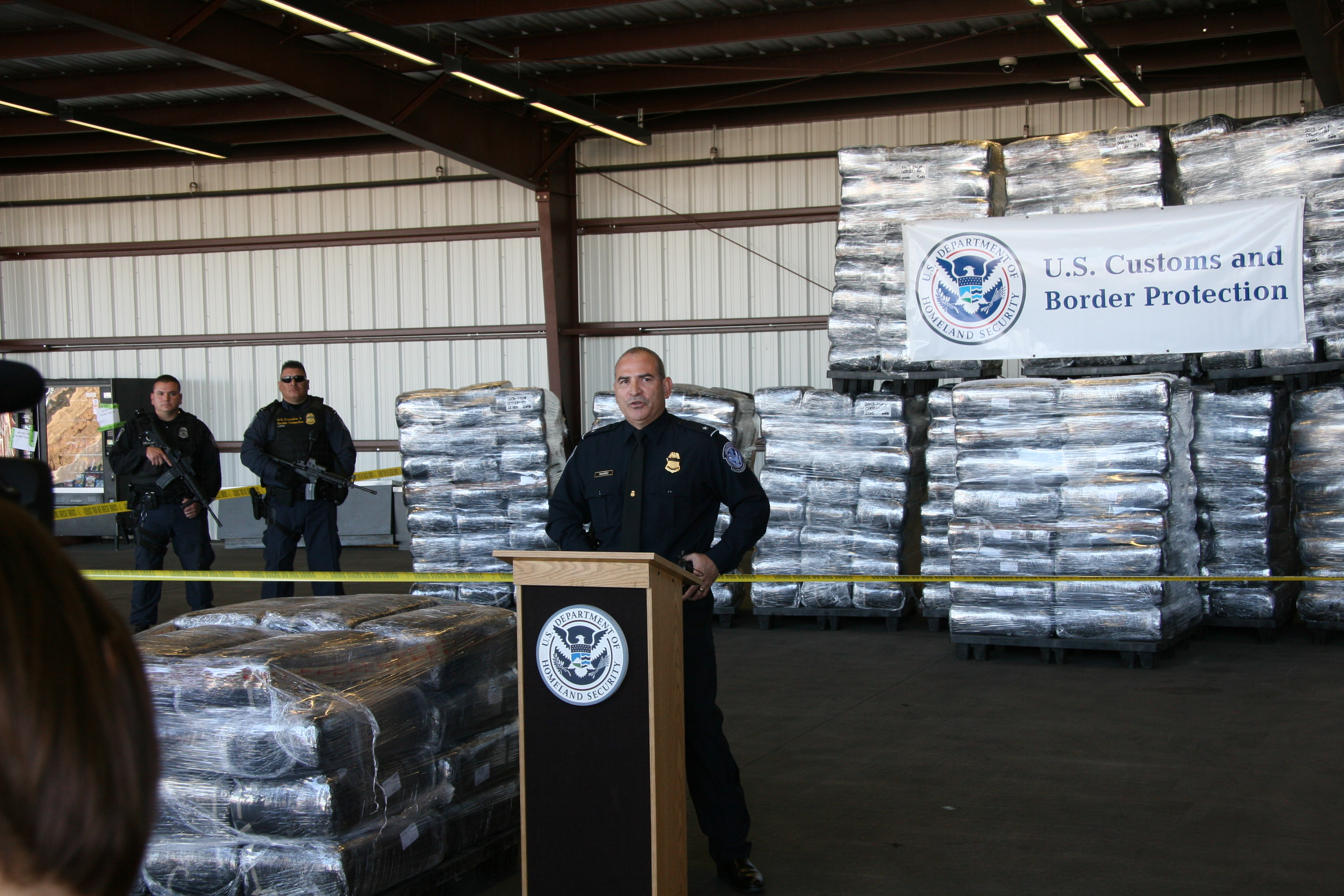
Marijuana seized at the Nogales border by both US Border Patrol and U.S. Customs and Border Protection

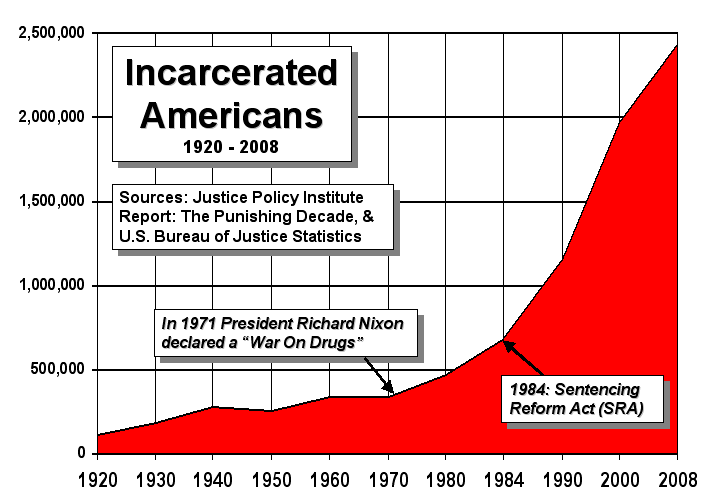
Total incarceration in the US by year

Video of drug smugglers in high-speed boat dumping 2,300 pounds (1,000 kg) of cocaine in Eastern Pacific Ocean

The "war on drugs" is a term commonly applied to a campaign of prohibition and foreign military aid and military intervention undertaken by the US government, with the assistance of participating countries, and the stated aim to define and reduce the illegal drug trade. This initiative includes a set of drug policies of the US that are intended to discourage the production, distribution, and consumption of illegal psychoactive drugs. The term was first used by US president Richard Nixon after a press conference in 1971, and was later popularized by the media.

== Minors ==
The US government's most recent 2005 National Survey on Drug Use and Health (NSDUH) reported that nationwide over 800,000 adolescents ages 12–17 sold illegal drugs during the twelve months preceding the survey. The 2005 Youth Risk Behavior Survey by the US Centers for Disease Control and Prevention (CDC) reported that nationwide 25.4% of students had been offered, sold, or given an illegal drug by someone on school property. The prevalence of having been offered, sold, or given an illegal drug on school property ranged from 15.5% to 38.8% across state CDC surveys (median: 26.1%) and from 20.3% to 40.0% across local surveys (median: 29.4%).

Despite over US$7 billion spent annually towards arresting and prosecuting nearly 800,000 people across the country for marijuana offenses in 2005 (FBI Uniform Crime Reports), the federally funded Monitoring the Future Survey reports about 85% of high school seniors find marijuana “easy to obtain.” That figure has remained virtually unchanged since 1975, never dropping below 82.7% in three decades of national surveys.

In 2009, the Justice Department identified more than 200 US cities in which Mexican drug cartels "maintain drug distribution networks or supply drugs to distributors"- up from 100 three years earlier. Most of the US imports of drugs come from Mexican drug cartels. In the US, around 195 cities have been infiltrated by drug trafficking that originated in Mexico. An estimated $10bn of the Mexican drug cartel's profits come from the US, not only supplying the Mexican drug cartels with the profit necessary for survival, but also furthering America's economic dependence on drugs.

== Women ==
Women are often involved in the illegal drug trade in the US, typically in marginal, low-level roles.

== Smuggling ==
Drug smuggling across US borders may be done by several means. Packages may be carried by people, or by cars, trucks and Railcar, hidden in Compartment. Boats and submarines penetrate sea borders. Drones pass above and tunnels pass below the usual routes of smuggling.

== Cocaine ==
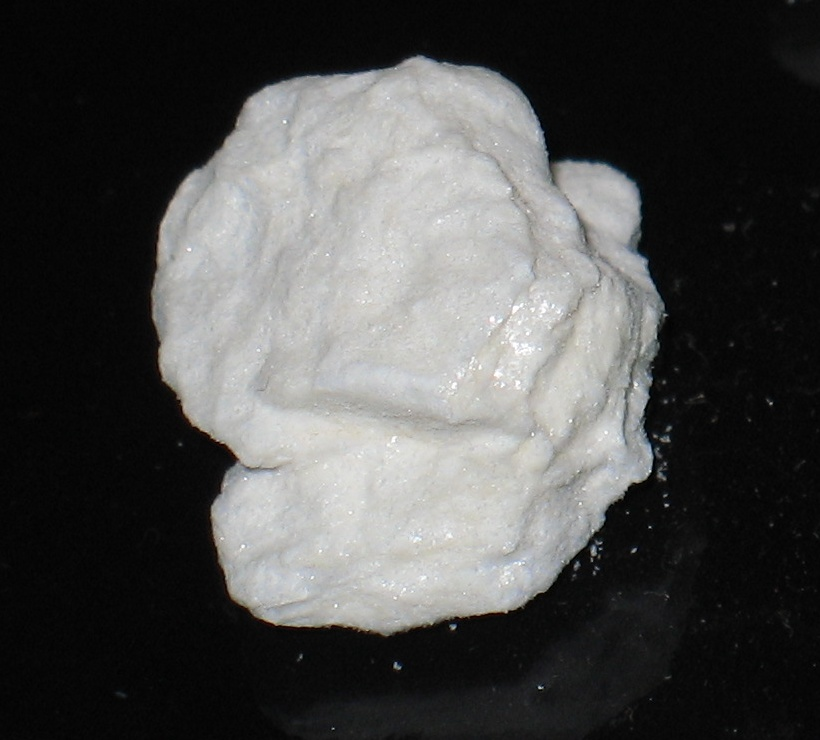
A piece of compressed cocaine powder

Cocaine is the second most popular illegal recreational drug in the US behind cannabis, and the US is the world's largest consumer of cocaine.

According to the DEA, about 93% of the cocaine in the US originated in Colombia and was smuggled across the Mexico–US border.

In 2020, the state of Oregon became the first US state to decriminalize cocaine. This new law prevents people with small amounts of cocaine from facing jail time. In 2020, the US state of Oregon would also become the first state to decriminalize the use of heroin. This measure will allow people with small amounts to avoid arrest.

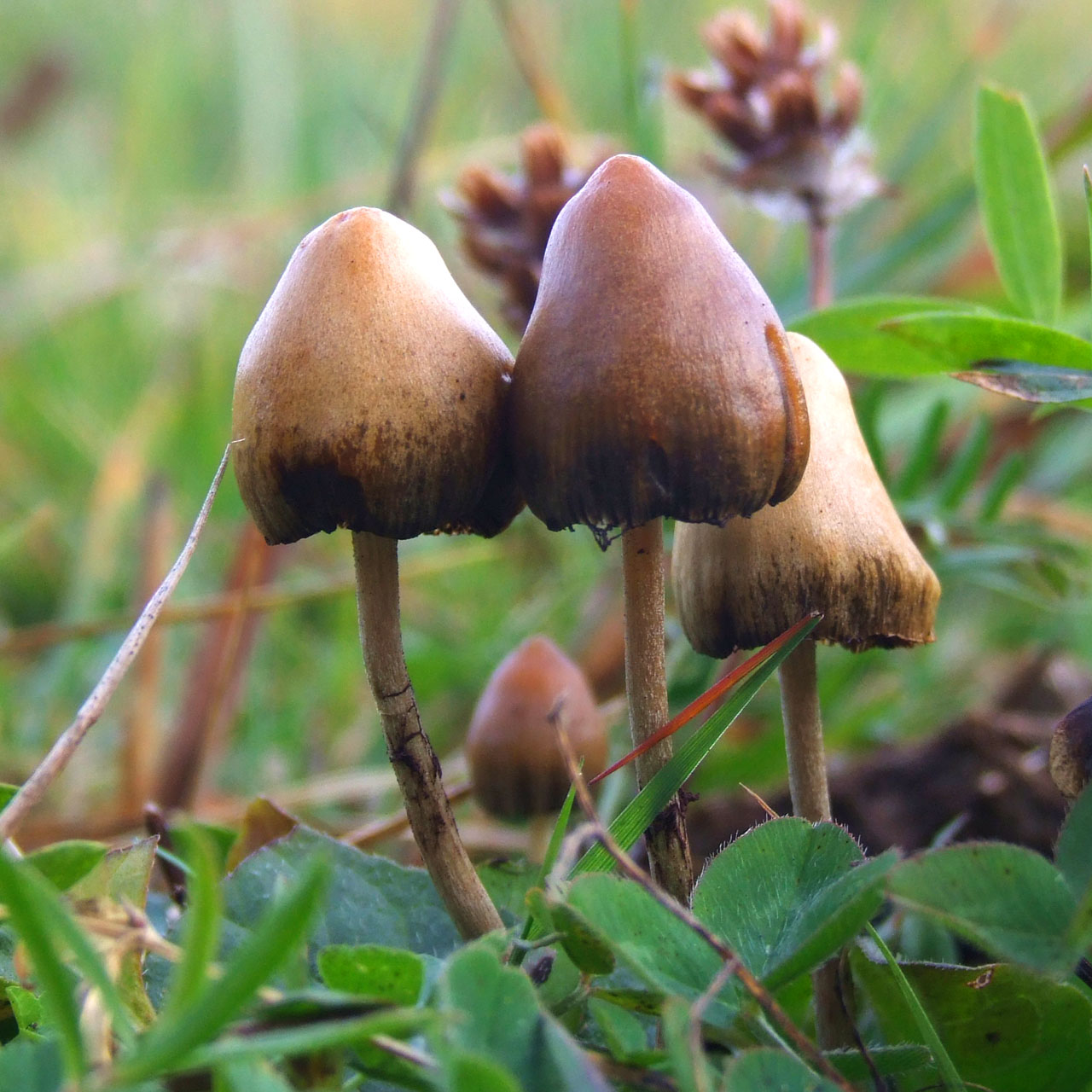
Psilocybe semilanceata, a psilocybin mushroom species sold in the U.S.

== Opioid epidemic ==
In 2021, around 80,411 people died from opioid overdoses in the US. Many of the deaths are from an extremely potent opioid, fentanyl, which is trafficked from Mexico. The drug is usually manufactured in China, then shipped to Mexico, where it is processed and packaged, which is then smuggled into the US by Mexican drug cartels.

== Doping in sports ==
Doping is the taking of performance-enhancing drugs, generally for sporting activities. Doping has been detected in many sporting codes, especially baseball and football.

Substance	Athlete population	Percentage of athletes using substance
Any substance banned by WADA	Elite athletes across sports (positive drug tests)	2% over past year
Anabolic steroids	Professional football players (self-report)	9% used at some point in career
Opiates	Professional football players (self-report)	52% used at some point in career (71% of those misused at some point in career)
Smokeless tobacco	Professional basketball players (self-report)	35%–40% over past year
	Professional football players (self-report)	20%–30% over past year

== Monitoring ==
Environmental monitoring can be used to map trafficking. Trafficking of a substance tends to incidentally, disproportionately increase its nearby usage, and thus excretion. This has been used to quantify trafficking into this country, and has also highlighted routes of smuggling through nearby countries which feed this country's large market – for example, Martinique. Drug abuse poses a significant challenge in the US, with individuals looking to abuse drugs having easy access to such substances. The abuse of prescription and nonprescription opioids remains a critical public health issue. A consequence of the widespread abuse of prescription opioids is the rise in new heroin users. This increase is partly due to a growing number of individuals transitioning from prescription opioids to heroin in search of a cheaper and more accessible alternative. Synthetic opioids, like fentanyl, are contributing significantly to the alarming increase in overdose deaths. A considerable amount of illicitly produced fentanyl originates from Mexico and China. Moreover, dangerous analogs of fentanyl, such as acetylfentanyl, are frequently manufactured in China and smuggled into the US. Fentanyl is up to 40 times more potent than heroin and approximately 100 times more potent than morphine. Acetyl fentanyl, a close relative of fentanyl, has been associated with numerous overdose fatalities in the US. Opioid-dependent individuals often use fentanyl and acetyl fentanyl as substitutes for heroin, or these substances are mixed with heroin to increase volume or enhance effects. In the 1950s and 1960s, most heroin was produced in Turkey and transshipped in France via the French Connection crime ring, with much of it arriving in the US.

== See also ==
- Bureau of Alcohol, Tobacco, Firearms, and Explosives (ATF)
- Drug Enforcement Administration (DEA)
- Drug house – "trap house" used as a retail distribution point
- Drug injection – route of use associated with track marks
- Federal Bureau of Investigation (FBI)
- Protonitazene – synthetic opioid scheduled by the DEA
- US Immigration and Customs Enforcement (ICE)
- US Customs and Border Protection (CBP)
