= Arizona State Route 289 =

State highway in Arizona, United States

State Route 289

Route information
- Maintained by ADOT
- Length: 10.52 mi (16.93 km)
- Existed: 1960–present

Major junctions
- West end: Peña Blanca Dam
- I-19 in Rio Rico, Arizona
- East end: East Frontage Road in Rio Rico

Location
- Country: United States
- State: Arizona

Highway system
- Arizona State Highway System; Interstate; US; State; Scenic Proposed; Former
← SR 288	→ Loop 303

State Route 289 (SR 289) is a highway in Santa Cruz County, Arizona that runs from its junction with Interstate 19 (old US 89 / SR 93) to the north of Nogales, to Peña Blanca Lake. It is an east–west route.

== Route description ==
SR 289 is a 10.52-mile (16.93 km) highway that serves Peña Blanca Lake, passing through sparsely inhabited territory. It does not pass through any cities or towns. From its eastern terminus at the frontage road nearly 400 feet (120 m) east of the I-19 interchange, the highway heads in a western direction before curving towards the southwest. The highway eventually curves back towards the west until it turns north towards the lake. There is a Y junction where the road branches off to the lake to the north and a forest road that continues west that connects to a very scenic drive through the Coronado National Forest. This road passes Arivaca Peak, Sycamore Canyon, the ghost town of Ruby and continues west to the town of Arivaca and SR 286. This stretch requires four-wheel drive and there are no services along the entire stretch.

== History ==
An unpaved road existed along the current route since 1935. The route was established as SR 289 in 1959, when it only ran west from US 89 to the Coronado National Forest boundary. The next year, the route was extended westward to Peña Blanca Dam. By 1971, US 89 at SR 289's eastern terminus was replaced by I-19.

== Junction list ==
The entire route is in Santa Cruz County.

Location	mi	km	Destinations	Notes
	10.52	16.93	Peña Blanca Dam	Dead end; western terminus
Rio Rico	0.15– 0.07	0.24– 0.11	I-19 – Nogales, Tucson	ADOT signs this as eastern terminus; former US 89 / SR 93; I-19 exit 12
Rio Rico	0.00	0.00	East Frontage Road	Eastern terminus; road continues as Ruby Road
1.000 mi = 1.609 km; 1.000 km = 0.621 mi
