= Interstate 19 =

Interstate Highway in southern Arizona

Interstate 19
- Nogales–Tucson Highway
- I-19 highlighted in red

Route information
- Maintained by ADOT
- Length: 102.08 km (63.43 mi)
- Existed: August 14, 1957–present
- NHS: Entire route

Major junctions
- South end: BL 19 in Nogales
- SR 189 in Nogales; BL 19 north of Nogales; SR 289 in Rio Rico; SR 86 in Tucson
- North end: I-10 in Tucson

Location
- Country: United States
- State: Arizona
- Counties: Santa Cruz, Pima

Highway system
- Interstate Highway System; Main; Auxiliary; Suffixed; Business; Future; Arizona State Highway System; Interstate; US; State; Scenic Proposed; Former
← I-17	→ SR 24

Interstate 19 (I-19) is a north–south Interstate Highway located entirely within the US state of Arizona. I-19 travels from Nogales, roughly 90 meters (300 ft) from the Mexican border, to Tucson, at I-10. The highway also travels through the cities of Rio Rico, Green Valley, and Sahuarita.

Having a total length of just over 102 kilometers (63 mi), I-19 is the ninth-shortest primary (two-digit) Interstate Highway in the contiguous 48 states, where only I-86 (Idaho), I-11 (Nevada), I-2 (Texas), I-42 (North Carolina), I-14 (Texas), I-97 (Maryland), I-87 (North Carolina), and I-42 (Arkansas) are shorter.

While the highway is short, it is a very important corridor, serving as a fast route from Tucson and Phoenix (via I-10) to the Mexican border. The highway is a portion of the US section of the CANAMEX Corridor, a trade corridor that stretches north from Mexico across the US to the Canadian province of British Columbia.

== Route description ==
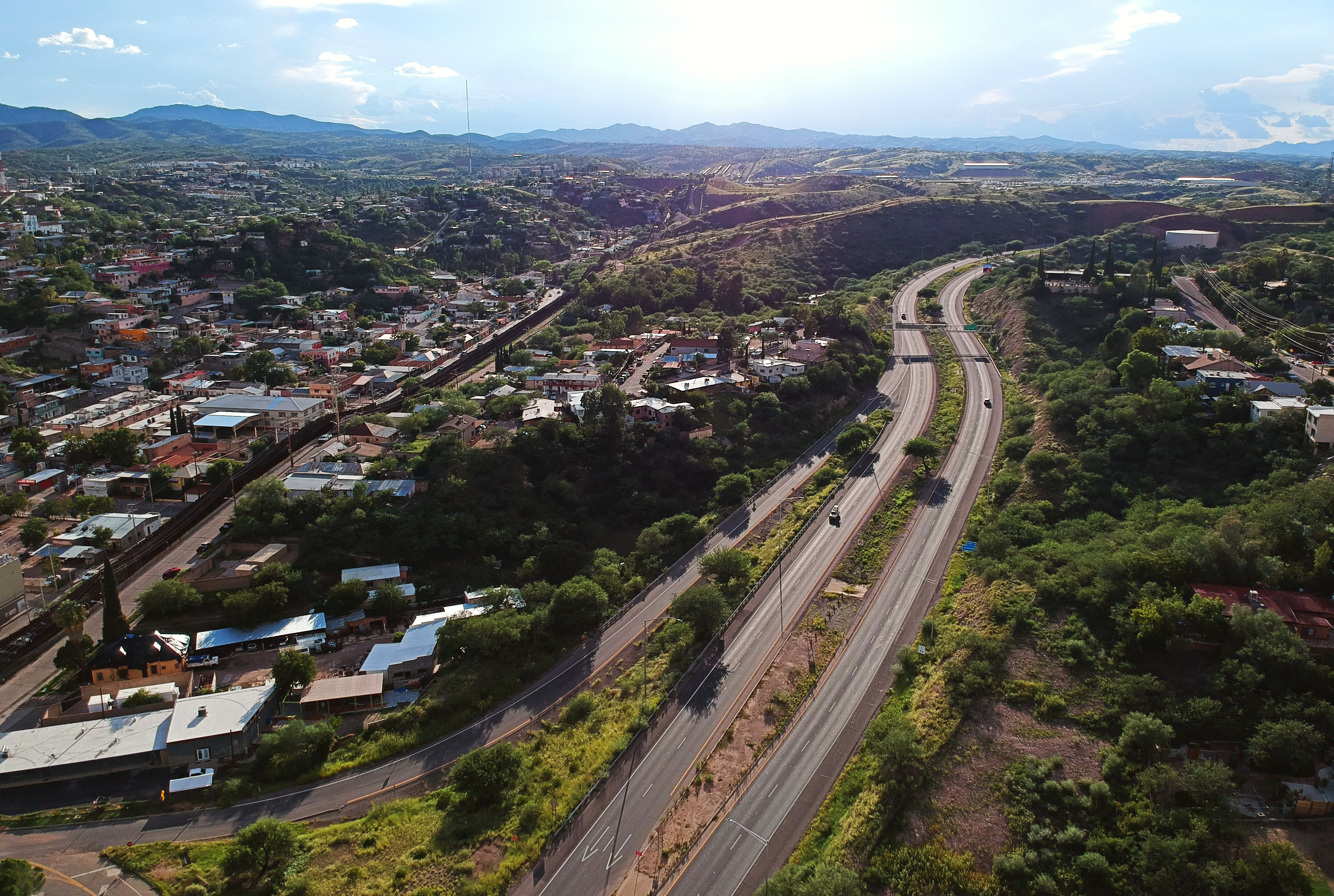
I-19 becomes an at-grade divided freeway just west of its southern terminus in Nogales. The US–Mexico border is just south of the Interstate (left of image).

In Nogales, the southern terminus of I-19 is at West Crawford Street, adjacent to the international port of entry, and southbound travelers can continue into Heroica Nogales, Mexico, via state-maintained surface roads, and connect with Federal Highway 15 (Fed. 15) either to the south or west of Nogales, Sonora.

Starting from the southern terminus at kilometer post 0 (not milepost 0), I-19 initially heads briefly south then west on surface streets, navigating its way through the town of Nogales for 0.32 kilometers (1,000 ft; 0.20 mi) before becoming an Interstate-grade freeway and making the turn to head north toward Tucson. It has interchanges with two other state highways near the southern end of the route, State Route 189 (SR 189) at exit 4 and SR 289 at exit 12. The interchange with SR 189 at exit 4 both serves to funnel traffic so as to bypass around Nogales and Heroica Nogales for travelers bound to or from Hermosillo or Mexico City and provides for the continuous flow of freight and truck traffic through the larger Nogales-Mariposa Port of Entry to Fed. 15, which has its northern terminus at the US–Mexico border with SR 189 and its southern terminus 2,179 kilometers (1,354 mi) away in Mexico City. After exiting Nogales to the north, I-19 passes near and around a series of sparsely populated towns and retirement communities along the banks of the Santa Cruz River, including Rio Rico, Tubac, Amado, Green Valley, and Sahuarita. For several miles near Amado and Green Valley, the eastward view from I-19 provides scenic views of Madera Canyon and the Santa Rita Mountains in the Coronado National Forest.

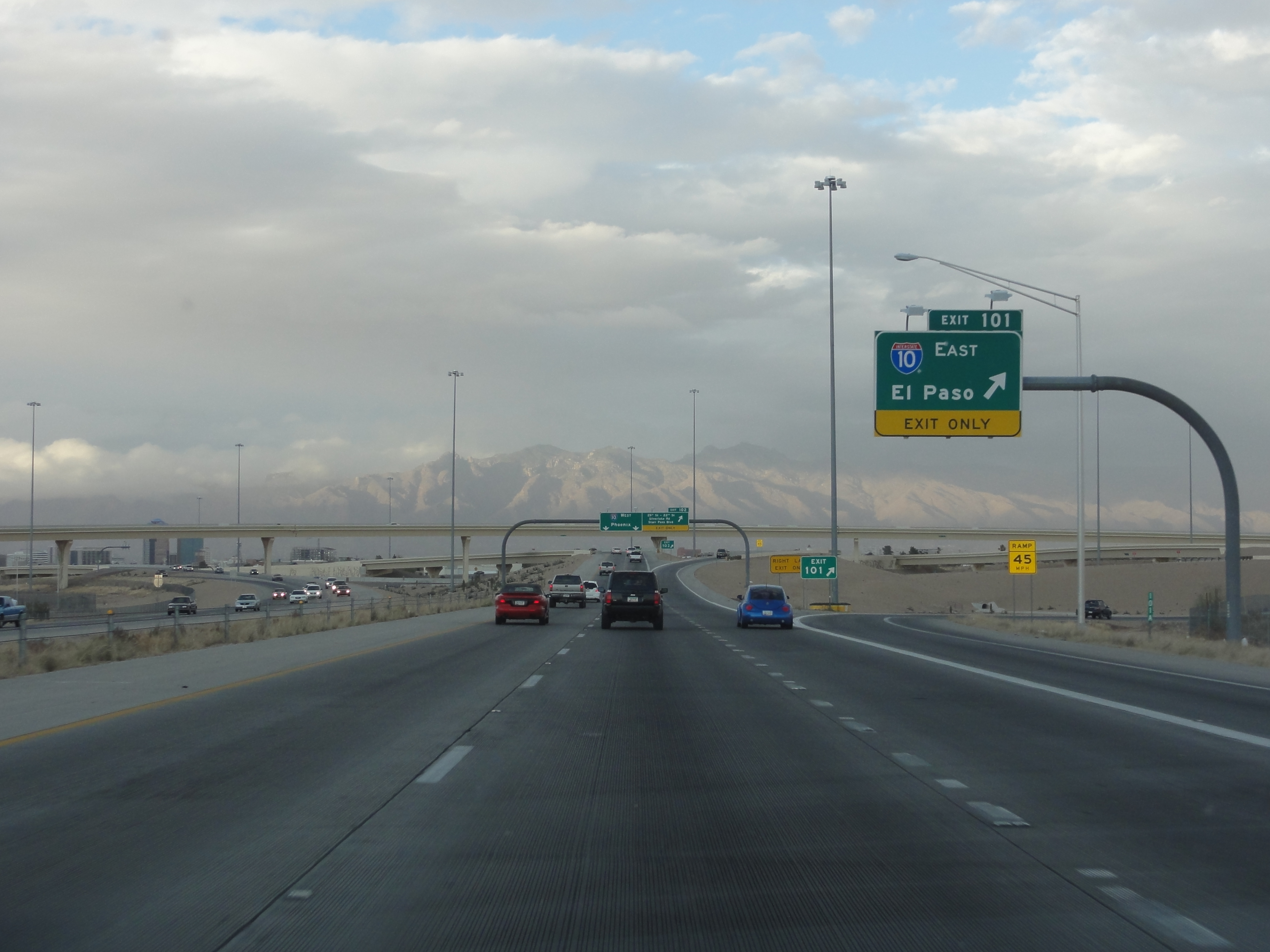
I-19 northbound at the I-10 interchange; the downtown Tucson skyline can be seen on the left.

Just before entering Tucson, I-19 passes through the eastern section of the San Xavier Indian Reservation where it makes its only crossing of the Santa Cruz River. As I-19 enters the Tucson city limits, it has an interchange with SR 86 at exit 99 before reaching its northern terminus at an interchange with I-10.

Nearly the entire route of I-19 follows, or is adjacent to, the former routing of US Route 89 (US 89) and the Santa Cruz River, which flows northward from Mexico, through Tucson and usually disperses into the desert between Marana and the Gila River, southeast of Phoenix. Most of the time, much of the river is dry, but heavy storms can cause it to overflow its banks, flooding farmland before reaching the Gila River.

=== Signage ===
I-19 Signage

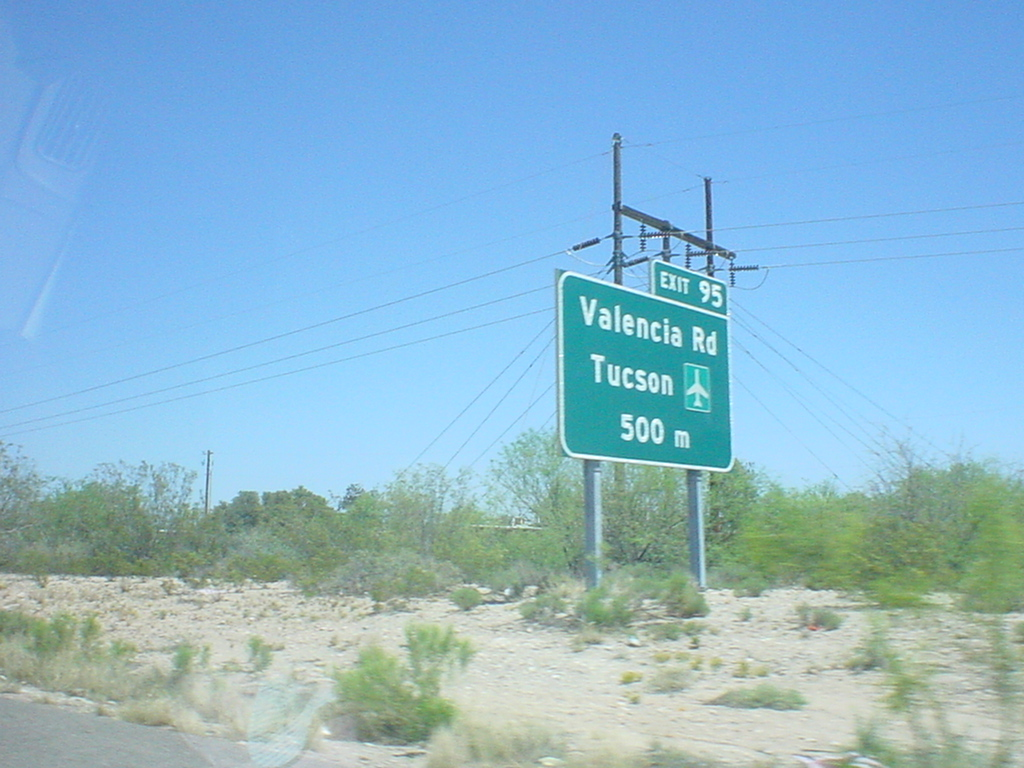
Metric-unit advance guide sign on I-19, installed as part of the Valencia Road interchange renovation

Signage along I-19 alerts drivers to the use of metric units. This illustrates a sign located near exit 99 (southbound) for West Ajo Way (SR 86).

I-19 is unique among US Interstates because signed distances are given in "meters" (hundreds or thousands as distance-to-exit indications) or "kilometers" (as distance-to-destination indications) like in Mexico and Canada, and not "miles". However, the speed limit signs give speeds in "miles per hour". According to the Arizona Department of Transportation (ADOT), metric signs were originally placed because of the push toward the metric system in the US at the time of the original construction of the highway.

I-19 had originally been signed as it was constructed, in a series of small signing contracts that used customary units. In 1980, ADOT awarded a single contract to install new signs which used metric units, to overlay customary-unit expressions on some existing signs with metric-unit expressions, to install kilometer posts, and to provide bilingual signing in select locations. The signing scheme used in 1980 provided explicit units on advance guide signs, but not on interchange sequence signs or post-interchange confirmation (distance) signs.

The expressions on advance guide signs were of the form "2 km" (1.2 miles) for distances over one kilometer (0.62 mi) and "500 m" (0.31 mi) for distances under one kilometer (0.62 mi), with no provision for fractional kilometrages. On advance guide signs, the metric unit expressions "km" and "m" were placed on the baseline where "MILES" would otherwise have gone but were sized so that their lowercase loop height matched the uppercase letter height of "MILES" on customary-unit signs.

The exception was a handful of advance guide signs for the SR 86 (Ajo Way) exit, which used "KM" (in uppercase, contrary to SI nomenclature) on the same baseline and at the same letter height as "MILES". The 1980 signing plans also provided design details for speed limit and advisory speed signs using metric units, with the limit values enclosed in a red circle on the speed limit sign and a black circle on the yellow-background advisory signs. These speed signs all had explicit units, with "km/h" below the circle enclosing the limit value. However, the advisory signs were canceled by change order and not installed.

Had the metric speed limit sign been installed, the signed speed limit on I-19 would have been 88 km/h, which is a close soft-conversion of the then-existing 55-mile-per-hour (88.51 km/h) national maximum speed limit. As Arizona's current maximum speed limit is 75 miles per hour (121 km/h), the metric equivalent would most likely read 120 kilometres per hour (74.56 mph). Information signs, to three distinct designs, were also placed at various locations on or near I-19 to advise motorists that the highway was signed in metric. Notwithstanding the metric legends, the signing plans were dimensioned entirely in feet and inches.

In 1999, ADOT awarded two contracts (administered as a single construction project) to renew the signs along the full length of I-19. The general approach toward metric signing differed from that taken in 1980. Explicit units were given not just on advance guide signs, but also on interchange sequence signs, post-interchange confirmation signs, and community interchange signs (the last-listed had not been used in 1980). On the distance signs, "km" appeared after each kilometer measurement except when one or more of the distances was a fractional kilometer.

In such cases, all the distances were given in "meters", with "meters" (written out in full, not "m") after each distance value. On distance signs in general, "km" or "meters" appeared on the same baseline and with the same letter height as the distance values, while advance guide signs were formatted as in 1980. Since a typical ADOT freeway guide sign rehabilitation contract also replaces surface road signing near those roads' interchanges with the freeway, metric-unit signs also appeared on local roads near I-19, giving distances in kilometers to tourist attractions such as Mission San Xavier del Bac.

As was the case in 1980, the signing plans were dimensioned in feet and inches. However, a number of signs near the Valencia Road interchange were replaced or amended when it was converted from a partial cloverleaf interchange to a single-point urban interchange in 2000. One of these signs has a fractional kilometrage greater than one kilometer (0.62 mi), rendered as "1500 m" (0.93 mi), while others use "m" rather than "meters" as the unit expression. Metric-unit expressions on the advance guide signs installed or modified as part of this contract appear on the same baseline as the metric values, rather than on a raised baseline as on other I-19 advance guide signs. Again, the plans were dimensioned in feet and inches.

Citing motorist confusion arising from the metric signs on I-19, ADOT's Tucson district announced that new signs on I-19 would use US customary units. To avoid the cost of replacing the metric signs all at once, signs would be replaced in specific areas of the freeway during construction projects in those areas. New signs were put into place between exit 99 (Ajo Way) and exit 101 (I-10) in 2004 after the completion of the new I-10/I-19 interchange.

As of 2010, the remainder of the project has been stalled due to local opposition, particularly from businesses that would have to change their directions.

A reconstruction project at the Interstate's northern terminus with I-10 in Tucson (at the interchange commonly called the Crossing) began in 2002 and was completed in August 2004.

== History ==
The first sections of I-19 to be opened to traffic were a 4.8-kilometer (3 mi) stub from I-10 to Valencia Road, in 1962 and a 3.2-kilometer (2 mi) stretch in Green Valley in 1963. The freeway between Rio Rico and Nogales was completed in 1974. The major section between Green Valley and Rio Rico was finished in 1978. The official completion date of the I-19 segment between Tucson (km 100) and Green Valley (actually Helmet Peak Road at km 75) was February 12, 1972. A 1978 project report for ADOT lists the entire I-19 project as "completed", which includes segments between Green Valley and Nogales.

== Future ==
I-19 is a very heavily traveled corridor in the Tucson metro area. The freeway is currently two lanes in both directions for most of its length, with the exception of the interchange with I-10 up until Irvington Road, where it transitions to four lanes. Current plans call for widening from Irvington Road to Valencia Road, bringing the freeway to three lanes in each direction. Future plans include expansion to up to five lanes in each direction by 2030 from the crossing with I-10 to San Xavier Road.

I-19 is also part of the proposed I-11 corridor between Nogales and Sahuarita.

== Exit list ==
County	Location	km	mi	Old exit	New exit	Destinations	Notes
Santa Cruz	Nogales	0.00	0.00			BL 19 (Grand Avenue) / Crawford Street	ADOT defines this intersection as southern terminus; former US 89 / SR 93
Santa Cruz	Nogales	0.28	0.17			West Street	At-grade intersection; south end of freeway; road continues as Compound Street
Santa Cruz	Nogales	0.71	0.44		1A	International Street	Southbound exit only
Santa Cruz	Nogales	1.90	1.18		1B	Western Avenue	Signed as exit 1 northbound
Santa Cruz	Nogales	4.76	2.96	2	4	SR 189 (Mariposa Road)	
Santa Cruz		8.55	5.31	5	8	BL 19 (Grand Avenue)	Southbound left exit and northbound entrance; former US 89 / SR 93
Santa Cruz	Rio Rico	12.42	7.72	7	12	SR 289 (Ruby Road)	
Santa Cruz	Rio Rico	17.53	10.89	10	17	Rio Rico Drive / Yavapai Drive	
Santa Cruz	Rio Rico	22.45	13.95	13	22	Peck Canyon Road	
Santa Cruz	Rio Rico	25.17	15.64	15	25	Palo Parado Road	
Santa Cruz	Tumacacori-Carmen	29.34	18.23	18	29	Tumacacori-Carmen	Tumacácori National Historical Park
Santa Cruz	Tubac	34.94	21.71	21	34	Tubac	
Santa Cruz	Tubac–Amado line	40.10	24.92	24	40	Chavez Siding Road	
Santa Cruz	Amado	42.84	26.62	27	42	Agua Linda Road	
Santa Cruz	Amado	48.39	30.07	30	48	Arivaca Road	
Pima	Green Valley	56.26	34.96	34	56	Canoa Road	
Pima	Green Valley	63.63	39.54	39	63	Continental Road	
Pima	Green Valley	65.74	40.85	40	65	Esperanza Boulevard	
Pima	Sahuarita	69.72	43.32	43	69	Duval Mine Road	Former US 89 / SR 93, I-19 BL; Titan Missile Museum
Pima	Sahuarita	75.48	46.90	46	75	Sahuarita Road	
Pima	San Xavier Indian Reservation	80.32	49.91	49	80	Pima Mine Road	Desert Diamond Casino, Tohono O'odham Nation
Pima	San Xavier Indian Reservation	87.98	54.67	54	87	Papago Road	Dead end, U-turn only
Pima	San Xavier Indian Reservation	92.04	57.19	56	92	San Xavier Road	Access to Mission San Xavier del Bac
Pima	Tucson	95.10	59.09	58	95	Valencia Road – Tucson	Tucson International Airport
Pima	Tucson	98.35	61.11		98	Irvington Road	
Pima	Tucson	99.97	62.12	61	99	SR 86 (Ajo Way)	
Pima	Tucson	101.63	63.15	—	101	I-10 east – El Paso	Northbound exit and southbound entrance; I-10 exit 260
Pima	Tucson	101.84	63.28		102	29th Street / 22nd Street / Silverlake Road / Starr Pass Boulevard	Northbound exit and southbound entrance
Pima	Tucson	102.08	63.43		—	I-10 west – Phoenix	Northern terminus; I-10 exit 260
1.000 mi = 1.609 km; 1.000 km = 0.621 mi: Incomplete access

== Business routes ==
Historically, I-19 has had two business loops, both of which are former sections of US 89, SR 93, and SR 789. One is currently active while the other is decommissioned. Both business loops are currently and formerly recognized under the unsigned designation Arizona State Route 19 Business (also known as State Business Route 19).

=== Nogales loop ===
Interstate 19 Business
- State Business Route 19 (1)
- Location: Nogales
- Length: 5.88 mi (9.46 km)
- Existed: 1992–present

A map of the Nogales business loop. The route is highlighted in red.

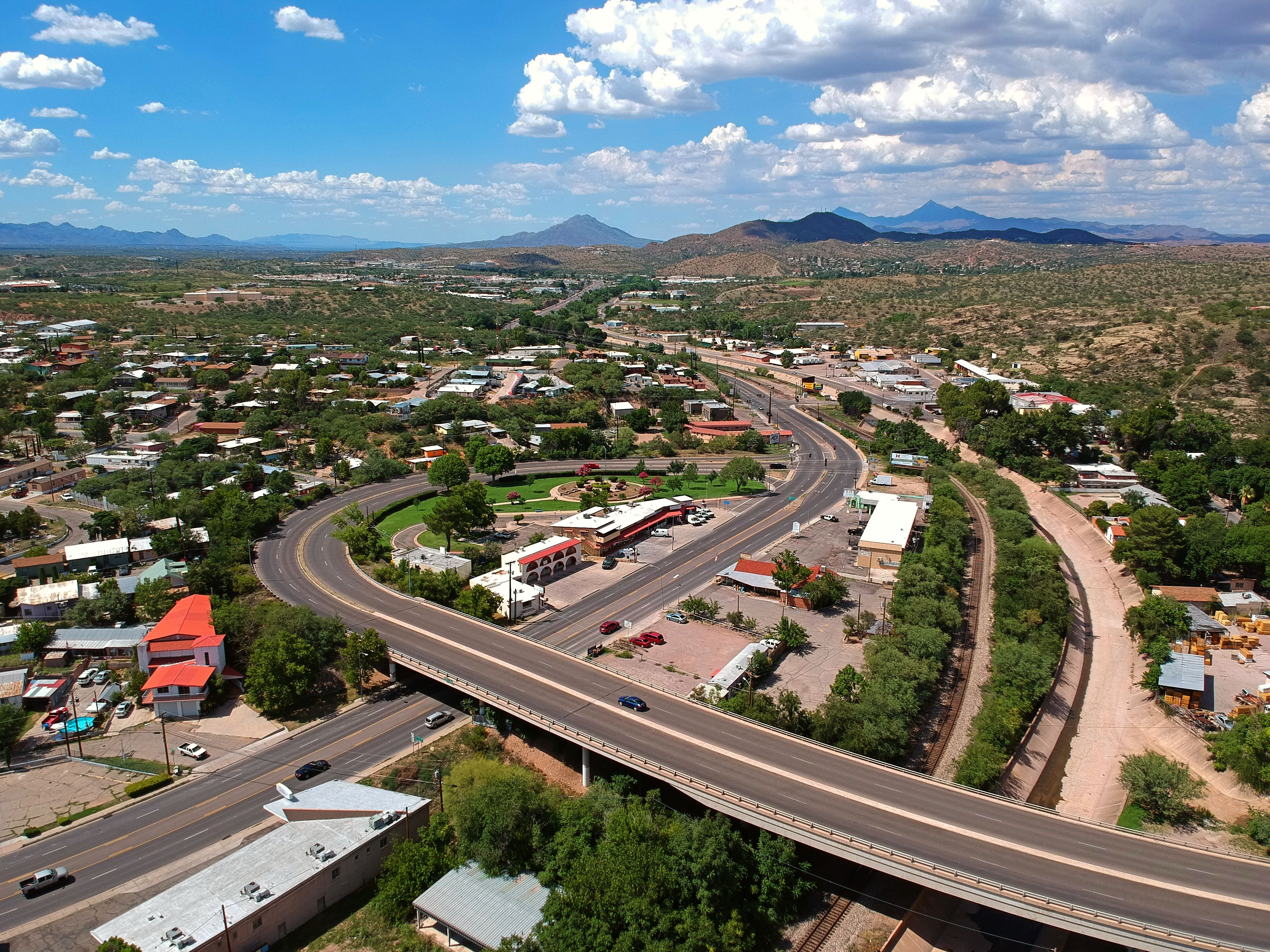
I-19 Bus. (Grand Avenue) junction with SR 82 in Nogales

Interstate 19 Business (I-19 Bus.) begins at the Mexican border in Nogales near the southern end of the Interstate. I-19 Bus. follows Grand Avenue in Nogales and has intersections with SR 82 and SR 189 before terminating at I-19 just north of Nogales. The route follows the former alignment of US 89, SR 93, and SR 789, back when all three highways traversed through southern Arizona. The route has been commissioned as I-19 Bus. since US 89 was decommissioned from southern Arizona in 1992.

Major intersections
The entire route is in Santa Cruz County.

Location	mi	km	Destinations	Notes
Nogales	0.00	0.00	Fed. 15 south – Mexico	Dennis DeConcini Port of Entry; international border with Mexico; continues south as Mexican Federal Highway 15
Nogales	0.14	0.23	I-19 north (Crawford Street) – Tucson	ADOT defines this intersection as southern terminus of I-19
Nogales	1.66	2.67	SR 82 east (Patagonia Highway) – Patagonia	
Nogales	2.77	4.46	SR 189 south (Mariposa Road) to I-19	
	5.88	9.46	I-19 north	Northern terminus; no access to I-19 south
1.000 mi = 1.609 km; 1.000 km = 0.621 mi: Incomplete access

=== Sahuarita–Tucson loop ===
Interstate 19 Business
- State Business Route 19 (2)
- Location: South Tucson–Green Valley
- Length: 20.24 mi (32.57 km)
- Existed: 1992–2004

A map of the Tucson business loop. The route is highlighted in red.

Interstate 19 Business (I-19 Bus.) began at I-19 exit 69 in Green Valley at West Duval Mine Road and South Nogales Highway. I-19 Bus. followed Nogales Highway north through unincorporated Pima County and Sahuarita into Tucson. In Tucson, I-19 Bus. curved from Nogales Highway onto South 6th Avenue where it served as the eastern terminus of SR 86 at West Ajo Way, before terminating at I-10 exit 261 and South 6th Avenue in South Tucson. The route follows the former alignment of US 89, SR 93, and SR 789, back when all three highways traversed through southern Arizona. The route was commissioned as I-19 Bus. since US 89 was decommissioned from southern Arizona in 1992. In 2002, the state handed maintenance of I-19 Bus. between Los Reales Road and I-10 to the city of Tucson. The rest of the route was handed over to Pima County and the city of Sahuarita in 2004. This also meant the designation was retired from the state highway system completely.

Major intersections
The entire route was in Pima County.

Location	mi	km	Destinations	Notes
Green Valley	43.88	70.62	I-19 / West Duval Mine Road – Nogales	Southern terminus; I-19 Exit 69; road continues west as West Duval Mine Road
Sahuarita	48.15	77.49	East Sahuarita Road to I-19	
Tucson	60.41	97.22	East Valencia Road to I-19 / I-10 / BL 10 – Tucson International Airport	
Tucson	63.50	102.19	SR 86 west (West Ajo Way) to I-19 / East Ajo Way – Ajo	Eastern terminus of SR 86
South Tucson	64.12	103.19	I-10 / South 6th Avenue – Casa Grande, El Paso	Northern terminus; I-10 Exit 261; road continues north as South 6th Avenue
1.000 mi = 1.609 km; 1.000 km = 0.621 mi

== See also ==
- List of Interstate Highways in Arizona
- Metrication in the United States
