= Nogales-Morley Gate Port of Entry =

Border crossing between Mexico and the U.S.

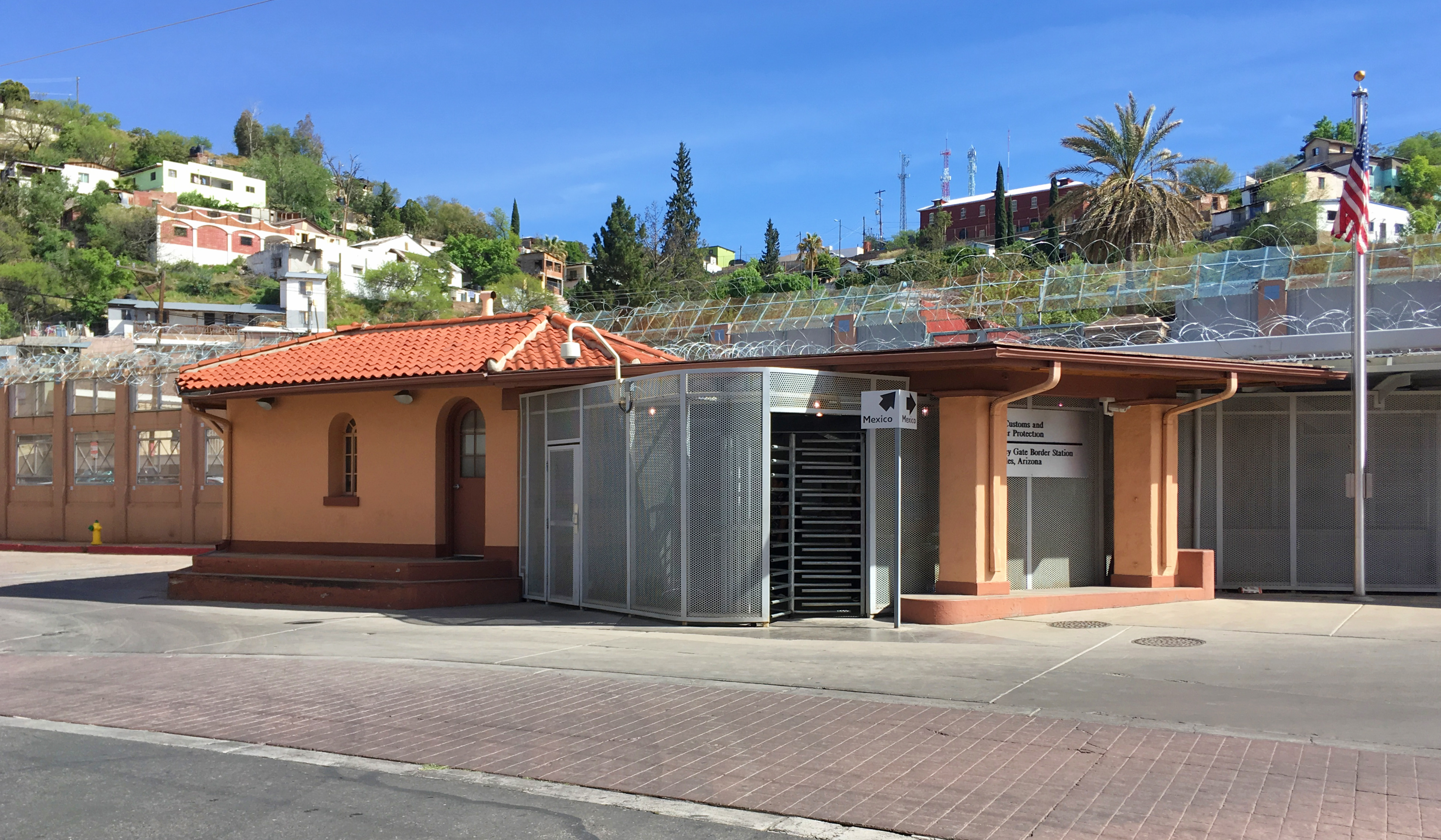
- Morley Gate Port of Entry as seen from the US side

Location
- Country: United States
- Location: Morley and International Blvd., Nogales, Arizona 85621
- Coordinates: 31.332750°N 110.941500°W

Details
- Opened: 1931

Statistics
- 2011 Cars: 0
- 2011 Trucks: 0
- Pedestrians: (not separately reported, but believed to be about 840,000).

Website
- http://www.cbp.gov/contact/ports/nogales

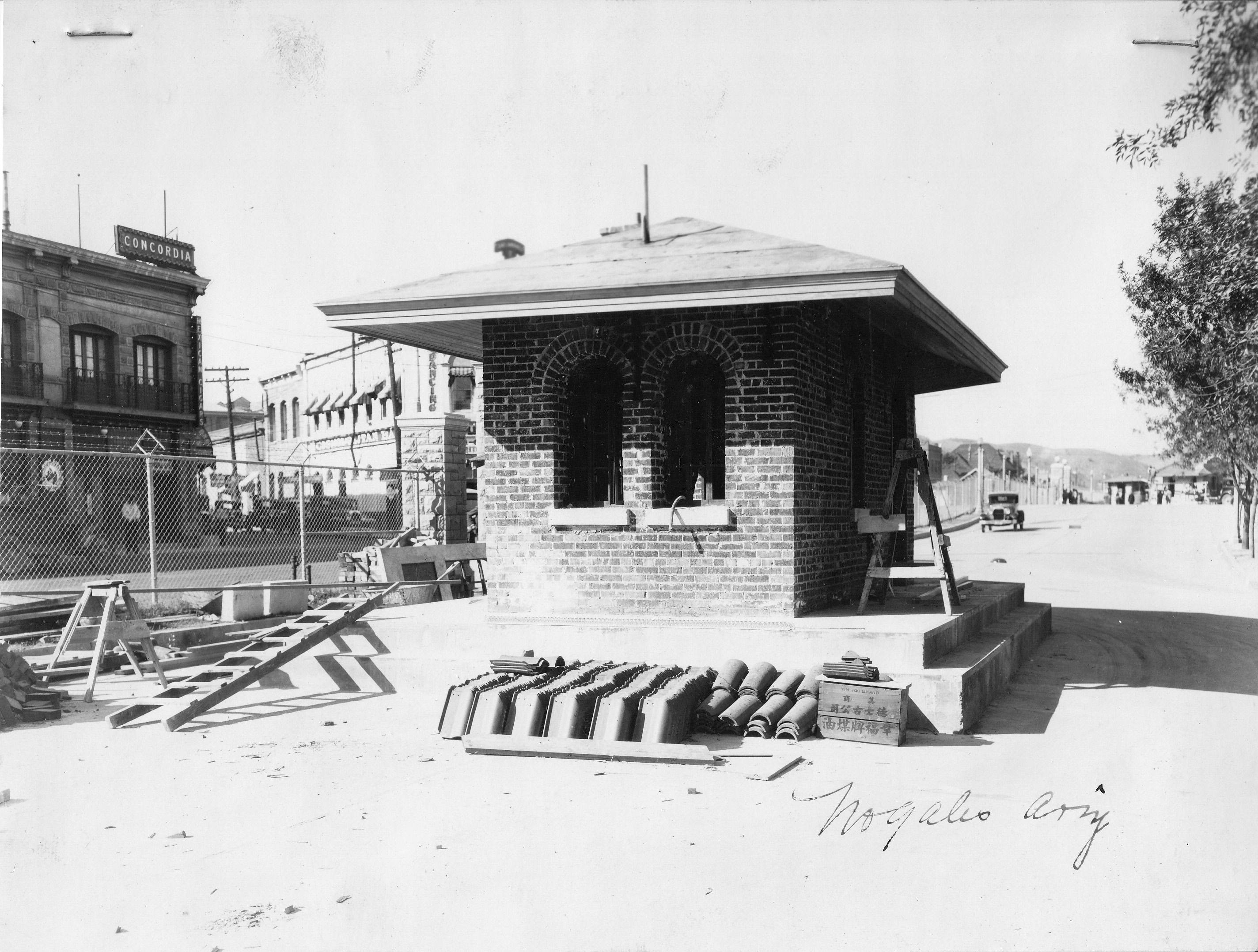
Morley Gate Garita as seen during construction in 1930

The Nogales Port of Entry evolved over time, rather than being planned. When an international fence divided Nogales in the early 20th century, vehicles were inspected at a gate at Grand Avenue, trains were inspected just east of there, and pedestrians were inspected further to the east at Morley Avenue. A small tile-roofed inspection station was completed in 1931 and was expanded in 1949. Substantial renovations were performed in 2011.

In 2011, the Morley Gate facility was renovated to improve throughput and to provide more space and better lighting. On busy days, over 10,000 people enter the United States through Morley Gate. It is one of five land border pedestrian-only crossing in the United States. Others include the Boquillas Port of Entry in Big Bend National Park in Texas, the Cross Border Xpress at Tijuana International Airport, the PedWest component of the San Ysidro Port of Entry, and Goat Haunt in Glacier National Park

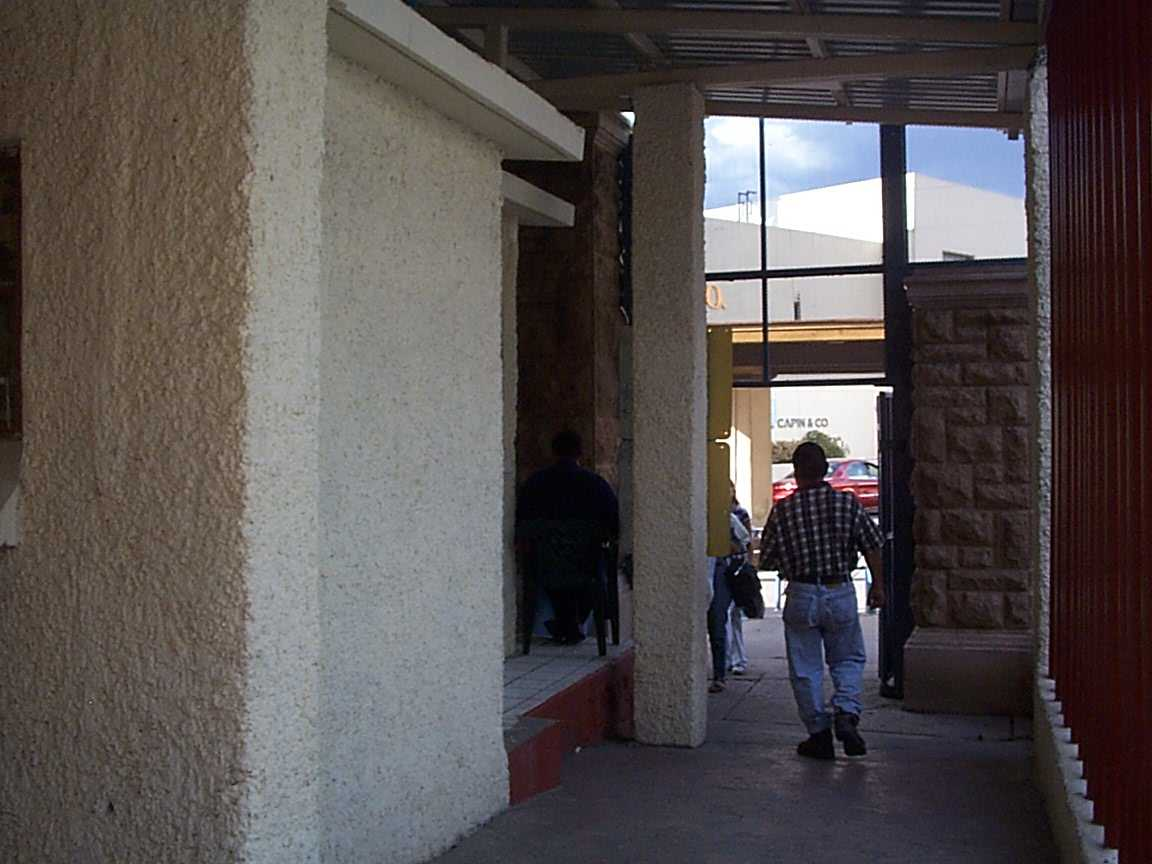
Entering the US through the Nogales-Morley Gate, October 2000

== See also ==
- List of Mexico–United States border crossings
