= Arizona State Route 189 =

State highway in Nogales, Arizona, United States

State Route 189
- Mariposa Road
- SR 189 highlighted in red

Route information
- Maintained by ADOT
- Length: 3.75 mi (6.04 km)
- Existed: 1956–present

Major junctions
- South end: Fed. 15D at the Mexican border in Nogales
- I-19 in Nogales
- North end: BL 19 in Nogales

Location
- Country: United States
- State: Arizona

Highway system
- Arizona State Highway System; Interstate; US; State; Scenic Proposed; Former
← SR 188	→ US 191

State Route 189 (SR 189) is a highway in Santa Cruz County, Arizona that runs from its junction with Interstate 19 to the US-Mexico Border. It is a north–south route for its entirety.

The highway is a portion of, and the southern terminus of the United States section of the CANAMEX Corridor, a trade corridor that stretches north from Mexico across the United States to the Canadian province of Alberta.

== Route description ==
SR 189 is a 3.75-mile (6.04 km) state highway that is completely within the city limits of Nogales. The southern terminus is the Nogales-Mariposa Port of Entry on the Mexico border. From the border, the highway heads north before curving towards the east to an interchange with I-19. SR 189 continues east from the interchange to its northern terminus at the I-19 Business Route. It also serves as a bypass route for truck traffic to and from Mexico, avoiding the busier border crossing at North Grand Ave in central Nogales.

== History ==
The route was originally established as a state highway in 1956, from Interstate 19 in Nogales to U.S. Route 89. In 1974, the route was formally established in the city of Nogales with its current routing from the Mexican border to I-19 Business. In 1979, the section east of I-19 was given to the county, but it was given to the city of Nogales instead in 1980.

In March 2018, plans were announced for improvements to the highway including additional overpasses and better access/exit ramps at the I-19 interchange to increase capacity. The project will be partly funded with $25 million from the US government, according to US Representative Martha McSally.

== Future ==
The Fixing America's Surface Transportation Act of 2015 formally designated I-11 throughout Arizona, which includes an upgraded SR 189 as part of the future highway's alignment. This alignment will bypass the cities of Nogales, Arizona and Nogales, Sonora and directly connects I-11 with a direct freeway connection to the United States-Mexican Border with Mexican Federal Highway 15D.

== Junction list ==
The entire route is in Nogales, Santa Cruz County.

mi	km	Destinations	Notes
0.01	0.016	Fed. 15D south	United States-Mexico border; continuation into Mexico
2.97	4.78	I-19 – Tucson, International Border	I-19 exit 4
3.75	6.04	BL 19 (Grand Avenue)	Northern terminus; continues east as Calle Sonora
1.000 mi = 1.609 km; 1.000 km = 0.621 mi: Tolled
