= Nogales International Airport (United States) =

Airport in Santa Cruz County, Arizona

- IATA: OLS; ICAO: KOLS; FAA LID: OLS

Summary
- Airport type: Public
- Owner: Santa Cruz County
- Serves: Nogales, Arizona
- Elevation AMSL: 3,955 ft / 1,205 m
- Coordinates: 31°25′04″N 110°50′52″W
- Website: www.santacruzcountyaz.gov/Nogales-International-Airport

Map

Runways
Direction	Length		Surface
Direction	ft	m	Surface
3/21	7,200	2,195	Asphalt

Helipads
Number	Length		Surface
Number	ft	m	Surface
H1	97	30	Concrete

Statistics
- Aircraft operations (2017): 46,850
- Based aircraft (2019): 19
- Source: Federal Aviation Administration

Nogales International Airport (IATA: OLS, ICAO: KOLS, FAA LID: OLS) is a county-owned public-use airport located 8 miles (7.0 nmi; 13 km) northeast of the central business district of Nogales, a city in Santa Cruz County, Arizona, United States and is also a port of entry into the United States. It is included in the Federal Aviation Administration (FAA) National Plan of Integrated Airport Systems for 2019–2023, in which it is categorized as a local general aviation facility. It is not served by any commercial passenger airlines as of June 2014.

== Facilities and aircraft ==
Nogales International Airport covers an area of 340 acres (140 ha) at an elevation of 3,955 feet (1,205 m) above mean sea level. It has one runway designated 4/22 with an asphalt surface measuring is 7,200 by 100 feet (2,195 x 30 m). It also has one helipad designated H1 with a concrete surface measuring 97 by 97 feet (30 x 30 m).

For the 12-month period ending April 17, 2017, the airport had 46,850 aircraft operations, an average of 128 per day: 87% general aviation, 9% military, and 4% air taxi. In February 2019, there were 19 aircraft based at this airport: 12 single-engine and 7 multi-engine.

== Airlines and destinations ==
=== Cargo ===
Airlines	Destinations
Ameriflight	Phoenix-Sky Harbor, Tucson

== See also ==
- List of airports in Arizona
