= Nogales, Arizona =

City in Arizona, United States

- City
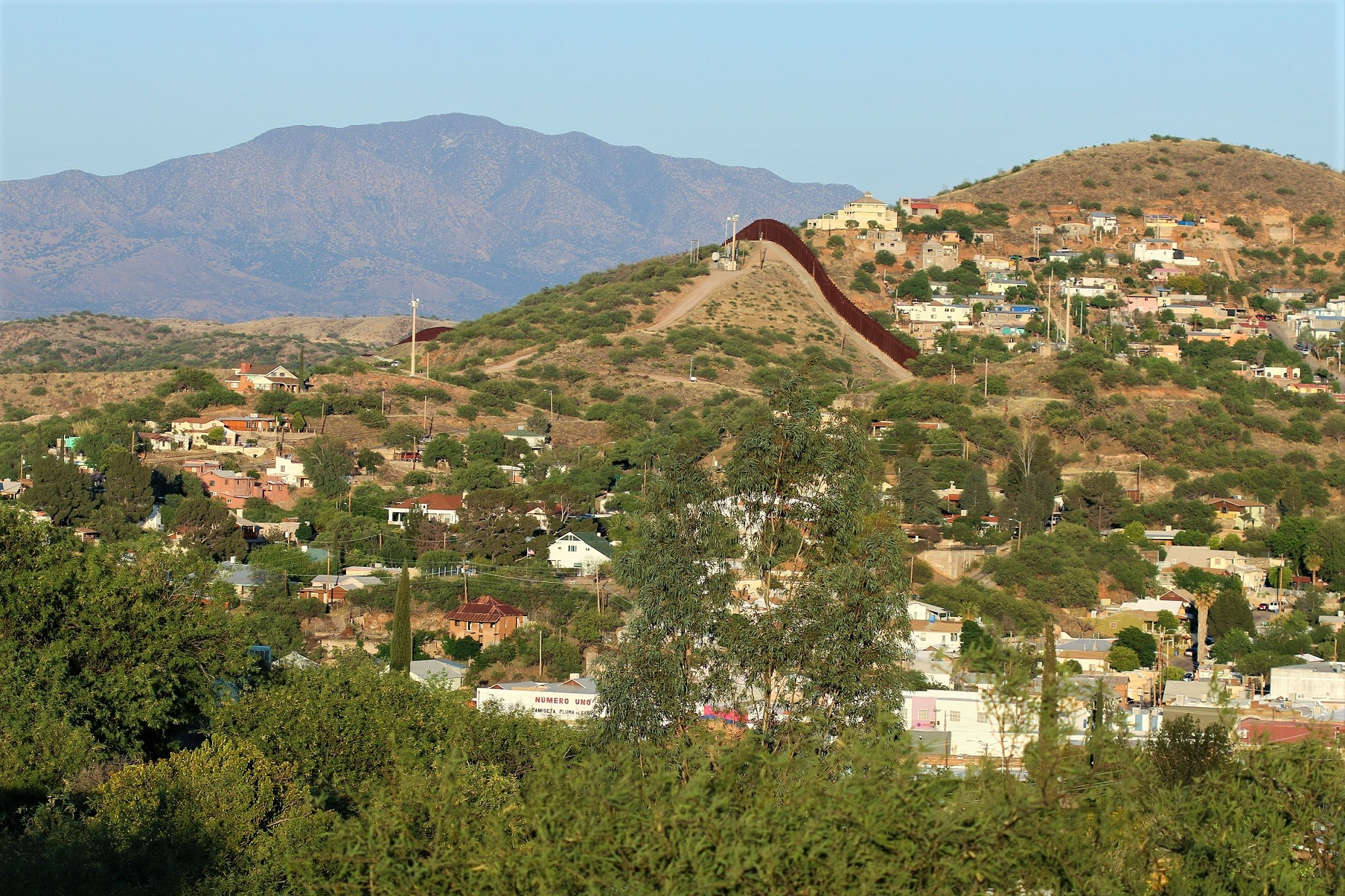
- The view of Nogales

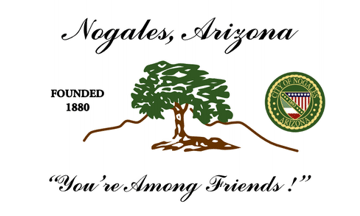
- Flag Seal

- Location of Nogales in Santa Cruz County, Arizona

- Location in Arizona Location in the United States
- Coordinates: 31°20′25″N 110°56′03″W
- Country: United States
- State: Arizona
- County: Santa Cruz
- Incorporated: 1893

Government
  - Type: Council-manager
  - Body: Nogales City Council
  - Mayor: Jorge Maldonado
  - Vice Mayor: Hector Bojorquez
  - City Manager: Joel Kramer
  - City Council: List: • Hector Bojorquez; • Liza Montiel; • Saulo Bonilla; • John Doyle; • Esther Melendez-Lopez; • Anna Parada

Area
  - Total: 20.83 sq mi (53.96 km^{2})
  - Land: 20.82 sq mi (53.92 km^{2})
  - Water: 0.015 sq mi (0.04 km^{2})
- Elevation: 3,829 ft (1,167 m)

Population (2026)
  - Total: 20,072
  - Estimate: 20,072
  - Density: 949.6/sq mi (366.63/km^{2})
- Time zone: UTC-07:00 (MST)
- ZIP codes: 85621
- Area code: 520
- FIPS code: 04-49640
- GNIS feature ID: 32336
- Website: www.nogalesaz.gov

Nogales (Spanish pronunciation: [noˈɣales]; English: /nəˈɡɑːlɪs/ or /noʊˈɡɑːleɪs/) is a city in and the county seat of Santa Cruz County, Arizona, United States. As of 2026, the population of Nogales is 20,072. Nogales forms part of the larger Tucson–Nogales combined statistical area, with a total population of 1,027,683 as of the 2010 Census.

Nogales forms Arizona's largest transborder agglomeration with its adjacent, much larger twin Nogales, Sonora, across the Mexican border. The southern terminus of Interstate 19 is located in Nogales at the U.S.–Mexico border; the highway continues south into Mexico as Mexico Federal Highway 15. The highways meeting in Nogales are a major road intersection in the CANAMEX Corridor, connecting Canada, the United States, and Mexico. Nogales also is the beginning of the Arizona Sun Corridor, an economically important trade region stretching from Nogales to Prescott, including the Tucson and Phoenix metropolitan areas.

Nogales is home to four international ports of entry, including the Morley Pedestrian Port of Entry, Dennis Deconcini Pedestrian and Passenger Vehicle Port of Entry, Union Pacific rail, Nogales International Airport, and the Mariposa Port of Entry. The Nogales-Mariposa Port of Entry has twelve passenger vehicle inspection lanes and eight commercial inspection lanes.

Due to its location on the border and its major ports of entry, Nogales funnels an estimated $30 billion worth of international trade into Arizona and the United States, per year, in fresh produce and manufactured goods from Mexico and the world through the deep sea port in Guaymas, Sonora, Mexico. This trade helps to support tens of thousands of jobs and the overall economies in Ambos Nogales and throughout the American state of Arizona and the Mexican state of Sonora.

The town is named for the black walnut trees which once grew abundantly in the mountain pass between the cities of Nogales, Arizona, and Nogales, Sonora, and can still be found around the town.

== History ==
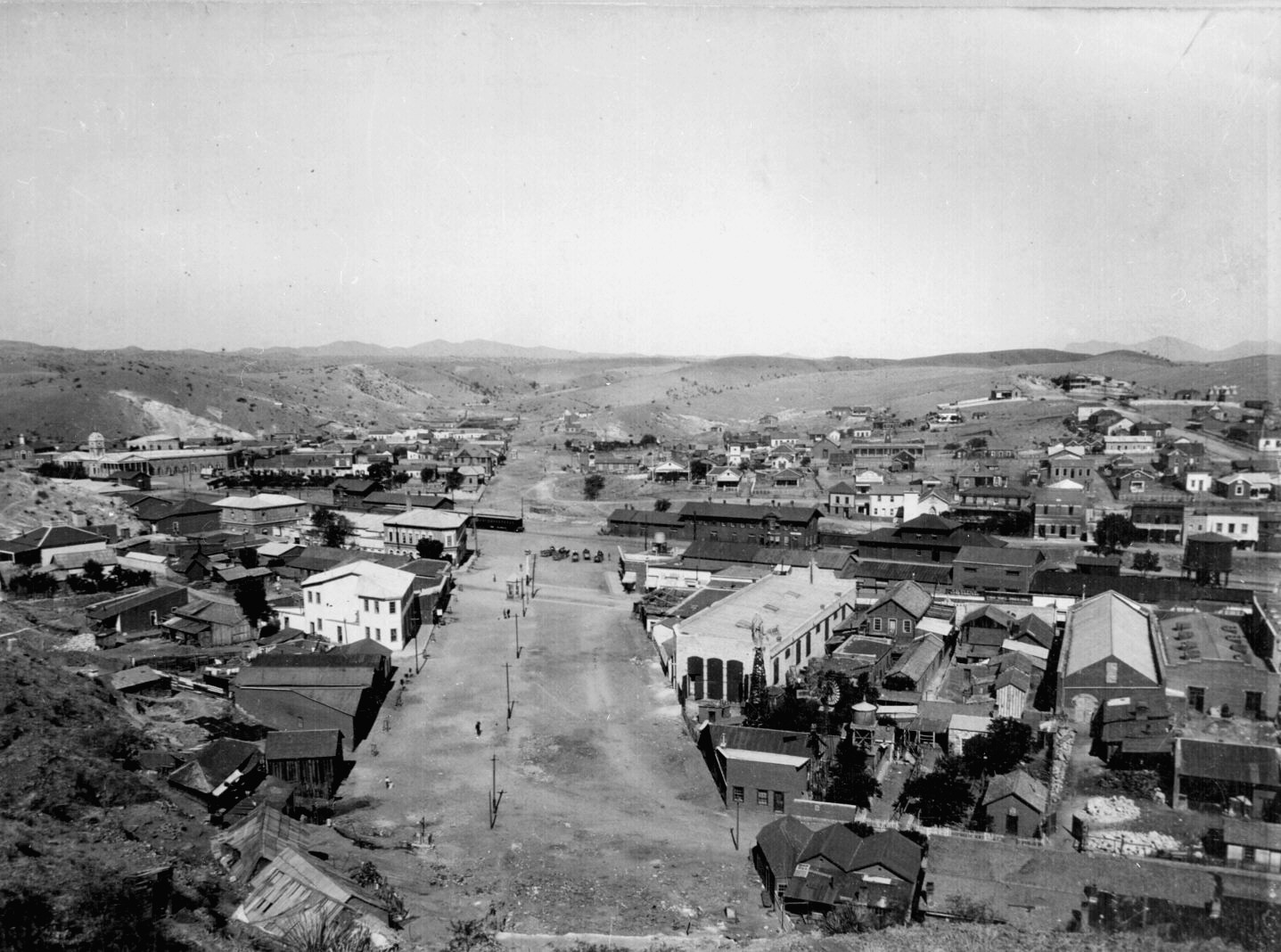
The boundary between Nogales, Arizona, in the United States, on the right, and Nogales, Sonora, in Mexico, on the left, running down the center of a wide avenue, about 1899

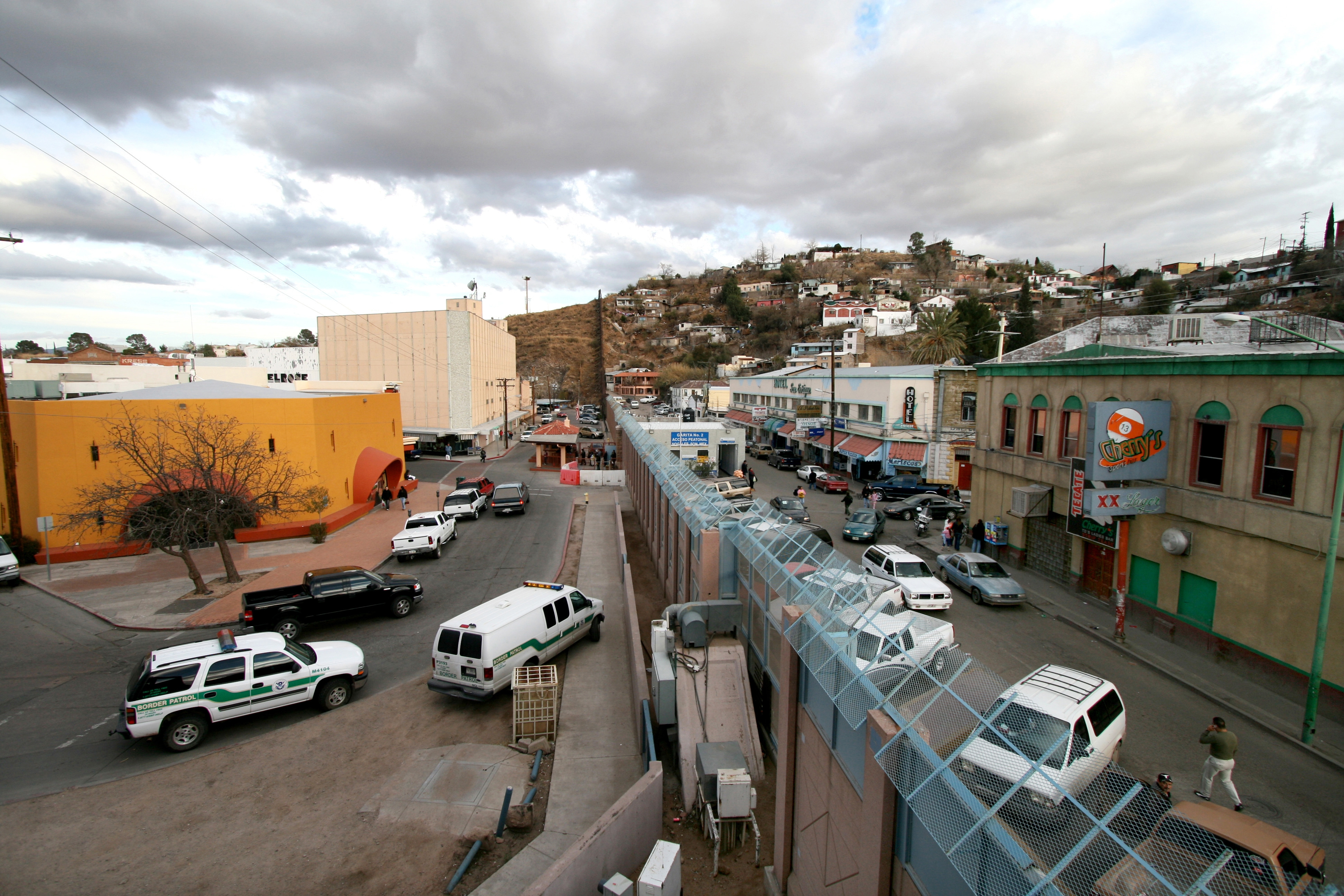
Similar picture of the border from the opposite direction, 2007

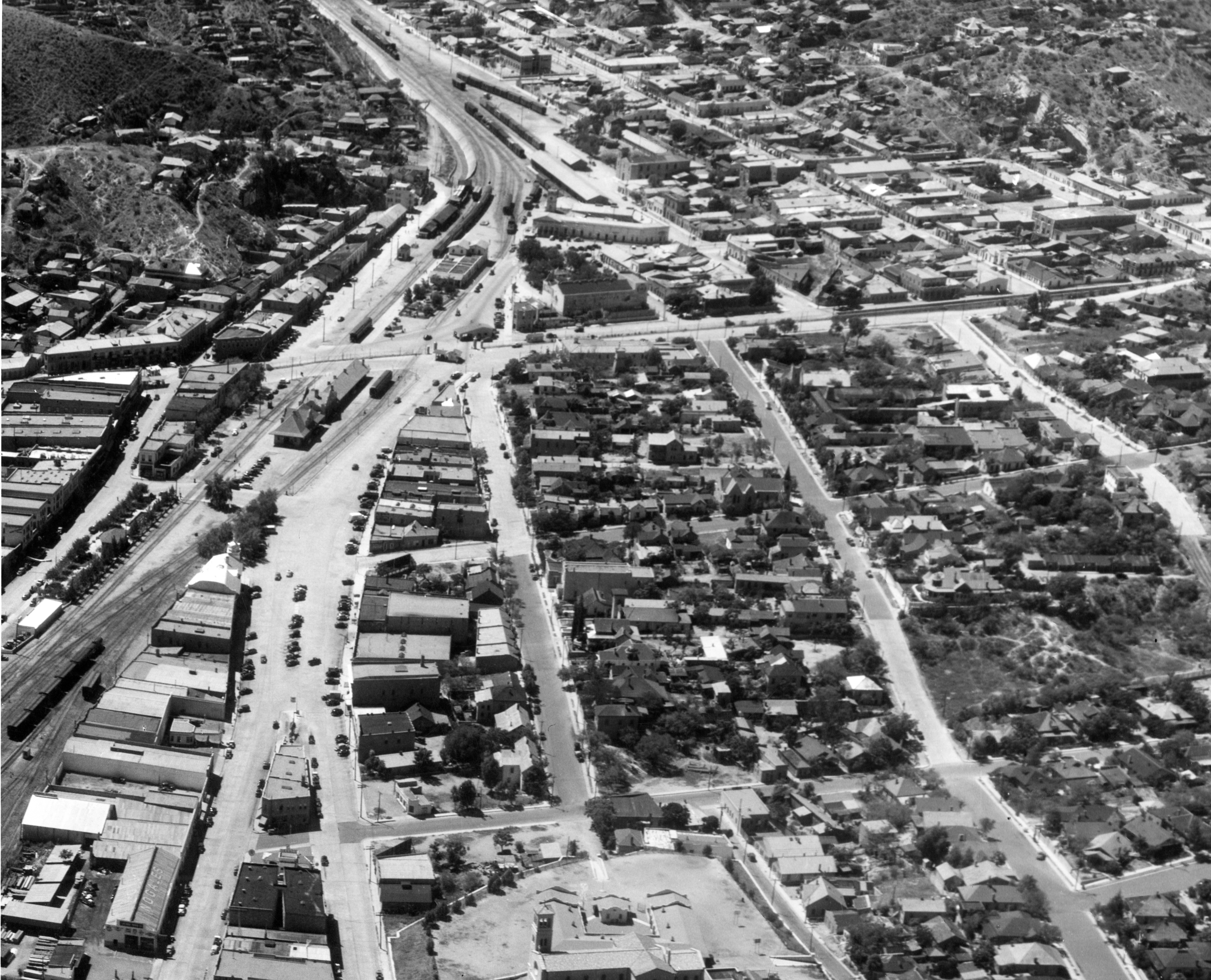
View of Nogales, 1940s

The name Nogales is derived from the Spanish word for 'walnut' or 'walnut tree'. It refers to the large stands of walnut trees that once stood in the mountain pass where Nogales is located.

Nogales was at the beginning of the 1775–1776 Juan Bautista de Anza Expedition as it entered the present-day U.S. from New Spain, and the town is now on the Juan Bautista de Anza National Historic Trail. On the second floor of the 1904 Nogales Courthouse is a small room dedicated to the 1775–1776 Anza Expedition.

In 1841, a land grant from the Mexican government to the Elías family established Los Nogales de Elías. Following the Gadsden Purchase in 1853, Nogales became a part of the United States of America. In 1880, Russian-Jewish immigrants Isaac and Jacob Isaacson homesteaded the trading post of Isaacson, Arizona, at present-day Nogales. The U.S. Postal Service opened the Isaacson post office but renamed it as Nogales in 1883.

In 1915, according to historian David Leighton, Sonora Gov. Jose M. Maytorena ordered the construction of an 11-wire fence, separating Nogales, Sonora from Nogales, Arizona, but it was taken down four months later.

On August 27, 1918, a battle between United States Army forces and Mexican militia – mostly civilian in composition – took place. Culminating as the result of a decade's worth of tensions originating from the Mexican Revolution and earlier battles in Nogales along the border in 1913 and 1915, the main consequence of the 1918 violence saw the building of the first permanent border wall between Nogales, Arizona, and Nogales, Sonora, along the previously unobstructed boundary line on International Street.

== Demographics ==
Historical population
Census	Pop.	Note	%±
1890	1,194		—
1900	1,761		47.5%
1910	3,514		99.5%
1920	5,199		48.0%
1930	6,006		15.5%
1940	5,135		−14.5%
1950	6,153		19.8%
1960	7,286		18.4%
1970	8,946		22.8%
1980	15,683		75.3%
1990	19,489		24.3%
2000	20,878		7.1%
2010	20,837		−0.2%
2020	19,770		−5.1%
U.S. Decennial Census

=== Racial and ethnic composition ===
Racial composition
Race (NH = Non-Hispanic)	% 2020	% 2010	% 2000	Pop. 2020	Pop. 2010	Pop. 2000
White Alone (NH)	3.3%	3.9%	5.5%	645	803	1,139
Black Alone (NH)	0.2%	0.1%	0.2%	42	28	38
American Indian Alone (NH)	0.1%	0.2%	0.2%	18	48	38
Asian Alone (NH)	0.6%	0.6%	0.3%	115	125	65
Pacific Islander Alone (NH)	0%	0%	0%	1	1	4
Other Race Alone (NH)	0.3%	0%	0.1%	64	8	19
Multiracial (NH)	0.3%	0.1%	0.2%	55	31	36
Hispanic (Any race)	95.2%	95%	93.6%	18,830	19,793	19,539

=== 2020 census ===
As of the 2020 census, Nogales had a population of 19,770. The median age was 37.4 years. 27.7% of residents were under the age of 18 and 19.6% of residents were 65 years of age or older. For every 100 females there were 85.4 males, and for every 100 females age 18 and over there were 79.1 males age 18 and over.

93.6% of residents lived in urban areas, while 6.4% lived in rural areas.

There were 6,896 households in Nogales, of which 39.0% had children under the age of 18 living in them. Of all households, 41.8% were married-couple households, 16.1% were households with a male householder and no spouse or partner present, and 38.0% were households with a female householder and no spouse or partner present. About 25.2% of all households were made up of individuals and 13.6% had someone living alone who was 65 years of age or older.

There were 7,562 housing units, of which 8.8% were vacant. The homeowner vacancy rate was 2.0% and the rental vacancy rate was 7.2%.

Racial composition as of the 2020 census
Race	Number	Percent
White	4,758	24.1%
Black or African American	69	0.3%
American Indian and Alaska Native	169	0.9%
Asian	132	0.7%
Native Hawaiian and Other Pacific Islander	1	0.0%
Some other race	6,139	31.1%
Two or more races	8,502	43.0%
Hispanic or Latino (of any race)	18,830	95.2%

=== 2000 census ===
As of the 2000 census, there were 20,878 people, 5,985 households, and 4,937 families residing in the city. The population density was 1,002.1 inhabitants per square mile (386.9/km^{2}). There were 6,501 housing units at an average density of 312.0/sq mi (120.5/km^{2}). The racial makeup of the city was 71.7% White, 0.4% Black or African American, 0.6% Native American, 0.6% Asian, 0.0% Pacific Islander, 24.3% from other races, and 2.4% from two or more races. 95.0% of the population were Hispanic or Latino of any race.

There were 6,362 households, out of which 38.8% had children under the age of 18 living with them, 47.9% were married couples living together, 24.2% had a female householder with no husband present, and 22.5% were non-families. 15.1% of all households were made up of individuals, and 9.9% had someone living alone who was 65 years of age or older. The average household size was 3.12 and the average family size was 3.62.

In the city, the population was spread out, with 34.6% under the age of 18, 9.5% from 18 to 24, 25.5% from 25 to 44, 19.5% from 45 to 64, and 10.8% who were 65 years of age or older. The median age was 30 years. For every 100 females, there were 88.1 males. For every 100 females age 18 and over, there were 81.3 males.

The median income for a household in the city was $28,044, and the median income for a family was $24,637. Males had a median income of $24,636 versus $18,403 for females. The per capita income for the city was $14,440. About 30.8% of families and 32.7% of the population were below the poverty line, including 41.2% of those under age 18 and 32.9% of those age 65 or over.

== Geography ==
According to the United States Census Bureau, the city has a total area of 20.8 sq mi (54 km^{2}), all land.

The city is at an elevation of 3,829 ft (1,167 m).

=== Climate ===
Nogales has a semi-arid steppe climate (Köppen BSh/BSk), which is less hot and more rainy than a typical arid climate such as Phoenix. In the winter months, Nogales averages daily maximum temperatures in the mid to upper 60s, with December averaging daily highs of around 65 °F (18 °C). Lows typically settle just above the freezing mark (32 °F or 0 °C) on a majority of nights, but it is not uncommon to see temperatures tumble below 25 °F (−4 °C) on some winter nights.

On the other hand, in the summer months, highs average between 90 and 100 °F (32 and 38 °C), with the month of June being the hottest with an average daytime high of 97 °F (36 °C). Nighttime lows for the summer months remain in the lower to mid 60s for the duration of the season. The Arizona Monsoon generally runs through July and August, and these months typically see eight inches or more of combined rainfall, which brings the average annual precipitation for Nogales to about 15 in (380 mm). Some monsoon season storms are capable of producing several inches of rain in a short amount of time, creating flash flood hazards.

At the Nogales 6 N station, the all-time highest recorded temperature was 112 °F (44 °C), which was reached on June 26, 1990. The lowest recorded temperature was −4 °F (−20 °C) on December 8, 1978.

Climate data for Nogales, Arizona (Nogales International Airport) (1991–2020 normals, extremes 1999–present)
Month	Jan	Feb	Mar	Apr	May	Jun	Jul	Aug	Sep	Oct	Nov	Dec	Year
Record high °F (°C)	82 (28)	88 (31)	91 (33)	98 (37)	106 (41)	112 (44)	110 (43)	107 (42)	106 (41)	100 (38)	91 (33)	83 (28)	112 (44)
Mean maximum °F (°C)	77.3 (25.2)	80.5 (26.9)	86.5 (30.3)	91.3 (32.9)	97.7 (36.5)	105.3 (40.7)	102.9 (39.4)	100.2 (37.9)	97.7 (36.5)	93.0 (33.9)	85.7 (29.8)	78.8 (26.0)	106.2 (41.2)
Mean daily maximum °F (°C)	65.8 (18.8)	67.6 (19.8)	73.3 (22.9)	79.4 (26.3)	87.7 (30.9)	96.9 (36.1)	94.1 (34.5)	92.2 (33.4)	90.3 (32.4)	83.1 (28.4)	73.3 (22.9)	64.9 (18.3)	80.7 (27.1)
Daily mean °F (°C)	50.0 (10.0)	51.7 (10.9)	56.8 (13.8)	61.9 (16.6)	69.9 (21.1)	79.6 (26.4)	80.5 (26.9)	78.9 (26.1)	75.4 (24.1)	66.3 (19.1)	56.7 (13.7)	49.4 (9.7)	64.8 (18.2)
Mean daily minimum °F (°C)	34.1 (1.2)	35.9 (2.2)	40.3 (4.6)	44.4 (6.9)	52.1 (11.2)	62.4 (16.9)	66.9 (19.4)	65.6 (18.7)	60.5 (15.8)	49.5 (9.7)	40.1 (4.5)	33.9 (1.1)	48.8 (9.3)
Mean minimum °F (°C)	21.2 (−6.0)	23.1 (−4.9)	29.1 (−1.6)	33.5 (0.8)	41.8 (5.4)	53.3 (11.8)	61.8 (16.6)	60.3 (15.7)	52.1 (11.2)	37.7 (3.2)	28.7 (−1.8)	21.6 (−5.8)	18.1 (−7.7)
Record low °F (°C)	10 (−12)	11 (−12)	22 (−6)	28 (−2)	33 (1)	48 (9)	53 (12)	52 (11)	43 (6)	24 (−4)	20 (−7)	14 (−10)	10 (−12)
Average precipitation inches (mm)	0.84 (21)	0.78 (20)	0.63 (16)	0.28 (7.1)	0.15 (3.8)	0.54 (14)	4.18 (106)	3.41 (87)	1.53 (39)	0.65 (17)	0.62 (16)	1.01 (26)	14.62 (371)
Average precipitation days (≥ 0.01 in)	4.1	3.9	2.8	1.6	1.1	3.2	15.1	14.0	6.6	3.4	2.5	4.3	62.6
Source 1: NOAA
Source 2: National Weather Service (mean maxima/minima 2006–2020)

Climate data for Nogales 6 N, Arizona (1991–2020 normals, extremes 1952–present)
Month	Jan	Feb	Mar	Apr	May	Jun	Jul	Aug	Sep	Oct	Nov	Dec	Year
Record high °F (°C)	85 (29)	89 (32)	95 (35)	99 (37)	107 (42)	112 (44)	109 (43)	108 (42)	105 (41)	101 (38)	93 (34)	84 (29)	112 (44)
Mean maximum °F (°C)	77.4 (25.2)	79.7 (26.5)	85.2 (29.6)	91.5 (33.1)	98.4 (36.9)	104.7 (40.4)	103.5 (39.7)	100.5 (38.1)	97.7 (36.5)	93.9 (34.4)	85.2 (29.6)	77.6 (25.3)	105.7 (40.9)
Mean daily maximum °F (°C)	65.3 (18.5)	67.2 (19.6)	72.8 (22.7)	79.4 (26.3)	87.4 (30.8)	96.5 (35.8)	94.4 (34.7)	92.3 (33.5)	90.5 (32.5)	83.5 (28.6)	73.4 (23.0)	64.6 (18.1)	80.6 (27.0)
Daily mean °F (°C)	46.8 (8.2)	48.8 (9.3)	53.9 (12.2)	59.4 (15.2)	66.9 (19.4)	76.4 (24.7)	79.8 (26.6)	78.2 (25.7)	74.0 (23.3)	64.1 (17.8)	53.9 (12.2)	46.3 (7.9)	62.4 (16.9)
Mean daily minimum °F (°C)	28.3 (−2.1)	30.5 (−0.8)	35.0 (1.7)	39.5 (4.2)	46.3 (7.9)	56.3 (13.5)	65.3 (18.5)	64.0 (17.8)	57.5 (14.2)	44.6 (7.0)	34.4 (1.3)	28.0 (−2.2)	44.1 (6.7)
Mean minimum °F (°C)	18.6 (−7.4)	20.8 (−6.2)	25.3 (−3.7)	29.4 (−1.4)	36.2 (2.3)	45.1 (7.3)	56.4 (13.6)	57.6 (14.2)	47.9 (8.8)	32.8 (0.4)	22.5 (−5.3)	17.9 (−7.8)	15.1 (−9.4)
Record low °F (°C)	8 (−13)	9 (−13)	13 (−11)	16 (−9)	25 (−4)	34 (1)	44 (7)	40 (4)	30 (−1)	19 (−7)	8 (−13)	−4 (−20)	−4 (−20)
Average precipitation inches (mm)	0.98 (25)	0.92 (23)	0.69 (18)	0.35 (8.9)	0.17 (4.3)	0.68 (17)	3.59 (91)	3.91 (99)	2.23 (57)	0.85 (22)	0.59 (15)	1.14 (29)	16.10 (409)
Average snowfall inches (cm)	0.3 (0.76)	0.0 (0.0)	0.0 (0.0)	0.0 (0.0)	0.0 (0.0)	0.0 (0.0)	0.0 (0.0)	0.0 (0.0)	0.0 (0.0)	0.0 (0.0)	0.0 (0.0)	0.0 (0.0)	0.3 (0.76)
Average precipitation days (≥ 0.01 in)	4.8	4.8	3.5	1.6	1.4	2.3	14.2	13.7	7.0	3.2	3.2	5.5	65.2
Average snowy days (≥ 0.1 in)	0.0	0.0	0.0	0.0	0.0	0.0	0.0	0.0	0.0	0.0	0.0	0.1	0.1
Source 1: NOAA
Source 2: National Weather Service

== Economy ==
The economy of Nogales is heavily dependent on the cross-border trade through its Ports of Entry by produce distributors and American-based manufacturing plants in Nogales, Sonora and throughout the rest of the Mexican states of Sonora and Sinaloa. Most of Nogales' economy is based on agribusiness and produce distributors, which comes from large farms in the Mexican agri-belt. Despite its small population, Nogales actually receives much patronage from its bordering sister-city, Nogales, Sonora, Mexico. Most observers guess the population of Nogales, Sonora, at roughly 300,000. International commerce is a big part of Nogales' economy. More than 60 percent of Nogales' sales tax comes from the estimated 30,000 Mexican shoppers crossing the border daily. Nogales, Arizona, and Nogales, Sonora, are home to one of the largest maquiladora clusters. This enables American manufacturing plants on both sides of the border to take advantage of favorable wage and operating costs and excellent transportation and distribution networks.

The Consulate-General of Mexico in Nogales is located on 135 W. Cardwell St.

The United States Department of Homeland Security is a major economic driver in the Ambos Nogales region, with thousands of employees working for both the Border Patrol and Customs and Border Protection. Due to the large federal, state, and local police presence, Nogales has one of the highest police per-capita levels in the United States.

The largest employers in Nogales are:

- Seattle Sports
- City of Nogales
- County of Santa Cruz
- Dependable Home Health
- E.D.S. Manufacturing
- Holy Cross Hospital
- The Home Depot
- Mariposa Community Health Center
- Nogales Unified School District
- Safeway
- Prestolite Wire
- UPS Supply Chain Solutions
- Walmart

It has a significant cross-border dynamic with the city of Nogales in Sonora, Mexico, sharing not only its name but also activities such as tourist crossings and economic exchange.

== Arts and culture ==
The county of Santa Cruz and the city of Nogales have 200 properties listed in the National Register of Historic Sites, including Tumacacori National Monument first visited by Father Eusebio Kino in 1691 and Tubac Presidio, established by the Spanish in 1752 on an Indian village site. Others include the Old Tubac Schoolhouse, Old Nogales City Hall, Santa Cruz County Courthouse, and Patagonia Railroad Depot. The Patagonia-Sonoita Creek Sanctuary, 19 miles east, attracts worldwide visitors to see its diverse bird life. It is also host to ghost towns and mining camps, curio shops, first-class restaurants and night clubs.

The Santa Cruz County Historical Courthouse on Morley Street/Court Street has the statue of Lady Justice on top of the building. The Nogales version of Lady Justice is not wearing a blindfold.

Interesting architecture and historical homes along Crawford and Court Streets provide a glimpse of border life at its peak during that time period. A day trip to old Nogales, Sonora reveals many of the same architectural uniqueness.

Several state parks and recreation areas are located close to Nogales, including Patagonia State Park, Peña Blanca Lake, Parker Canyon Lake, and Coronado National Forest. The Wine Country of Sonoita-Elgin is also located 20 miles east of Nogales.

== Government ==
The City of Nogales operates under a council-manager form of government in which the mayor is elected to a 4-year term and has a single vote on the city council. The council then hires a city manager to run the day-to-day operations of the city. The 6 city council members are elected at-large to 4-year terms.

== Transportation ==
Nogales is located at the south end of Interstate 19. Arizona State Route 189 connects Interstate 19 with the Nogales-Mariposa Port of Entry and Mexican Federal Highway 15. Arizona State Route 82 connects Nogales with Patagonia and Sonoita. Interstate 11 is proposed to replace I-19, terminating in Nogales.

Santa Cruz County operates the Nogales International Airport, a general use airport.

Local bus transportation in Nogales is currently provided by local companies. Private bus companies Greyhound and TUFESA, as well as several shuttle companies, connect Nogales with Tucson and points north.

Rail transportation is provided by the Union Pacific Railroad (formerly the Southern Pacific Railroad) north to Tucson.

== In popular culture ==
Many dozens of motion pictures have been filmed around the Nogales area. The Hangover Part III (2013) was partially filmed in Nogales during late 2012. Parts of town were decorated to appear to be Tijuana, Mexico. Dog (2022) was partially set in Nogales, as the location for the funeral scene at the end, although these scenes were filmed in Los Angeles, California.

Georges Simenon's novel The Bottom of the Bottle is set in Nogales. A small part of William Gibson's short story, "The Gernsback Continuum" refers to the city of Nogales. It is also mentioned as a border crossing point in Carlos Castaneda's Don Juan series, and a gateway into the Mexican Yaqui communities of Sonora.

Nogales is discussed at length in the popular political economics book Why Nations Fail, comparing the relative success of Nogales, Arizona, to the poverty of Nogales, Sonora.

Oscar winner Benicio del Toro dedicated his award to Ambos Nogales during his acceptance speech at the 73rd Annual Academy Awards in 2001.

== Notable people ==
- Bob Baffert – 2015 & 2018 Triple Crown winner, champion horse breeder and trainer
- Andrew Leo Bettwy – Arizona State Land Commissioner 1970–78
- Movita Castaneda – Actress best known for being the second wife of actor Marlon Brando
- Travis Edmonson – Member of 1960's influential folk duo "Bud & Travis"
- Adrian Fontes – 22nd and current Secretary of State of Arizona since 2023
- John Frederick "Jack" Hannah – Academy Award-winning Disney Studios artist and director
- Gil Heredia – 10-year Major League Baseball pitcher and University of Arizona Sports Hall of Fame member, born 1965.
- Christine McIntyre – Actress, starred in 22 feature films, most notably as supporting character in Three Stooges films
- Charles Mingus – Jazz bass player, composer, and bandleader
- Jack O'Connor – Longtime firearms editor for Outdoor Life magazine
- Alberto Alvaro Ríos – Author, poet, won the 1981 Walt Whitman award for "Whispering to Fool the Wind", current State of Arizona Poet Laureate.
- Roger Smith – Actor, star of 77 Sunset Strip, husband to movie star Ann-Margret.
- Verita Bouvaire-Thompson – Actress turned hairdresser, Humphrey Bogart's friend.

== See also ==
- Battle of Nogales (1913)
- Battle of Nogales (1915)
- Battle of Ambos Nogales
- Nogales, Sonora
