= Nogales-Mariposa Port of Entry =

Border crossing between Mexico and the U.S.

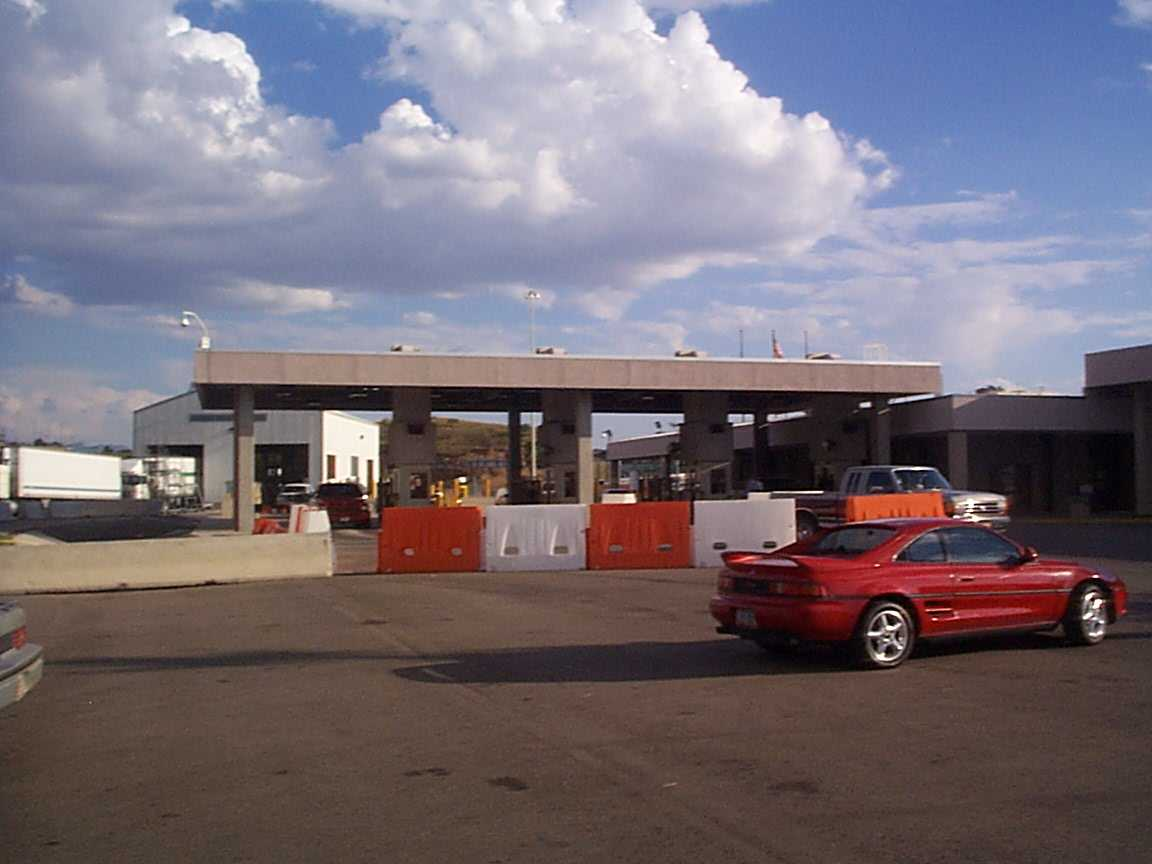
- Nogales-Mariposa Border Inspection Station, October 2000

Location
- Country: United States
- Location: SR 189 / Fed. 15D; 200 N. Mariposa Rd, Nogales, Arizona 85621
- Coordinates: 31.333900°N 110.965594°W

Details
- Opened: 1973

Statistics
- 2011 Cars: 2,641,068 (numbers for Mariposa and Grand Ave crossings combined)
- 2011 Trucks: 287,091
- Pedestrians: (not separately reported, but believed to be small in number)

Website
- http://www.cbp.gov/contact/ports/nogales

The Nogales-Mariposa Port of Entry is a border crossing between Mexico and The United States. It was opened in 1973 to divert truck traffic away from the busy downtown Grand Avenue border crossing. It connects Arizona State Route 189 directly with Mexican Federal Highway 15D. All commercial traffic entering the United States at Nogales now enters through the Mariposa port of entry.

== Renovations ==
The port facilities underwent a nearly $250 million renovation project between 2009 and 2014 to accommodate increasing traffic and to support new equipment and procedures. Renovation of roadways leading to the Mariposa Entry to reduce wait times for vehicles was begun in 2020 by the Arizona Department of Transportation, with expected completion in late 2021.

== See also ==
- List of Mexico–United States border crossings
