= Nogales-Grand Avenue Port of Entry =

Border crossing between Mexico and the U.S.

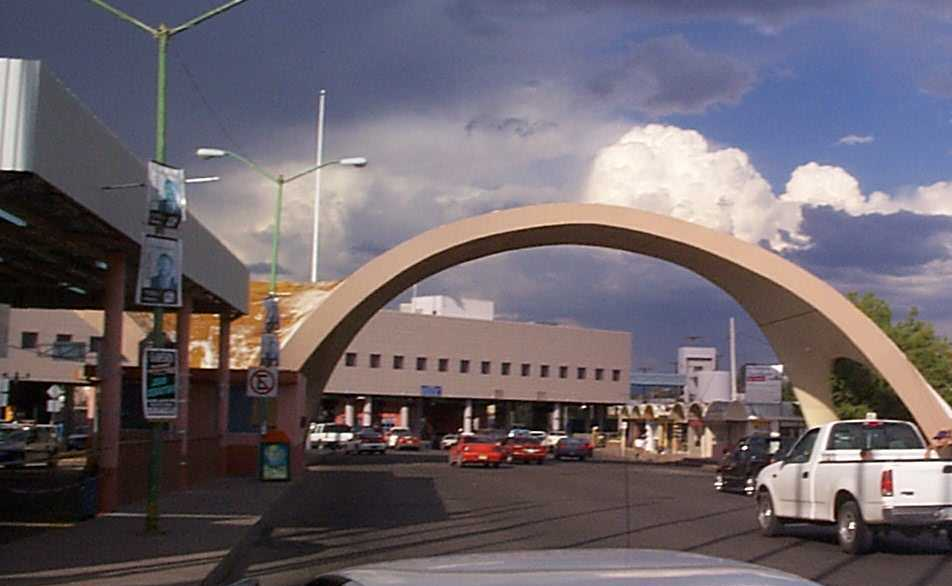
- Nogales-Grand Avenue Border Inspection Station as seen from Mexico

Location
- Country: United States
- Location: BL 19 / Fed. 15; 9 North Grand Avenue, Nogales, Arizona 85621
- Coordinates: 31.483269°N 111.544318°W

Details
- Opened: 1903

Statistics
- 2011 Cars: 2,641,068 (numbers for Mariposa and Grand Ave crossings combined)
- 2011 Trucks: 0
- Pedestrians: 3,525,540 (includes Morley gate and Mariposa pedestrians)

Website
- http://www.cbp.gov/contact/ports/nogales

The Nogales Arizona Port of Entry (aka Nogales-Deconcini) on Grand Avenue has been in existence since the early 20th century. It connects Interstate 19 with Mexican Federal Highway 15. The port of entry is named after former Arizona Senator Dennis DeConcini. The border station was completely rebuilt in 1966 and upgrades to the pedestrian gates were made by the General Services Administration in 2012. It is one of three border crossings in Nogales; the Nogales-Mariposa Port of Entry, built in 1973, handles commercial traffic west of the Grand Avenue crossing, while the adjacent Nogales-Morley Gate Port of Entry is used for pedestrians.

== History ==
Since its inception, vehicles, pedestrians and trains have been inspected here. In 1931, as part of a nationwide program to improve border security during Prohibition, The border fence was improved and two small inspection bungalows, which local residents termed "garitas", were constructed at portals on Grand Avenue and Morley Avenue. Morley Gate is dedicated to pedestrian crossings. The Grand Avenue garita was expanded substantially in 1949, but was replaced with the current multi-lane inspection facility in 1966.

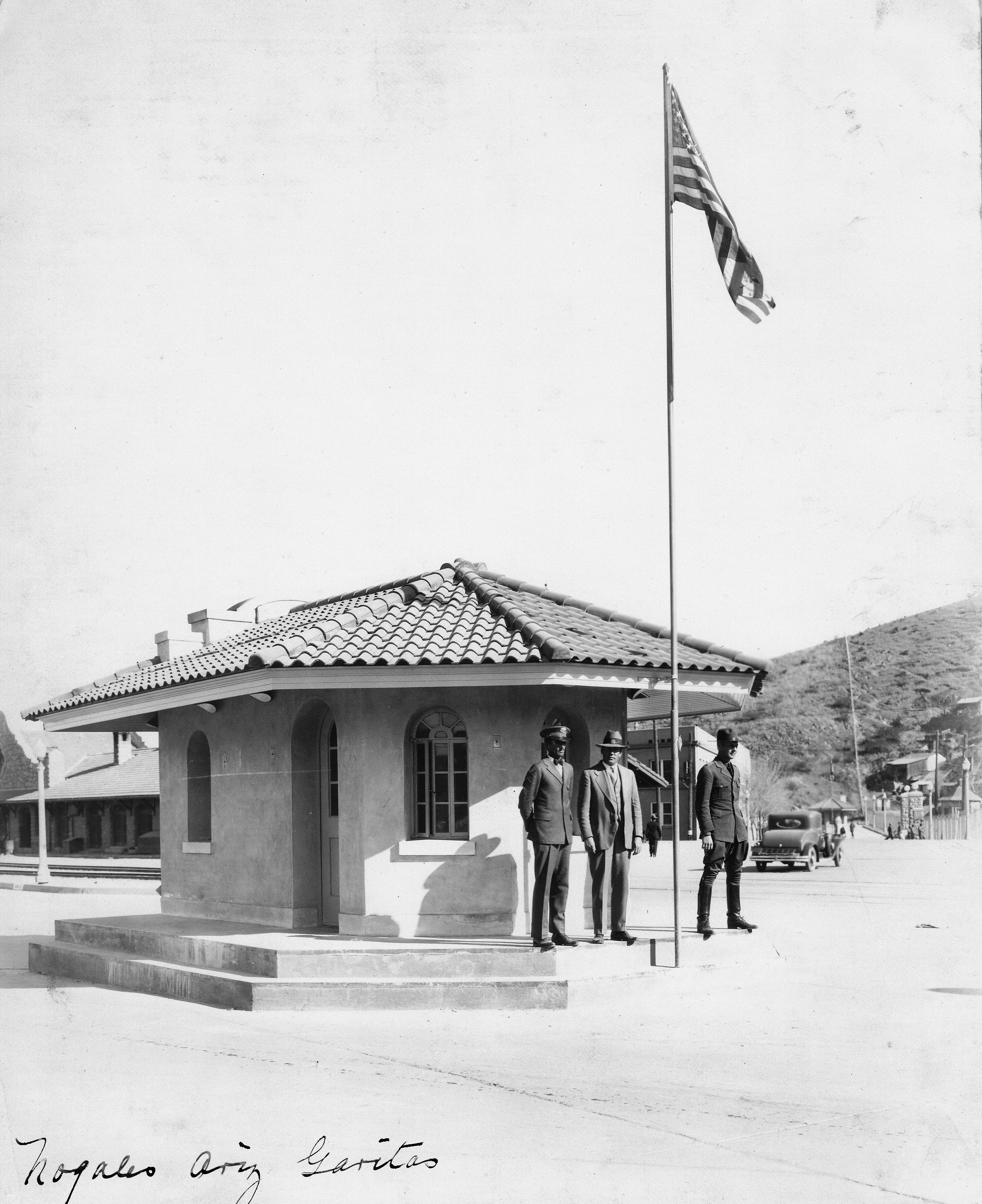
US Customs officers outside their garita in Nogales AZ 1931

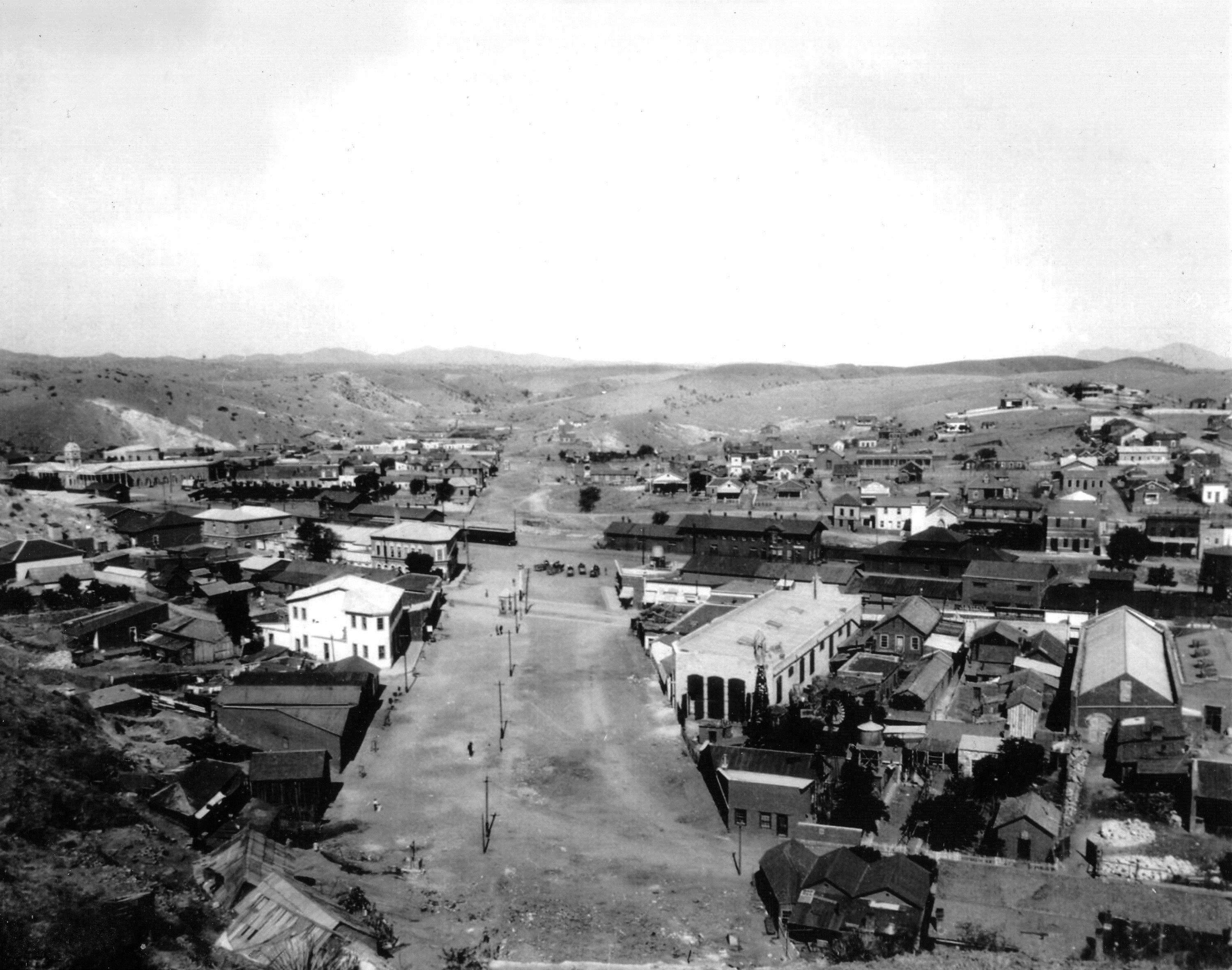
Nogales International Boundary looking west, in 1899 (prior to boundary fence and border inspection facilities)

== See also ==
- List of Mexico–United States border crossings
