= Amado, Arizona =

CDP in Pima County, Arizona

- Census-designated place
- Location in Santa Cruz County and the state of Arizona

- Location in the United States
- Coordinates: 31°42′18″N 111°3′56″W
- Country: United States
- State: Arizona
- County: Santa Cruz County, and Pima County

Area
  - Total: 5.21 sq mi (13.50 km^{2})
  - Land: 5.19 sq mi (13.45 km^{2})
  - Water: 0.015 sq mi (0.04 km^{2})
- Elevation: 3,097 ft (944 m)

Population (2020)
  - Total: 198
  - Density: 38.1/sq mi (14.72/km^{2})
- Time zone: UTC-7 (MST (no daylight saving time))
- ZIP codes: 85645, 85646
- Area code: 520
- FIPS code: 04-01990
- GNIS feature ID: 25614

Amado is a census-designated place (CDP) in Santa Cruz County, Arizona, United States. The population was 295 at the 2010 census and decreased to 198 by the 2020 census.

== Geography ==
Amado is located at 31°42′18″N 111°3′56″W (31.704900, -111.065492).

According to the United States Census Bureau, the CDP has a total area of 5.3 square miles (13.7 km^{2}), of which 5.3 square miles (13.6 km^{2}) is land and 0.015 square miles (0.04 km^{2}), or 0.33%, is water.

== Demographics ==
Historical population
Census	Pop.	Note	%±
2000	275		—
2010	295		7.3%
2020	198		−32.9%
U.S. Decennial Census

Amado's population was 40 in the 1960 census.

Amado appeared on the 2000 U.S. Census as a census-designated place (CDP).

As of the census of 2000, there were 275 people, 104 households, and 66 families residing in the CDP. The population density was 24.5 inhabitants per square mile (9.5/km^{2}). There were 107 housing units at an average density of 9.5 per square mile (3.7/km^{2}). The racial makeup of the CDP was 70.9% White, 0.4% Black or African American, 1.1% Native American, 0.7% Asian, 26.2% from other races, and 0.7% from two or more races. 43.3% of the population were Hispanic or Latino of any race.

There were 104 households, out of which 29.8% had children under the age of 18 living with them, 53.8% were married couples living together, 8.7% had a female householder with no husband present, and 35.6% were non-families. 27.9% of all households were made up of individuals, and 11.5% had someone living alone who was 65 years of age or older. The average household size was 2.64 and the average family size was 3.39.

In the CDP, the population was spread out, with 29.1% under the age of 18, 5.8% from 18 to 24, 24.7% from 25 to 44, 25.8% from 45 to 64, and 14.5% who were 65 years of age or older. The median age was 37 years. For every 100 females, there were 93.7 males. For every 100 females age 18 and over, there were 93.1 males.

The median income for a household in the CDP was $20,417, and the median income for a family was $82,922. Males had a median income of $22,946 versus $26,563 for females. The per capita income for the CDP was $21,452. About 7.1% of families and 8.8% of the population were below the poverty line, including 27.3% of those under the age of eighteen and none of those 65 or over.

== Amado in film ==
The opening "Oh, What a Beautiful Mornin'" sequence in the 1955 film Oklahoma!, with Gordon MacRae singing the famous song while riding a horse past the stalks of corn "as high as a elephant's eye", was filmed in Amado. One scene in Alice Doesn't Live Here Anymore was filmed in Amado at the Long Horn Grill, an iconic restaurant with an entrance in the shape of a large cow skull.

== See also ==
- Fred Lawrence Whipple Observatory
- MMT Observatory – visitor center for observatory is in Amado
- 2015 Amado checkpoint protest
