= Hohokam Pima National Monument =

Ancient Hohokam village in Arizona, United States

- Excavated possible ballcourt at Snaketown in 1935. It has since been backfilled.

- Location within Arizona Location within the United States
- Interactive map of Hohokam Pima National Monument
- Location: Gila River Indian Reservation, Arizona
- Coordinates: 33.1875°N 111.9245°W
- Area: 1,690 acres (6.8 km^{2})
- Authorized: October 21, 1972
- Owner: Gila River Indian Community

U.S. National Historic Landmark
- Official name: Snaketown
- Designated: April 29, 1964

U.S. National Register of Historic Places

The Hohokam Pima National Monument is an ancient Hohokam village within the Gila River Indian Community, near present-day Sacaton, Arizona. The monument features the archaeological site Snaketown 30 miles (48 km) southeast of Phoenix, Arizona, designated a National Historic Landmark in 1964. The area was further protected by declaring it a national monument in 1972, and was listed on the National Register of Historic Places in 1974.

The site is owned by the Gila River Indian Community, which has decided not to open the area to the public. There is no public access to the Hohokam Pima National Monument. The museum at the nearby Casa Grande Ruins National Monument, in Coolidge, Arizona, contains artifacts from Snaketown. The Huhugam Heritage Center also has exhibits on tribal history and archaeology.

Definitive dates are not clear, but the site was generally thought to be inhabited between 300 BCE and 1200 CE. Hohokam is an O’odham word meaning “those who have gone.” Specifically who the Hohokam people were and when the site was inhabited is subject to debate.

== Cultural history ==
This site is a significant example of the Hohokam culture, which lived in the broader area from about 1 CE until approximately 1500 CE. Snaketown, contained in a one-half mile by three-quarters mile piece of property, was occupied by Hohokam people during the Pioneer and Early Sedentary stages (approximately 300 BCE to 1100 CE). Early in the Classic Period (1150 CE – 1400/1450) the community of Snaketown, once apparently central to the broader Hohokam culture, was suddenly abandoned. Parts of its structure were burned, and the site was not reoccupied.

The Hohokam were farmers, even though they lived in an area with dry sandy soil, rugged volcanic mountains and slow running rivers. They grew beans, squash, tobacco, cotton and corn. The Hohokam made the sandy soil fertile by channeling water from the local river through a series of man-made canals. Woven mat dams were used to channel river water into the canals. The canals were generally shallow and wide, reaching up to ten miles in length.

Most of the population lived in pit houses, carefully dug rectangular depressions in the earth with branch and mud adobe walls supported by log sized corner posts. These pit houses were similar to those constructed by the neighboring Mogollon pueblo people, but were larger in size and made with a more shallow depression.

The oval shaped fields at Snaketown were identified as ballcourts at the time of excavation. Each was about 60 metres (200 ft) long, 33 metres (108 ft) apart, and 2.5 metres (8.2 ft) high. In 2009 it was suggested that the shape of an oval bowl with curved sides, and the uneven embankments on the long sides, are unsuited for any kind of ball game. However, they correspond with dance floors of the Tohono O'odham (Papago) people, used for their Vikita ceremonies until at least the 1930s.

Snaketown's pottery was generally homogeneous during the periods of its occupation. However, most specialists agree that pottery samples contain elements implying the presence two different, but probably related groups, over time.

Snaketown is dated by some scholars to around 300 BCE. Whether or not these were the Hohokam people is subject to debate. Paul Sidney Martin and Fred Plog argued that these were the Ootam people, which was a subdivision of the Cochise culture. According to these two, the Ootam were conquered and subsumed around 1000 CE by the Hohokam people from Mexico. Martin and Plog credit the Mexican Hohokam people with bringing extensive irrigation works, as well as other features attributed to what is thought of as Hohokam culture, from the south. Emil Haury, an established scholar on the subject, makes no mention of this apparently hostile takeover. Furthermore, he views the Hohokam as a harmonious people, particularly in the way they shared water. Archaeologist Brian Fagan dates Hohokam culture to 500 CE, and sums up the situation by stating that there are simply two separate schools of thought on the subject. Martin and Plog belong to the first group and Haury belongs to the second. The second group argues that these features the first group believes came from Mexico were developed locally. While there is much dispute on the origin of Snaketown, most scholars are able to agree that Hohokam culture peaked between 700 and 900 CE. Snaketown derives its name from another O’odham word meaning “place of snakes” and is considered to be one of the larger Hohokam settlements. A type of pottery (called red-on-buff) that is identified as distinctly Hohokam is found over ca. 30,000 square miles (78,000 km^{2}) of the southwest. This indicates the extent and prominence of the Hohokam people at their height.

== Archaeology ==
The site of Snaketown is positioned on the Gila River and the community is estimated to have been 250 acres in size at its maximum extent, with much more farmland and smaller settlements surrounding it. It has been estimated that in the Hohokam era, canals were built in this area up to seven miles (11 km) long, providing water for 70,000 acres of land. The size of the canals indicates that Snaketown probably formed a type of weak chiefdom, however some feel that the canals do not indicate this type of social complexity. Snaketown at its height contained between 1000 and 3000 people. The household was most likely the fundamental building block of Hohokam society. The water was thought to have been owned by the entire community, but families probably maintained the rights to plots of land. People who aided in the building of the canals may have received first pick of the land. The more affluent would own larger plots of land and were therefore rationed larger portions of water to maintain them. Housing of Hohokam people varies according to status, time and sources. It is generally agreed that simple adobe structures and impermanent housing were used depending upon the time of the year. Small dams were placed systematically to control the intensity of the river flow. Snaketown also included a central plaza and two installations, that were identified as ballcourts at the time of excavation since its earliest times, but did not always include irrigation. In its earliest stage it most likely resembled other agrarian cultures of the time. As irrigation grew, the Hohokam people continued to prosper. They began to grow new crops such as agave and tobacco and, although maize farmers, they most likely subsidized their diet with small amounts of hunting and gathering. As Snaketown grew in size between 975 and 1150 CE, an additional ball court was built. Some scholars believe the ball courts may have promoted trade or competition between communities or segments of communities. A number of status symbols and trading pieces were found at Snaketown, indicating the Hohokam's affinity for trading. These pieces included shell, stone, and macaw feathers. Trash heaps played just as crucial of a role as trading pieces in the archaeology of Snaketown. Many of the trash heaps helped archaeologists develop the chronology of the site.

The oval shaped fields at Snaketown were originally identified as ballcourts. Each was about 60 meters long, 33 meters apart, and 2.5 meters high. In 2009 it was suggested that the shape of an oval bowl with curved sides and the uneven embankments on the long sides are unsuited for any kind of ball game. On the other hand, they correspond perfectly with dance floors of the Papagos, used for their Vikita ceremonies until at least the 1930s.

Snaketown houses were shallow pit houses. There were hearths, small clay lined basins near the doorways. These houses were home to small groups of extended families

== Archaeological history ==
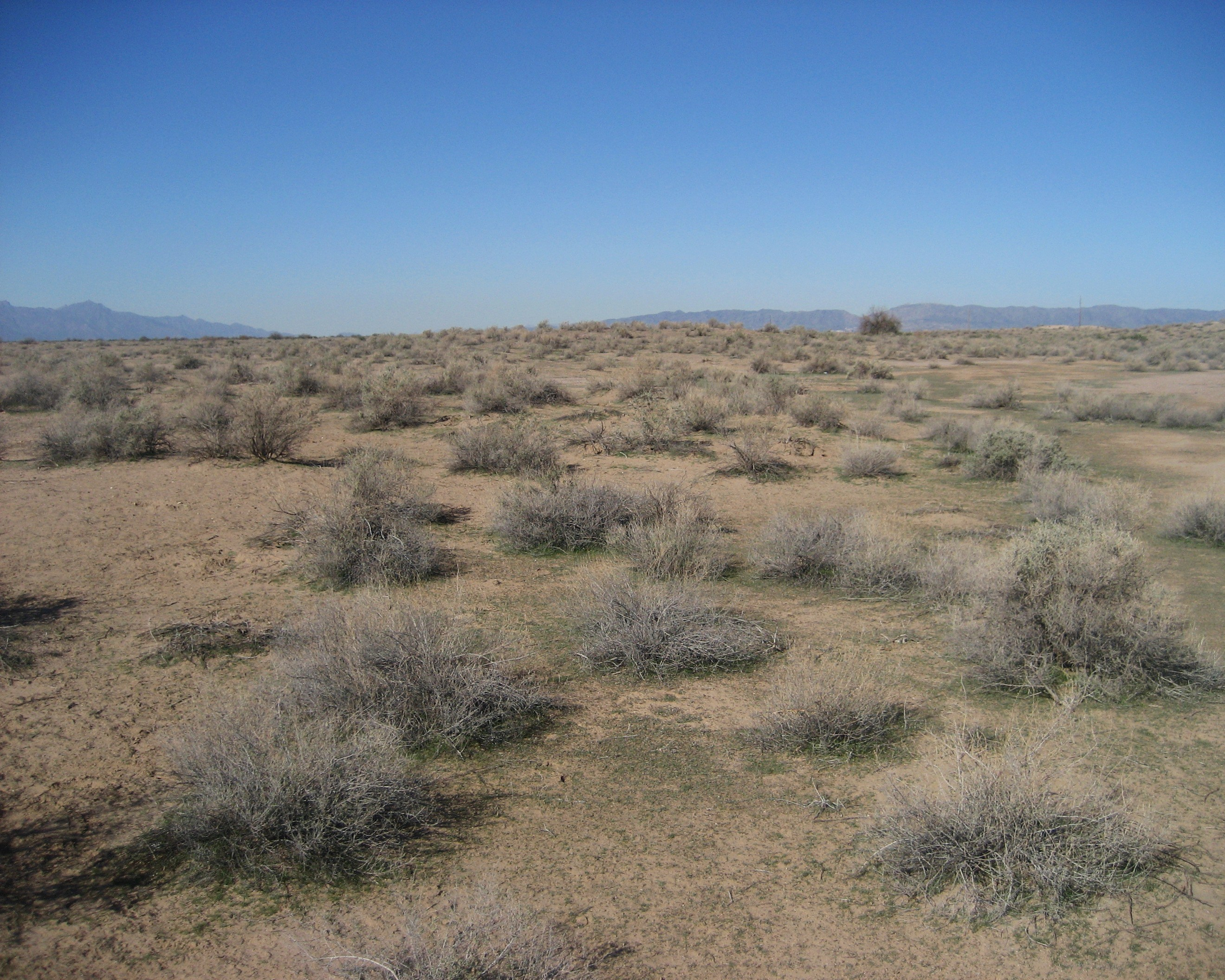
View of Snaketown site, 2008

Snaketown was first excavated in 1934 by the Gila Pueblo Foundation, under the direction of Harold S. Gladwin. Between 1964 and 1965, a second excavation was led by Emil Haury, assistant director of Gila Pueblo, with assistance from E.B. Sayles, Erik K. Reed, and Irwin and Julian Hayden. The two expeditions discovered that the site contained more than sixty midden mounds. A central plaza and two oval shaped fields were surrounded by pit houses, and an elaborate irrigation system fed the nearby fields in which beans, maize and squash were grown. The Hohokam practiced cremation, and the expedition excavated up to eight areas which could have been used as crematoria. Industries producing pottery and shell jewellery also existed and the settlement had trade links with Mesoamerican societies, evidenced by copper bells and figurines.

Most archaeological excavations have been backfilled to protect the site for future research. However, a scale model of the original Snaketown community is held at the Heard Museum in Phoenix, while artifacts from excavations are housed in the Arizona State Museum.

== Archaeologists and Snaketown ==
Winifred and Harold Gladwin began the intensive study of Hohokam culture with the help of Emil Haury. They eventually founded a research organization entitled “The Gila Pueblo Archaeological Foundation” that focused on the Hohokam tradition at other sites, but eventually led Haury to Snaketown, which he excavated in the early 1930s. Haury eventually returned to Snaketown in 1964 as a result of new data discovered by the works of Charles Di Peso and Albert Schroeder on Hohokam culture at other sites. This caused Haury to refine his view on Hohokam origins while also reaffirming some initial thoughts on Hohokam chronology. This was some of the latest archaeology done in Snaketown, as it was declared a national monument in 1972 and reburied by the Pima people for preservation purposes. The records for the Gila Pueblo Archaeological Foundation are held by the Arizona State Museum Library & Archives.

== The abandonment of Snaketown ==
It is not particularly clear what caused the abandonment of Snaketown around 1100 CE. Haury cites over-irrigation leading to soil depletion as a possibility for its fall, but still contends that abandonment also occurred in nearby cultures that were less dependent on irrigation. Fagan notes that this time coincides with the Medieval Warm Period, which might have caused droughts. Fagan also suggests that the people continued farming in a much less organized manner or relocated according to remaining irrigation canals. Haury maintains that Snaketown was deserted around 1100 CE while Fagan uses the later dates of 1150–1450. Several texts maintain that its population increased until the dispersal of its population. The dispersal could have occurred quickly and violently, as the archaeological record indicates the burning of many buildings at the same time.

== Re-colonization and Snaketown ==
In 1865, the United States Cavalry created Camp McDowell in the general vicinity of Snaketown. In 1867, a retired soldier began the Swilling Irrigating and Canal Company on the remains of the ancient canals. As the company succeeded, a settlement began to form, which was eventually dubbed “Phoenix” after the mythological Phoenix creature that is reborn from its own remains.

== See also ==
- Casa Grande Ruins National Monument
- List of national monuments of the United States
- Mesa Grande
- Pueblo Grande Ruin and Irrigation Sites
- Oasisamerica cultures
- List of National Historic Landmarks in Arizona
- National Register of Historic Places listings in Pinal County, Arizona

== Selected books and monographs ==
- Crown, Patrica L. and Judge, James W, editors. Chaco & Hohokam: Prehistoric Regional Systems in the American Southwest. School of American Research Press, Santa Fe, New Mexico, 1991. ISBN 0-933452-76-4.
- Emil W. Haury 1976. The Hohokam Desert Farmers and Craftsmen – Excavations at Snaketown, 1964–65. The University of Arizona Press, Tucson.
- Gladwin, Harold S. and Winifred; Haury; and Sayles 1938. “Excavations at Snaketown: Material Culture.” Medallion Papers. Gila Pueblo, Globe, Arizona. Reprinted 1965 by the University of Arizona Press, Tucson.
- SNAKETOWN REVISITED: A Partial Cultural Resource Survey, Analysis of Site Structure and an Ethnohistoric Study of the Proposed Hohokam-Pima National Monument
