= List of National Historic Landmarks in Arizona =

This is a List of National Historic Landmarks in Arizona. There are 47 National Historic Landmarks (NHLs) in Arizona, counting Hoover Dam that spans from Nevada and is listed in Nevada by the National Park Service (NPS), and Yuma Crossing and Associated Sites, which is listed by the NPS in Arizona, and overlaps into California. The first designated was San Xavier del Bac Mission, in October, 1960. The most recently designated is the Klagetoh (Leegito) Chapter House in January 2021.

== Key ==
	National Historic Landmark
^{†}	National Historic Landmark District
^{#}	National Historic Site, National Historical Park, National Memorial, or National Monument
^{*}	Delisted Landmark

== List of NHLs ==
	Landmark name	Image	Date designated	Location	County	Description
1	1956 Grand Canyon TWA – United Airlines Aviation Accident Site	1956 Grand Canyon TWA – United Airlines Aviation Accident Site	April 23, 2014 (#14000280)	Grand Canyon National Park; 36°10′30″N 111°49′59″W	Coconino	Crash area of first major (100+ deaths) commercial air disaster in the United States; led to creation of Federal Aviation Administration
2	Air Force Facility Missile Site 8 (Titan II ICBM Site 571-7)	Air Force Facility Missile Site 8	April 19, 1994 (#92001234)	Green Valley; 31°54′05″N 110°59′54″W	Pima	Last surviving Titan II missile launch facility; inactive
3^{#}	Apache Pass and Fort Bowie	Apache Pass and Fort Bowie	December 19, 1960 (#72000194)	Bowie; 32°08′46″N 109°26′08″W	Cochise	Commemorates the conflict between the Chiricahua Apaches and the United States military; preserves the ruins of Fort Bowie
4	Awatovi Ruins	Awatovi Ruins	July 19, 1964 (#66000187)	Keams Canyon; 35°43′07″N 110°16′37″W	Navajo	Ruins of a 500-year-old pueblo visited by Coronado's men in 1540
5	Casa Malpais Site	Casa Malpais Site	July 19, 1964 (#66000936)	Springerville; 34°09′N 109°18′W	Apache	Ruin built around 1250; inhabited until about 1400 by Mogollon culture. Tours and museum
6^{†}	Mary Jane Colter Buildings (Hopi House, The Lookout, Hermit's Rest, and the Desert View Watchtower)	Mary Jane Colter Buildings (Hopi House, The Lookout, Hermit's Rest, and the Desert View Watchtower)	May 28, 1987 (#87001436)	South Rim locations in Grand Canyon National Park; 36°03′29″N 112°08′13″W	Coconino	Includes Desert View Watchtower, Hermits Rest, Hopi House, and The Lookout.
7	Desert Laboratory	Desert Laboratory	December 21, 1965 (#66000190)	Tucson; 32°13′31″N 111°00′09″W	Pima	Founded in 1903 to study plant adaptation to an arid desert environment with long term experiments, this laboratory contributed significantly to the formation of Ecology as a science. Part of the University of Arizona
8	Double Adobe Site	Double Adobe Site	January 20, 1961 (#66000169)	Douglas; 31°21′00″N 109°32′00″W	Cochise	Archaeological site where development of the Cochise Culture occurred
9	El Tovar	El Tovar	May 28, 1987 (#74000334)	Grand Canyon Village; 36°03′21″N 112°08′13″W	Coconino	Classic lodge at South Rim of Grand Canyon
10^{†}	Fort Apache and Theodore Roosevelt School	Fort Apache and Theodore Roosevelt School	March 2, 2012 (#76000377)	Fort Apache; 33°47′23″N 109°59′21″W	Navajo	Site of historic Fort Apache; later converted to a school for the purpose of assimilating the native population. It is now a tribal museum.
11	Fort Huachuca	Fort Huachuca	May 11, 1976 (#74000443)	Sierra Vista; 31°33′19″N 110°20′59″W	Cochise	Commemorates "Buffalo Soldiers"
12	Gatlin Site	Gatlin Site	July 19, 1964 (#66000183)	Gila Bend; 32°58′51″N 112°42′06″W	Maricopa	Preserves a Hohokam platform mound, pit houses, ball courts, middens, and prehistoric canals
13	Grand Canyon Depot	Grand Canyon Depot	May 28, 1987 (#74000337)	Grand Canyon Village; 36°03′15″N 112°08′11″W	Coconino	Railway station constructed in 1909–10 for the Atchison, Topeka and Santa Fe Railroad
14	Grand Canyon Lodge	Grand Canyon Lodge	May 28, 1987 (#82001721)	North Rim, Grand Canyon National Park; 36°11′57″N 112°03′07″W	Coconino	Lodge at Bright Angel Point, on North Rim of Grand Canyon. Destroyed by the Dragon Bravo Fire in 2025.
15	Grand Canyon Park Operations Building	Grand Canyon Park Operations Building	May 28, 1987 (#87001412)	Grand Canyon Village; 36°03′12″N 112°08′13″W	Coconino	National Park Service building; built in 1929; designed to blend with the natural surroundings
16	Grand Canyon Power House	Grand Canyon Power House	May 28, 1987 (#87001411)	Grand Canyon Village; 36°03′14″N 112°08′24″W	Coconino	Rustic building designed to conceal the purpose of the building, which was to provide power to the railroad.
17^{†}	Grand Canyon Village	Grand Canyon Village	February 18, 1987 (#75000343)	Grand Canyon Village; 36°03′20″N 112°08′18″W	Coconino	Planned town significant for its urban planning and ecological sensitivity
18	Hoover Dam	Hoover Dam	August 20, 1985 (#81000382)	Lake Mead National Recreation Area; 36°00′56″N 114°44′16″W	Mohave, AZ and Clark, NV	Historic dam, power plant and water-storage facility
19^{#}	Hubbell Trading Post	Hubbell Trading Post	December 12, 1960 (#66000167)	Ganado; 35°43′32″N 109°35′36″W	Apache	Meeting ground of two cultures, the Navajo and the settlers
20^{†}	Jerome Historic District	Jerome Historic District	November 13, 1966 (#66000196)	Jerome; 34°45′13″N 112°06′41″W	Yavapai	Copper mining town
21^{†}	Kinishba Ruins	Kinishba Ruins	July 19, 1964 (#66000180)	Whiteriver; 33°48′53″N 110°03′16″W	Gila	Large pueblo ruin; accessible via Fort Apache Historical Park.
22	Klagetoh (Leegito) Chapter House		January 13, 2021 (#100006279)	Klagetoh; 35°29′58″N 109°31′48″W	Apache	
23	Lehner Mammoth-Kill Site	Lehner Mammoth-Kill Site	May 28, 1967 (#67000002)	Hereford; 31°26′00″N 110°06′00″W	Cochise	Clovis culture mammoth butchering site
24	Los Santos Ángeles de Guevavi	Los Santos Ángeles de Guevavi	June 21, 1990 (#71000119)	Nogales; 31°24′36″N 110°54′10″W	Santa Cruz	Ruins of Spanish mission church; founded 1691
25	Lowell Observatory	Lowell Observatory	December 21, 1965 (#66000172)	Flagstaff; 35°12′10″N 111°39′52″W	Coconino	Observatory where Pluto was discovered
26	C. Hart Merriam Base Camp Site	C. Hart Merriam Base Camp Site	December 21, 1965 (#66000173)	Flagstaff; 35°22′29″N 111°43′34″W	Coconino	Work site of C. Hart Merriam, path-breaking eco-biologist
27	Murray Springs Clovis Site	Murray Springs Clovis Site	October 16, 2012 (#12001019)	Sierra Vista; 31°34′14″N 110°08′27″W	Cochise	Clovis culture site associated with bison and mammoth kills; site open to public.
28	Navajo Nation Council Chamber	Navajo Nation Council Chamber	August 18, 2004 (#04001155)	Window Rock; 35°40′58″N 109°02′54″W	Apache	Center of government for Navajo Nation.
29^{†}	Old Oraibi	Old Oraibi	July 19, 1964 (#66000188)	Oraibi; 35°52′35″N 110°38′25″W	Navajo	Historic Hopi village
30^{†}	Painted Desert Community Complex Historic District	Painted Desert Community Complex Historic District	December 23, 2016 (#100000838)	One Park Rd. 35°04′06″N 109°46′50″W	Apache	
31	Painted Desert Inn	Painted Desert Inn	May 28, 1987 (#87001421)	Petrified Forest National Park; 35°05′01″N 109°47′20″W	Apache	Lodge in the Petrified Forest National Park
32	Phelps Dodge General Office Building	Phelps Dodge General Office Building	May 4, 1983 (#71000109)	Bisbee; 31°26′25″N 109°54′41″W	Cochise	Phelps Dodge mining company headquarters from 1896 to 1961
33	Point of Pines Sites	Point of Pines Sites	July 19, 1964 (#66000182)	San Carlos Apache Indian Reservation; 33°21′13″N 109°44′40″W	Graham	Set of archaeological sites associated with Anasazi, Mogollon and Hohokam cultures; location is site of archaeological field camp
34	Poston Elementary School, Unit 1, Colorado River Relocation Center	Poston Elementary School, Unit 1, Colorado River Relocation Center	October 16, 2012 (#12001010)	Parker; 33°59′31″N 114°24′24″W	La Paz	Located at the former Poston War Relocation Center, this is the only surviving elementary school building from any World War II-era Japanese internment camp.
35^{†}	Pueblo Grande Ruin and Irrigation Sites	Pueblo Grande Ruin and Irrigation Sites	July 19, 1964 (#66000185)	Phoenix; 33°26′47″N 111°59′03″W	Maricopa	Pueblo Grande Ruin and adjacent Hohokam-Pima Irrigation Sites
36^{†}	Sage Memorial Hospital School of Nursing		January 16, 2009 (#09000082)	Ganado; 35°42′40″N 109°32′36″W	Apache	
37^{†}	San Bernardino Ranch	San Bernardino Ranch	July 19, 1964 (#66000170)	Douglas; 31°20′11″N 109°16′47″W	Cochise	Historic cattle ranch
38	San Cayetano de Calabazas	San Cayetano de Calabazas	December 14, 1990 (#71000118)	Nogales; 31°27′09″N 110°57′34″W	Santa Cruz	Spanish mission, also known as Calabasas; part of Tumacácori National Historical Park.
39	San Xavier del Bac Mission	San Xavier del Bac Mission	October 9, 1960 (#66000191)	Tucson; 32°06′25″N 111°00′29″W	Pima	Spanish mission founded in 1699
40	Sierra Bonita Ranch	Sierra Bonita Ranch	July 19, 1964 (#66000181)	Bonita; 32°35′00″N 109°58′00″W	Cochise and Graham	First permanent American cattle ranch in Arizona
41	Snaketown	Snaketown	April 29, 1964 (#07001462)	Hohokam Pima National Monument; 33°10′59″N 111°55′12″W	Pinal	Archaeological remains of the Hohokam culture
42	Taliesin West	Taliesin West	May 20, 1982 (#74000457)	Scottsdale; 33°36′11″N 111°50′38″W	Maricopa	Winter home of architect Frank Lloyd Wright
43^{†}	Tombstone Historic District	Tombstone Historic District	July 4, 1961 (#66000171)	Tombstone; 31°42′45″N 110°03′59″W	Cochise	Classic Western mining boomtown; location of the OK Corral
44	Tumacacori Museum	Tumacacori Museum	May 28, 1987 (#87001437)	Tumacacori; 31°33′58″N 111°03′01″W	Santa Cruz	Museum to Spanish missions that itself is an architectural landmark
45	Ventana Cave	Ventana Cave	January 20, 1964 (#66000189)	Santa Rosa; 32°21′00″N 112°14′00″W	Pima	Archaeological site; has evidence of Native American occupation of the area for the last 4,000 years
46	Winona Site		July 19, 1964 (#66000177)	Winona; 35°12′00″N 111°24′00″W	Coconino	Archaeological site; evidence of cultural change following eruption of Sunset Crater
47^{†}	Yuma Crossing and Associated Sites	Yuma Crossing and Associated Sites	November 13, 1966 (#66000197)	Yuma, AZ and Winterhaven, CA; 32°43′43″N 114°36′52″W	Yuma County, AZ and Imperial County, CA	Archaeological and historical sites including Yuma Quartermaster Depot and Arizona Territorial Prison

== Former listing ==
	Landmark name	Image	Date of designation	Date of move or dedesignation	Location	County	Description
1	Roosevelt Dam		May 23, 1963	March 10, 1999	Roosevelt	Gila and Maricopa	When built in 1906–11, this was the highest masonry dam in the world, and the first major reclamation project dam in the western United States. It was substantially altered in 1989–96, enlarging the structure and encasing the original in concrete.

== See also ==
- National Register of Historic Places listings in Arizona
- List of National Historic Landmarks by state
- List of historic properties in Phoenix, Arizona
- List of historic properties in Glendale, Arizona
- List of National Natural Landmarks in Arizona
