= Richard B. Woodbury =

American archaeologist

- Born: May 17, 1917
- Died: October 11, 2009 (aged 92)
- Other name: Dick
- Occupations: American anthropologist, archaeologist, academic
- Spouse: Nathalie Ferris Sampson Woodbury
- Awards: Society for American Archaeology (SAA) Distinguished Service Award, 1988

Academic background
- Thesis: Prehistoric Stone Implements of Northeastern Arizona (1949)
- Influences: John Otis Brew

Academic work
- Discipline: American Southwestern Archaeologist
- Sub-discipline: Ancient Southwestern and South American Anthropological Specialist.
- Institutions: Columbia University (1952–1958), University of Arizona (1958–1963), Smithsonian Institution Department of Anthropology (1963–1969), University of Massachusetts, Amherst (1969–1981)

Richard Benjamin Woodbury (May 17, 1917 – October 11, 2009) was a prominent American archaeologist, specializing in studies of prehistoric and pre-Columbian archaeology.

== Career ==
Woodbury began his specialty in Southwestern archaeology during his undergraduate degree at Harvard, participating in the 1938 Peabody Awatovi expedition under the archaeologist J. O. Brew. His doctoral dissertation based on this project explores the stone tool technology used by ancient Hopi Native Americans.

After serving in World War II in the Air Force, Woodbury participated in several notable archaeological excavations concerning pre-Columbian peoples, including at the Point of Pines sites in Arizona, the Adena mounds, and the Zaculeu dig. He also critiqued prior digs such as the Hendricks-Hodge Expedition at Hawikuh, along with his fellow archaeologists Nathalie F. S. Woodbury and Watson Smith. His publications focus on the ancient Zuni, Hopi, Pueblo, Papago, and Maya native cultures and peoples.

Woodbury worked as a Professor at Columbia and the University of Arizona from the 1950s to 1960s. At the University of Arizona, he taught in the Arid Lands Program and Anthropology Department. During this time, Woodbury served as an editor for the Society for American Archaeology.

Woodbury began a position of Curator of Archaeology and Anthropology at the Smithsonian Institution in 1963. In 1965, Woodbury was also serving on the executive board of the American Anthropological Association. The Smithsonian reorganized a new Department of Anthropology with Woodbury as acting chair.

After leaving the Smithsonian, Woodbury worked at UMass Amherst for the end of his professorial career, but continued to take positions for academic journals. Woodbury was the editor of American Anthropologist from 1975 to 1978.

Nathalie F. S. Woodbury and Dick Woodbury were founding members of the Archaeological Conservancy in the early 1980s along with Mark Michel, Helene Beck, and Jay Last.

Dick and Nathalie were both awarded the 1988 SAA Distinguished Service Award.

== Selected works ==
- Woodbury, Richard B. 1941. "Early Man in South America : A Geological and Archeological Problem." OCLC 228512316.
- Woodbury, Richard (October 1948). "Progress at Zaculeu, Guatemala". American Antiquity. 14 (2). Menasha, Wisconsin, USA.: Society for American Archaeology. OCLC 482157270.
- Woodbury, Richard B., Harvard University Department of Anthropology, and Awatovi Expedition (1935–1939). 1949. "Prehistoric Stone Implements of Northeastern Arizona; a Study of the Origin, Distribution and Function of the Stone Tools, Ornaments and Weapons of the Jeddito District." Dissertation. OCLC 594787. https://hdl.handle.net/2027/osu.32435021440177
- Woodbury, Richard B., Aubrey S. Trik, and Jay I. Kislak Reference Collection (Library of Congress). 1954. The Ruins of Zaculeu, Guatemala. New York: United Fruit Co. OCLC 1850696
- Woodbury, Richard B. 1959. Abstracts of New World Archaeology. Washington: Society for American Archaeology. OCLC 1120384868.
- Woodbury, Richard B. 1961. Prehistoric Agriculture at Point of Pines, Arizona. Salt Lake City: Soc. of American Archaeology. OCLC 1068780739.
- Woodbury, Richard B., Nathalie F. S. Woodbury, and University of Arizona Bureau of Ethnic Research. 1962. A Study of Land Use on the Papago Indian Reservation, Arizona. Tucson, Arizona. OCLC 7505635.
- Woodbury, Nathalie F. S., Richard B. Woodbury, Watson Smith, Frederick Webb Hodge, and Hendricks-Hodge Expedition (1917–1923). 1966. The Excavation of Hawikuh by Frederick Webb Hodge: Report of the Hendricks-Hodge Expedition, 1917-1923. New York: Museum of the American Indian, Heye Foundation. https://doi.org/10.5479/sil.473242.39088016102782 Internet Archive link: https://archive.org/details/excavationofhawi00hodg
- Woodbury, Richard B. 1973. Alfred V. Kidder. New York: Columbia University Press. ISBN 0231034849. OCLC 447403
- Woodbury, Richard B. 1993. 60 Sixty Years of Southwestern Archaeology: A History of the Pecos Conference. 1st ed. Albuquerque: University of New Mexico Press. ISBN 0826314112. OCLC 26674867.

== See also ==
- Awatovi Ruins
- Zaculeu
- Point of Pines Sites
- Hawikuh Ruins
- Pre-Columbian era
- Handbook of North American Indians
- Zuni people
- National Anthropological Archives
- The Archaeological Conservancy
- American Anthropologist
- Society for American Archaeology
- American Antiquity
- Prehistoric archaeology
