= Awatovi Ruins =

Archaeological site in Arizona

- U.S. National Register of Historic Places
- U.S. National Historic Landmark
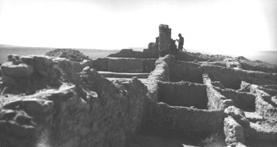
- The ruins photographed in 1937

- Location within Arizona Location within the United States
- Location: Hopi Indian Reservation, Navajo County, Arizona, USA
- Nearest city: Keams Canyon, Arizona
- Coordinates: 35°43′7″N 110°16′37″W
- Built: 1200
- NRHP reference No.: 66000187

Significant dates
- Added to NRHP: October 15, 1966
- Designated NHL: July 19, 1964

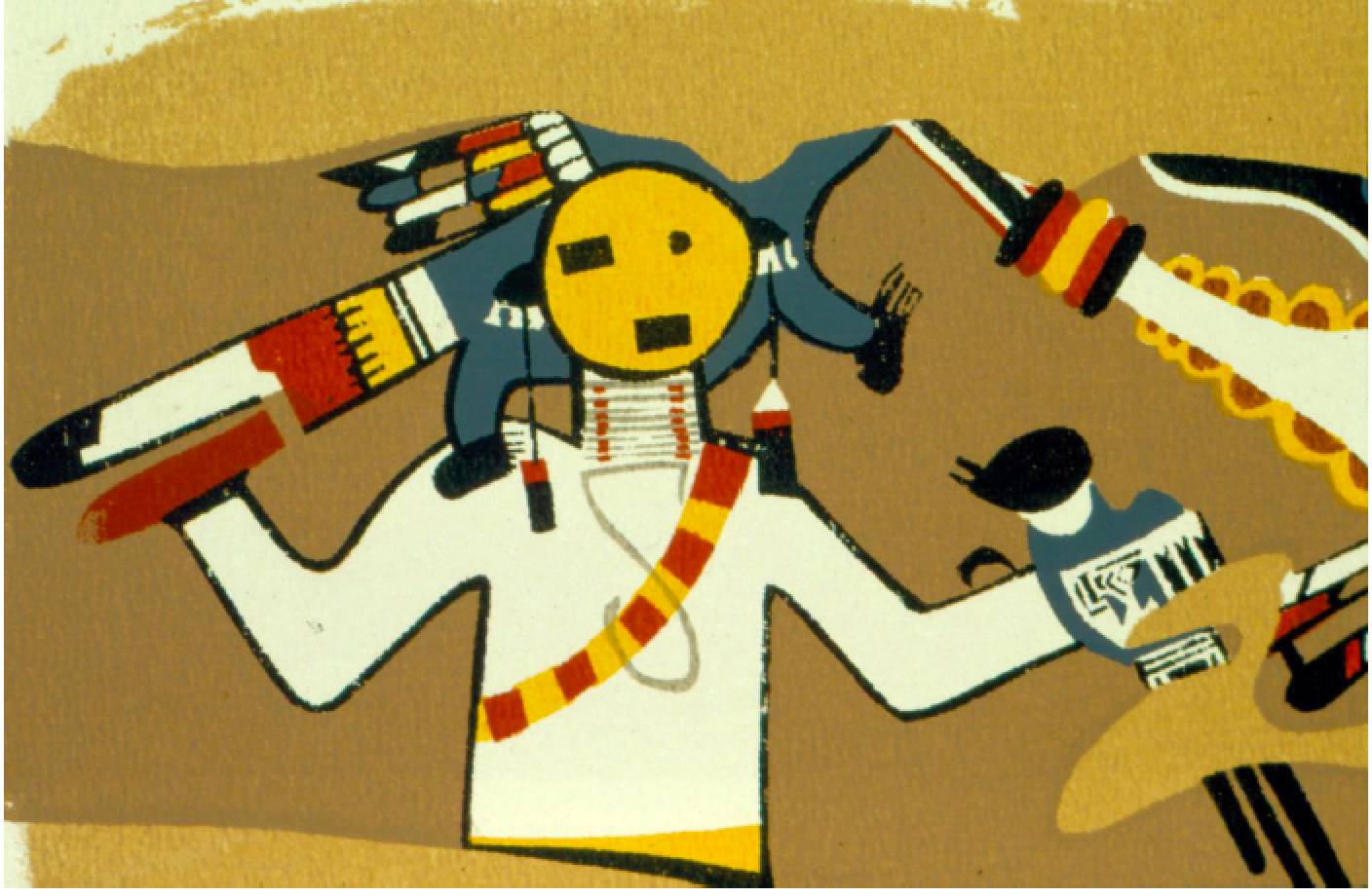
Awatovi mural, Test 14 Room 2. Restoration from the Peabody Museum excavations, likely by Fred Kabotie.

The Awatovi Ruins, spelled Awat'ovi in recent literature, are an archaeological site on the Hopi Reservation in northeastern Arizona, United States. The site contains the ruins of a pueblo estimated to be 500 years old, as well as those of a 17th-century Spanish mission. It was visited in the 16th century by members of Francisco Vázquez de Coronado's exploratory expedition. In the 1930s, Hopi artist Fred Kabotie was commissioned by the Peabody Museum of Archaeology and Ethnology of Harvard University to reproduce the prehistoric murals found during the excavation of the Awatovi Ruins. The site was designated a National Historic Landmark in 1964.

The site has been studied, and now even the campsite of the archaeologists is itself of archaeological interest: the Awatovi Expedition of the Peabody Museum campsite is itself deemed an archaeological site worthy of further study.

== Pre-European history ==
Awatovi was founded sometime after 1300, according to ceramics recovered from the archaeological excavations of Awatovi. It quickly grew to be the largest and most important village within the Hopi area. It housed members of the Bow Clan and was the largest of the villages on Antelope Mesa. Recent research has placed Awatovi as the leading village of a macro-cluster that included the villages on Antelope Mesa, on First Mesa, and an outlying cluster of villages at Homol'ovi on the Little Colorado River some 50 miles (80 kilometers) to the south. There is some archaeological evidence to suggest that while modern Hopis claim ancestry with the Jeddito Phase sites, including Awatovi, these Jeddito villages may not have been Hopi.

== European contact ==
Awatovi was the first of the Hopi villages to be visited and conquered by the Spanish. In the early 16th century, Awatovi was one of the largest and most important of the villages. It had already been in existence for about 450 years. The first European visitor, in 1540, was Pedro de Tovar, dispatched by Francisco Vázquez de Coronado to the Hopi villages a week after the capture of Hawikuh. A skirmish occurred when de Tovar arrived, but the inhabitants quickly sued for peace and offered presents of cloth, skins, turquoise, and maize. The five remaining Hopi pueblos then offered fealty to the King of Spain.

The Spanish did not visit Hopi again until 1583, when the Antonio de Espejo expedition spent several days at the Hopi villages before turning southwest to the Verde Valley. Juan de Oñate, in 1598, found the Hopis ready to capitulate formally to the King of Spain. Oñate visited the pueblos again in 1605, and Captain Gerónimo Marquez in 1614, but not until 1629 did the Spanish make any substantial missionary effort among the Hopis. This same year the Spanish friars built the mission of San Bernardo de Aguatubi over the main kiva at Awatovi, following the practice of "supremacy" where the church would be built over the most important site of the heathen religion. The documentary record indicates abusive behavior by priests at Awatovi in the 1650s. In 1656, a young Hopi man by the name of Juan Suñi was sent to Santa Fe as an indentured servant because he impersonated the resident priest, Alonso de Posada, at Awatovi, an act believed to have been carried out in the spirit of Hopi clowning.

During the Pueblo Revolt, the Hopis razed the church at Awatovi and killed the priests operating at the other Hopi villages. The Hopis expected reprisals for participating in the 1680 rebellion, but none came. When Diego de Vargas, the reconqueror, arrived in 1692, the Hopis apparently reswore their allegiance to Spain, and he departed without incident. Not long afterward, the Spaniards rebuilt the mission of San Bernardo de Aguatubi.

In 1700, tensions began to grow in the pueblo of Awatovi between the converted Hopis and traditionalists. By the end of 1700, the extreme hostility of most Hopis to Christian converts at Awatovi led to the destruction of the pueblo. The attackers killed all the men at Awatovi, and scattered the women and children among the other villages. The site was never reoccupied.

== History after abandonment ==
Important early work at Awatovi was reported by Jesse Walter Fewkes in 1893–95. Extensive archaeological excavations were conducted at Awatovi by J. O. Brew of the Peabody Museum in the 1930s. Brew's extensive artifact collections and archives are held at the Peabody Museum. Most of his excavations have been backfilled. "Not all Hopis approved of the Awatovi excavations; Awatovi was forsaken for a reason. By the time the Peabody’s initial Department of the Interior permit ran out in 1939, the site, always on tribal land, was directly under Hopi control. The tribe chose not to renew the permit. The Awatovi Expedition opened during the Great Depression and was closed by a world war and changing circumstances."

American archaeologist Richard B. Woodbury, part of the expedition under J. O. Brew, later wrote that "Because of World War II most of the reports for the Awatovi Expedition were not published until later, but by 1978 eleven reports started to appear. published a report on the Awatovi expedition. A "final" report for the Awatovi Expedition has never been written." Woodbury wrote his dissertation on the stone tool artifacts used by prehistoric Northeastern Arizonans.

"The multidisciplinary project attracted professional and avocational scholars from a wide range of disciplines. Former lawyer Watson Smith was, at the time, an enthusiastic amateur archaeologist. He joined the expedition as a volunteer during the 1936 season and became one of its most productive researchers, as well as one of the Southwest's foremost archaeological scholars. In this classic volume [9] of the Peabody Museum Papers series, first published in 1952, Smith reported on the remarkable painted murals found at Awatovi and other Puebloan sites in the underground ceremonial chambers known as kivas."

“For several years, Museum of Northern Arizona (MNA) researchers and associates have been studying the mural and pottery paintings of Hopi and other Pueblos, with an eye toward developing a traveling exhibit. The project, formerly known as the Southwest Mural Project, was put on hold in 2003 while the MNA board reviewed the project’s progress and worked to obtain a memorandum of understanding with the Hopi Tribe." "MNA and the Hopi Tribe signed the MOU in March of 2005 which, in part, allowed the project to move forward.”

== See also ==
- List of National Historic Landmarks in Arizona
- National Register of Historic Places listings in Navajo County, Arizona
