= Hester A. Davis =

American archaeologist (1930–2014)

Hester Ashmead Davis
- Marked Tree, Arkansas, 1969
- Born: June 4, 1930; Ayer, Massachusetts
- Died: December 30, 2014 (aged 84); Fayetteville, Arkansas
- Occupation: archaeologist
- Years active: 1959-1999
- Known for: Arkansas's first State Archaeologist

Hester A. Davis (1930–2014) was an American archaeologist. Arkansas' first State Archaeologist, she was instrumental in creating national public policy and conservancy standards for cultural preservation as well as developing professional and ethical standards for archaeologists. She was the recipient of numerous awards and honors, including two distinguished service awards and induction into the Arkansas Women's Hall of Fame.

== Early life ==
Hester Ashmead Davis was born on June 4, 1930, in Ayer, Massachusetts to Dorothy Canning (née Thomas) and Edward Mott Davis. Her grandfather was William Morris Davis, a renowned geographer and geomorphologist and her great-great grandmother was Lucretia Mott, Quaker abolitionist and women’s rights activist. Davis was the youngest of five siblings and grew up spending summers on her parents' apple farm in Shirley, Massachusetts and winters in Winter Park, Florida, where their father taught natural history at Rollins College. Davis' father died when she was twelve and the death had a strong impact upon her. Unhappy and doing poorly at school in Winter Park, when she failed algebra in her first year of high school, she was enrolled at Northfield School for Girls.

A summer trip after her graduation, spurred Davis' interest in history and archaeology, prompting her to enroll to study history and anthropology at Rollins College. By that time, Davis' brother Mott was working as an archaeologist at the University of Nebraska and her sister Penny, who had worked at the Peabody Museum of Archaeology and Ethnology at Harvard University, suggested the Peabody as a potential employer. Davis wrote to them and was accepted for the Upper Gila Expedition in 1950. Her primary duties were drawing artifacts and record keeping. Returning to Rollins in the fall, Davis led a successful protest against the college administrators for budget irregularities. She returned to the Gila Expedition the following summer and worked on organizing the lab and record keeping, before completing her Bachelor of Arts in history in 1952, earning Algernon Sydney Sullivan Medallion for her leadership and academic accomplishments.

Davis' next summer job before starting graduate school, was on the Smithsonian Institution's River Basin Surveys and then she spent the next two years studying physical and cultural anthropology at the University of Oregon under Homer Barnett, serving as a research assistant to Bill Laughlin. She went to Oregon because John Otis Brew, who led the Gila Expedition had warned her that there were few opportunities for women in archaeology. Luther Cressman, who headed Oregon's program was a rare exception, allowing women to do field work. Though she went to Oregon because of Cressman, she never studied with him. In 1954, Davis enrolled at Haverford College and earned a master's degree in social and technical assistance the following year, before moving on to the University of North Carolina to complete a master's degree in anthropology in 1957.

== Career ==
Davis' first position after finishing school was as a cultural anthropologist working at the University of Iowa for the Institute for Agricultural Medicine. The observation of a farming community and families took place over the next thirteen months and was funded by the Kellogg Foundation. After making her first report of finding to the American Anthropological Association on her findings in Iowa, Davis moved to Arkansas to accept a position in mid-1959 as a research assistant for the University of Arkansas' newly developed archaeological museum. The following year, she began teaching anthropology and a museum methods course and helped to organize the Arkansas Archaeological Society to help curb looting and destruction of archaeological sites. Between 1959 and 1966, the university along with the Society, unsuccessfully attempted to pass an antiquities act to protect sites on state land, but when Winthrop Rockefeller was elected governor, he backed legislation to create the Arkansas Archaeological Survey and the position of State Archaeologist. Davis was appointed as the first State Archaeologist in Arkansas.

Davis immediately began work to combat the Soil Conservation Service policy to level large tracts of land for farming purposes, arranging conferences to discuss the devastation the policy was causing to Archaic and Mississippian cultural sites. She invited John Maxwell Corbett, Chief Archaeologist of the National Park Service, to give talks. From these discussions and others like it, a national movement began to push for and create the National Historic Preservation Act, the National Register of Historic Places, and the Archeological and Historic Preservation Act of 1974. Davis became an outspoken leader in the drive for ethical stewardship and conservation with several publications including the booklet, "These Are the Stewards of the Past" (1970), "Is There a Future for the Past" (1971) and the "Airlie House Report". She helped found the Society of Professional Archaeologists, American Society for Conservation Archaeology, the National Association of State Archaeologists, as well as establish the certification processes for professionals and development of the Registry of Professional Archaeologists. Davis' contribution to federal policy in the area of cultural and archaeological preservation has been widely recognized, including her work behind the scenes coaching male colleagues in their presentations to legislatures. Don D. Fowler, one-time president of the Society for American Archaeology stated that the laws requiring government agencies to investigate whether a construction project might harm archaeological sites and call in experts before digging would not "have happened without Hester", he went on to call her a "national treasure".

Beginning in 1965, Davis served as the editor of The Arkansas Archeologist, a post she held until 2008. From 1974–1991, she taught graduate courses on public archaeology and led the logistics, including organizing field excavation, laboratory processing, seminars and site surveys, for the Arkansas Training Program for Avocational Archaeologists to teach basic professional skills to enthusiasts. In 1995, Davis was appointed to serve on the Cultural Property Advisory Committee by President Bill Clinton and served for six years. She retired in 1999 from the University of Arkansas as a full professor and created an endowment, the Davis Internship in Public Archeology, to assist students in earning graduate degrees in anthropology. During her lifetime, she served on the boards of numerous state, regional, national and international preservation and archaeological organizations.

Davis died on December 30, 2014, in Fayetteville, Arkansas.

== Awards and honors ==
In 1987, Rollins College presented Davis with an honorary doctorate and in 1996 recognized her with their Distinguished Alumna Award. In 1994, the Society of Professional Archaeologists honored her with the Seiberling Award for public service and the Society for American Archaeology presented her with the Distinguished Service Award for Excellence in Cultural Resource Management. Davis and Charles R. McGimsey were the first honorees and co-recipients of an award named in their honor by the Register of Professional Archaeologists for Distinguished Service. In 2006, she was jointly awarded, along with William Lipe, and McGimsey, the Conservation and Heritage Management Award from the Archaeological Institute of America for their national and international contributions to archaeology. Posthumously, she was inducted in the inaugural group of women into the Arkansas Women's Hall of Fame in 2015.
