= Point of Pines Sites =

Archaeological sites in Arizona, United States

- U.S. National Register of Historic Places
- U.S. National Historic Landmark
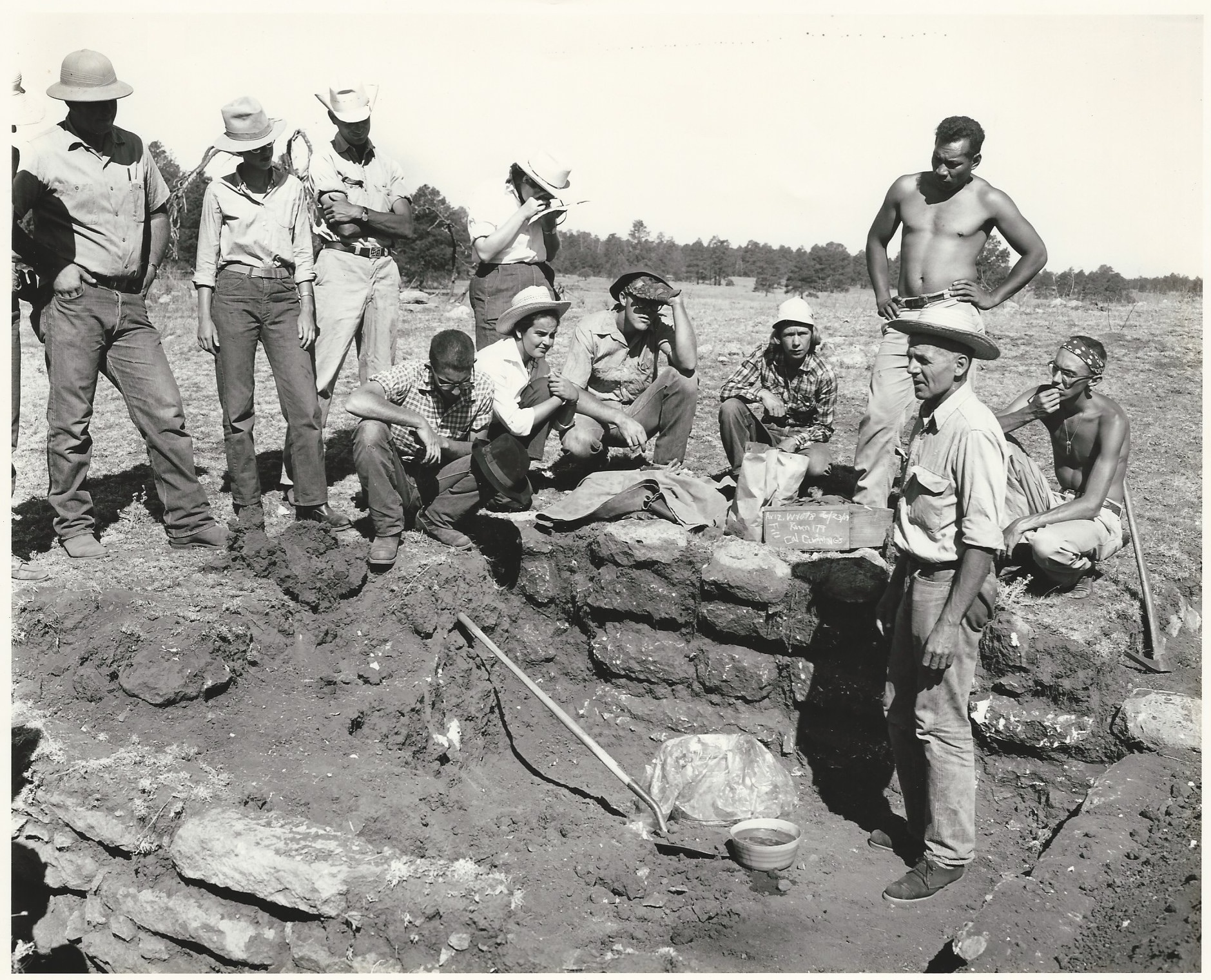
- Hugh Carson Cutler at Point of Pines Field School

- Location within Arizona Location within the United States
- Location: San Carlos Apache Indian Reservation, Graham County, Arizona, USA
- Nearest city: San Carlos, Arizona
- NRHP reference No.: 66000182

Significant dates
- Added to NRHP: October 15, 1966
- Designated NHL: July 19, 1964

The Point of Pines Sites are a set of archaeological sites on the San Carlos Apache Indian Reservation in the U.S. state of Arizona. Located around the settlement of Point of Pines, they are significant for associations with Ancestral Pueblo, Mogollon and Hohokam cultures. The sites were chosen as a field school location by Dr. Emil Haury because of the unusual presence of all three major prehistoric cultures of Arizona. The field school ran from 1946 to 1960, collecting large amounts of evidence from numerous sites. The site were collectively declared a National Historic Landmark in 1964. American anthropologist Richard B. Woodbury participated in the field school.

Point of Pines is a region in the eastern interior area of the San Carlos Reservation, occupying a high plain bounded by the Nantack Ridge and the Willow Mountains. The Nantack Ridge is a deeply folded escarpment, and it and the plain above have extensive evidence of prehistoric occupation for an extended period of time. Due to this wealth of archaeological material, it also a good location for continuing research that had begun by the University of Arizona at Kinishba and Forestdale. For most of its early history the sites in the area fit the model of the Mogollon Culture identified by Haury and others. Later on, after the 13th century there was apparently an influx of Anasazi from the Colorado Plateau and possibly the Hohokam of the Safford region.

The presence of Jeddito ware, a pottery type associated with the Hopi heartland, indicates at least trade with that area if not actual movement of people. Terah Smiley, a student of Haury's at Point of Pines, excavated and identified the rectangular Western Pueblo style kiva, forms of which are still in use today, at several of the sites.

== See also ==
- List of National Historic Landmarks in Arizona
- National Register of Historic Places listings in Graham County, Arizona
