= Richard Woodbury =

Richard Woodbury may refer to:

- Richard B. Woodbury (1917–2009), American archeologist
- Richard G. Woodbury (born 1961), American politician from Maine
