= Gila Pueblo Archaeological Foundation =

Former U.S. archaeological research organization

Gila Pueblo logo

The Gila Pueblo Archaeological Foundation was a research organization dedicated to conducting archaeological research in the American Southwest and surrounding areas. It was founded in 1928 in Globe, Arizona, by Harold S. Gladwin and his wife, Winifred (McCurdy) Gladwin. The foundation ceased operations in 1950.

== Beginning ==
Harold S. Gladwin was a former New York City stockbroker who eventually left his position and moved to Santa Barbara, California. In Santa Barbara, he met his future wife, Winifred, and William North Duane, who introduced Gladwin to his cousin, the archaeologist A.V. Kidder. Gladwin spent two field seasons with Kidder in northern Arizona, during which his passion and curiosity for the Southwest grew. This experience ultimately inspired him to establish the Gila Pueblo Archaeological Foundation.

== Research ==
With Harold S. Gladwin's backing and funding, the Gila Pueblo Archaeological Foundation was able to conduct extensive excavations and research throughout the American Southwest. One of the most significant contributions made by the foundation was the definition of the Hohokam culture, a task in which the young archaeologist Emil Haury played a key role. In 1930, Haury became the assistant director of Gila Pueblo. Another major accomplishment of the foundation was the identification and definition of the Cochise culture.

In 1950, Gila Pueblo ceased operations and donated its collection to the Arizona State Museum, located on the University of Arizona campus. The collection was unveiled in 1951 during the inauguration of University of Arizona President Richard A. Harvill. The records of the foundation are held by the Arizona State Museum Library & Archives, with the finding aid available on Arizona Archives Online. The building that housed the foundation, now part of Eastern Arizona College, is listed on the National Register of Historic Places.
