= Sage Memorial Hospital School of Nursing =

- Sage Memorial School of Nursing
- U.S. National Register of Historic Places
- U.S. National Historic Landmark District
- Sage Memorial Hospital, ca. 1935

- Location within Arizona Location within the United States
- Location: Jct. AZ 264 and 291, Navajo Reservation, Ganado, Arizona
- Coordinates: 35°42′40″N 109°32′36″W
- Area: 160 acres (65 ha)
- Built: 1930
- Architect: Presbyterian Board of Home Missions
- Architectural style: Mission Colonial Revival
- NRHP reference No.: 09000082

Significant dates
- Added to NRHP: January 16, 2009
- Designated NHLD: January 16, 2009

Sage Memorial Hospital School of Nursing in Ganado, Arizona was designated a U.S. National Historic Landmark on January 16, 2009.

The press release read:

Sage Memorial Hospital School of Nursing, Ganado Mission, AZ, the first accredited nursing program for Native American women in the United States, Sage Memorial Hospital School of Nursing provided Native American women with a professional nursing education. The school was a landmark institution in changing white attitudes toward the abilities of Native American people. The school attracted both Native American women as well as women from other minority groups. Eventually students representing over 50 different Native American tribes, as well as women of Mexican, Spanish, Inuit, Japanese, Filipino, and Chinese descent enrolled in the training program. The school's diverse population clearly illustrates that access to an accredited nursing education was not, at that time, generally available within the United States to non-white students.

The education provided at Sage Memorial Hospital School of Nursing was of such a high quality that many white parents agitated to have their daughters admitted to the school. However, the director of Sage Memorial Hospital School of Nursing, Dr. Clarence G. Salsbury, made a calculated decision to maintain a nursing training program solely for minority students. This decision, made at a time when public education was actively segregated and minority children were refused entry to white schools, provides a unique and different insight into the doctrine of separate but equal educational opportunities.

== History ==
=== Ganado Mission: Hospital, Nursing School, School and Church ===
Presbyterian missionaries began work at Ganado in 1901. Local trader Don Lorenzo Hubbell helped them obtain land and gave them the use of a small house near his store. The first pastor was Charles Bierkemper. Mrs. Bierkemper started a school in the living room of that home while her husband was overseeing the building of a church and a manse. In 1910, Dr. James D. Kennedy arrived to serve the small community, visiting patients on foot and by buggy. The three-fold thrust of the Presbyterian Mission was in place.

By the mid 1920s the school, now housed in part of the church, had grown by several grades. Medical work was carried on from a small twelve-bed hospital. In 1927, Dr. Clarence G. Salsbury arrived. He supervised the building of a new 75-bed hospital which opened its doors in 1930 under the name of Sage Memorial Hospital, a tribute to the major donors for the project, the Russell Sage Foundation. By 1930 the school had become a complete elementary-high institution, graduating its first three seniors. In the same year, Salsbury started a school for Native nurses. Only women from minority groups were accepted. In 1933 the first two nursing students completed their studies, passed the state boards, and became RN's.

During World War II years, many of the graduates of Sage Memorial School of Nursing served with honor in the military. Ganado High School graduates also served, as well as a number of students who had not finished and who later came back to complete their schooling. Several Code Talkers were among them.

After the war, minority youth, especially those who had served, found easier acceptance into higher education everywhere. In order to broaden their experience, Sage Memorial was sending students to other hospitals for certain specialized training. After graduating the class of 1951, Sage Memorial Hospital School of Nursing closed. The staff helped the remaining undergraduates transfer to good schools, and nursing continued to be a career chosen by many Native Americans.

Small public schools under state supervision had been growing across the Reservation, at first serving English only students, both Anglo and Navajo. In addition, Navajo parents could now keep their children at home and send them to school on a bus. Government day schools were closing. By the mid 1960s Ganado Public School was an elementary-high system, a competitor for the Mission school. In 1970 Ganado Mission High School graduated its last class, and the College of Ganado came into existence.

Many of the leaders for the Navajo Tribe in early years and after World War II came from church sponsored schools: the Presbyterians at Ganado, the Methodists in Farmington, the Catholics at St. Michaels, and the Christian Reformed at Rehoboth near Gallup. The last two still exist. However, young people who attended the much-maligned BIA schools did also become important members of the tribe, working for their people.

Also under the pressure of changing times, in 1969, Sage Memorial Hospital was turned over to Project Hope. Hope had been successful around the globe in getting third-world medical systems in order. They projected that in five years they could prepare Sage Memorial Hospital to be locally run, and by 1974 Sage Memorial was under the control of a local board, the Navajo Nation Health Foundation, though this name was somewhat misleading because it was not under tribal control. This time, Hope did not succeed; despite considerable help from the Indian Health Service, in 1986 the hospital was turned over to a for-profit company.

The college was not a success and lasted only until 1986. Many of the campus buildings remain, most under the control of Sage Memorial, three under control of the local Presbyterian Church, which continues to be active, but with a smaller congregation. The Public School has become a large institution and the main provider of jobs in a still small community.

The Alumni Association of Ganado Mission High School has survived and continued to meet every two years. It now includes nursing school alums, retired staff from all campus areas, neighbors from government and public schools, traders, spouses, and children of all these people – anyone who spent time at Ganado and wants to maintain old friendships. It is now called the Ganado Mission Association. The campus is in poor condition.

In 2009 Sage Memorial Hospital School of Nursing was declared a National Historic Landmark. A granite monument on the campus pays tribute to the minority women who trained there. All of their names appear under the year of their graduation. The National Park Service, through its staff at Hubbell Trading Post National Historic Site, watches over it.

== See also ==
- National Register of Historic Places listings in Apache County, Arizona
- List of National Historic Landmarks in Arizona
