= Harold S. Gladwin =

American anthropologist, archaeologist and stockbroker (1883–1983)

Harold Sterling Gladwin (1883–1983) was an American archaeologist, anthropologist, and stockbroker.

== Introduction ==
Harold Sterling Gladwin was an early twentieth century archaeologist that specialized in Southwestern archaeology of the United States. He also was known for his excavations at Snaketown, Arizona, in which he accomplished several publications on this topic; his theories on migration to the New World from Asia also gained attention.

== Background ==
Born in New York City in 1883, Gladwin worked in the city as a stockbroker from 1908 to 1922, his first successful career. However, in 1922 he decided to move west to California, and there he began work at the Santa Barbara Museum of Natural History, taking a special interest in the mutations of butterflies. Gladwin's interest in insects was soon replaced with an interest in American archaeology and, by 1924, he had become friends with A.V. Kidder, the noted archaeologist of the Southwestern United States; from this point on, Gladwin's work was in archaeology.

== Early work ==
Taking special interest in pottery sherds and other refuse, Gladwin began to piece together theories on Hohokam culture as he excavated Casa Grande in 1927 in Arizona. Finding that the local Hohokam red-on-buff pottery artifacts were mixed with polychromes of the Salado Culture, Gladwin wondered how and why the two distinctive pottery types were together with no evidence for conflict between the Hohokam cultures of the Gila Basin and the Salado cultures of the Tonto Basin. Gladwin's excavations in southern Arizona helped to renew an interest in this area that had been nearly forgotten since Frank Cushing had done his own excavations there in the late nineteenth century. In 1928, Harold and his future wife, Winifred, founded the Gila Pueblo Archaeological Foundation over the remains of a pueblo that the two had excavated together. As work in the area grew, the Gladwins began to move around the Southwest in search of clues about the origins of the prehistoric inhabitants. The Arizona State Museum Library & Archives holds the records to the Gila Pueblo Archaeological Foundation. The finding aid for this collection is located on Arizona Archives Online.

== New Method devised ==
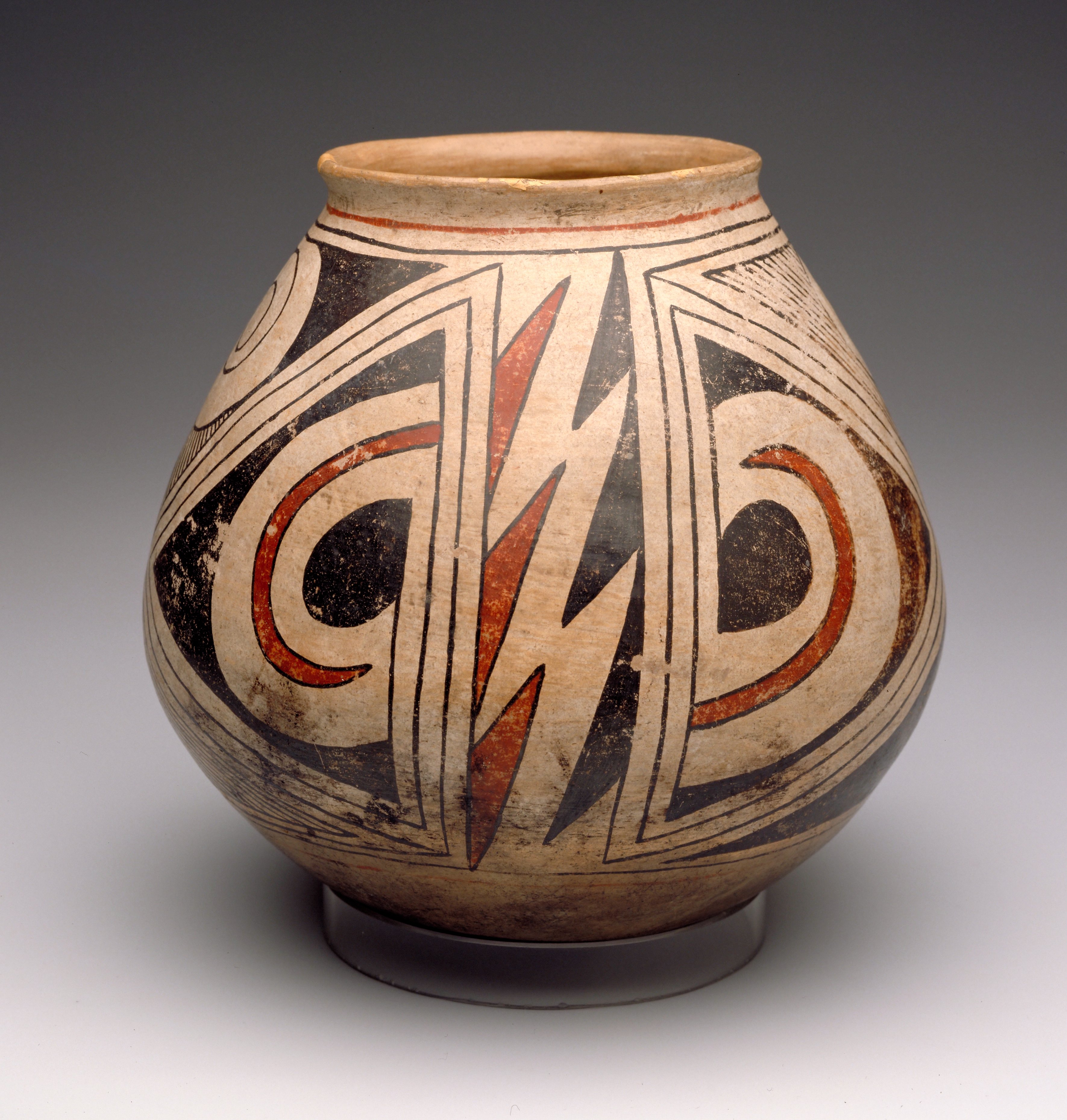
Casas Grandes olla, donated by Gladwin to the Minneapolis Institute of Art

From the Gila Pueblo, the Gladwins conducted research on Southwestern prehistory for over twenty years before donating the facility to the University of Arizona in 1951. In the years while they conducted their research, Harold Gladwin and his wife traveled throughout the Southwest conducting numerous excavations at sites such as: Snaketown, near Phoenix, Casa Grande, Flagstaff, Chaco Canyon, and various places throughout Arizona, New Mexico, Colorado, and Texas. Through their numerous excavations, the two came up with a new “method for designation of cultures,” which included taking a look at the current linguistic “stocks” of the area and, through a system of roots stems, branches, phases, and terms, putting these “stocks” into a context of patterns of the Southwestern region.

== The Snaketown excavations ==
Arguably Gladwin's most famous excavations took place outside Phoenix at a place called Snaketown, which delved into the Hohokam culture. After having a chance meeting with the descendants of this culture in 1927, Gladwin wanted to find the roots of these people that the Pima referred to as Hohokam, or “those who had gone.” Finding that these people had left little behind in terms of their modes of travel and pathways, Gladwin found difficulty in locating clues to their culture while he was in the Gila Basin. After visiting numerous prehistoric sites (in his own words, thousands of sites), Gladwin and his colleagues decided upon Snaketown as their focal point for excavations into this culture. The team decided that this site would be the most rewarding, for it had been relatively untouched by others, especially looters. The excavation began in 1934, and the first results were published four years later. In the first publication, Gladwin and his team took a special interest in the various types of pottery, figurines, stone tools, and shells, and the reference to each time period that they could identify. This site remained a focus for Gladwin for years to come, and he reevaluated his results and republished his works on this site many times in order to better comprehend and better inform the archaeological community of its importance. Taking into account the rapid increase of information about Southwestern cultures and the increase in accuracy of dating methods, Gladwin admitted that he and his team originally had made some judgments and suppositions incompatible with the current criteria of now eleven years later. This publication exemplifies Gladwin's commitment to the field of archaeology, for in his publications he typically admitted where he had gone wrong, and where he needed to keep an open mind in his work. It was through his constant revisions and republications that Gladwin was able to help decipher the lost culture of the Hohokam.

The Snaketown excavations are now protected by the Hohokam Pima National Monument. Most of the archaeological excavations were backfilled to protect the site for future research. A scale model of the original Snaketown community is held at the Heard Museum in Phoenix, while artifacts from excavations are housed in the Arizona State Museum in Tucson.

== Publications and excavations ==
Gladwin kept publishing on various important archaeological topics throughout his life, up until 1975. Some of his most read works include: Tree Ring Analysis, The Eastern Range of the Red-On-Buff Culture, A Review and Analysis of the Flagstaff Culture, Men out of Asia, Excavations at Snaketown: Material Culture, and The Chaco Branch Excavations at White Mound and in the Red Mesa. Of these publications, Tree Ring Analysis was revised and republished many times by Gladwin, as he would argue with the methods of other archaeologists, or learn more detail into the art of tree ring dating. Particularly in his 1946 publication on the problems of tree ring dating, Gladwin used his own data from the Gila Basin to dispute dates that A.E. Douglass had prescribed to certain archaeological evidence. While Gladwin consistently sought out information that prescribed to his own view of dendrochronology, to this day, he is seen as somewhat of a novice on the topic. One of Gladwin's most famous publications was Men out of Asia. In this novel-like publication, Gladwin describes his view on anthropology, and proposes a theory on the origins of peoples in the Americas, as a result of “multitudinous migrations.”

== Selected publications ==
- Gladwin, Harold S. and Winifred. “A Method for Designation of Cultures and Their Variation.” Medallion Papers. Lancaster Press, Inc., Lancaster, PA; 1934: pp. 1–10.
- Gladwin, Harold S. and Winifred; Haury; and Sayles. “Excavations at Snaketown: Material Culture.” Medallion Papers. Gila Pueblo, Globe, Arizona; 1938: pp. 1–11.
- Gladwin, Harold Sterling. “Excavations at Snaketown: Reviews and Conclusions.” Medallion Papers. Gila Pueblo, Globe, Arizona; 1948: pp. 1–5.
- Gladwin, Harold Sterling. “Tree Ring Analysis: Problems of Dating.” Medallion Papers. Gila Pueblo, Globe, Arizona; 1946: pp. 1–21.
- Gladwin, Harold Sterling. “Tree Ring Analysis: Tree-rings and Droughts.” Medallion Papers. Gila Pueblo, Globe, Arizona; 1952: pp 1–33.
- Gladwin, Harold S. and Winifred. “The Eastern Range of the Red-On-Buff Culture.” Medallion Papers. Gila Pueblo, Globe, Arizona; 1935: pp. 1–277.
- Gladwin, Harold Sterling. “A Review and Analysis of the Flagstaff Culture.” Medallion Papers, Gila Pueblo, Globe, Arizona; 1943: pp. 1–69.
- Gladwin, Harold Sterling. Men Out of Asia. Whittlesey House, New York City; 1947: pp. vii–361.
- Gladwin, Harold S. and Winifred; Haury; and Sayles. “Excavations at Snaketown: Material Culture.” Medallion Papers. Gila Pueblo, Globe, Arizona; 1938: pp. 1–289.
- Gladwin, Harold Sterling. “The Chaco Branch Excavations at White Mound and in the Red Mesa Valley.” Medallion Papers. Gila Pueblo, Globe, Arizona; 1945: pp. 1–152.

== See also ==
- Pre-Columbian trans-oceanic contact theories
