= List of National Natural Landmarks in Arizona =

From the list of National Natural Landmarks, these are the National Natural Landmarks in Arizona. There are 10 in total.

Arizona National Natural Landmarks (clickable map)

Name	Image	Date	Location	County	Ownership	Description
Barfoot Park		2011	31°54′54.32″N 109°18′7.26″W	Cochise	Federal (Coronado National Forest)	One of the best U.S. examples of Madrean-influenced ponderosa pine forests.
Barringer Meteor Crater		1967	35°1′38″N 111°1′21″W	Coconino	Private	The world's first identified meteor crater.
Canelo Hills Cienega Reserve		1974	31°33′44.09″N 110°31′33.07″W	Santa Cruz	Private (The Nature Conservancy)	Notable for the extremely rare Canelo Ladies Tresses Orchid and the Gila chub.
Comb Ridge	Comb Ridge	1976	36.8188°N 110.0572°W	Navajo	Communal lands (Navajo Nation)	The only known location for tritylodont fossils in North America.
Grapevine Mesa		1967	35.974431°N 114.081636°W	Mohave	Federal (Bureau of Land Management)	The best existing display of Joshua trees in the United States.
Kaibab Squirrel Area		1965	36°24′0.6″N 112°9′11.11″W	Coconino	Federal (Kaibab National Forest)	Illustrative of the habitat for the Kaibab squirrel.
Onyx Cave		1974	31°43′3″N 110°46′9″W	Santa Cruz	Federal (Coronado National Forest)	Considered to be the finest cave in Arizona.
Patagonia-Sonoita Creek	Patagonia-Sonoita Creek	1970	31°31′40.83″N 110°46′31.65″W	Santa Cruz	Private (The Nature Conservancy)	An example of a cottonwood-willow riparian forest and one of the last permanent stream-bottom habitat areas in southern Arizona.
Ramsey Canyon	Ramsey Canyon	1965	31°26′52.05″N 110°18′25.88″W	Cochise	Private (The Nature Conservancy)	A stream-cut, vertical-sided gorge.
Willcox Playa		1966	32°8′27.6″N 109°50′52.8″W	Cochise	Federal (Bureau of Land Management)	The largest "dry lake" in Arizona.

== See also ==
- List of National Historic Landmarks in Arizona
