= Klagetoh (Leegito) Chapter House =

- U.S. National Register of Historic Places
- U.S. National Historic Landmark
- Location within Arizona Location within the United States
- Location: Klagetoh, Arizona
- Coordinates: 35°29′58″N 109°31′48″W
- Area: 0.4 acres (0.16 ha)
- Built: 1963
- NRHP reference No.: 100006279

Significant dates
- Added to NRHP: January 13, 2021
- Designated NHL: January 13, 2021

The Klagetoh (Leeyi´ tó) Chapter House is a historic chapter house of the Navajo Nation in Klagetoh, Arizona. The landmark building is significant for its association with Annie Dodge Wauneka (1910–1997), a leading figure in local chapter and Navajo Nation affairs and role model for women's involvement Navajo affairs. Built in 1963, it is one of the few surviving permanent structures associated with Wauneka's life. It was designated a National Historic Landmark in 2021, and continues to serve the area community as a meeting place.

== Description and history ==
The Klagetoh Chapter House is located in the small community of Klagetoh, roughly midway between Ganado and Chambers on United States Route 191. The chapter house is set west of the highway, with a landscaped courtyard dedicated to Navajo Nation military members. The building is a single-story stone structure, built out of local sandstone by chapter members. It is square in shape, with a shallow pitch pyramidal roof that has a cupola at the center. Its main entrance faces east in a traditional Navajo orientation. Most of the building interior is taken up by a large meeting space, with restrooms, kitchen, and storage areas to one side. A massive stone fireplace occupies one end of the room, with a raised rostrum area at the other end.

Annie Dodge Wauneka was a prominent figure in the Klagetoh Chapter of the Navajo Nation. In addition to her leading role (from 1951 to 1979) on the Navajo Nation Council, she was regularly active in chapter activities. She was instrumental in raising the funds for the construction of this building, and in influencing the design to include traditional Navajo materials and design elements.

== See also ==
- National Register of Historic Places listings in Apache County, Arizona
- List of National Historic Landmarks in Arizona
