= Emil Haury =

American archaeologist (1904–1992)

Emil Walter Haury
- Emil Walter Haury
- Born: May 2, 1904; Newton, Kansas
- Died: December 5, 1992 (aged 88); Tucson, Arizona
- Known for: Snaketown, a Hohokam site in Arizona
- Awards: Viking Fund Medal (1950)
- Scientific career
- Fields: archaeology
- Workplaces: University of Arizona
- Doctoral students: Vance Haynes

Emil Walter "Doc" Haury (May 2, 1904 in Newton, Kansas – December 5, 1992 in Tucson, Arizona) was an American archaeologist who specialized in the archaeology of the American Southwest. He is most famous for his work at Snaketown, a Hohokam site in Arizona.

== Early years ==
Emil was the youngest of four children born to Professor Gustav A. Haury and Clara K. Ruth Haury. Gustav was a professor at Bethel College a Mennonite college in Newton. When they were both six, Emil Haury met his future first wife, Hulda Penner, when she and her family visited Newton from a nearby Mennonite community.

== College career ==
After graduating high school in 1923, Emil then attended the University of Arizona where he earned his bachelor's degree in 1927 and his M.A. in 1928. It was during the 1928–29 school year that he earned his first teaching position. In 1934 Haury earned his PhD from Harvard University.

== Field work and experience ==
One of the first field experiences came in 1925. That year he was apprenticed to Byron Cummings, A.E. Douglass, and Harold Gladwin where their major work occurred at Cuicuilco right outside of Mexico City. It was at this time that he became one of Cummings' (who was at the time the acting university president) most important assistants. It was through connections made through Cummings that Haury was in attendance at the first Pecos Conference in 1927.

== Gila Pueblo ==
In 1928 the New York stockbroker turned archaeologist Harold Gladwin along with Winifred McCurdy started the Gila Pueblo Archaeological Foundation. In 1930 Haury became the assistant director at Gila Pueblo. During his time with Gila he was able to expand his work throughout Arizona and New Mexico. It was through this extensive research that Haury became part of the group that was to define the Hohokam culture. Thus, it helped Haury in eventually defining the Mogollon culture.

With the assistance and support from Gladwin, Haury was able to conduct large amounts of field research and publish reports. The 1930s was a time of plenty for Haury and when some of his most famous research was conducted. Some of the excavations he conducted included the Tusayan Ruins, Canyon Creek Ruin, Mogollon, and Harris Village, and arguably his most famous research at Snaketown.

Between his extensive work with Gila Pueblo, Haury also managed to earn his PhD from Harvard. His dissertation dealt with the excavations by Frank Hamilton Cushing at Los Muertos, a Hohokam site in Arizona.

== Paleoindians in the Southwest ==
One of Haury's passions that lasted throughout his career was the presence of Paleoindians in the Southwest. He conducted several excavations at Paleoindian sites and subsequently wrote several papers on the subject. In 1926 Pleistocene megafauna hunting in the Southwest was proven by the discoveries at Folsom, New Mexico. That same year Haury alongside Cummings began excavations at Whitewater Draw in southeastern Arizona where they excavated a mammoth skeleton which was above a deposit of artifacts from the Cochise culture. This was Haury's first experience with Paleoindian archaeology in the Southwest.

=== Ventana Cave ===
During the late 1930s and early 1940s excavations, led by Julian Hayden and Haury, were conducted in the area of Ventana Cave in Arizona. Ventana Cave is a rock shelter with extensive stratigraphy of which the lowest layer was attributed to the Cochise culture while upper layers were attributed to more recent inhabitants. The impact of the work done by Haury and others at Vetnana cave helped in the understanding of Paleoindians in the Southwest.

=== Naco site ===
In April 1952, Haury excavated the Naco Mammoth Kill Site near Naco, Arizona, finding the fossilized bones of a mammoth that had been killed by at least 8 Clovis points about 10,000 years ago. The Naco site was the first Clovis mammoth kill association to be identified.

=== Lehner Ranch ===
The Lehner Ranch site is a mammoth kill site in the San Pedro Valley in Cochise County in southeast Arizona. In 1952 Haury began investigating an arroyo where a rancher, Edward F. Lehner, had observed bones sticking out from a deep layer. These bones were identified as mammoth bones. After excavating several projectile points were found in situ with the mammoth bones. Also a hearth was discovered. Lehner Ranch became another one of Haury's seminal works in Southwestern Paleoindian archaeology.

== Hohokam ==
Haury's work with the Hohokam began in 1930 when he joined Gila Pueblo. There were many questions surrounding discoveries in southern Arizona beginning with A.V. Kidder in the early 20th century to Harold and Winifred Gladwin's work up through 1930s. One of Haury's first projects after becoming the Assistant director of Gila Pueblo was to investigate a site known as Roosevelt 9:6. The importance of understanding the Hohokam was extremely important to Haury and one of his most famous projects was at Snaketown where he conducted extensive excavations and on which he eventually wrote a book. Haury was the first to claim that the Hohokam were decedents of the Paleoindian Cochise culture. Haury was also a critical figure in the chronology of the Hohokam because of his work in establishing a timeline for the Pioneer period Hohokam. Haury was also a proponent of the idea that the Hohokam had contact with Mesoamerica.

=== Roosevelt 9:6 ===
The Roosevelt 9:6 site was a Colonial Period Hohokam site near the Salt River north of Globe, Arizona. The site came to the attention of archaeologists when pottery sherds and cremations were exposed by the recession of Roosevelt Lake. Working for Gila Pueblo alongside the Gladwins, Haury published an extensive and detailed report of the findings. This report along with those published by the Gladwins, were important in the establishment of ceramic typologies, burial techniques, and lifeways of the Hohokam.

=== Snaketown ===
By the 1960s there was a lot of controversy surrounding the Hohokam and where they fit or didn't fit chronologically. Haury decided then to re-visit a site where Gladwin had first conducted research in the 1930s. Snaketown was the epitomes Hohokam site. It was strategically placed in the proximity of the Gila River which then allowed for its famous irrigation system. Haury's re-examination of Snaketown was based around the hope that with the use of new technology, new research methods and ideas surrounding the Hohokam, that questions which had arisen since the first reports on Snaketown in the 1930s. In 1964 Haury began his reexamination which led to the publication in 1976 of one of the most influential works on the Hohokam, The Hohokam, Desert Farmers & Craftsmen: Excavations at Snaketown, 1964–1965.

== Mogollon ==
Arguably Haury's most important contribution to the archaeology of the American Southwest was his work in establishing a timeline and refining the definition of the Mogollon culture. Much of Haury's work was conducted in the most famous Mogollon area, the Mimbres Valley of New Mexico. Early research in the area focused on the ceramics that made the valley famous, while ignoring the underlying structures and pottery types. It was Haury who, starting in the 1930s with Gila Pueblo, began to identify and understand the timeline and uniqueness of the Mogollon from their Anasazi and Hohokam neighbors.

=== Chronology ===
Haury's research in the area allowed him to be one of the first archaeologists to definitively give the Mogollon a chronological sequence. The sequences Haury established were: Early Pit House Period (200–550 C.E), Late Pit House Period (550–1000 C.E.), and Classic Mimbres Period (1000–1130 C.E.). Haury's research and findings were paramount when establishing a larger understanding the Mogollon that happened in the 1970s, as well as understanding the role of Casas Grandes in the Mogollon sequence.

=== Mogollon Village and Harris Village ===
Mogollon and Harris Villages were very much the type sites for the Mogollon culture and are the sites that convinced Haury of its uniqueness from other Southwestern cultures.

Work began on the Mogollon Village site in 1933. It is a site on the San Francisco River north of Glenwood, New Mexico in Catron County, New Mexico. During Haury's excavations eleven houses of several types were excavated. An abundance of artifacts were uncovered including pottery, clay objects, grinding stones, projectile points, as well as several burials.

Harris Village was another site excavated around the same time as Mogollon Village. The site is located in the town of Mimbres, New Mexico near the Mimbres River about 75 miles south of Mogollon Village. Thirty-four houses were excavated with variation in shape, and function (domestic, ceremonial, storage).

After the excavation and analysis of these two sites Haury was able to establish a housing typology for the Mogollon.

== Dendrochronology ==
After becoming increasingly uncomfortable with Cummings' perspective on archaeology Haury looked for other opportunities. In 1929 he began to work for A. E. Douglass. It was in 1929 along with Douglass and several other archaeologists that a tree ring sample was uncovered in Show Low, Arizona. It was this tree ring which helped in establishing a missing link in the ability to use tree rings as dating markers, and was the watershed moment in dendrochronology. This discovery then allowed for archaeological sites in the Southwest to be more accurately dated.

== At the University of Arizona ==
In 1937 Haury went back to the University of Arizona to head the Department of Archaeology. To broaden the scope of the department Haury changed the name to the Department of Anthropology. As well as holding his position at the university, Haury also took on the role of Director of the Arizona State Museum, which he held until 1964. The Arizona State Museum Library & Archives currently holds the Emil Haury Papers in its collections. Even after retiring, Haury kept an office at the University of Arizona and went there almost every weekday for most of the rest of his life.

== Writings ==
Throughout his career Haury published many papers and several books on archaeology and the Southwest.

=== Books ===
- The Stratigraphy & Archaeology of Ventana Cave (1950) ISBN 978-0-8165-0536-4
- The Hohokam, Desert Farmers & Craftsmen: Excavations at Snaketown, 1964–1965 (1976) ISBN 978-0-8165-0445-9
- Mogollon Culture in the Forestdale Valley, East-Central Arizona (1985) ISBN 978-0-8165-0894-5
- Emil W. Haury's Prehistory of the American Southwest (1986) ISBN 978-0-8165-0896-9
- Point of Pines Arizona: A History of the University of Arizona Archaeological Field School (1989) ISBN 978-0-8165-1096-2

=== Papers ===
- "Tree Rings: The Archaeologist's Time-Piece", American Antiquity, Vol. 1, No. 2., pp. 98–108 (1935)
- "The Stratigraphy of Ventana Cave, Arizona", American Antiquity, Vol. 8, No. 3., pp. 218–223 (1943)
- "Artifacts With Mammoth Remains, Naco, Arizona", American Antiquity, Vol. 19, No. 1., pp. 1–24 (1953)
- "The Lehner Mammoth Site, Southeastern Arizona", American Antiquity, Vol. 25, No. 1., pp. 2–20 (with E.B. Sayles and William W. Wasley) (1959)

== Legacy ==
On December 5, 1992, Haury died of a heart ailment in Tucson, Arizona. The New York Times remembered him as, "an archeologist and anthropologist who was influential in the study of the prehistory of the American Southwest." Haury was a member of the United States National Academy of Sciences (1956), the American Academy of Arts and Sciences (1960), and the American Philosophical Society (1969). In 2004, a centennial issue of the Journal of the Southwest celebrating Haury's life and career was released. It includes examples of Haury's own artwork, which he used to illustrate both his field notes and letters to his future wife, Hulda.
