= Ventana Cave =

Archaeological site in Arizona, United States

- U.S. National Register of Historic Places
- U.S. National Historic Landmark
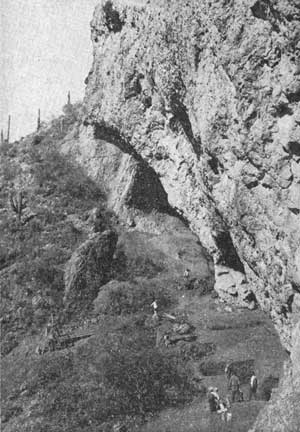
- Ventana Cave

- Location within Arizona Location within the United States
- Location: Pima County, Arizona, United States
- Nearest city: Santa Rosa, Arizona
- Coordinates: 32°21′N 112°14′W
- NRHP reference No.: 66000189

Significant dates
- Added to NRHP: October 15, 1966
- Designated NHL: January 20, 1964

Ventana Cave (O'odham: Nakaijegel) is an archaeological site in southern Arizona. It is located on the Tohono O'odham Nation. The cave was excavated under the direction of Emil Haury by teams led by Julian Hayden in 1942, and in 1941 by a team led by Wilfrid C Bailey, one of Emil Haury's graduate students. The deepest artifacts from Ventana Cave were recovered from a layer of volcanic debris that also contained Pleistocene horse, Burden's pronghorn, tapir, sloth, and other extinct and modern species. A projectile point from the volcanic debris layer was compared to the Folsom Tradition and later to the Clovis culture, but the assemblage was peculiar enough to warrant a separate name – the Ventana Complex. Radiocarbon dates from the volcanic debris layer indicated an age of about 11,300 BP.

Bruce Huckell and C. Vance Haynes restudied the Ventana Cave stratigraphy and artifact assemblage in 1992-1994. New radiocarbon dates and reanalysis of the artifacts indicates that the volcanic debris layer was laid down between 10,500-8,800 BP. Huckel and Haynes hypothesized that vertical turbation (postdepositional disturbance) is responsible for Haury's original interpretation that these extinct fauna were killed with stone tools. "This turbation may have led to the incorporation of bones of extinct fauna from an underlying conglomerate deposit rich in horse remains, creating the impression of their association with artifacts". Huckel and Haynes believe the Ventana Complex is post-Clovis, and not closely related.

Ventana Cave was declared a National Historic Landmark in 1964.
