= Byron Cummings =

American college administrator (1860–1954)

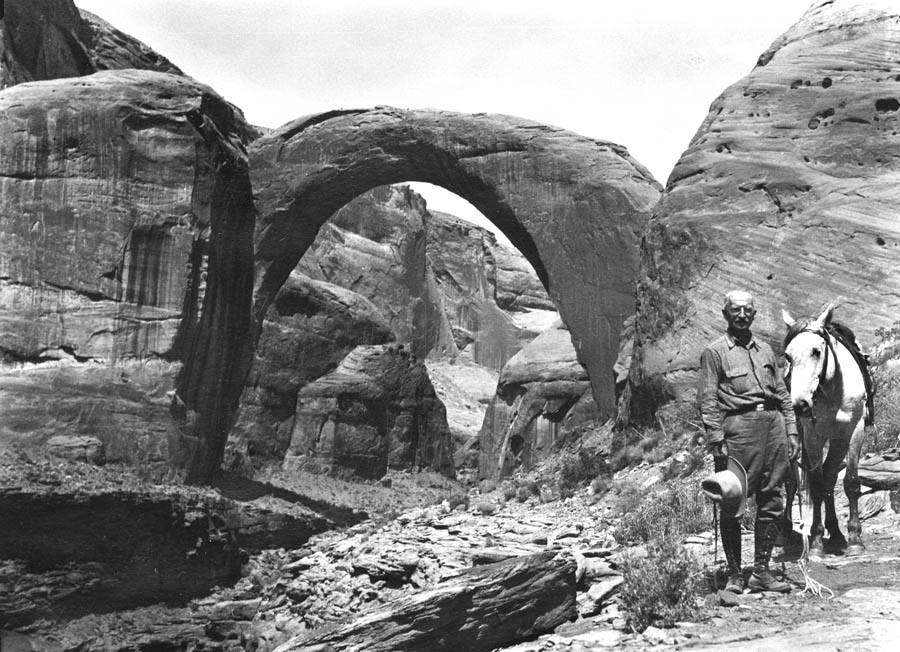
- Byron Cummings at Rainbow Bridge, 1909

Biographical details
- Born: September 20, 1860; Westville, New York, U.S.
- Died: May 21, 1954 (aged 93); Tucson, Arizona, U.S.
- Education: Oswego Normal (1885); Rutgers (1889)

Coaching career (HC unless noted)
- 1897: Utah

Head coaching record
- Overall: 1–5

Byron Cummings at Arizona State Museum, circa 1940s. Dean Cummings is holding a large pot from Kinishba Ruins, which he excavated.

Byron G. Cummings (September 20, 1860 – May 21, 1954) was an American archaeologist and university president. He is known as the dean of Southwestern archaeology. Cummings was the founding head of University of Arizona's Department of Archaeology (1915–1937), the school's ninth president (1927–1928), the Arizona State Museum's first director (1915–1938), and the founder of the Arizona Archaeological and Historical Society, which was established in 1916.

Cummings was also a college football coach and professor at the University of Utah. He served as the head football coach at the University of Utah 1897 where he was also a professor from 1893 to 1915. He later served as a professor at the University of Arizona. Exploration he and his students conducted in SE Utah and NE Arizona, then almost unknown to Americans, resulted in the discoveries of the Natural Bridges that President Roosevelt declared as Natural Bridges National Monument in 1908. Cummings continued his explorations into Arizona, where he discovered Betatakin, Inscription House, and other famed cliff dwellings south and east of Navajo Mountain. On August 14, 1909, he led his party to the discovery of Rainbow Natural Bridge. From the University of Arizona continued his archeological researches each summer until he retired from the classroom and the Arizona State Museum in 1938, with the title of Director Emeritus. His last field work was at Kinishba, a great ruin on the Apache reservation, excavation of which he pursued annually from 1931 through 1939 with student assistants majoring in anthropology. He restored part of the ruin and built a local museum with the help of Apache labor, and he cared for it until 1946 when he retired asecond time in order to devote full time to his writings. Even at 70 few student helpers could wield a shovel as long and as efficiently as he, and none could equal him on a cross-country hike.

Cummings was a believer in 'mythical giants' which were commonly reported from archaeological sites in the early 1900s in North America. Despite numerous reports of giant skeletons being found, no documented evidence of their existence has been produced. In 1930, Cummings, then Dean of the University of Arizona Archaeological Department, led an expedition "160 miles south of the [Mexican] border" where Cummings expected to find giant skeletons after having apparently previously found one male and two female skeletons each over 8 feet tall with heads over 1 foot long in a "burial ground to the 'cyclops'".

== Southwestern archaeology ==
Professor Cummings did pioneering archaeological fieldwork in the early 1900s in southern Utah's San Juan country. Archaeologist Neil Judd, then Cummings' student, assisted in this work, as did other of Cummings' field students.

Cummings was the first to discover Pleistocene man in southern Arizona and his discoveries led to the eventual recognition of the Cochise culture that has been dated to before 6,000 B.C. He authored numerous articles, pamphlets and books about Southwestern cultures based on the sites and ruins he explored. One of his dreams was realized when in 1936 the doors of a new Arizona State Museum building were opened to the public. He retired from the department of archaeology in 1937 and from the museum in 1938, but remained Director Emeritus until his death in Tucson in 1954 at the age of 93.

== Discovery of Rainbow Bridge, 1909 ==
Cummings was co-head of the US party attempting to be the first Americans to visit this landmark, along with William B. Douglass, Examiner of Surveys for the United States General Land Office. John Wetherill organized the Cummings expedition. There had been apparent friction between Cummings and Douglass over who would be the first to visit Rainbow Bridge. On August 14, 1909, the party reached the Bridge. Cummings and Douglass both spurred their horses in an attempt to be the first Americans to ride under the bridge. Wetherill saw what was happening and, being closer to the bridge, went on ahead and rode first under the span.

== Head coaching record ==
Year	Team	Overall	Conference	Standing	Bowl/playoffs
Utah Utes (Independent) (1897)
1897	Utah	1–5			
Utah:		1–5			
Total:		1–5			
