= John Otis Brew =

American archaeologist (1906–1988)

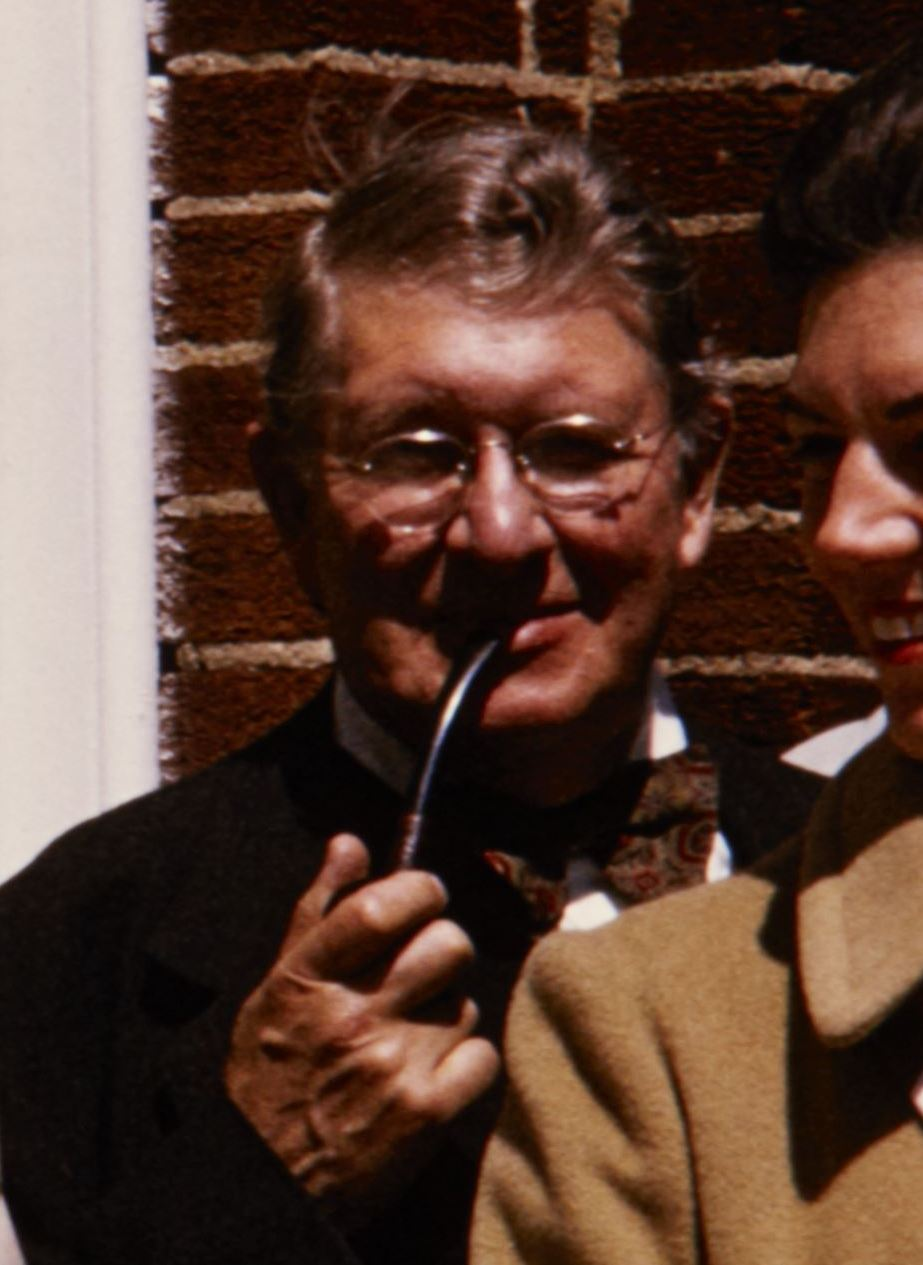

John Otis Brew (March 28, 1906 – March 19, 1988), was an American archaeologist of the American Southwest and director at the Peabody Museum at Harvard University. Many of his publications are still used today by archaeologists that conduct their work in the American Southwest. J.O. Brew was a titan in the world of archaeology for his attempts to "preserve our archaeological heritage".

== Early life and academic career ==
From his early beginnings, Brew had an interest in history, but his true love was classical archaeology. Brew received his education at Dartmouth College where he earned a bachelor's degree in fine arts in 1928. He then went on to Harvard University for his graduate studies where he earned a Thaw Fellowship. In 1931 "Jo", as he was known by his friends and colleagues, finished his residence requirements at Harvard and gained an invitation to join the Peabody Museum's Claflin-Emerson Expedition for archaeological reconnaissance which was located in northeastern Utah.

== Research ==
=== Alkali Ridge Expedition ===
In 1931, Brew was made director of the Peabody Museum's Southeastern Utah Expedition to Alkali Ridge. His work in this location is what he is most known for. His report, The Archaeology of Alkali Ridge, Southeastern Utah, With a Review of the Prehistory of the Mesa Verde Division of the San Juan and Some Observations on Archaeological Systematics, was published in 1946 and "immediately became a landmark in southwestern archaeological literature". In this particular report Brew recorded such outstanding detail and interpretations of the site that the first three chapters are still used as a fundamental reference today.

=== Harvard Irish Expedition ===
Brew was introduced to Old World archaeology by Hugh Hencken and Hallam Movius in 1934. He accompanied them on the Harvard Irish Mission in which they excavated a hill fort in County Clare and a lake dwelling in County Meath.

=== Awatovi Expedition ===
From the years 1936–1939 Brew directed the Peabody Museum's Awatovi Expedition in northeastern Arizona. This expedition was considered to be Brew's second major archeological undertaking. During this expedition Brew and his team investigated the Jeddito region on the Hopi Indian Reservation, where, among other things, they discovered a major Franciscan Mission built in the seventeenth century. Because of World War II most of the reports for the Awatovi Expedition were not published until later, but by 1978 eleven reports started to appear. A "final" report for the Awatovi Expedition has never been written.

=== Upper Gila Expedition ===
Brew's third major research program came between 1949 and 1954 with the Peabody Museum's Upper Gila Expedition. There he investigated Anasazi-Mogollon contact with the help of colleagues, including Watson Smith and Charles R. McGimsey III, from his work at the Awatovi Expedition. Some women (such as Hester A. Davis) assisted with this expedition, which was unusual at the time. This expedition was originally planned to be carried out in the 1930s with the help of Donald Scott, who was the director of the Peabody Museum at the time. Those who have had the pleasure of working with Brew on archaeological sites have said, "He was remarkably skilled at keeping track of the daily minutiae of field research without losing sight of the major goals of the work".

== Archaeological Involvement and the Peabody Museum ==
Brew was appointed curator of southwestern archaeology at the Peabody Museum in 1941 and the curator of North American archaeology in 1945. Brew also taught, which he thoroughly enjoyed, and made sure his students were actively enjoying the classroom as much as he was. These positions left Brew ample time to pursue his love for archaeological research and never interfered with his work. In 1948 he was appointed director of the Peabody Museum.

In 1945 the Committee for the Recovery of Archaeological Remains, known as CRAR, was formed. The committee was appointed by the Society for American Archaeology, the American Anthropological Association and the American Council of Learned Societies and consisted of William S. Webb, A.V. Kidder, Frederick Johnson, and John Otis Brew (as the chairman). CRAR was a successful and very productive organization with J.O. Brew at the head. Brew was applauded for his leadership by Emil Haury in the following quote, "Jo knows his way around Washington, on the Hill and wherever else it counts. His dealings with tough-minded Senators, Representatives, and people in the Bureau of the Budget, have been done with a finesse that has paid off. All one needs to do is…catch the enthusiasm Jo has instilled in them (Federal agency representatives) for an activity that is far from their main line of interest".

J.O. Brew was also president of the Society for American Archaeology. In 1949 he revealed a humorous side when he wrote to his colleagues stating, "I have been instructed by the last Annual Meeting of the Society for American Archaeology to appoint a committee to determine whether or not we should retain the traditional spelling 'Archaeology' or adopt the bob-tailed version 'Archeology' in the official name of the society and all its works". The archaeologists considered Brew's letter with all seriousness, and voted sixteen to seven in favor of the traditional spelling.

The Peabody Museum celebrated its one-hundredth anniversary on October 8, 1966. The event was celebrated the evening before with approximately four-hundred and fifty graduates, friends, faculty, and staff. IN an essay in the volume 100 Years of Archaeology, Brew notes that it was a festive event in which tobacco was smoked and cocktails were served for the first time inside the halls of the museum. He also organized several lectures that took place over the 1966 academic year that discussed the growth of the five major phases of anthropology from 1866 to 1966. Those phases were: American archaeology, Old world prehistory, Biological anthropology, Ethnology and social anthropology, and Anthropological linguistics. The lecturers were Gordon Willey of Harvard University, Glyn Daniel of Cambridge University in England, Sherwood Washburn of the University of California at Berkeley, Fred Eggan of the University of Chicago, and Floyd Lounsbury of Yale University. Brew also gave a brief history of the Peabody Museum. All of these activities showed what great enthusiasm Brew had for Harvard University, the Peabody Museum, and the fields of anthropology and archaeology.

Brew also became actively involved with the National Park Service Advisory Board and UNESCO's International Committee for Monuments, Historic Sites, and Archaeological Excavations, for which he was chairman for a number of years. He was a member of the Massachusetts Historical Commission and the advisory board of Plimoth Plantation and served as trustee of Fruitlands Museum in Harvard, Massachusetts. Late in his life he also served on a board that advised the Tennessee Valley Authority on archaeological matters.

== Personal life ==
John Otis Brew married Evelyn Nimmo in 1939 at the Awatovi Expedition site and they had two children, Alan P. Brew and Lindsay E. Brew. Alan followed in his father's footsteps and became an archaeologist while Lindsay became a lawyer. Brew also enjoyed collecting trolley car memorabilia, which is now permanently housed in the Boston Public Library. He will always be remembered as an intelligent, humorous, and sensitive person who helped to save archaeological sites from being destroyed.

== Selected works ==
Brew, John O.

- (1941) Bibliography: Field Methods in Archaeology, Anthropology 15. Ms. on file, Department of Anthropology, Harvard University, Cambridge.
- (1943) Applied Anthropology in the Southwest. Applied Anthropology 3:35–40.
- (1946) The Archaeology of Alkali Ridge, Southeastern Utah, With a Review of the Prehistory of the Mesa Verde Division of the San Juan and Some Observations on Archaeological Systematics. Papers of the Peabody Museum of American Archaeology and Ethnology Vol. 21. Harvard University, Cambridge.
- (1948) The 1947 Reconnaissance and the Proposed Upper Gila Expedition of the Peabody Museum of Harvard University (with E. B. Danson). El Palacio 55:211–222.
- (1956) The Metal Ages: Copper, Bronze, and Iron. In Man, Culture, and Society, edited by H. L. Shapiro, pp. 111–138. Oxford University Press, New York.
- (1966) Salvage Archaeology: Saving the Past from the Present. The Nation 203:117–120.
- (1968) Introduction. In One Hundred Years of Anthropology, edited by J. O. Brew, pp. 5–25. Harvard University Press, Cambridge.
- (1979) Hopi Prehistory and History to 1850. In Southwest, edited by A. Ortiz, pp. 514–523. Handbook of North American Indians, vol. 9, W. G. Sturtevant, general editor. Smithsonian Institution, Washington, D.C.
