= Grand Canyon Power House =

- U.S. National Register of Historic Places
- U.S. National Historic Landmark
- U.S. National Historic Landmark District – Contributing property
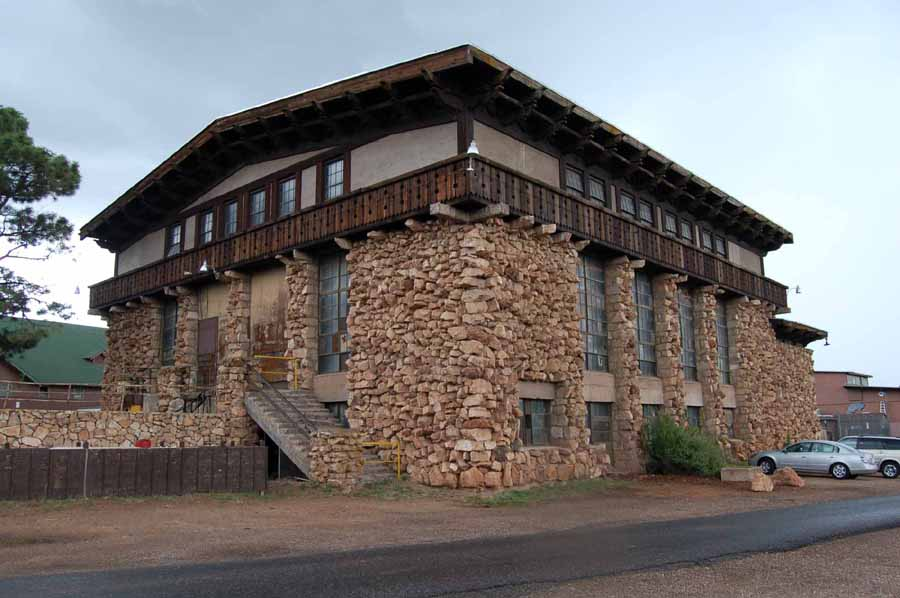

- Location within Arizona Location within the United States
- Location: Grand Canyon National Park, Arizona
- Coordinates: 36°3′20.8″N 112°8′26.3″W
- Built: 1926
- Architect: Atchison, Topeka & Santa Fe RR
- Part of: Grand Canyon Village Historic District (ID75000343)
- NRHP reference No.: 87001411

Significant dates
- Added to NRHP: May 28, 1987
- Designated NHL: May 28, 1987
- Designated NHLDCP: February 18, 1987

Grand Canyon Power House is a former electric power plant that served National Park Service and concessioner facilities at the South Rim of the Grand Canyon in Grand Canyon National Park. It is significant for its architecture, which masks the building's industrial function behind a veneer of rustic design. It has been designated a National Historic Landmark on the basis of its design quality and the level of preservation of its equipment.

== History ==
The Grand Canyon Power House was built in 1926 by the Atchison, Topeka & Santa Fe Railway to provide electrical power to its facilities at the South Rim, which included a train station, the El Tovar Hotel and the Bright Angel Lodge. It also provided steam to heat train cars parked at the Grand Canyon rail yard. The building's architect is unknown, but is believed to have been a Los Angeles-based architect known both to the railroad and to Daniel Ray Hull, the director of the National Park Service Landscape Engineering division, probably a staff architect for the Santa Fe. Hull at the time shared an office in Los Angeles with Gilbert Stanley Underwood, who worked for the competing Union Pacific Railway's Utah Parks Company, designing structures at the North Rim and in national parks in Utah. The drawings were completed in 1925, but none are signed by an identifiable individual or firm. The 1926 Power House replaced an earlier structure that housed boilers and pumps. It was operated by the railroad until 1954, when it was sold to the National Park Service, who hired the Fred Harvey Company, the chief park concessioner, to operate the plant. It ceased operations in 1956 and its smokestack was demolished immediately after. The plant's diesel generators, pumps, boilers and electrical equipment remain intact. The building is used for storage by Fred Harvey.

== Description ==
The Grand Canyon Power Plant is a concrete framed industrial building sheathed in a rustic exterior reminiscent of a huge Swiss chalet. Despite its bulk, the design of the plant carefully minimizes its apparent bulk and integrates it with the natural landscape. The design borrows elements from the similarly Swiss-rustic El Tovar Hotel located nearby. The building's details are scaled to produce a trompe-l'œil effect, with elements such as the balcony rail, eaves and windows about twice as big as would normally be expected.

The building is built into a slope, further reducing its scale. Its main mass is a tall main floor set over a low raised basement, all enclosed in random rubble limestone in a rough texture with deeply raked joints. Above this masonry mass is an upper story of painted concrete, set off by the false balcony with its high railing on three sides and part of the fourth. The upper story's steel industrial sash windows are framed with wood trim. The gable roof has a shallow slope with broad and heavy eaves. A west extension is detailed in a similar manner, and was apparently built just after the main building to accommodate a refrigeration plant. It retains some of its cork insulation on the inside. The interior is divided down the middle, following the roof ridgeline with an industrial steel and glass curtain wall. The roof is supported by steel trusses supporting wood decking. The original Fairbanks-Morse diesel generators are still in place, surrounded by access catwalks. A bridge crane used to service the generators remains intact.

The interior has been infilled with a freestanding multilevel structure to accommodate storage and office functions. The new structure is independent of the building's historical fabric and can be removed without harm to the original structure.

== Historical designations ==
The Grand Canyon Power Plant was declared a National Historic Landmark on May 28, 1987. It is also included in the Grand Canyon Village National Historic Landmark District.
