= William D. Lipe =

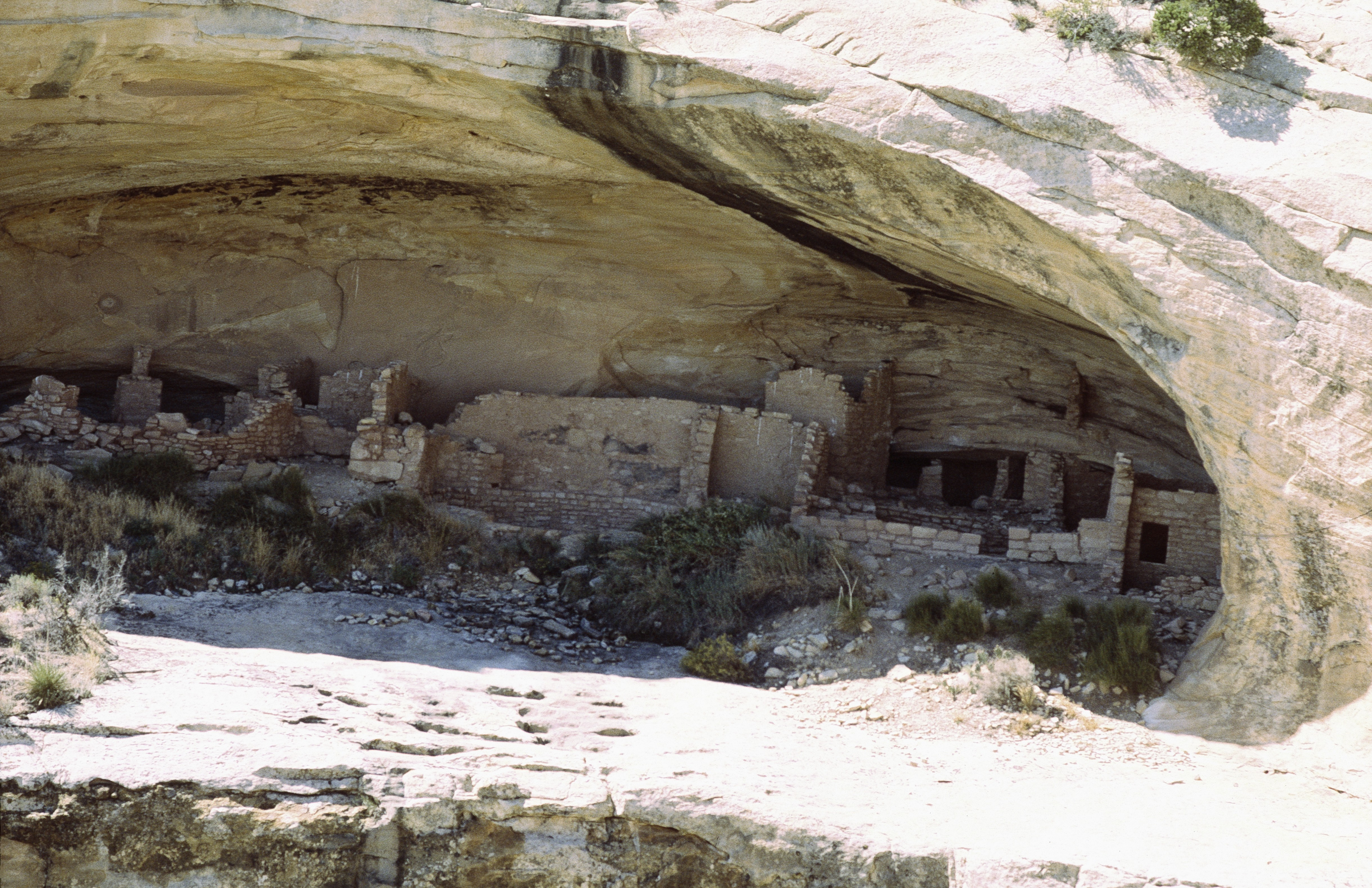
Butler Wash cliff dwellings in Southeastern Utah.

William D. Lipe (born 5 May 1935), also known as Bill Lipe, is an archaeologist known for his work in the American Southwest and his Conservation Model. Lipe has contributed to Cultural Resource Management (CRM) and public archaeology. In addition to this, he has done work with the Glen Canyon Project, the Dolores Archaeological Program, and the Crow Canyon Archaeological Center.

== Biography ==
Bill Lipe was born to Raymond and Louise Lipe on 5 May 1935 in Struggleville, Oklahoma. His family moved to Bristow, Oklahoma in 1941, where Lipe later graduating high school. In 1953, he started college at the University of Tulsa, wanting to study journalism. However, he later discovered a passion for anthropology and decided to change his field of study. The University of Tulsa did not have an anthropology department, so he transferred to the University of Oklahoma. In 1957, Lipe graduated with a bachelor's degree in anthropology. The same year, he began graduate school at Yale University, and graduated in 1966 after punctuated years of archaeological work. On 17 February 1962, Lipe married June Finley, and the two went on to have three children, Carrie, Jessica, and David. On 19 June 2005, June Lipe passed away.

== Research and career ==
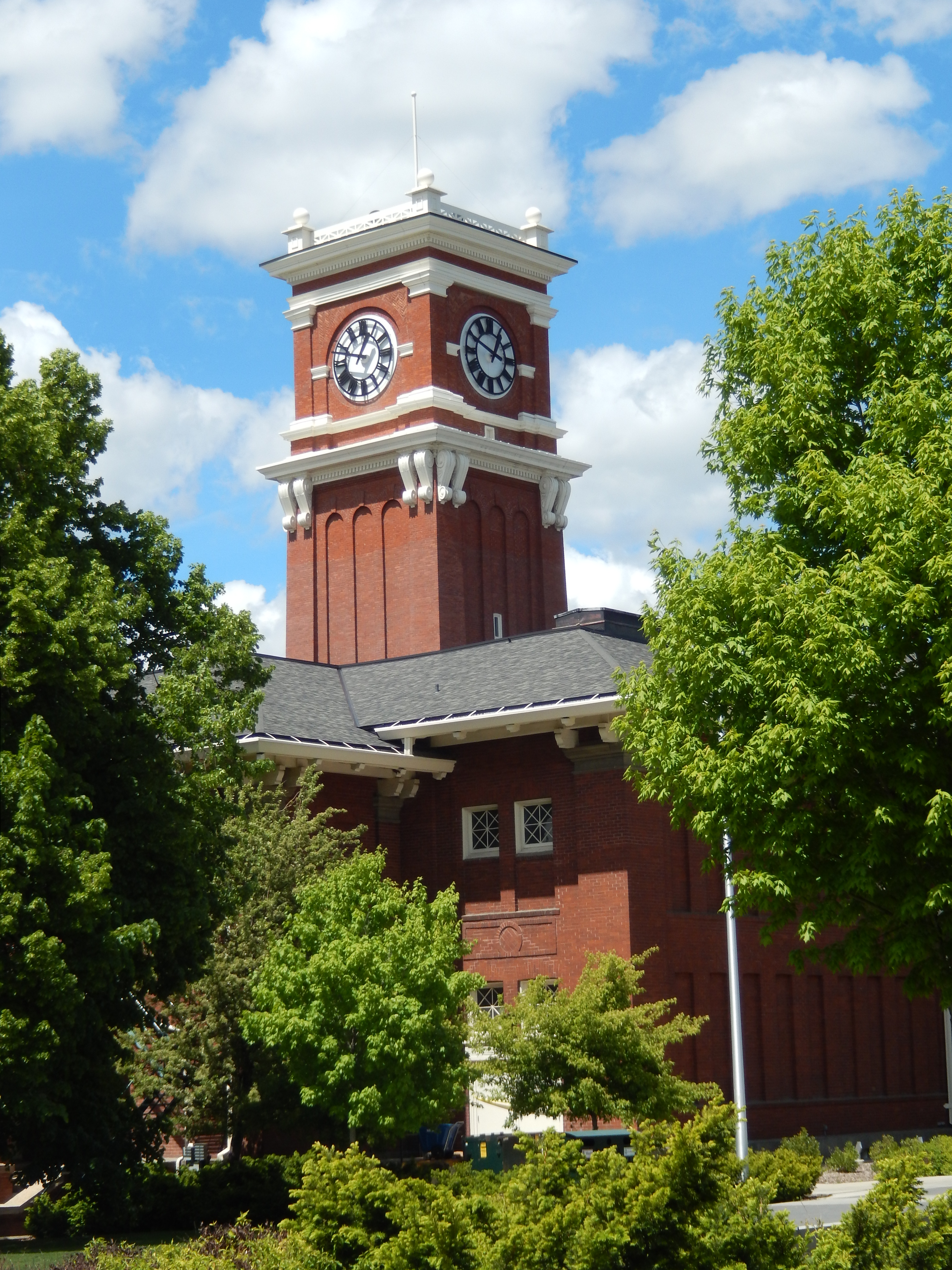
Washington State University campus.

In 1958, Bill Lipe was hired as a crew chief for the University of Utah section of the Glen Canyon Archaeological Project where he remained for three years. During this time, he published reports in the anthropology papers in the University of Utah Anthropological Papers. In 1964, Lipe got a tenure track job at the State University of New York at Binghamton (later renamed Binghamton University) and later began work in the Cedar Mesa region of Southeast Utah. In 1972, he accepted the assistant director of Research position at the Museum of Northern Arizona in Flagstaff and worked there until 1976. That same year, Lipe was hired by Washington State University in Pullman and has worked there ever since.

Lipe worked on the Dolores Archaeological Program in southwest Colorado from 1978 to 1985, and since 1984, he has worked as a research associate at the Crow Canyon Archaeological Center in southeastern Utah. In 1995, Lipe became the president of the Society for American Archeology.

Lipe retired in May 2006. He is currently Professor Emeritus of Anthropology at Washington State University.

== Archaeological and cultural resource management contributions ==
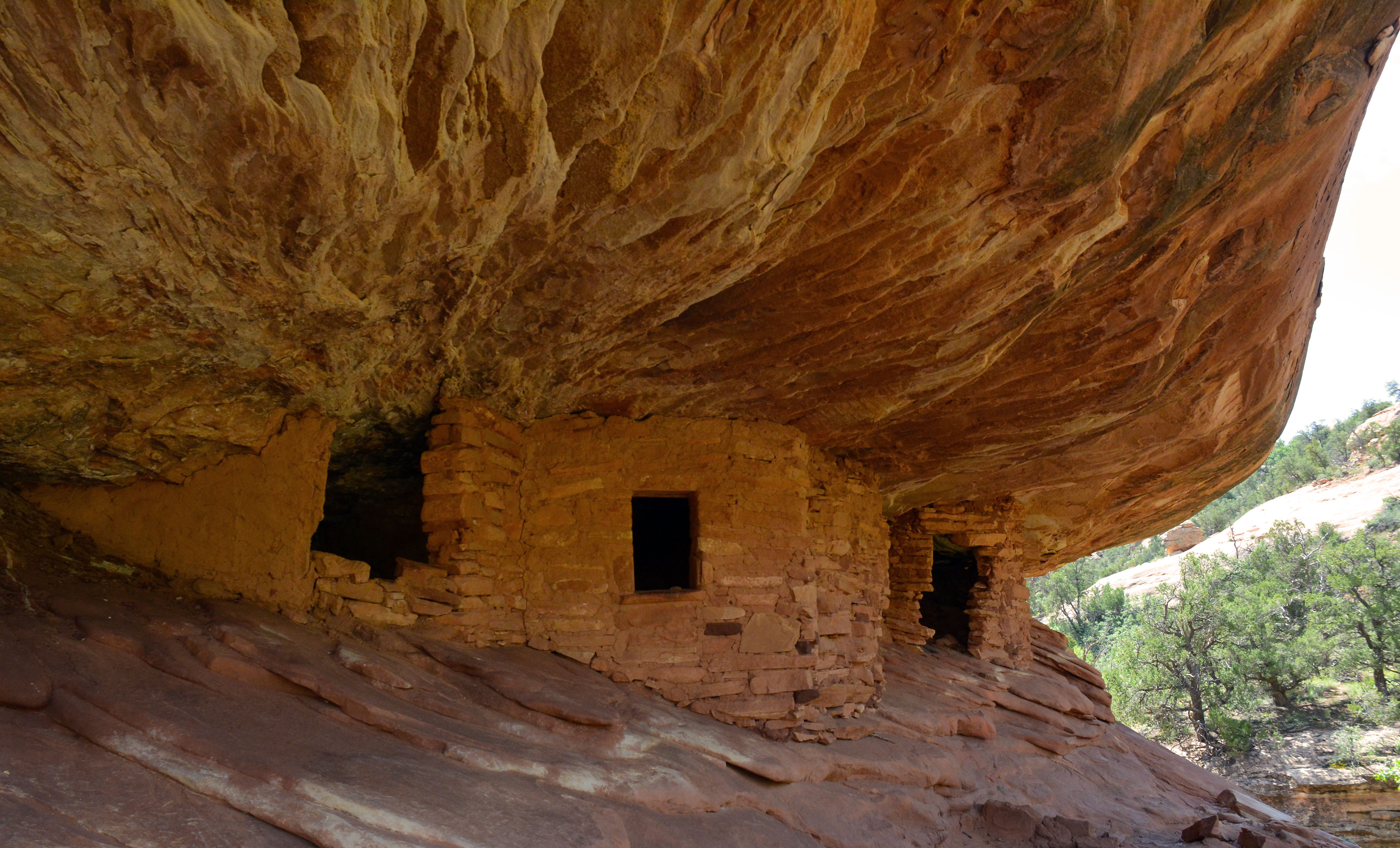
Cedar Mesa site.

=== Cedar Mesa ===
From 1971 to 1976, Bill Lipe worked in the Cedar Mesa area with R.G. Matson. The two investigated Basketmaker II site locations and occupation patterns. In 1972, they began and directed the Cedar Mesa Project. Lipe and Matson added to the knowledge of Basketmaker II. They made the "first complete settlement pattern analyses", "the first dating of the mesa-top Grand Gulch Phase", "the first description of western Basketmaker II habitation structures," "the first reliable population figures", and "the first understanding of diet, including the recognition of Basketmaker II dependence on maize".

=== Conservation Model ===
In 1974, Lipe's article, “A Conservation Model for American Archaeology” was published. In the article, he discusses the solution to the destruction of archaeological sites: promoting conservation with public education, more archaeological and environmental preserves, and archaeological involvement in the planning of development projects. In the 1970s and 80s, Lipe's Conservation Model became part of Cultural Resource Management (CRM).

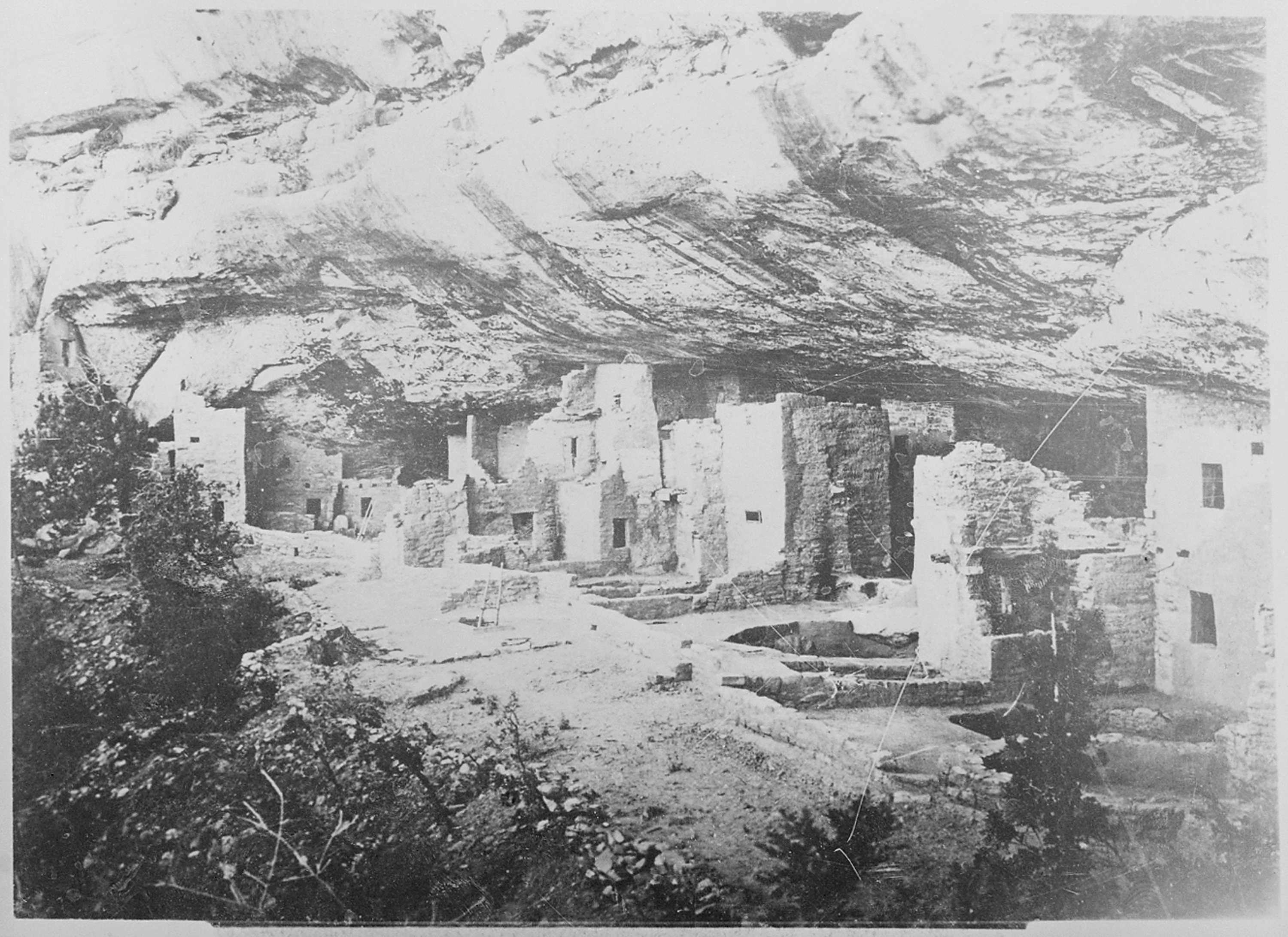
Mesa Verde in Southwestern Colorado

==== Airlie House Seminars ====
William Lipe attended and was a key contributor to the 1974 Airlie House retreat seminars. The seminars, held in Warrenton, Virginia over six one-week sessions, are collectively regarded as being a watershed event in the development of Cultural Resource Management (CRM) in the United States. The Society for American Archaeology (SAA) organized the seminars, which were funded by the National Park Service. As noted by Lynn Sebastian, 1977 publication by Hester Davis and Charles McGimsey co-authored a report on the results of the seminars, which, as noted by Lynn Sebastian "established a vision and direction that guided the practice of archaeology within the field of CRM for many years." As of 2023, the Society for American Archaeology is planning another "Airlie House-like seminar", which prompted published reflections by William Lipe and Alice Kehoe about their experiences at Airlie House.

=== Dolores Archaeological Program ===
From 1978 to 1985, Lipe worked on the Dolores Archaeological Program. During this time, he oversaw excavations in the Grass Mesa region. Lipe helped enhance the program's design and databases.

=== Crow Canyon ===
Since 1984, Lipe has worked with the Crow Canyon Archaeological Center. His work involved the population relocation of the 1200s C.E., for which he proposed a snowball effect model. In addition, Lipe wrote a chapter in the first published monograph by the Crow Canyon Archaeological Center. The chapter was about a theory on the social scale of Anasazi kivas (now known as ancestral Pueblo sites), which found a middle ground between two contrasting theories.

=== President of the Society for American Archeology ===
In 1995, Lipe became the president of the Society for American Archeology. During his two years as president, Lipe focused on increasing the attention and acknowledgement of CRM and the need for public education of archaeology. He created offices and committees for such purposes.

== Awards and recognitions ==
- 2021 - Honorary Doctoral Award by Washington State University.
- 2010 – A.V. Kidder Award by the American Anthropological Association.
- 2006 – McGimsey-Davis Distinguished Service Award by the Register of Professional Archaeologists.
- 2006 – Conservation & Heritage Management Award by the Archaeological Institute of America.
- 2002 – Byron S. Cummings Award by the Arizona Archaeological and Historical Society.
- 2000 – SAA Distinguished Service Award by the Society for American Archeology.
- 1998 – Seiberling Award for Leadership in Conserving America's Cultural Resources by the Society of Professional Archaeology.
- 1995-1997 – President of the Society for American Archeology.

== Select publications ==
- William D. Lipe, et al. (2016). "Cultural and Genetic Contexts for Early Turkey Domestication in the Northern Southwest". American Antiquity 81, no. 1: 97–113.
- William D. Lipe (1995). “Depopulation of the Northern San Juan: Conditions in the Turbulent 1200s”. Journal of Anthropological Archaeology 14, no. 2 (1995): 143–169. doi:10.1006/jaar.1995.1008
- William R. Haase IV, William D. Lipe, and R. G. Matson. (1988) "Adaptational Continuities and Occupational Discontinuities: The Cedar Mesa Anasazi." Journal of Field Archaeology 15, no. 3 (1988): 245–64. doi:10.2307/530307
- William D. Lipe (1984). "Value and Meaning in Cultural Resources". In Approaches to the Archaeological Heritage, edited by Henry Cleere, 1–11. Cambridge, England: Cambridge University Press, 1984.
- William D. Lipe (1974). “A Conservation Model for American Archaeology”. KIVA 39, no. 3-4 (1974): 213–245. doi:10.1080/00231940.1974.11757792
