= Watson Smith =

American archaeologist

Samuel Watson Smith (August 21, 1897, Cincinnati, Ohio – July 29, 1993, Tucson, Arizona) was an American archaeologist and researcher on the indigenous cultures and artifacts of the western Anasazi area.

== Life and career ==
Watson Smith matriculated in 1915 at Brown University and graduated there in 1919 with a bachelor's degree after a brief interruption for military service in WW I. After working for some time, he entered Harvard Law School and graduated there in 1924. He then worked for a law firm in Providence, Rhode Island until 1930, when his parents died. From 1930 to 1933 he worked on settling his parents' estates and by inheritance became independently wealthy. In the summer of 1933 he did archaeological field work at Colorado's Lowry Pueblo with Paul Sidney Martin of the Field Museum of Natural History. After studying law, anthropology, and history during the winter of 1934–1935 under the direction of Max Radin at the University of California, Berkeley, Smith became committed to a career in archaeology. In the spring of 1935 he joined Ansel Hall's Rainbow Bridge-Monument Valley Expedition in the Kayenta area and also spent the early summers of 1936 and 1937 as a member of the Expedition. During this time, Smith met George Walter Brainerd, Edward Twitchell Hall, and John Beach Rinaldo. In the autumn of 1935, Lyndon Lane Hargrave invited Smith to work at the Museum of Northern Arizona with him and Harold Sellers Colton in the preparation of the Handbook of Northern Arizona Pottery Types, which was published in 1937.

In the summer of 1936, Smith joined the Awatovi Expedition, led by John Otis Brew. Smith's arrival happened to coincide with the discovery of a kiva with extensive painted murals. He was assigned the task of exposing these "remarkable artistic and religious records." This work eventually led to his becoming a leading expert on "ceramic classification, murals, Pueblo ethnology and Zuni law."

World War II interrupted Smith's career with military service in the Southwest Pacific. On duty in New Zealand he met the botanist Lucy Cranwell, and in 1943 they were married. After the war they settled in Cambridge where their son, Benjamin, was born and where Smith continued work on his report on the kiva murals. ... In 1948 the Smiths moved to Tucson, Arizona, where Watson decided to continue research and writing on the Awatovi materials, much of which still remained unstudied and unreported.

In 1949 and 1951 he directed the Peabody Museum's excavations in New Mexico's Quemado area, which is on the boundary of two cultures: Anasazi and Mogollon. In 1951 he, with John Milton Roberts, began a study of Zuni law. Zuni elders and an interpreter enabled Smith and Roberts to compile a unique corpus of Zuni law, which they published in 1954. During his long career, he published many scholarly articles, essays, reviews, and forewords. In 1992 he published a 93-page article on his archaeological career.

For many years Smith was a member of the Board of Directors of the Museum of Northern Arizona; he eventually wrote its history, published in 1969. In 1983 the American Anthropological Association awarded him the Alfred Vincent Kidder medal for eminence in American archaeology.

The range and vitality of Watson Smith’s interests are extended in his publications for the Awatovi project which cover such diverse topics as the Franciscan Church, the murals and ceramics. The mural research was both a masterpiece of field technique and an indication of his contributions to Southwestern art and ceremonialism. Watson Smith is perhaps best known for his contributions in ceramics.

== Selected publications ==
- Kiva mural decorations at Awatovi and Kawaika-a : with a survey of other wall paintings in the Pueblo Southwest. 1951.
  - Kiva Mural Decorations at Awatovi and Kawaika-a: With a Survey of Other Wall Paintings in the Pueblo Southwest. 15 April 2006. ISBN 9780873651264.
- Excavations in Big Hawk Valley, Wupatki National Monument, Arizona. 1952.
- with John Milton Roberts: Zuni law: a field of values. 1954.
- with Richard B. Woodbury and Nathalie F. S. Woodbury: The excavation of Hawikuh by Frederick Webb Hodge: report of the Hendricks-Hodge Expedition, 1917-1923. 1966.
- Painted ceramics of the western mound at Awatovi. 1971.
- Prehistoric kivas of Antelope Mesa: northeastern Arizona. 1972.
- The Williams site : a frontier Mogollon village in west-central New Mexico. 1973.
