= Arizona State Museum =

Museum in Arizona, United States

Coordinates: 32°13′56″N 110°57′21″W

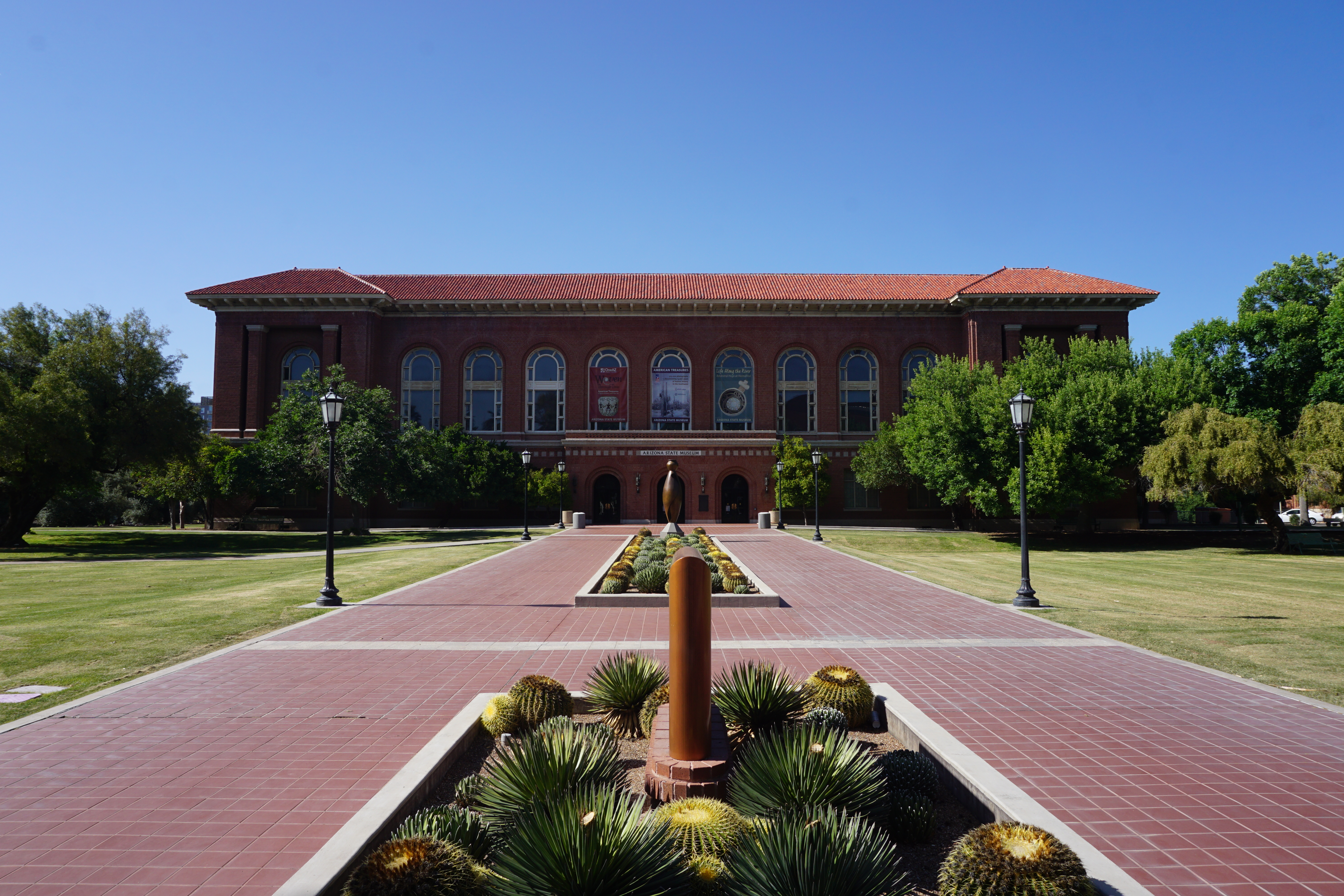
- Arizona State Museum North building
- Established: 1893
- Location: Tucson, Arizona
- Type: Archaeological, anthropological
- Owner: University of Arizona

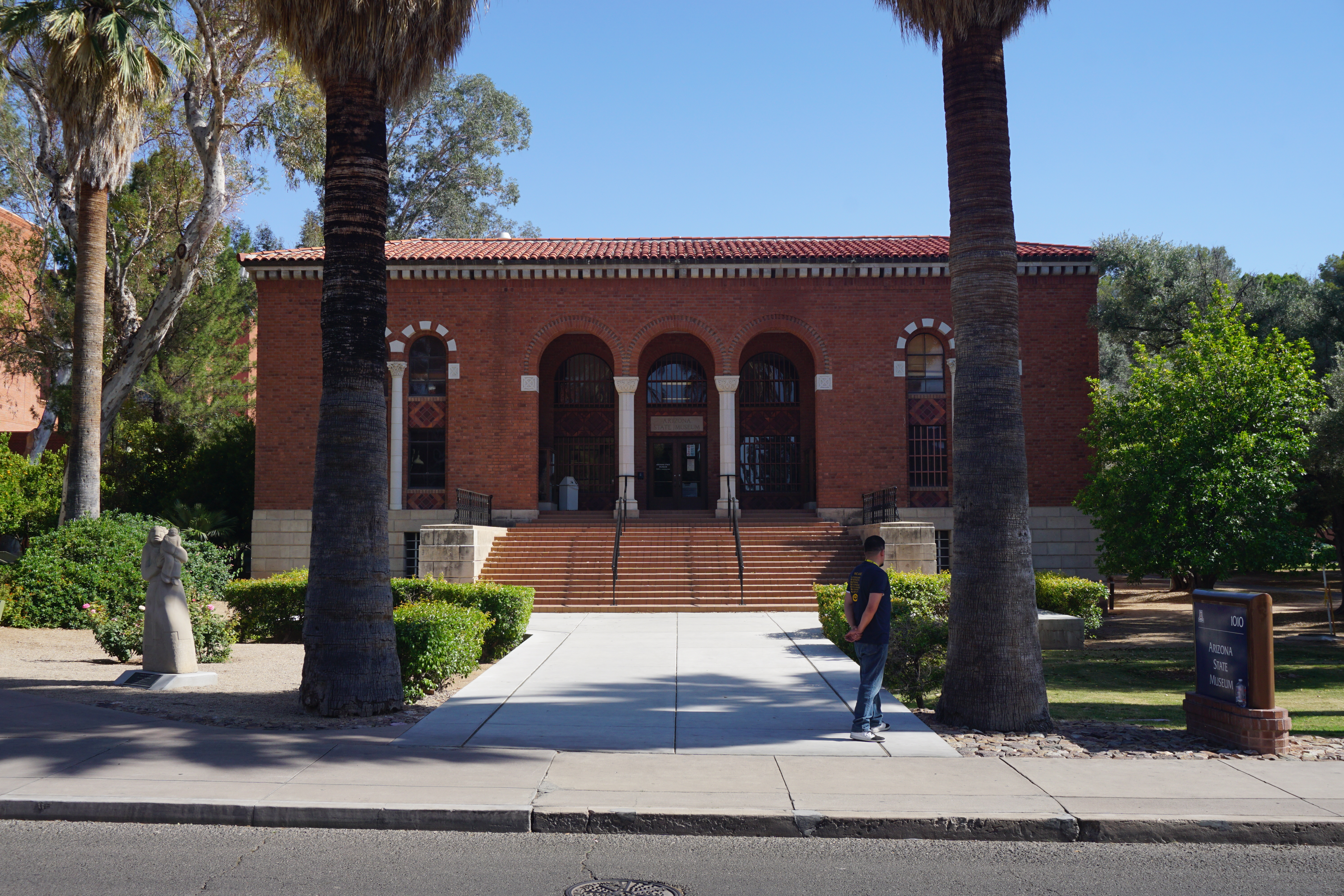
Arizona State Museum South building

The Arizona State Museum (ASM), founded in 1893, was originally a repository for the collection and protection of archaeological resources. Today, however, ASM stores artifacts, exhibits them and provides education and research opportunities. It was formed by authority of the Arizona Territorial Legislature. The museum is operated by the University of Arizona, and is located on the university campus in Tucson.

== History ==
Native peoples have existed in the North American continent for more than ten millennia. ASM investigates habitations, lifeways, art and communication in which these peoples in the Southwest engaged.

Museum staff investigate archaeological sites of past occupiers of North America to discover how people lived, what they ate, what they wore and how they created their art. These people lived day-to-day, created homesites and villages that, in many cases, have crumbled or been destroyed by natural forces.

An early and significant director of the museum, Emil W. Haury, conducted numerous archaeological excavations in the Southwest and taught students and others about his methods and discoveries.

The museum has been closed to the public since August 2024 due to "outdated and faulty electrical and plumbing systems, HVAC, fire alarms, smoke detectors, and sprinkler systems" in the Raymond H. Thompson Building which houses the museum.

== Collections ==
ASM holds artifacts created by cultures from the past as well as those presently active. The types of artifacts include pottery, jewelry, baskets, textiles and clothing. Archaeological objects were unearthed during excavations by museum staff and others. Ethnological items (those not acquired from excavation) have been donated by Native American tribes, acquired from individuals, as well as purchased by ASM.

Furthermore, the Arizona State Museum possesses a vast photographic collection, containing more than 350,000 prints, negatives, and transparencies illustrating the prehistory and ethnology of the American Southwest and northern Mexico (ASM Photographic Collection).. This number of photographic materials does not include the growing digital collection that the museum continues to develop. Noteworthy photographers in this collection includes Forman Hanna, Emil Haury, Helga Teiwes, and Greenville Goodwin.

== Exhibits ==
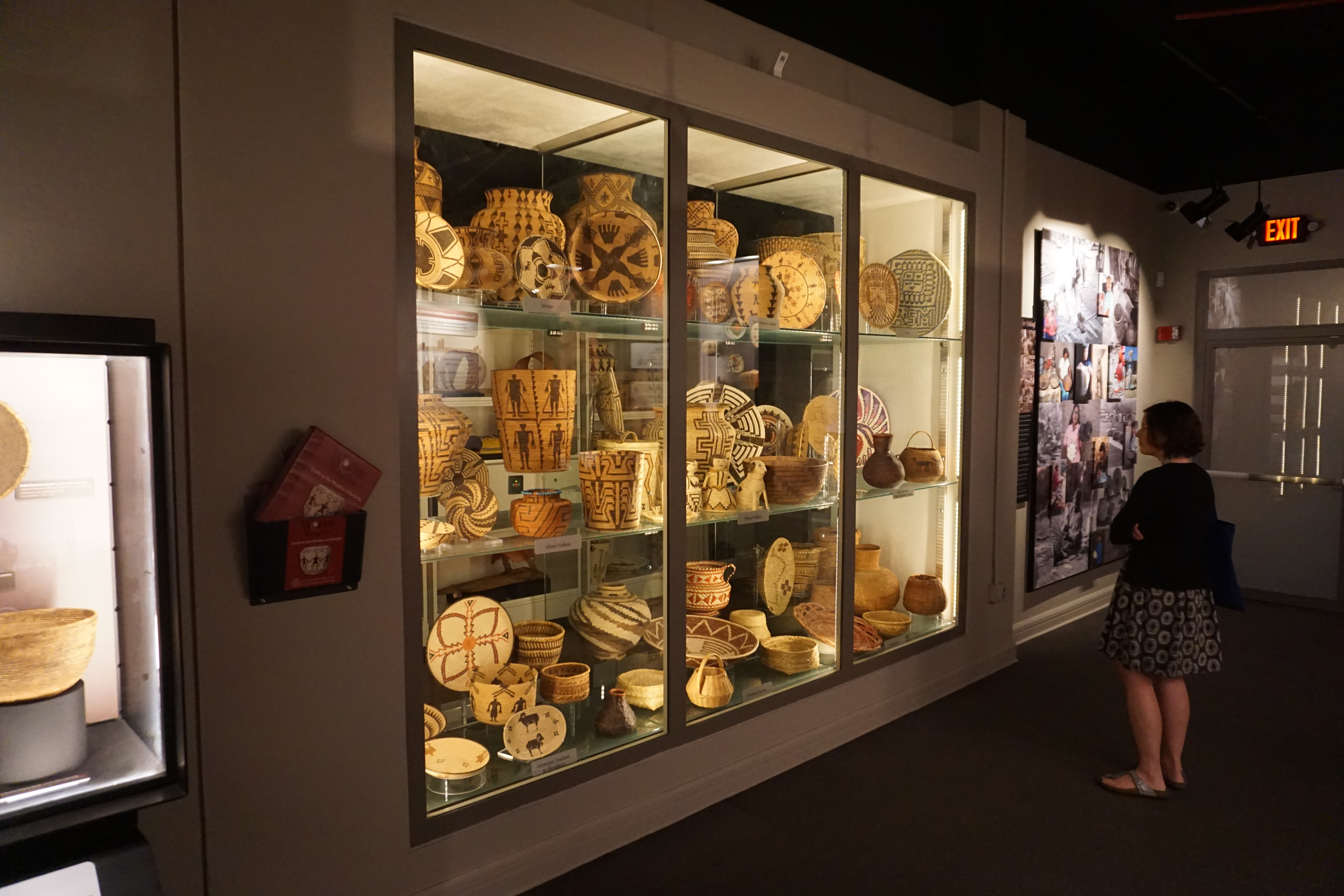
Woven Through Time: American Treasures of Native Basketry and Fiber Art exhibit at the Arizona State Museum

ASM continuously exhibits the objects it holds. A list of current and upcoming exhibits can be found here: https://statemuseum.arizona.edu/exhibits

== Programs ==
In addition to engaging university students through classroom, laboratory, and field instruction, ASM offers a full calendar of public programs celebrating the ancient indigenous and enduring Native cultures of the region, sharing its expertise and collections with visitors of all ages through exhibits, school programs, lectures, hands-on activities, workshops, and travel tours.

== Other activities ==
Students of archaeology, anthropology, art, design and other areas of investigation work with ASM personnel to become better acquainted with materials, techniques and objects from ASM’s collections. Some students participate in archaeological excavations conducted by the museum.

The Office of Ethnohistorical Research (OER) conducts research on the peoples of the southwestern United States and northern Mexico, offering access to Spanish and Mexican documents and scholarly publications. It also provides a number of resources for those wishing to conduct research on the area. The OER Library holds over 8,000 sources of information, including secondary works, reference materials, indexes to major archival collections, maps, ephemera, and guides to paleography and translation. Additionally, OER also maintains the Documentary Relations of the Southwest (DRSW), an online index of over 17,000 documents generated during the Spanish colonial period. The documents cover a broad range of civil, religious, military, and ecological issues that examine the relationships between Native Americans, Spanish colonists, Catholic missionaries, and the Spanish colonial administration.

AZSITE maintains and updates a geodatabase of cultural sites and surveys that may be accessed by those involved in related activities. This allows investigators to locate information without having to physically visit widely separated and, perhaps, little-known sites. There are hundreds of these sites in Arizona.

The Arizona State Museum’s library and archives is a research collection open to the public specializing in southwestern United States and northern Mexico archaeology, ethnology, ethnohistory, and material culture, as well as American Indian and museum studies. The library holds over 100,000 monographs and journals, many of which are rare titles, including original research data and manuscripts, archaeological reports on southwest-based field work, grey literature, and ephemera. The archive includes manuscripts, original research data, maps, correspondence, field notes, scrapbooks, diaries, drawings, oral histories, and sound recordings.

Each type of artifact held by ASM must be contained in an area that is protected from the damaging effects of humidity, heat and insects. ASM is home to the world’s largest collection of Southwest Indian pottery housed in a state-of-the-art vault so as to protect its 20,000 vessels from the damage suffered in the past.

Arizona State Museum administers the Arizona Antiquities Act and state laws concerning the discovery of human remains. In fulfillment of these responsibilities, ASM issues permits for archaeological work on state lands (lands owned or controlled by Arizona or any agent of Arizona), negotiates the disposition of archaeological human remains, maintains an archaeological site file, and provides repository services for the curation of archaeological collections , ,

The museum is an affiliate of the Smithsonian Institution.

== Relationships with Tribes ==
ASM has ongoing relations and communications with tribal members across the Southwest. This involves staff visits to tribal communities, visits to ASM by tribal members to evaluate objects, and cooperation with ASM staff during excavations. ASM also administers federal law dealing with return of human remains, sacred objects, funerary objects and objects of cultural patrimony.

== Administration ==
The museum has had seven directors since its founding:

- Byron Cummings (1915–1938)
- Emil W. Haury (1938–1964)
- Raymond H. Thompson (1964–1998)
- George J. Gumerman (1998–2002)
- Hartman H. Lomawaima (2002–2008)
- Beth Grindell (2008-2013)
- Patrick D. Lyons (2013- )
