= National Register of Historic Places listings in Apache County, Arizona =

Location of Apache County in Arizona

This is a list of the National Register of Historic Places listings in Apache County, Arizona. It is intended to be a complete list of the properties and districts on the National Register of Historic Places in Apache County, Arizona, United States. The locations of National Register properties and districts for which the latitude and longitude coordinates are included below, may be seen in a map.

There are 34 properties and districts listed on the National Register in the county, including 7 that are also National Historic Landmarks.

This National Park Service list is complete through NPS recent listings posted September 4, 2026.

== Listings county-wide ==
	Name on the Register	Image	Date listed	Location	City or town	Description
1	Allentown Bridge	Allentown Bridge	September 30, 1988 (#88001617)	Indian Route 9402 over the Puerco River at milepost 9.1; 35°16′51″N 109°09′16″W	Houck	
2	Alpine Elementary School	Alpine Elementary School	April 25, 1997 (#97000369)	11 and 12 County Road 2052, near its junction with U.S. Route 180; 33°50′51″N 109°08′27″W	Alpine	
3	Butterfly Lodge	Butterfly Lodge	June 17, 1992 (#92000686)	Forest Rd. 245 east of State Route 373 in the Apache National Forest; 34°01′08″N 109°26′57″W	Greer	
4	Canyon de Chelly National Monument	Canyon de Chelly National Monument	August 25, 1970 (#70000066)	Eastern side of Chinle; 36°08′21″N 109°20′05″W	Chinle	
5	Casa Malpais Site	Casa Malpais Site	October 15, 1966 (#66000936)	Address restricted 34°09′33″N 109°17′24″W	Springerville	
6	Chinle Franciscan Mission Historic District	Chinle Franciscan Mission Historic District	June 5, 2007 (#07000506)	Indian Service Route 7 across road and southwest of the Chinle Judicial complex and Police Station; 36°09′06″N 109°33′37″W	Chinle	
7	Colter Ranch Historic District	Colter Ranch Historic District	July 9, 1993 (#93000626)	Junction of 4th St. and School Bus Rd. 34°06′24″N 109°19′11″W	Eagar	
8	Eagar School	Eagar School	July 22, 1993 (#93000624)	174 S. Main St. 34°06′28″N 109°17′32″W	Eagar	Now the Eagar police station.
9	Eagar Townsite Historic District	Eagar Townsite Historic District	July 23, 1993 (#93000625)	Roughly bounded by Central Ave., Main St., 1st Ave. and Eagar St. 2nd Ave, and Harless St., 3rd Ave., and Eagar St. 34°06′45″N 109°17′25″W	Eagar	
10	Flattop Site		July 12, 1976 (#76000214)	Address restricted	Adamana	
11	Hubbell Trading Post National Historic Site	Hubbell Trading Post National Historic Site	October 15, 1966 (#66000167)	Western side of Ganado; 35°43′32″N 109°35′36″W	Ganado	
12	Isaacson Building	Isaacson Building	September 12, 1983 (#83002997)	37 Commercial St. 34°30′22″N 109°21′49″W	St. Johns	
13	Kin Tiel	Kin Tiel	May 22, 1978 (#78000540)	Address restricted	Chambers	
14	Klagetoh (Leegito) Chapter House		January 13, 2021 (#100006279)	US 191, approx. milepost 397 (west side); 35°29′58″N 109°31′48″W	Klagetoh	
15	Lake Mountain Lookout Complex	Lake Mountain Lookout Complex	January 28, 1988 (#87002453)	Off Vernon McNary Rd. 34°09′28″N 109°46′07″W	McNary	
16	Los Burros Ranger Station	Los Burros Ranger Station	October 23, 1986 (#86002854)	Forest Rd. 20; 34°08′27″N 109°45′55″W	McNary	
17	Lower Zuni River Archeological District		April 29, 1994 (#94000398)	Address restricted	St. Johns	
18	Lyman Lake Rock Art Site		August 19, 2003 (#97000347)	Address restricted	St. Johns	
19	Navajo Nation Council Chamber	Navajo Nation Council Chamber	August 18, 2004 (#04001155)	W008-013 Circle Boulevard; 35°40′58″N 109°02′54″W	Window Rock	
20	Newspaper Rock Petroglyphs Archeological District	Newspaper Rock Petroglyphs Archeological District	July 12, 1976 (#76000185)	Address restricted 34°57′44″N 109°47′57″W	Adamana	
21	Painted Desert Community Complex Historic District	Painted Desert Community Complex Historic District	April 15, 2005 (#05000284)	One Park Rd. 35°04′06″N 109°46′50″W	Petrified Forest National Park	
22	Painted Desert Inn	Painted Desert Inn	October 10, 1975 (#87001421)	West of Navajo in Petrified Forest National Park, off Interstate 40; 35°05′03″N 109°47′06″W	Navajo	Designated a National Historic Landmark on May 28, 1987
23	Petrified Forest National Park Route 66 Archaeological District		February 27, 2026 (#100012758)	Address Restricted; 35°05′03″N 109°47′06″W	Petrified Forest National Park vicinity	
24	PS Knoll Lookout Complex	PS Knoll Lookout Complex	January 28, 1988 (#87002451)	Apache-Sitgreaves National Forest; 33°45′16″N 109°23′52″W	Maverick	
25	Puerco Ruin and Petroglyphs	Puerco Ruin and Petroglyphs	July 12, 1976 (#76000208)	Address restricted 34°58′29″N 109°47′39″W	Adamana	
26	Querino Canyon Bridge	Querino Canyon Bridge	September 30, 1988 (#88001623)	Old U.S. Route 66 over Querino Canyon; 35°16′49″N 109°15′28″W	Houck	
27	Rattlesnake Point Pueblo		August 2, 2001 (#01000792)	Lyman Lake State Park; 34°21′01″N 109°21′07″W	St. Johns	
28	Sage Memorial Hospital School of Nursing		January 16, 2009 (#09000082)	Ganado Mission; 35°42′40″N 109°32′36″W	Ganado	
29	St. Michael's Mission	St. Michael's Mission	May 29, 1975 (#75000335)	North of Window Rock off State Route 264; 35°38′44″N 109°05′53″W	Window Rock	
30	Sanders Bridge	Sanders Bridge	September 30, 1988 (#88001618)	Indian Route 9402 over the Puerco River; 35°12′46″N 109°19′47″W	Sanders	
31	Sherwood Ranch Pueblo		August 17, 2005 (#05000887)	Address restricted	Springerville	
32	Thirty-Fifth Parallel Route	Thirty-Fifth Parallel Route	December 6, 1977 (#77000129)	25 miles east of Holbrook off Interstate 40; 35°04′09″N 109°46′14″W	Holbrook	
33	Twin Buttes Archeological District		July 12, 1976 (#76000952)	Address restricted	Adamana	
34	Water Canyon Administrative Site		June 10, 1993 (#93000511)	Forest Rd. 285 south of Springerville, Apache-Sitgreaves National Forest; 34°03′56″N 109°17′34″W	Springerville	

== Former listings ==
	Name on the Register	Image	Date listed	Date removed	Location	City or town	Description
1	Barth Hotel		September 5, 1975 (#75000334)	February 25, 1985	187 E. Commercial St.	St. Johns	Removed after being demolished in November, 1984
2	Petrified Forest Bridge		September 30, 1988 (#88001616)	November 27, 1998	Petrified Forest Park Rd. over Rio Puerco	Navajo vicinity	Vehicular Bridges in Arizona MPS. Removed and replaced in 1989

== See also ==
- List of National Historic Landmarks in Arizona
- National Register of Historic Places listings in Arizona
