= Sanders Bridge =

- U.S. National Register of Historic Places
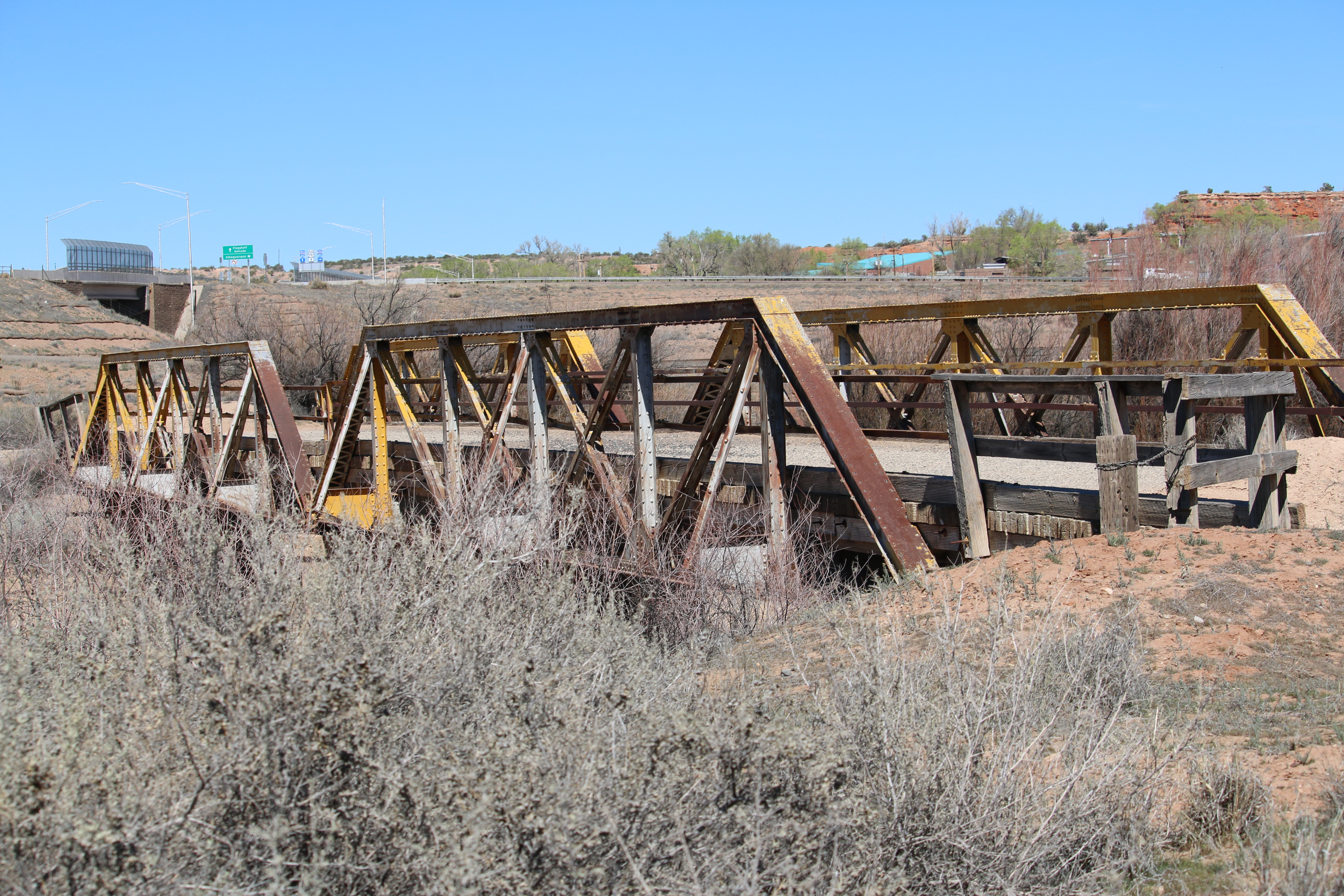

- Location within Arizona Location within the United States
- Location: Sanders, Arizona
- Coordinates: 35°12′46″N 109°19′47″W
- NRHP reference No.: 88001618
- Added to NRHP: September 30, 1988

Sanders Bridge is a steel truss bridge straddling the Puerco River, near Sanders, Arizona. It was constructed in 1923 and gained National Historic status in 1988.

== History ==
The Arizona Highway Department (AHD) began a major improvement in what was then known as the Holbrook-Lupton Highway, running between the state line with New Mexico to Adamana. The Sanders Bridge was one of two bridges included in the proposed upgrade, the other being the Allentown Bridge. Based upon engineering drawings by AHD, the Monarch Engineering Company, based in Denver, Colorado, was awarded the contract for the Sanders Bridge. Construction began on May 22, 1923, and was completed by September 10, at a cost of $15,005. This section of highway would later become part of US Route 66. However, in 1931, after another realignment of the highway system, the Sanders Bridge, along with the one at Allentown, were no longer included on Route 66. Currently, it carries local traffic on the Navajo NationNavajo Indian Reservation. It is currently owned by the U.S. Bureau of Indian Affairs.

== Description ==
The substructure consists of concrete abutments and piers, on which sit timber stringers, supporting a timber deck which is covered with asphalt. The superstructure consists of a riveted steel, 6-panel Pratt pony truss. There are two spans, 75 feet in length and 14 feet 8 inches in width, with a total length of 190 feet, when the on and off ramps are taken into account.

== See also ==
- National Register of Historic Places listings in Apache County, Arizona
