= Twin Buttes Archeological District =

- U.S. National Register of Historic Places
- Location: Adamana, Arizona
- Area: 3,200 acres (1,300 ha)
- NRHP reference No.: 76000952
- Added to NRHP: July 12, 1976

The Twin Buttes Archeological District is a prehistoric Anasazi village site, with historical significance for the period from 1000 BC through 500 AD.

== See also ==
- National Register of Historic Places listings in Apache County, Arizona
- National Register of Historic Places listings in Petrified Forest National Park
