= Rattlesnake Point Pueblo =

US NRHP ruin

- U.S. National Register of Historic Places
- Location within Arizona Location within the United States
- Location: St. Johns, Arizona
- Coordinates: 34°21′01″N 109°21′07″W
- NRHP reference No.: 01000792
- Added to NRHP: August 2, 2001

Rattlesnake Point Pueblo is a single-story masonry pueblo ruin dating from the 14th and 15th centuries A.D. It is located in Lyman Lake State Park in between St. Johns and Springerville.

== History ==
The pueblo dates from the late Pueblo IV Period, being occupied from approximately 1325 through about 1400 A.D. It was one of nine Indian settlements located on the Upper Little Colorado between Springerville and St. Johns during the Pueblo IV era. In approximately 1400, this site, along with other pueblos in the region, was systematically abandoned. This intentional abandonment is indicated by the condition of the rooms within the ruin, and their contents, which suggests that they were in constant use up until the point when the entire pueblo was abandoned. It was one of the last settlements in the area to be abandoned.

After it was abandoned, a fire swept through the pueblo, resulting in the collapse of the roof. The natural weathering over the succeeding 600 years has resulted in the degrading of the mud mortar, allowing the walls to collapse into the rooms. Currently, the site is a large pile of rubble. Arizona State University has conducted extensive archeological exploration of the site. Several rooms were completely excavated, while many other rooms were partially excavated in one by two meter sections. Walltrenching was done so as to develop a complete map of the site. Excavation revealed a rather uniform stratigraphy consisting of a top layer of recent soil of between 10 and 30 centimeters. Below this was a 60 to 120 centimeter thick layer composed of material from the collapsed walls, followed by 10 to 40 centimeter layer of collapsed roof material. The lowest layer is between 5 centimeters to 25 inches in depth consisting of cultural debris which was left behind at the time the pueblo was abandoned. The lowest two strata contain many cultural materials, including "reconstructible ceramic vessels, lithic tools and debris, plant and animal remains, and food processing materials."

Preservation efforts include stabilization of four rooms which had been completely excavated, including use of water-resistant solution on the mortar and soil floors and capping of the extant walls.

== Description ==
The pueblo sits on a ridge which sits on a ridge which extends into Lyman Reservoir. Prior to the creation of the lake, the pueblo overlooked a broad floodplain of the Little Colorado River, but is now full of water. The pueblo usually has water on three sides, but during peak capacity of the reservoir, the fourth side can also have a shallow amount of water, completely surrounding the pueblo. Rattlesnake Point sits at an elevation of 5,980 feet (1,820 m) above sea level.

Rattlesnake Point pueblo is a single-story structure constructed from local sandstone. It consists of approximately 85 rooms surrounding an open courtyard and a great kiva The walls have a smooth exterior, and are held together by mud mortar, with a ratio of 50-50 between sandstone and mortar, and some are plastered on the inside. The walls are between 25 and 35 cm and were approximately 2 meters tall; many of the rooms had two beams running the longer axis of each room, with smaller crossbeams, which were covered by smaller pieces of wood and a mixture of reeds and mud mortar. The rooms are of various sizes, averaging about 9.25 square meters, with some as small as five square meters ranging all the way up to 13.25 meters square. While there was one plastered floor and another was partially paved with stone, most are simple packed earth. Several rooms had doors, however most rooms were entered through the roof, via a ladder. Several windows in the west wall also existed.

Petroglyphs found on the site include birds, butterflies, dogs and/or coyotes, katsinas, lizards, mountain lions, scorpions, and snakes. While a high percentage of the petroglyphs found onsite were of mountain lions and birds, the actual percentage of remains of those types of fauna were less than 1%.

The creation of Lyman Reservoir has created an erosion issue along the eastern and southeastern sections of the pueblo. When the reservoir is at maximum depth, waves break against these portions, leading to erosion downslope.

== See also ==
- National Register of Historic Places listings in Apache County, Arizona
