= Lyman Lake Rock Art Site =

Archaeological site in Arizona, U.S.

Coordinates: 34°21′58″N 109°22′31″W

- U.S. National Register of Historic Places
- Location within Arizona Location within the United States
- Location: St. Johns, Arizona
- NRHP reference No.: 97000347
- Added to NRHP: 19 August 2003

Lyman Lake Rock Art Site is a site significant to North American Archaeology. Located in Arizona, United States, in Lyman Lake State Park, the site exhibits traditional rock art or petroglyphs.

== See also ==
- National Register of Historic Places listings in Apache County, Arizona
