= Puerco Ruin and Petroglyphs =

NRHP Anasazi ruins in Arizona

- U.S. National Register of Historic Places
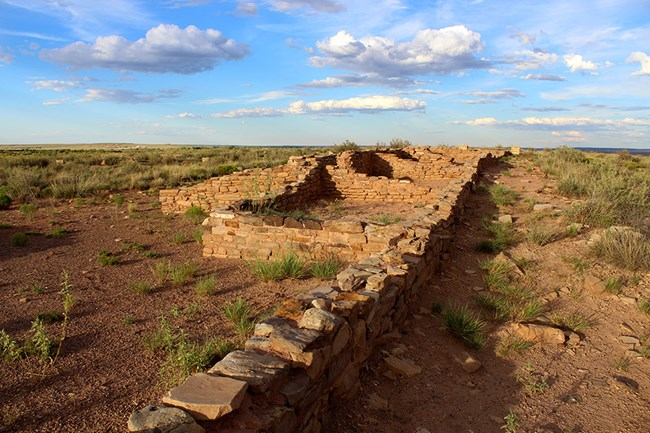
- Late afternoon light on Puerco Pueblo ruins

- Location within Arizona Location within the United States
- Location: Adamana, Arizona
- Coordinates: 34°58′34″N 109°47′39″W
- Area: 9 acres (3.6 ha)
- NRHP reference No.: 76000208
- Added to NRHP: July 12, 1976

Puerco Ruin and Petroglyphs are the ruins of a large Indian pueblo, which reached its peak around 1300 CE, containing over 100 rooms. It is the largest known archeological site within the Petrified Forest National Park.

== History ==
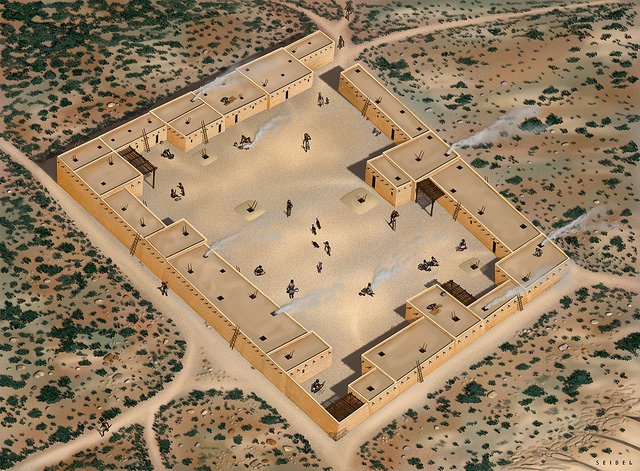
Artist depiction of Puerco Pueblo

The site had two periods of occupation, each lasting about one century: from 1100 to 1200 and 1300–1400. The Ancestral Puebloans (also known as the Anasazi), used the flood plain of the Puerco River to cultivate corn, beans, and squash. They also made baskets and colored pottery. The river was also a trade route, opening the pueblo to both trade and ideas from other areas. The settlement had contact with both the Hopi people to the west and the Mogollon people to the south. The site dates to the late Pueblo III to middle Pueblo IV periods. The second, and largest period of occupation occurred during the 1300s. After a series of droughts in the area, the indigenous people moved from small scattered communities to larger pueblo dwellings. By the late 1300s, climatic changes occurred which caused the inhabitants to abandon the location, and it was deserted by 1380.

The site was first excavated by John Muir in 1905 and 1906.

== Description ==
The pueblo was built out of hand-hewn sandstone blocks in a rectangular shape, surrounding an interior plaza. The single story consisted of rooms used as living quarters and storage areas. Kivas, where ceremonies took place, were also present underground. The exterior walls of the pueblo contained no windows or doors, entry was accomplished by ladders over the walls.

== Artifacts and petroglyphs ==
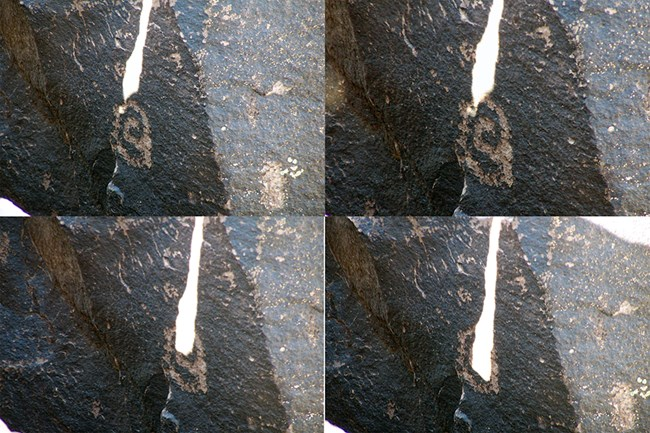
Solar petroglyph at Puerco Pueblo

The site contains over 800 petroglyphs, incised on more than 100 boulders. One of the petroglyphs which has been uncovered at the site appears to show the migration path from the Puerco Pueblo to the Crack-in-the-Rock site, today located within the Wupatki National Monument, dating from approximately 1150.

Between 1988 and 1989 a group of archeologists from the Western Archeological and Conservation Center conducted excavations of the site. They also recorded over 1,000 pieces of rock art on the site. 8 non-room subsurface features, 4 surface rooms, and a kiva were excavated. More than 4,000 potsherds, 26,000 flaked stone artifacts, and numerous floral and faunal remains were catalogued. The artifacts uncovered indicate trade with the Hopi, Homol'ovi, Flagstaff, Zuni, and Gallup settlements, although many items were made from local raw materials.

A petroglyph which marks the summer solstice has been found at the site. For approximately two weeks around the solstice, there is an interplay between the sun's rays and shadows across its circular design at sunrise.

While the historical record shows that over 90% of the local fauna was represented by small mammals such as rabbits and prairie dogs, and about 1% birds, with zero bear remains, the petroglyphs show different results, with bears being the most predominate, accounting for 21% of the petroglyphs, and birds making up 16%.

== See also ==
- National Register of Historic Places listings in Apache County, Arizona
- National Register of Historic Places listings in Petrified Forest National Park
