= Newspaper Rock Petroglyphs Archeological District =

United States historic place in Apache County, Arizona

- U.S. National Register of Historic Places
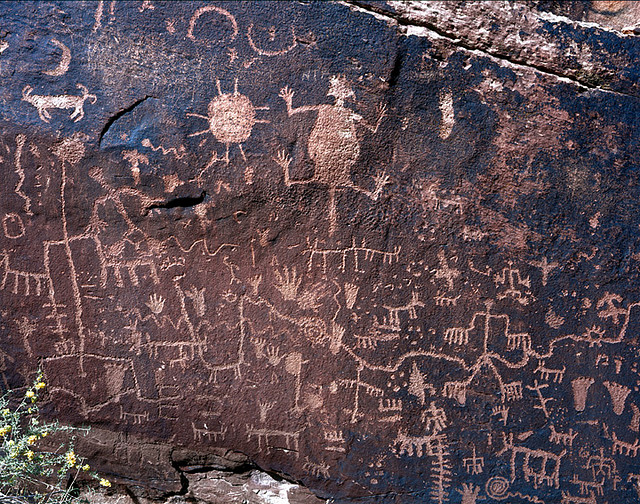
- Newspaper Rock Petroglyphs

- Location within Arizona Location within the United States
- Nearest city: Adamana
- Coordinates: 34.9621°N 109.7991°W
- Area: 45 acres (18 ha)
- NRHP reference No.: 76000185
- Added to NRHP: July 12, 1976

The Newspaper Rock Petroglyphs Archeological District is part of the Petrified Forest National Park, and contains in excess of 650 petroglyphs, believed to have been created 1000–1500 CE. This Apache County site near Adamana, Arizona was listed on the National Register of Historic Places July 12, 1976.

== See also ==
- National Register of Historic Places listings in Apache County, Arizona
- National Register of Historic Places listings in Petrified Forest National Park
