= Flattop Site =

- U.S. National Register of Historic Places
- Location within Arizona Location within the United States
- Location: Adamana, Arizona, within the Petrified Forest National Park
- Coordinates: 35°05′17″N 109°48′23″W
- NRHP reference No.: 76000214
- Added to NRHP: July 12, 1976

The Flattop Site is a prehistoric location situated within the boundaries of the Petrified Forest National Park, near Adamana, Arizona. The site was inhabited by the Basketmaker II culture from approximately 1-300 AD. In 1949–1950 the site, consisting of roughly 25 pit-houses, was excavated by Fred Wendorf. Among the objects excavated were about fourteen projectile points. In 1953 Wendorf again excavated the site, revealing "Adamana brown" pottery, a plain brown pottery from the Basketmaker III culture.

== See also ==
- National Register of Historic Places listings in Apache County, Arizona
- National Register of Historic Places listings in Petrified Forest National Park
