= Kin Tiel =

- U.S. National Register of Historic Places
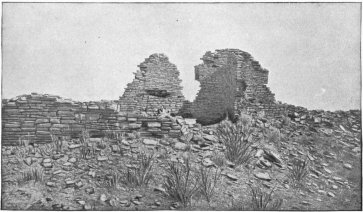
- Kin Tiel standing walls
- Location: Chambers, Arizona
- Area: 30 acres (12 ha)
- NRHP reference No.: 78000540
- Added to NRHP: May 22, 1978

Kin Tiel, also known as the Wide Ruins, is an historic site listed on the National Register of Historic Places, located about fifty miles north of Chambers, Arizona, in Apache County. It is the ruins of a large pueblo, which has undergone extensive exploration and excavation. It was added to the register on May 22, 1978.

== History ==
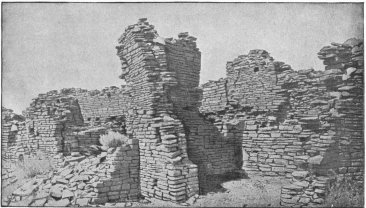
Kin Tiel north wing

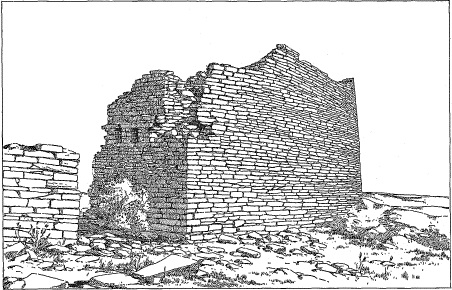
Drawing of Kin Tiel gateway

The pueblo was constructed in 1276 AD, and was constructed all at once, consisting of over 1300 rooms in 3 stories. Victor Mindeleff visited the ruins in the 1880s, at which point much of the outer wall was still extant, to a height of two stories. Pottery found at the site as become known as the "Kin Tiel focus" of the "Rio Puerco" pattern. The National Geographic Society excavated the site in 1929. Most of the stones which were still standing in walls were pulled down to construct a trading post nearby in about 1895. That trading post was subsequently torn down in the 1980s.

Currently, there is an excavation project underway on the site, under the joint auspices of the Historic American Buildings Survey (HABS) and Historic American Engineering Record (HAER). The project is utilizing numerous modern technologies to identify and catalog the ancient artifacts, including 3-D laser scanning, ground penetrating radar and magnetometers.

== Description ==
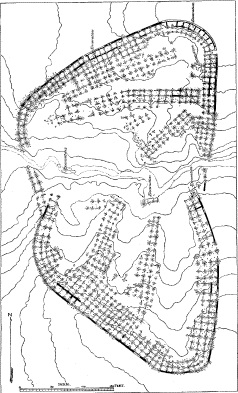
Kin Tiel site plan

The pueblo is located approximately midway between the Tusayan and Cibola pueblos, about 23 miles north of Navajo Springs, and about 17 miles north of Chambers. The pueblo had an outer contiguous wall, 3 stories tall, with very small and sporadic openings near the ground. On the inside of the wall were terraces facing inclosed courts.

There are two wings of almost equal size, one on either side of a central wash, which runs from east to west. The houses inside the wall in the northern half run roughly parallel with the wall, with a single exception near the east. The houses on the southern half, however, were constructed at right angles to the wall. This was due to the geographical conditions: the rooms to the south are situated on two long ridges, while those to the north are also built on high ground which runs along the wall. There are only three entrances to the pueblo's interior: one just south of the east end of the arroyo, one near the northeastern corner, and the third in the north wall. While there might have been additional entrances, the current ruins do not indicate their existence. The site was populated for a significant amount of time, as evidenced by the large refuse heap to the south. The pueblo was self-contained, with no significant structures outside the wall. To the north there are rectangles which indicate a graveyard. It is built in the Chacoan style of pueblo, covering approximately 30 acres, making it one of the largest pueblo sites in the southwest.

== See also ==
- National Register of Historic Places listings in Apache County, Arizona
