= Thirty-Fifth Parallel Route =

NRHP location in Arizona

- U.S. National Register of Historic Places
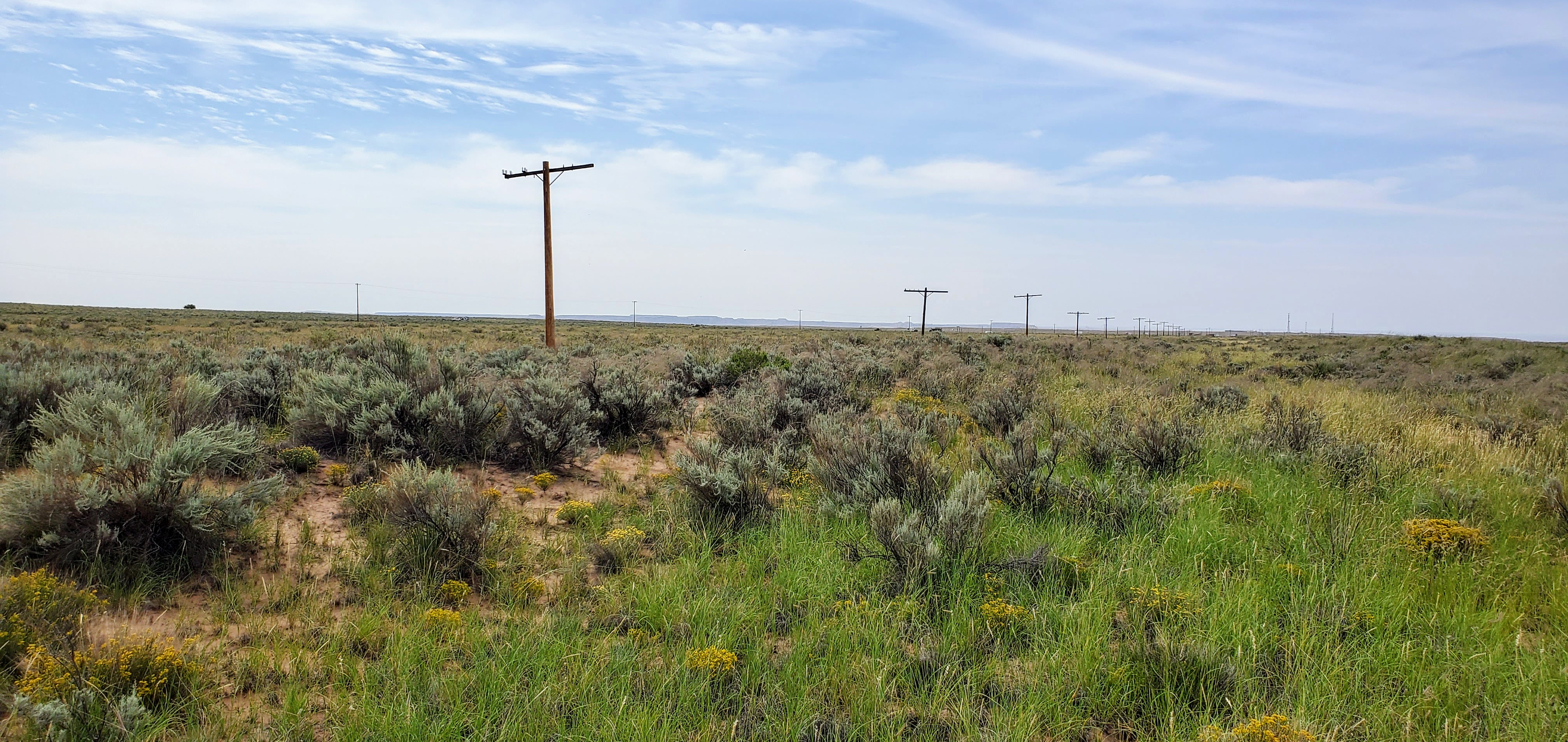
- Original grade of U.S. 66 through the Petrified Forest National Park, 2022

- Location within Arizona Location within the United States
- Location: Holbrook, Arizona
- Coordinates: 35°04′09″N 109°46′14″W
- NRHP reference No.: 77000129
- Added to NRHP: December 6, 1977

The Thirty-Fifth Parallel Route is the remains of a wagon trail within Petrified Forest National Park. While there is a railroad and a modern highway contiguous with the site, they are not part of the Historic designation.

== History ==
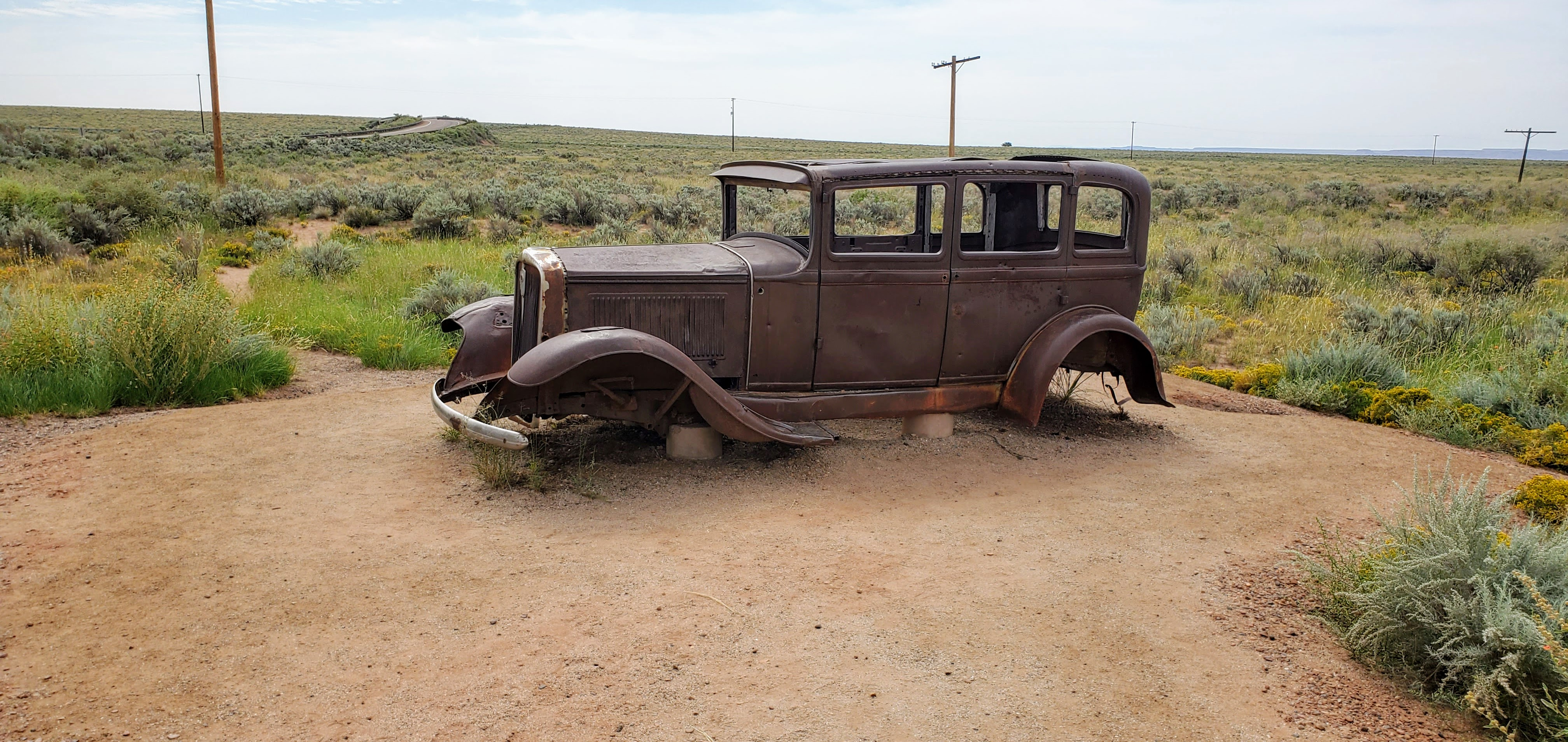
Car on display at original U.S. Hwy. 66 overlook at Petrified Forest N.P., 2022

The first use of the route during historic times was by hunters, trappers, and American Indians. While American Indians most likely used the route back through pre-historic times, European settlers first began using it during the 1830s and 1840s, with the incursions made by traders and hunter/trappers. With its acquisition of what is today Arizona from Mexico in the Treaty of Guadalupe Hidalgo in 1848, the U.S. Army's Corps of Topographical Engineers began an official survey of the area, which was followed in 1851 by exploration of the area by Lorenzo Sitgreaves on his exploration tour between New Mexico and California. As part of a sequence of six surveys for a transcontinental railway, the route was surveyed in 1853-54 by Amiel Weeks Whipple, who completed the first complete, detailed examination of the route. From between August 1857 to January 1858, Edward Fitzgerald Beale was in charge of developing a wagon route, along the route laid out by Whipple 3 years earlier. In addition to being the event which established the wagon trail, Beale's expedition was notable for its use of camels. This was so novel that the route became known as the "Beale Camel Trail".

By the 1880s the Atlantic and Pacific Railroad had constructed its western division for their intercontinental rail line, paralleling this wagon route. The Atchison, Topeka and Santa Fe Railway took over this stretch of track in the 1890s. Absorbed by the Santa Fe Railway, which today is part of the BNSF Railway, this section of rail is part of their main transcontinental line. With the arrival of automobiles in the early 20th century, the wagon trail evolved into what became U.S. Route 66, and eventually Interstate 40, although not on exactly the same exact route. Some original sections of the original wagon road remain intact within the Petrified Forest National Park. Neither the rail nor highway is part of the National Historic Site. There are no physical structures or buildings within the site.

== Description ==
The route travels along a path about one mile south of the Painted Desert rim. The extant traces of the route enters the Petrified Forest National Park at Navajo Springs, Arizona in the east, traveling in a generally southwest direction for about six miles before it exists the park on its southern boundary. Just outside the site are the ruins of a wagon station which sits alongside Lithodendron Wash. The remnants of the wagon road can be seen as eroded tracks which were cut by the animals and iron-rimmed wheels of wagons and stagecoaches which traversed the trail during the latter half of the 19th century and the beginning of the 20th.

== See also ==
- National Register of Historic Places listings in Apache County, Arizona
- National Register of Historic Places listings in Petrified Forest National Park
