= Casa Malpaís =

Historic place in Apache County, Arizona

- Casa Malpaís Archaeological Park and Museum
- U.S. National Register of Historic Places
- U.S. National Historic Landmark
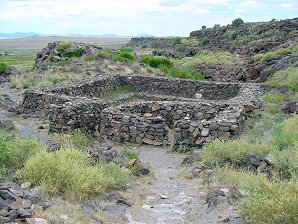
- The Kiva

- Location within Arizona Location within the United States
- Nearest city: Springerville, Arizona
- Built: 1240
- NRHP reference No.: 66000936

Significant dates
- Added to NRHP: October 15, 1966
- Designated NHL: July 19, 1964

Casa Malpaís is an archaeological site of the Ancestral Puebloans located near the town of Springerville, Arizona. The site is a nationally recognized archaeological site and was declared a National Historic Landmark in 1964.

== Description ==
Casa Malpaís was built around 1260 and was inhabited until about 1400, meaning that the site dates from the Pueblo III to the Pueblo IV Era. It is one of the latest dated Mogollon sites. The name Casa Malpaís is Spanish for "House of the Badlands". The Springerville volcanic field contains over 400 volcanoes within a fifty-mile radius of Springerville, making it the third-largest volcanic field in the continental United States.

Unique and unusual features characterize the site. The Great Kiva, painstakingly constructed of volcanic rock, is the centerpiece. A steep basalt staircase set into a crevice of the high basalt cliff wall leads to the top of the mesa.

Both the Hopi and Zuni peoples still consider Casa Malpaís a sacred ancestral place.

The site is at an elevation of 7,000 feet and the pueblo is perched atop terraces in front of basalt cliffs. These cliffs were formed from lava flow from an ancient volcano. Around 1240, a 60-room pueblo, solar calendar, and Great Kiva were built by the people. The site was believed to be abandoned by 1350.

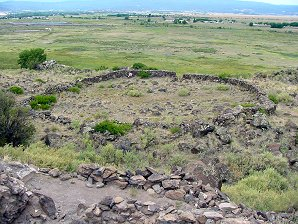
The Solar Calendar

Artifacts were excavated and collected over time. The Casa Malpaís collection includes 156 boxes of potsherds and other artifacts from the ruins. Special butterfly collection. Most of the artifacts found in the 1990s are displayed in the Casa Malpaís museum.

== Solar Calendar ==
This feature consists of a low stone wall enclosing a space 26 meters in diameter, with 5 gates. Part of the structure has been restacked, indicating an approximate possible height of 1.2 meters. "An opening on the structure's northern side appears to be oriented to true north" (Zoll 2012) Another, on the southwest side of the structure, is offset to allow a distinctive rectangular shaft of light to enter in a direct line with the wall during sunset at summer solstice (Zoll 2012, p. 15). At winter solstice, the shaft of light once again enters through the gate and extends to about the middle of the enclosure (Zoll 2012, p. 14). During the equinoxes, the sun enters again through the gate and "produces a distinctive rectangular shaft of light" (Zoll 2012, p. 15).

Outside this circular feature, is a Bear Claw petroglyph, which at vernal equinox sunset, fits into a shaft of light produced by a natural rock grouping. " Both the Hopi and Zuni have bear clans or bear societies who may have created this image for reasons unknown" (Zoll 2012 p. 18).

== Discovery ==
The first visit to Casa Malpaís by a professional anthropologist was in 1883, when Frank Cushing, an anthropologist living at Zuni Pueblo, New Mexico, visited a site at "El Valle Redondo on the Colorado Chiquito", and was impressed by what he termed "the fissure type pueblo" he found there. In his journal he sketched dry masonry bridging fissures, upon which the pueblo is constructed.

== Casa Malpais Visitor Center and Museum ==
The Casa Malpais Visitor Center and Museum, operated by the City of Springerville, is located on Main Street in Springerville, Arizona. The museum displays artifacts found at Casa Malpais and offers guided tours of the site that originate at the museum.

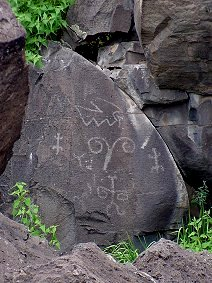
Summer Solstice Marker.

== See also ==
- National Register of Historic Places listings in Apache County, Arizona
