= Lower Zuni River Archeological District =

- U.S. National Register of Historic Places
- Location: St. Johns, Arizona
- Area: 29,500 acres (11,900 ha)
- NRHP reference No.: 94000398
- Added to NRHP: April 29, 1994

The Lower Zuni River Archeological District is an area of approximately 29,500 acres, comprising 89 distinct archeological sites. It is located approximately 24 miles northeast of St. Johns, Arizona, at the Arizona–New Mexico border, along the Zuni River.

== History ==
The area was inhabited during the period from A.D. 800 to A.D. 1175. The sites contain ceramic pottery, as well as sandstone rubble deposits which show the use of above-ground masonry. There are also petroglyphs and pictographs, as well as inscriptions. The earlier settlement led to a cohesive dispersed community between 1050 and 1175. While nearby communities continued to be inhabited after 1175, there is no evidence that the Zuni River District remained inhabited after this point in time. Between 1880 and 1885 Adolph Bandelier travelled through the area and recorded sites at Ojo Bonito and Ceadro Springs. Leslie Spier explored the area in 1917, collecting samples and conducting minor excavations. Spier was the first one to establish a chronology of the historic settlement of the area. In 1931 the site of Kiatuthlanna was excavated, revealing occupation between 700–1100 CE, showing pithouses, jacal structures, and a 49-room pueblo with 4 kivas. The sites at Hawikuh and Kechipawan were excavated between 1923 and approximately 1931. William Beeson located 325 sites within the district between 1956 and 1958. Beeson dated these sites from the Basketmaker III Era through the Pueblo IV Period

In 1984 an extensive archeological project was begun in the district, called the Ojo Bonito Archaeological Project and spearheaded by Keith Kintigh. In its first 6 years, 450 sites have been identified. Evidence of occupation prior to 700 is not to be found in any depth. A single Paleo-Indian site, revealing projectile points consisting of a Clovis point base, two Pinto Basin points, was located between the Zuni River and Jaralosa Draw. The earliest period of occupation was from 700 to the early 900s, the Basketmaker III and early Pueblo I phases, showing pithouse occupation along the lower flood plain of the Zuni River to the upper areas of the mesas. The ceramic fragments discovered are of the Lino and plain gray types, Kiatuthlanna Black-on-White, and Mogollon Brownwares.

The next period of occupation was from the 900s until approximately 1050, the Pueblo I Period through the early Pueblo II Period. The sites include masonry walls, storage pits, hearths, and well-defined rooms. Between 1050 and 1175 there was a single settlement on the site. Archeological evidence shows rooms, kiva depressions, and middens. The individual housing units are in clusters of 7–12 units, with several hundred meters separating the clusters, which is similar to other Chacoan settlements. The site became uninhabited after 1175.

In 1539 Francisco Vázquez de Coronado passed through the district, on his search for the Seven Cities of Gold. His expedition camped somewhere along the Zuni River, near the Zuni village of Hawikuh.

== Description ==
The District is located completely inside the borders of the Hinkson Ranch. It begins at the Arizona–New Mexico border which serves as its western border, running along the Zuni River, with its southern border following the floodplain of that river. Its eastern border is an entrenched arroyo, while its northern border follows existing fence lines and dirt roads. The site contains the following:

- 2 Prehistoric rockshelters
- 7 Artifact scatters
- 23 Pithouse scatters
- 17 Rubble scatters
- 16 Roomblocks
- 6 Stone features
- 14 Petroglyphs/Pictographs
- 1 Historic residence
- 6 Corrals

The one historic residence is a dwelling which was built by Dan Dubois, a friend of Frank Cushing, in the late 1880s. The homestead was a multi-room masonry house, a stone corral and a spring. The spring was known as Deer Springs, and is no longer flowing.

== See also ==
- National Register of Historic Places listings in Apache County, Arizona
