= Isaacson Building =

USA NRHP building

- U.S. National Register of Historic Places
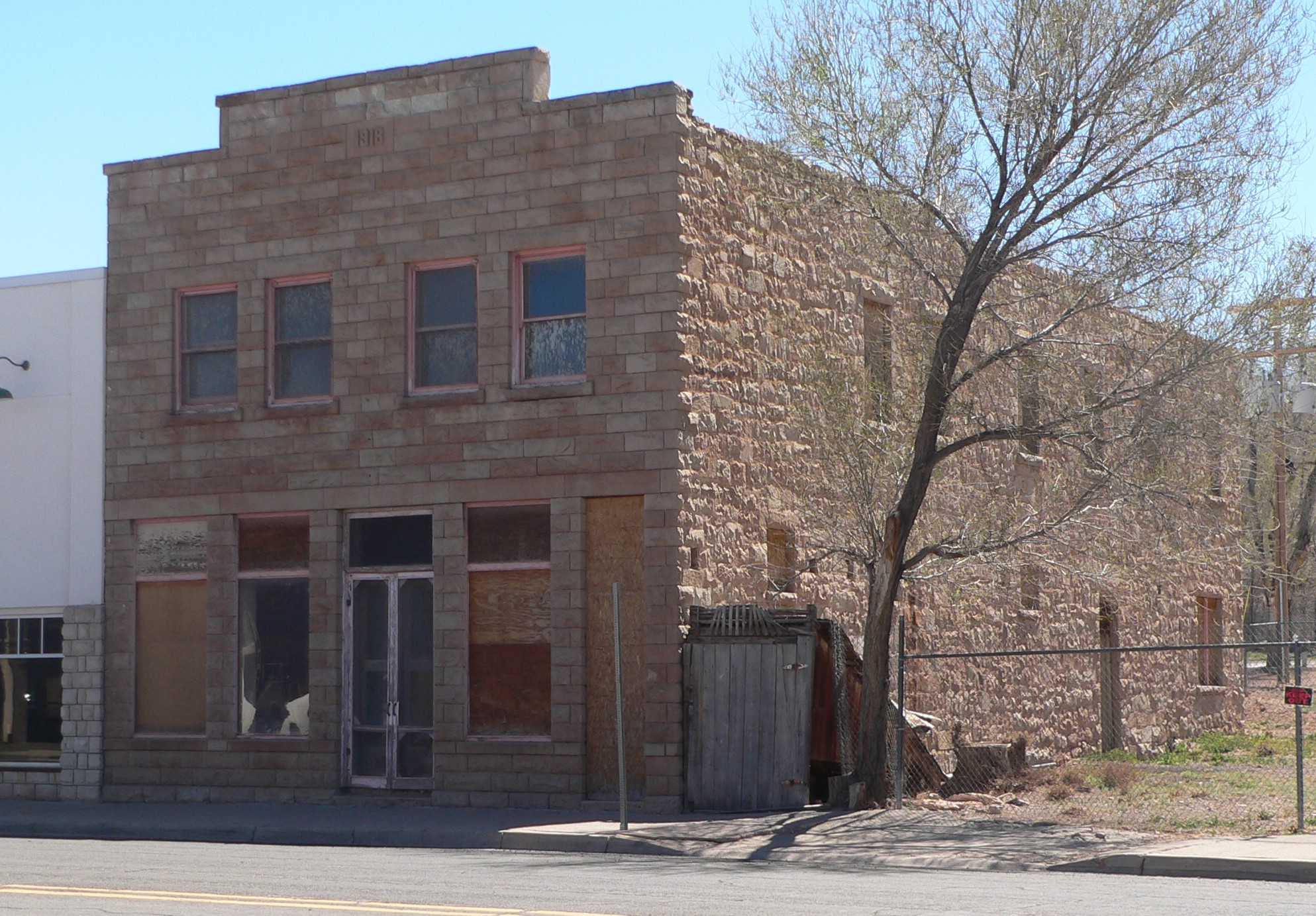

- Location within Arizona Location within the United States
- Location: St. Johns, Arizona
- Coordinates: 34°30′22″N 109°21′49″W
- Architectural style: Early commercial
- NRHP reference No.: 83002997
- Added to NRHP: September 12, 1983

The Isaacson Building is a two-story commercial structure, built in 1918 of local granite. It is located in St. Johns, Arizona in Apache County.

== History ==
By the mid-1500s, the Little Colorado River Valley was settled by a predominantly Mexican population. There were several small towns in existence by the 1870s, including El Vadito, which would be renamed first San Juan, and later St. Johns. It is the only one of these early settlements still extant. Mormons from Utah begin to immigrate to the valley during the 1860s-1880s, with the intent of establishing a Mormon church along the Little Colorado River. They intermingled in El Vadito with the existing Mexican population. Also during this period, the town grew with an inflow of cattlemen, farmers, and sheepherders. In 1879, the now named St. Johns was designated the country seat of the newly formed Apache County.

In 1876, Isaac Isaacson emigrated to Brigham City, Arizona, near present-day Winslow. When that town failed, he moved north of St. Johns in 1882, and at the turn of the century he moved into St. Johns proper. In 1918, using local materials which his companies provided, he constructed the Isaacson Building on Commercial Street in St. Johns. The construction was done by a local builder, Genaro Acosta.

== Description ==
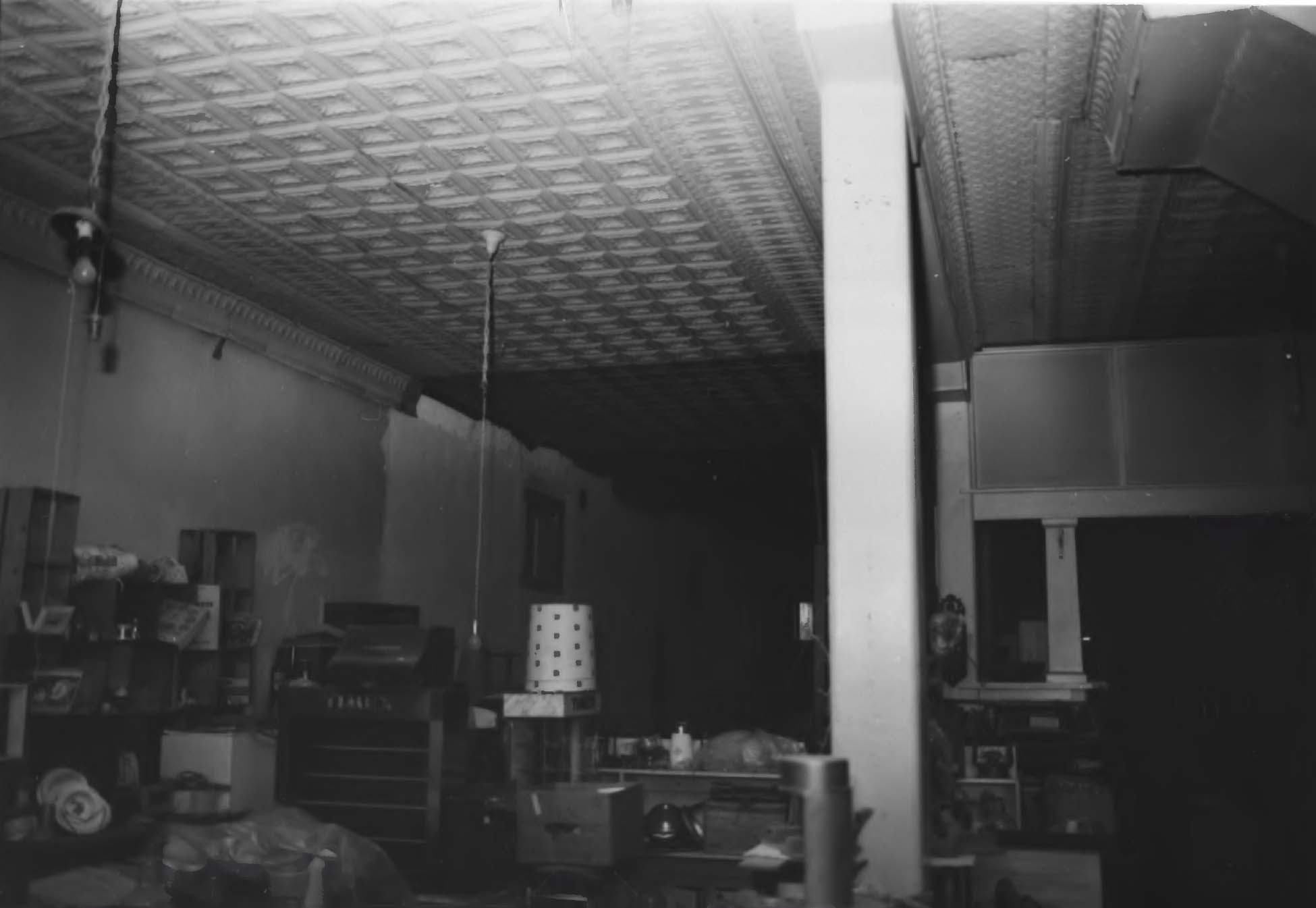
Interior of first floor, showing pressed metal ceiling

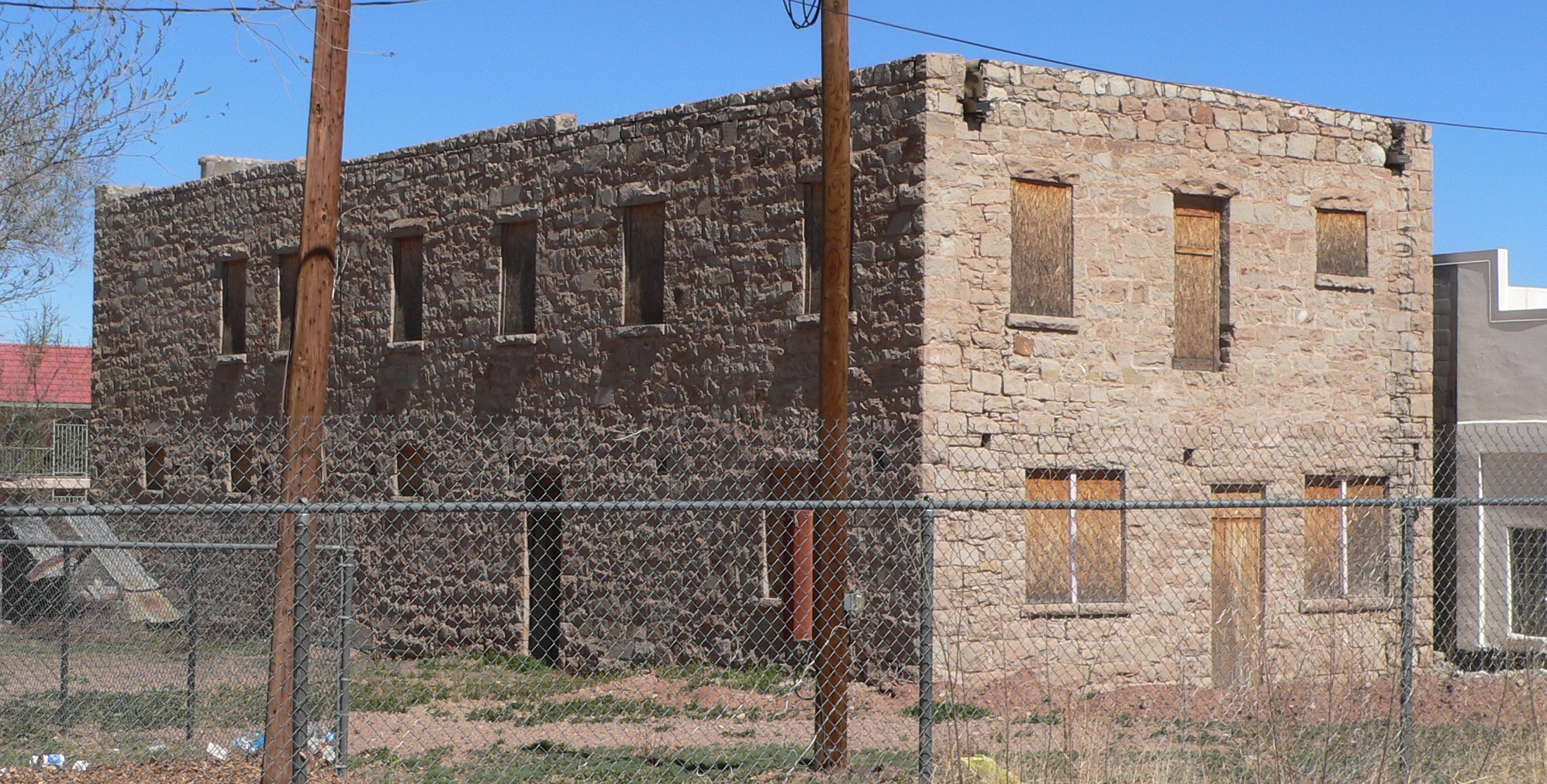
The west and southern (rear) sides of the building

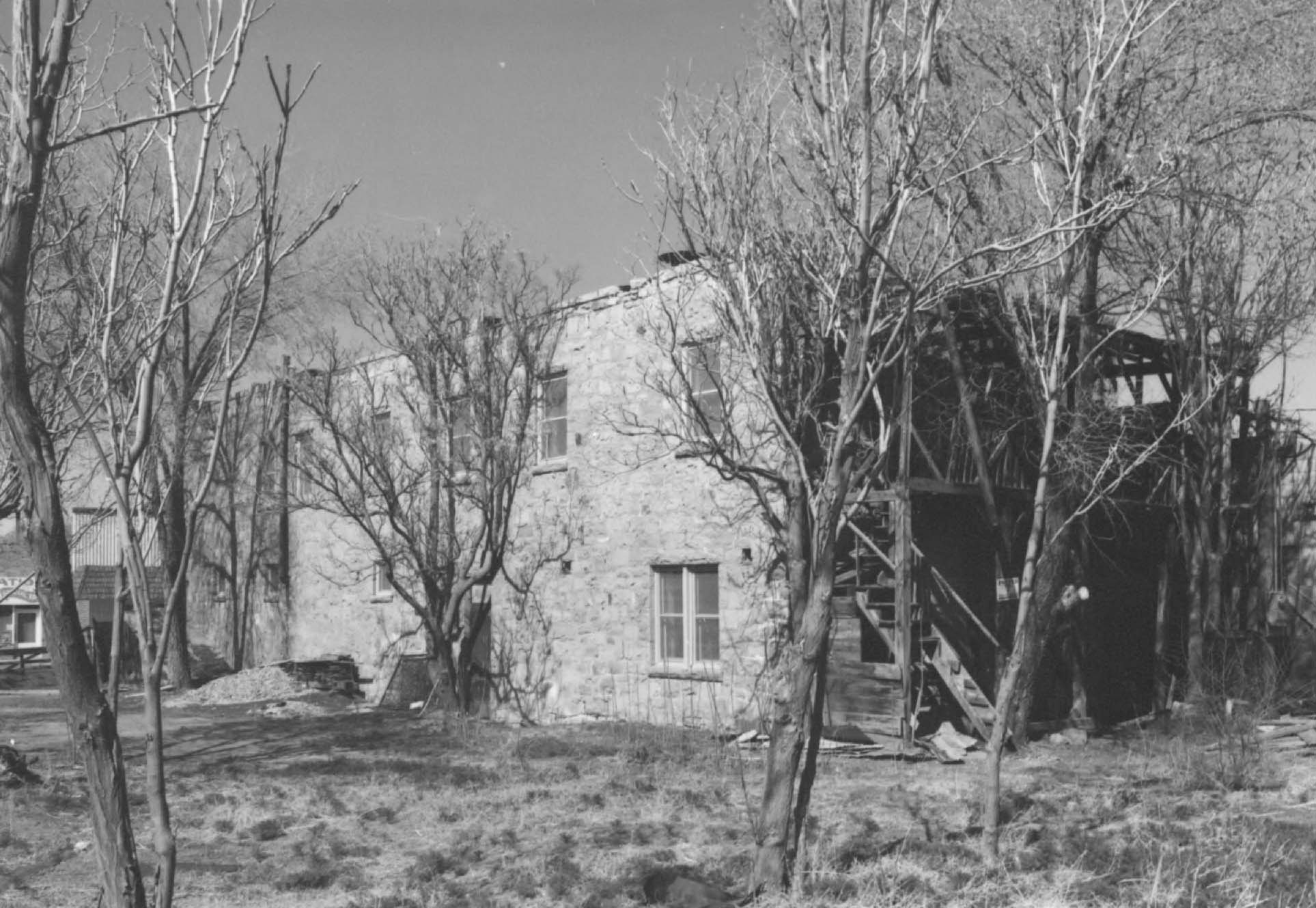
Rear of building, ca. 1983, showing wooden porch

The building is a rectangular-shaped two-story structure, measuring 30 feet in width and 80 feet in depth. It is constructed of textured granite which was quarried locally, the stone is set in even courses, and forms a rusticated stone façade with a stepped parapet. The National Park Service report states, "Of particular interest is the variegated nature of the stone which, in combination with the rough texture, adds a visual complexity to the otherwise straightforward facade." Centered on the level directly below the parapet is a carved inscription which gives the year of the building's construction: 1918. There are five bays facing the street (the north side), with a raised central entry with double doors. The entry is flanked by two plate glass display windows to the east and a single plate window to the west, along with an entry to the second floor. This second entry has a double transom which includes a detailed leaded glass window. The upper floor has four one-over-one sash windows with stone sills and lintels. The west side has three small windows set high and towards the front of the first floor, a narrow doorway approximately two-thirds of the way towards the rear, and then paired one-over-one sash windows. The second story has six one-over-one sash units, unevenly spaced. All windows on this side have stone lintels and sills. The south side of the building has a single door entry, slightly off-center, flanked by paired double-hung windows on either side. The second story also includes a single door entry, flanked by two unequally sized windows. The door used to lead out onto a wooden porch. As with the west side, all the windows have stone sills and lintels. The east wall is contiguous with the building next door. The shallow gable roof cannot be seen due to the parapet wall.

The interior of the building consists of two floors. The first floor has a hardwood floor, finished plaster walls, and a pressed metal ceiling. The floor is divided by a square concrete posts with a central beam, creating two bays. The second floor has two large rooms in the front of the building, with an additional ten smaller rooms, five on either side of a central corridor. The second floor also has hardwood floors and plaster walls. There is also an attic and basement.

== See also ==
- National Register of Historic Places listings in Apache County, Arizona
