= PS Knoll Lookout Complex =

- U.S. National Register of Historic Places
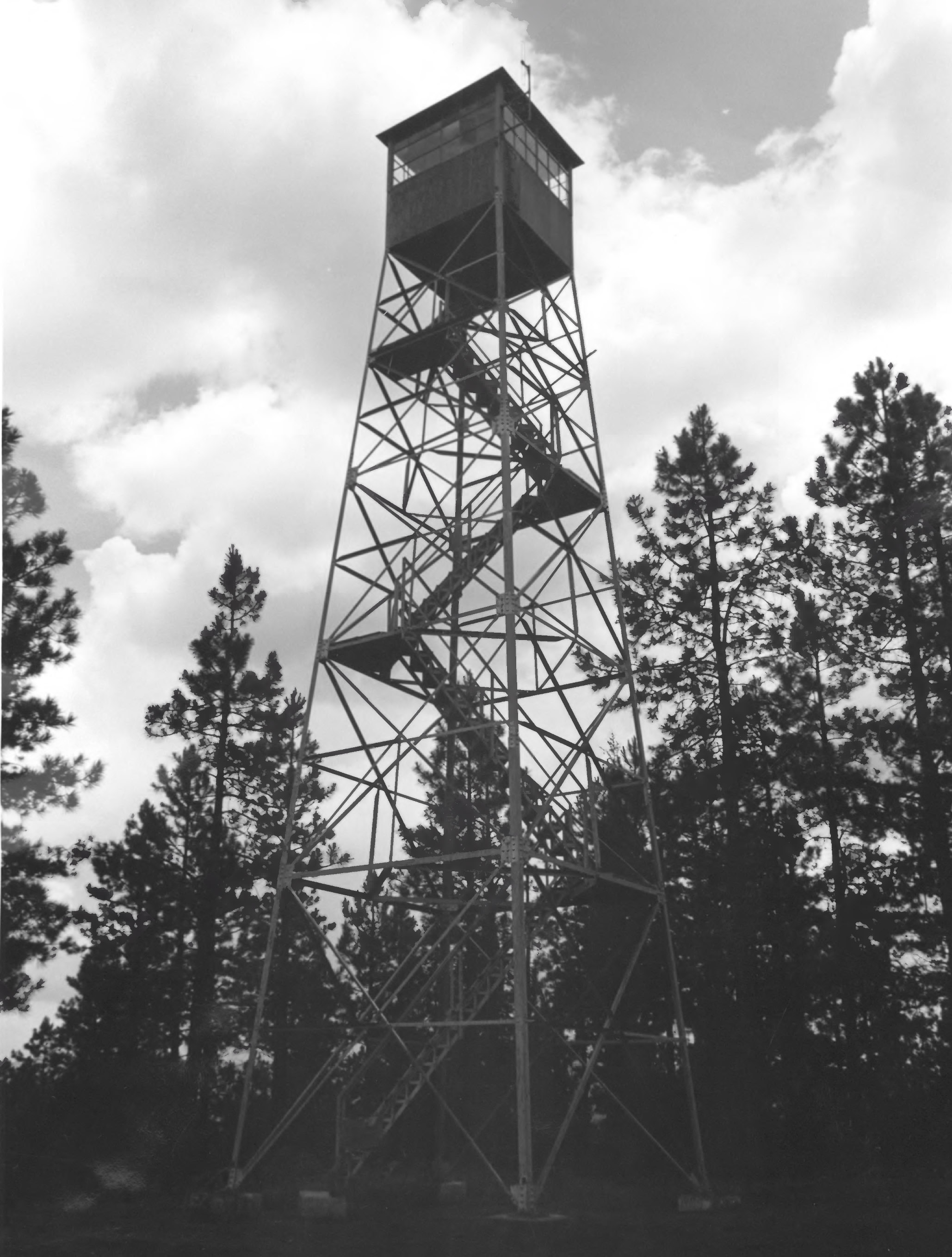
- PS Knoll Lookout Tower

- Location within Arizona Location within the United States
- Location: Maverick, Arizona
- Coordinates: 33°45′16″N 109°23′52″W
- Area: 9 acres (3.6 ha)
- NRHP reference No.: 87002451
- Added to NRHP: January 28, 1988

The PS Knoll Lookout Complex is a fire lookout tower and accompanying cabin located in the Apache-Sitgreaves National Forest. It was constructed in the mid-1930s. The nine-acre site consists of three contributing buildings and one contributing structure. The buildings are a house, storage shed, and outhouse; the structure is the lookout tower. The lookout sits at an elevation of 8,045 feet (2,452 m), and rises to a height of 45.9 feet (14.0 m). It was constructed by the Aermotor Windmill Company in 1933.

== See also ==
- National Register of Historic Places listings in Apache County, Arizona
