= Sherwood Ranch Pueblo =

- U.S. National Register of Historic Places
- Aerial view of the pueblo ruin
- Location: Springerville, Arizona
- NRHP reference No.: 05000887
- Added to NRHP: August 17, 2005

Sherwood Ranch Pueblo is an historic pueblo located overlooking the Little Colorado River, near Springerville, Arizona. It has two areas of habitation, consisting of over 800 rooms and was inhabited from approximately 1000-1450 A.D.

== History ==
The older section of the pueblo was inhabited during the Pueblo III Period, from 1250 to 1300. It has a variety of masonry styles, and several different building materials were used, including large sandstone boulders, smaller sandstone, and river cobblestones. At the southern end of the northern pueblo rests a large great kiva, with an eastern entry ramp. The construction began with a few central rooms, and as the population grew additional rooms were added as necessary, without any central plan. The great kiva was constructed first, along with a suite of rooms immediately adjacent. The additional rooms were added as needed to the north and east of this original structure.

The newer, southern section was inhabited from 1310 to 1370. It was a much more planned construction, with rooms constructed of tabular sandstone arranged in a geometric grid pattern around the central plaza, which in turn had a single rectangular great kiva on its southern side.

The pueblo was one of the largest situated in Little Colorado River valley, and one of the few which was continuously inhabited throughout the Pueblo III and Pueblo IV periods. The ancient pueblo residents constructed numerous irrigation canals, utilizing the waters of the river.

Excavations were conducted on the site during the 1980s and 1990s by the White Mountain Archaeological Center, although no papers were published regarding those excavations, and any artifacts from those digs have not been shared with the public.

== Description ==
Sherwood Ranch Pueblo had formerly been known by the name "Raven Ruin", but became known by the name of the ranch on which it was located when it was donated to The Archaeological Conservancy in 2003 by Ruth and Wendell Sherwood. The site clearly has two distinct areas of habitation, the older is situated to the north, with the newer portion is at the southern end of the site. The site was inhabited from approximately 1000 through 1450 A.D., and has features of both the Mogollon and Anasazi cultures, to the south and north respectively. It contains two kivas and estimates of the total number of rooms varying from 250 to over 800. The pueblo is claimed as ancestral by both the Hopi and Zuni tribes, and was one of the last settlements to be abandoned at the end of the Pueblo IV era.

== See also ==
- National Register of Historic Places listings in Apache County, Arizona
