= Painted Desert Community Complex Historic District =

Historic district in Arizona, United States

- U.S. National Register of Historic Places
- U.S. National Historic Landmark District
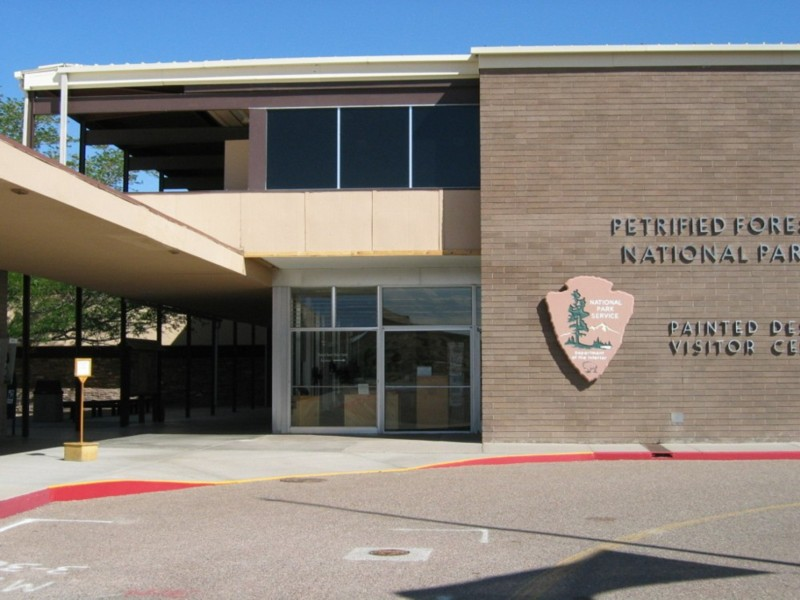

- Location within Arizona Location within the United States
- Location: One Park Rd., Petrified Forest National Park, Arizona
- Coordinates: 35°4′6″N 109°46′50″W
- Area: 240 acres (97 ha)
- Architect: Neutra, Richard; Alexander, Robert
- Architectural style: Modern Movement, International Style
- NRHP reference No.: 05000284, 100000838

Significant dates
- Added to NRHP: April 15, 2005
- Designated NHLD: December 23, 2016

The Painted Desert Community Complex is the administrative center of Petrified Forest National Park. The community center includes administrative facilities, utility structures and National Park Service employee housing, planned by architects Richard Neutra and Robert Alexander as part of the Mission 66 park facilities improvement program. Work on the community began in 1961 and was completed by 1965. The complex contrasts with earlier Park Service architecture that sought to blend with the environment. The Painted Desert community used straight manufactured materials that deliberately draw a contrast with the natural environment.

The most significant building is the Painted Desert Visitor Center, designed as a severely modernist structure that includes administrative offices., a visitor center, an auditorium, a clinic and staff apartments. Other structures include a community center, school and a Fred Harvey Company concession building.

Neutra and Alexander paid particular attention to the division of the complex into public and private areas, using low walls to divide the Park Service service area from the central zone, and setting the inward-facing residential areas at a distance. Pedestrian circulation paths are used as defining organizing elements.

The original landscape design used non-native plants that required regular watering. Removal of irrigation caused these plants to die, altering the landscape.

The complex was listed on the National Register of Historic Places in 2005, and was designated a National Historic Landmark District in 2016.

== See also ==
- List of National Historic Landmarks in Arizona
- National Register of Historic Places listings in Apache County, Arizona
- National Register of Historic Places listings in Petrified Forest National Park
