= Chinle Franciscan Mission Historic District =

Historic district in Arizona, United States

- U.S. National Register of Historic Places
- U.S. Historic district
- The Chinle Mission Compound, ca. 1920s

- Location within Arizona Location within the United States
- Location: Indian Service Rte 7, across road and SW of the Chinle Judicial complex and Police Station, Chinle, Arizona
- Coordinates: 36.15429°N 109.56128°W
- Area: 2.92 acres (1.18 ha)
- Built: 1905
- Architect: Weber, Fr. Anselm; et.al.
- NRHP reference No.: 07000506
- Added to NRHP: June 5, 2007

The Chinle Franciscan Mission Historic District is located in Chinle, Arizona, one of the population centers on the Navajo Nation. It is on the west side of the main east–west route through Chinle, Indian Service Route 7. The 2.92-acre site is approximately 2 miles west of Canyon de Chelly National Monument, and is the core of a larger 160-acre parcel which is in held in trust by the U.S. Federal Government for the Navajos. It was originally set aside for the Franciscan Friars in 1903, and is now leased by the Roman Catholic Church, through the Diocese of Gallup, New Mexico. It includes the Our Lady of Fatima Church. The entirety of the historic district is defined by three historic buildings, one historic object and one historic site. The buildings were constructed between 1905 and 1925 and are the Friary, the Annunciation Mission Church, and the Workshop/Garage; the object is the church bell, which was cast in 1914; and the site is the church's cemetery, which was active between 1907 and 1935. The district is made up of two discontiguous parcels. The first parcel is 2.2 acres and contains the Friary, Church, Garage and Bell, while the second parcel is .72 acres and contains the cemetery.

== History ==
The National Park Service has determined that the historical period for this district lasted from 1905 through 1956. In 1898 the Franciscan order established a presence in Navajo territory with the establishment of a church and mission at St. Michaels, Arizona. The Chinle Mission was the first outreach mission, established from St. Michaels. After St. Michaels was established, it was decided that Chinle would be the location of the next mission. Father Leopold Ostermann was sent to select in a prospective building site in 1902. Upon his arrival, the only permanent structures in the area were two trading posts: Garcia's Trading Post, and Sam E. Day's trading post at the mouth of Canyon de Chelly. In April 1903, the Navajos agreed to a proposal by the Franciscan order to build a church and other buildings on land which had been set aside by the Federal government. The Franciscans arrived in Chinle in 1903 when Father Leopold Ostermann held his first service on September 23. Prior to that, on June 20, 1903, the Secretary of the Interior granted authority (Land Authority 88189) for the U.S. Indian Agent of the Navajo Agency, George Hayzlett, "to set aside 160 acres of land for the temporary use and occupancy of the Roman Catholic Church for missionary and educational purposes..." Ostermann and Brother Placidus Buerger took up residence in Chinle in a rented stone building. Ostermann was nickname ’Eé’neishoodii Tsoh, the "Stout Priest," by the local Navajos.

=== Historical period ===
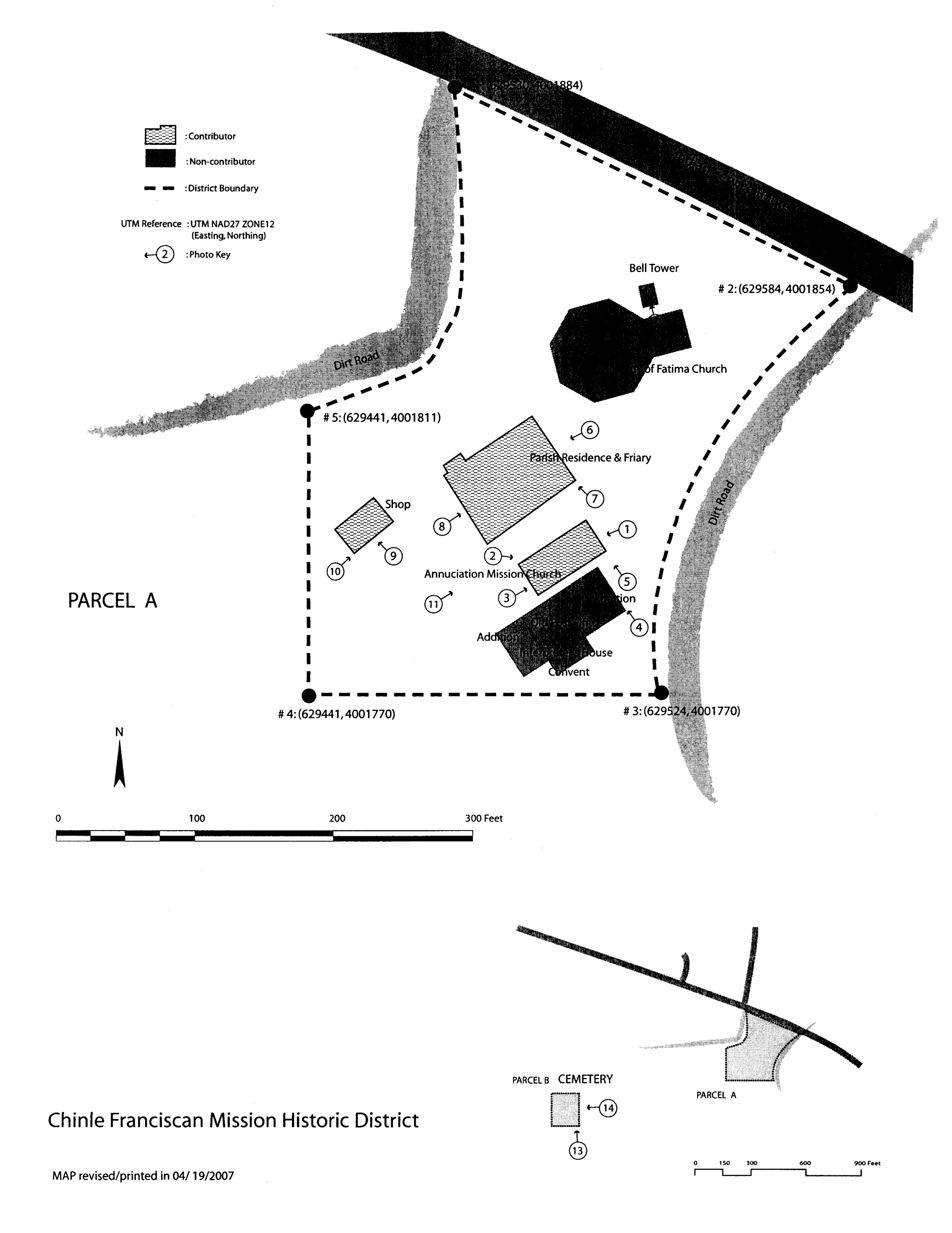
Map of the Historic District – buildings considered historic are shaded gray

The building site was selected on August 15, 1905, and ground was broken for the friary the following day. The construction of the friary was done primarily by Indians, supervised by Buerger and Ostermann. The friary was designed by Father Anselm Weber, Superior at St. Michaels Mission, and constructed in 1905, of adobe block on a sandstone block foundation. Buerger left in November due to failing health, from which he would die three months later on February 19, 1906. While not finished, Ostermann moved into the friary in January 1906. The friary was completed at some point in 1906. Also in 1906, on September 14, a well was dug reaching fifteen feet below ground, and a windmill was erected, which provided the friary's water through a tank and gravity-flow system. Called the "windmill well", it was seven feet in diameter, twenty feet deep, and it lay to the west of the friary. The well was filled in at some point during the 1940s. The first baptism on the premises occurred on September 12, 1907, which was performed by Father Leopold for Leo Arnold. And the first wedding was performed five years later, on April 27, 1912, when Father Leopold married Ethnobah Norcross and Albert G. Sandoval.

Construction was begun on the Annunciation Mission Church in 1910, along with a stone post office and interpreter's house. The mission church was the second oldest Catholic church on the Navajo reservation, and was dedicated on March 25, 1912.

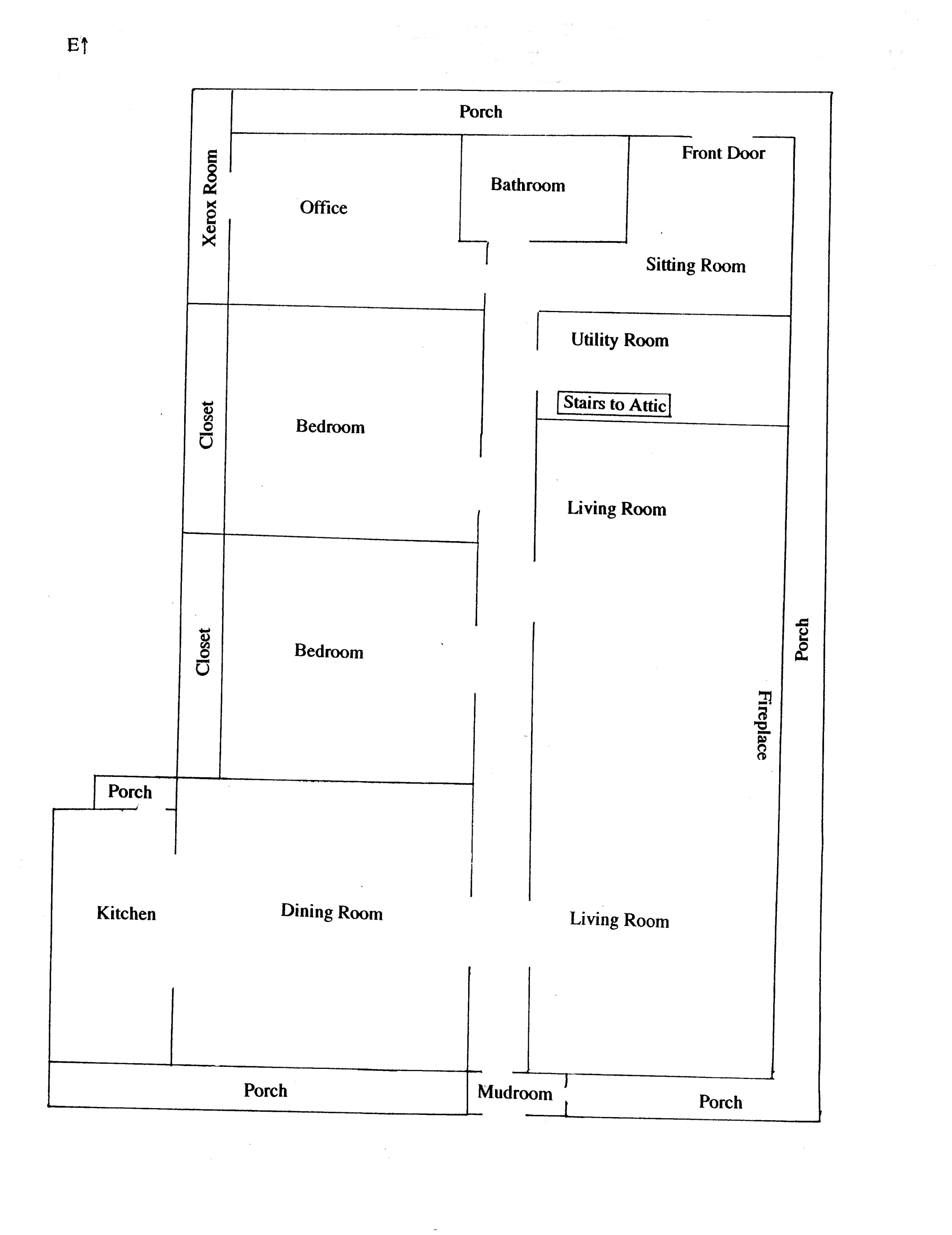
Floor plan of the friary

Weber took charge of ordering the materials for the building. While many materials were delivered to the site by horse and wagon from Gallup, New Mexico, the stone for the cellar and foundation were quarried locally. The cellar was partial, existing only below the kitchen and dining area. The cost of construction was approximately $1500. This rectangular adobe building first served a dual purpose as a chapel and Friars’ residence. In 1910 or 1911, it became solely a Friars’ Residence, which it continues to be today. The east side of the friary contained a large room consisting of the dining room and kitchen, along with a potbellied stove and chimney, as well as a smaller room which served as a parlor. The north side of the friary contained three bedrooms, as well as a room which contained the stairs to the attic. The south end of the building contained a single large room which was the chapel, which had a second potbellied stove and chimney. The chapel in the friary was only temporary, until a separate permanent structure could be built.

With the construction of the Chinle post office in 1911, Leopold was selected as the Postmaster, taking over from Charley Day, who had served as postmaster at his father's trading post.

A porch was added to the friary in 1912, which was added to over the years, finally be completed in 1940. In 1912 the cemetery was opened, with their first burial on July 7, when Mary Ayui, an infant, was interred. In 1914, the Reverend Joseph Wernke paid to have a bell cast for the mission. Known as the "St. Joseph Bell", it was cast at the Buckeye Bell Foundry in Cincinnati, Ohio. It took some time to arrive at the mission, but was installed by 1920 in the north corner of the chapel.

Leopold became ill in February 1925, causing him to only visit the mission sporadically over the next several years. Finally, in 1928 he was ordered to remain at lower altitudes, preventing him from ever returning to Chinle, which sits at an altitude of approximately 4,500 feet. On April 10, 1930, Leopold died in Roswell, New Mexico. It was in 1925 when the final of the three structures deemed historically important was constructed. It has been known by various names, such as the "Tool Shop", "Carpenter's Shop", "Ice House" and "Morgue". This was due to the various uses it has served over the years, including as a workshop or tool shop/storage area, twice as a morgue in the 1940s and 1950s, and as a classroom space for religious education one year.

In 1934 Concrete reinforcements were added to the foundation, as well as the center beam being braced, in order to stop some settling of the building which was occurring. Also in 1934, in May, interior plumbing was added and an interior bathroom was added. Two outbuildings were also upgraded or constructed in 1934. An old rabbit house was converted into a coal shed by pouring a concrete floor and reinforcing the walls, and an open garage was constructed behind the friary. In May 1935, an addition was added, acting as a dining room for the friary. Later in 1935, on November 11, the mission cemetery reached capacity. The Friars began to bury their dead in a cemetery which was near the nearby Visitors Center at Canyon de Chelly National Monument. The burials continued at the new site until the Chinle Community Cemetery was opened on March 30, 1946.

=== Modern period ===
A new cinder block church, situated northeast of the Friary, was built between August 1, 1959, and March 27, 1960. It was dedicated on March 27 in honor of Our Lady of Fátima, at which point the name was officially changed from the Annunciation Mission to Our Lady of Fatima Catholic Church. On the completion of the church, the St. Joseph Bell was moved and was set into a tower in the church and equipped with a stationary swinging bell-rocker system. Major changes were done to the interior of the Annunciation Mission in 1964, by the friar in charge, Ivo Zirkelbach. Altars were removed, as were the partitions which created the sacristy and sanctuary boundaries. Zirkelbach also tore down the open garage which sat behind the Friary.

From 1967 to 1969, renovations were undertaken: the original adobe brick chimney, which was crumbling, was removed; the front doorway was widened; and, in 1968, a dormer was added on the north side of the structure. Additional remodeling occurred from 1976 to 1978 when additional bedrooms were created by enclosing the screened porch on the north side of the building, as well as remodeling of the existing bedrooms and bathroom. The rooms upstairs were also remodeled at this time, as well as the switching of the locations of the dining room and kitchen, which were also updated. A statue of St. Francis, was installed in a small alcove next to the front door in 1980, brought in from the church in Lukachukai. Also in 1980, a mudroom by the rear entrance was also added. A fireplace was added to the south wall of the Friary's living room on December 1, 1981, with a triple walled chimney pipe.

In the late 1980s, it was decided to replace the cinderblock church constructed in 1960. The old church was torn down and a new Hogan-shaped church was constructed in 1989, with the first mass being celebrated at the Christmas Eve midnight mass on December 24, 1989. When the Annunciation Mission cemetery was refurbished in 1999, it was ringed by a new fence, and the cross from the old cinder block church was used as the central cross.

== Other structures ==
Within the historic district, but not meeting the governmental criteria as historical buildings, are several other structures. These are Post Office/Interpreter's House, which while originally constructed during the historical period, in 1911, has since been modified with front and rear additions, hiding the original design of the house. If the additions are ever removed, the building might be able to be returned to its historic state, at which time it might be included as a historic building within the district. which obstruct a visual appreciation of the original house. Two other major buildings, but constructed after the historical period were the Our Lady of Fatima Church and the Bell Tower.

Other buildings include a Hogan which was brought in from Manuelito, New Mexico, as well as a church hall which lie southwest of the Friary. Southeast of the church hall is a thrift shop which has been established by remodeling an old chicken coop. The administration offices of the church are housed in a mobile modular building, as well as several other modular buildings south of the thrift shop.

== See also ==
- National Register of Historic Places listings in Apache County, Arizona
