= St. Johns, Arizona =

City in Arizona, United States

- City
- City of St. Johns
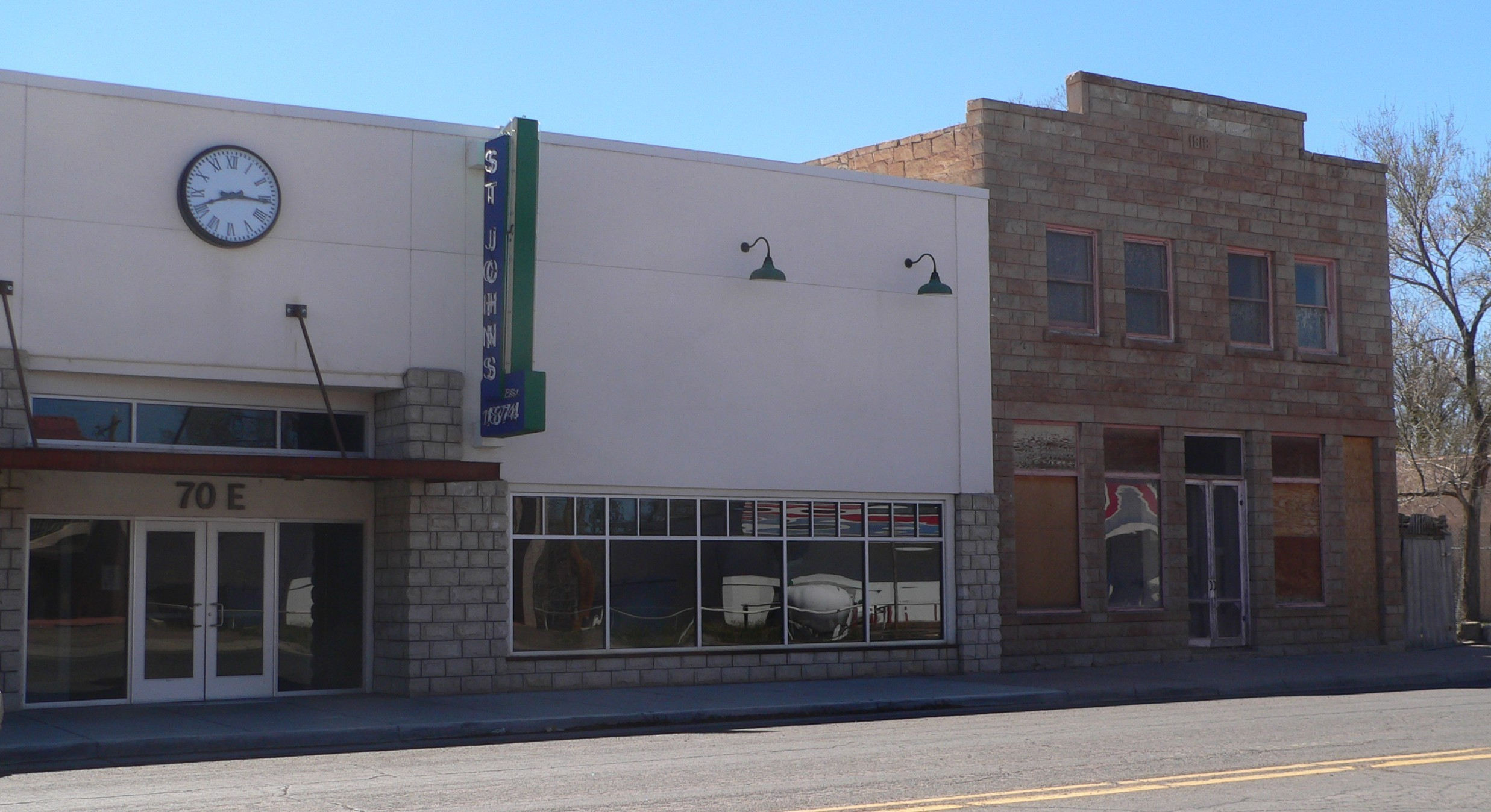
- Downtown St. Johns

- Flag
- Motto: Town of Friendly Neighbors

- Location of St. Johns in Arizona St. Johns, Arizona (the United States)
- Coordinates: 34°30′07″N 109°22′42″W
- Country: United States
- State: Arizona
- County: Apache
- Incorporated: 1946

Government
  - Mayor: Spence Udall

Area
  - Total: 26.09 sq mi (67.56 km^{2})
  - Land: 25.91 sq mi (67.10 km^{2})
  - Water: 0.18 sq mi (0.46 km^{2})
- Elevation: 5,745 ft (1,751 m)

Population (2020)
  - Total: 3,417
  - Density: 131.9/sq mi (50.92/km^{2})
- Time zone: UTC-07:00 (MST)
- ZIP Code: 85936
- FIPS code: 04-62350
- GNIS feature ID: 2411761
- Website: www.stjohnsaz.gov

St. Johns (Navajo: Tsézhin Deezʼáhí, pronounced [tsʰéʒìn téːzʔáhí]) is a city in and the county seat of Apache County, Arizona, United States. It is located along U.S. Route 180, mostly west of where that highway intersects with U.S. Route 191. As of the 2020 census, St. Johns had a population of 3,417.

== History ==
The location was originally called Tsézhin Deezʼáhí in Navajo, a reference to its rock formations. The site of a useful crossing of the Little Colorado River, it was later called El Vadito (Spanish for "the little crossing") by Spaniards as they first explored the area. Starting in 1864, a trader named Solomon Barth began crossing the area as he moved salt from a salt lake in Zuni territory to Prescott, Arizona. In a poker game in 1873 Barth earned enough money to purchase cattle and enough land in St. Johns to start a ranch with his brothers Nathan and Morris. He changed the name from El Vadito to San Juan. There is some controversy as to whether this was in honor of the first woman resident, Maria San Juan Baca de Padilla, or of the feast of San Juan. William R. Milligan arrived in 1866, followed by Frank Walker in 1870. By 1872 a Spanish-American agricultural community had developed. A stone cabin was erected by Juan Sedilla in 1874. Solomon Barth sold out to Mormon Ammon M. Tenney in 1875 or 1879. A Church of Jesus Christ of Latter-Day Saints community named Salem and led by David King Udall was established just north of the town under the direction of Wilford Woodruff on March 29, 1880, and then moved to higher ground by Erastus Snow on September 19 of the same year.

St. Johns has been the county seat for almost all of Apache County's history. When the county was created on February 24, 1879, Snowflake was designated the county seat. After the first election in fall 1879, county government was set up in St. Johns, though it was moved again in 1880, to Springerville; in 1882 St. Johns again became the county seat, and it has remained so ever since.

== Geography and climate ==
St. Johns is located in the White Mountains in northeast Arizona. According to the United States Census Bureau, the city has a total area of 26.1 square miles (67.6 square kilometers), of which 25.9 square miles (67.1 km^{2}) is land and 0.19 square miles (0.5 km^{2}), or 0.68%, is water.

The climate is cold semi-arid (BSk) with cold, dry winters and hot summers with relatively greater precipitation via erratic thunderstorms. Large diurnal temperature variations are typical, so that warm days are often followed by freezing nights.

Climate data for Saint Johns, Arizona
Month	Jan	Feb	Mar	Apr	May	Jun	Jul	Aug	Sep	Oct	Nov	Dec	Year
Record high °F (°C)	73 (23)	90 (32)	85 (29)	95 (35)	99 (37)	103 (39)	104 (40)	104 (40)	99 (37)	92 (33)	82 (28)	78 (26)	104 (40)
Mean daily maximum °F (°C)	48.7 (9.3)	55.0 (12.8)	61.3 (16.3)	69.6 (20.9)	78.2 (25.7)	87.9 (31.1)	89.5 (31.9)	86.9 (30.5)	81.7 (27.6)	71.3 (21.8)	58.4 (14.7)	48.9 (9.4)	69.8 (21.0)
Daily mean °F (°C)	34.1 (1.2)	39.1 (3.9)	45.2 (7.3)	51.8 (11.0)	60.5 (15.8)	69.6 (20.9)	73.8 (23.2)	71.7 (22.1)	65.6 (18.7)	54.5 (12.5)	42.3 (5.7)	34.0 (1.1)	53.5 (11.9)
Mean daily minimum °F (°C)	19.5 (−6.9)	23.1 (−4.9)	29.0 (−1.7)	33.9 (1.1)	42.8 (6.0)	51.2 (10.7)	58.1 (14.5)	56.4 (13.6)	49.5 (9.7)	37.6 (3.1)	26.2 (−3.2)	19.1 (−7.2)	37.2 (2.9)
Record low °F (°C)	−29 (−34)	−13 (−25)	−7 (−22)	7 (−14)	21 (−6)	25 (−4)	38 (3)	38 (3)	23 (−5)	13 (−11)	−21 (−29)	−25 (−32)	−29 (−34)
Average precipitation inches (mm)	0.75 (19)	0.56 (14)	0.76 (19)	0.45 (11)	0.46 (12)	0.49 (12)	1.72 (44)	2.33 (59)	1.42 (36)	1.17 (30)	0.66 (17)	0.70 (18)	11.47 (291)
Average snowfall inches (cm)	4.1 (10)	1.9 (4.8)	2.6 (6.6)	1.1 (2.8)	0 (0)	0 (0)	0 (0)	0 (0)	0 (0)	0.3 (0.76)	1.6 (4.1)	3.4 (8.6)	15 (37.66)
Average precipitation days (≥ 0.01 in)	3.6	3.6	4.0	2.5	2.6	2.7	7.7	8.8	5.4	4.1	2.8	3.3	51.1
Average snowy days (≥ 0.1 in)	1.1	0.8	1.0	0.4	0	0	0	0	0	0.1	0.6	1.1	5.1
Source: NOAA

== Demographics ==
Historical population
Census	Pop.	Note	%±
1880	546		—
1890	482		−11.7%
1910	835		—
1920	1,386		66.0%
1930	1,386		0.0%
1950	1,469		—
1960	1,310		−10.8%
1970	1,320		0.8%
1980	3,368		155.2%
1990	3,294		−2.2%
2000	3,269		−0.8%
2010	3,480		6.5%
2020	3,417		−1.8%
U.S. Decennial Census

=== Racial and ethnic composition ===
Racial Composition
Race (NH = Non-Hispanic)	% 2020	% 2010	% 2000	Pop. 2020	Pop. 2010	Pop. 2000
White Alone (NH)	67.2%	67.4%	68.8%	2,296	2,344	2,248
Black Alone (NH)	0.3%	0.1%	0.2%	10	4	7
Native American Alone (NH)	4.6%	4.7%	6.1%	158	164	201
Asian Alone (NH)	0.4%	0.2%	0.3%	12	8	9
Pacific Islander Alone (NH)	0%	0%	0%	1	1	1
Other Race Alone (NH)	0.2%	0.1%	0.2%	7	5	6
Multiracial (NH)	2.8%	2.2%	1.2%	96	75	39
Hispanic (Any race)	24.5%	25.3%	23.2%	837	879	758

=== 2020 census ===
As of the 2020 census, St. Johns had a population of 3,417. The median age was 36.7 years. 30.3% of residents were under the age of 18 and 17.6% of residents were 65 years of age or older. For every 100 females, there were 100.9 males, and for every 100 females age 18 and over, there were 99.5 males.

0.0% of residents lived in urban areas, while 100.0% lived in rural areas.

There were 1,147 households in St. Johns, of which 39.4% had children under the age of 18 living in them. Of all households, 56.4% were married-couple households, 16.0% were households with a male householder and no spouse or partner present, and 23.6% were households with a female householder and no spouse or partner present. About 20.4% of all households were made up of individuals, and 10.9% had someone living alone who was 65 years of age or older.

There were 1,349 housing units, of which 15.0% were vacant. The homeowner vacancy rate was 1.1%, and the rental vacancy rate was 8.7%.

=== 2000 census ===
As of the census of 2000, there were 3,269 people, 989 households, and 805 families residing in the city. The population density was 494.8 inhabitants per square mile (191.0 inhabitants per square kilometer). There were 1,392 housing units at an average density of 210.7 units per square mile (81.4 units/km^{2}). The racial makeup of the city was 80.5% White, 0.4% African American, 6.2% Native American, 0.3% Asian, <0.1% Pacific Islander, 9.1% from other races, and 3.5% from two or more races. Hispanic or Latino of any race were 23.2% of the population.

There were 989 households, out of which 44.3% had children under the age of 18 living with them, 66.7% were married couples living together, 10.8% had a female householder with no husband present, and 18.6% were non-families. 15.9% of all households were made up of individuals, and 6.2% had someone living alone who was 65 years of age or older. The average household size was 3.19 and the average family size was 3.55.

In the city, the age distribution of the population shows 35.5% under the age of 18, 8.4% from 18 to 24, 24.0% from 25 to 44, 21.7% from 45 to 64, and 10.4% who were 65 years of age or older. The median age was 31 years. For every 100 females, there were 101.2 males. For every 100 females age 18 and over, there were 100.1 males.

The median income for a household in the city was $35,215, and the median income for a family was $37,478. Males had a median income of $38,477 versus $24,009 for females. The per capita income for the city was $13,331. About 12.5% of families and 15.3% of the population were below the poverty line, including 18.2% of those under age 18 and 10.8% of those age 65 or over.

== Attractions ==
St. Johns is home to the Apache County Historical Society Museum and has four National Register of Historic Places:

- Isaacson Building
- Lower Zuni River Archeological District
- Lyman Lake Rock Art Site
- Rattlesnake Point Pueblo

St. Johns is near the Placerias Quarry, the site where dozens of Placerias fossils were discovered in 1930 by Charles Camp and Samuel Welles, of the University of California, Berkeley.

Saint Johns is along the shortest and most scenic route from Phoenix to Albuquerque, New Mexico. Within an hour's drive from St. Johns are Apache-Sitgreaves National Forest, Petrified Forest National Park, the Painted Desert, and Lyman Lake State Park, as well as Indian reservations such as the Navajo Nation, Fort Apache Indian Reservation, San Carlos Apache Indian Reservation, and Zuni Indian Reservation.

== Annual events ==
- Pioneer Days sponsored by the St. Johns Arizona Stake of The Church of Jesus Christ of Latter-Day Saints
- San Juan Fiesta sponsored by St. Johns Catholic Church
- Apache County Fair
- Christmas Light Parade

== Education ==
=== Primary and secondary schools ===
St. Johns is served by the St. Johns Unified School District. The city is served by Coronado Elementary School, St. Johns Middle School, and St. Johns High School. The city is home to the St. Johns Center of Northland Pioneer College.

=== Public libraries ===
The Apache County Library District has its headquarters facility and the St. Johns Public Library in St. Johns.

== Economy ==
The Salt River Project operates the Coronado Generating Station near St. John's.

== Transportation ==
BNSF Railway serves the Coronado Generating Station on its Coronado Subdivision.

== Notable people ==
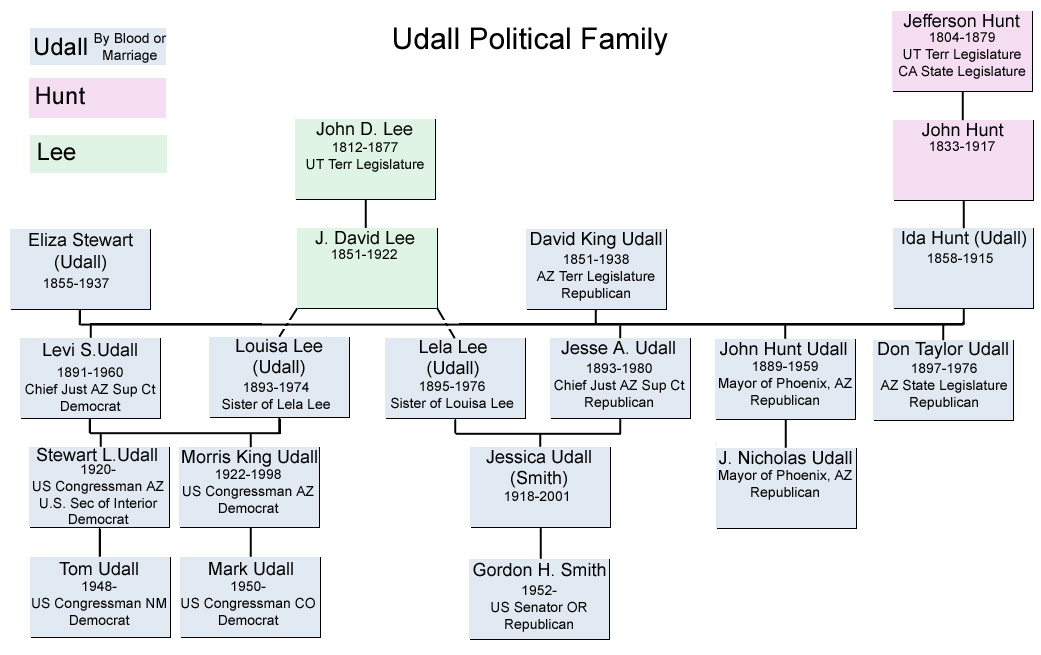
Udall family

- Albert Franklin Banta, territorial politician and newspaper editor
- Rachel Allen Berry, first woman elected to Arizona Legislature
- Jack A. Brown, Arizona state legislator and rancher
- Rex E. Lee, U.S. Solicitor General, founding Dean of BYU Law School, President of BYU
- Eric Shumway, President of BYU Hawaii
- Brady Udall, writer
- Don Taylor Udall, state legislator and judge
- David King Udall, state legislator and politician
- Ida Hunt Udall, diarist and homesteader
- Jesse Addison Udall, Chief Justice of Arizona Supreme Court
- Levi Stewart Udall, Apache County Attorney, Apache County Supreme Court Judge and Chief Justice of Arizona Supreme Court
- Morris "Mo" Udall, politician, one time candidate for President of the U.S.
- Stewart Udall, politician, U.S. Secretary of Interior

== See also ==
- The Church of Jesus Christ of Latter-day Saints in Arizona
