= Water Canyon Administrative Site =

- U.S. National Register of Historic Places
- Location within Arizona Location within the United States
- Nearest city: Springerville, Arizona
- Coordinates: 34°3′56″N 109°17′34″W
- Area: 6 acres (2.4 ha)
- Built: 1933
- Architect: USDA Forest Service
- Architectural style: Bungalow/Craftsman
- MPS: Depression-Era USDA Forest Service Administrative Complexes in Arizona MPS
- NRHP reference No.: 93000511
- Added to NRHP: June 10, 1993

Water Canyon Administrative Site, in Apache-Sitgreaves National Forest near Springerville, Arizona, United States, was built in 1933. It was listed on the National Register of Historic Places in 1993 for its architecture, which is Bungalow/Craftsman style. It was designed by architects of the United States Forest Service. It served historically as institutional housing and as government office space. The listing included four contributing buildings on 6 acres (2.4 ha).

== See also ==
- National Register of Historic Places listings in Apache County, Arizona
