= Allentown Bridge =

- U.S. National Register of Historic Places
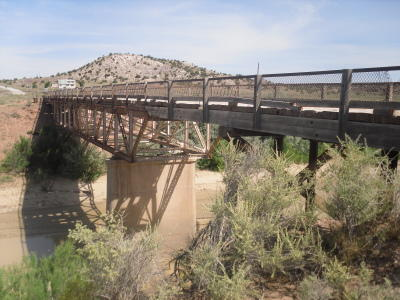
- Allentown Bridge

- Location within Arizona Location within the United States
- Location: Puerco River, Houck, Arizona
- Coordinates: 35°16′50″N 109°09′19″W
- Built: 1923
- NRHP reference No.: 88001617
- Added to NRHP: September 30, 1988

The Allentown Bridge, in Apache County, Arizona, is a bridge which, in 1988 at least, existed and spanned the Puerco River. It was listed on the National Register of Historic Places in 1988.

Midland Bridge Company has some association in its history.

As of April 2026, the bridge is still visible in satellite imagery and is standing, albeit in a somewhat dilapidated state.

== See also ==
- List of bridges on the National Register of Historic Places in Arizona
- National Register of Historic Places listings in Apache County, Arizona
