= Butterfly Lodge =

- U.S. National Register of Historic Places
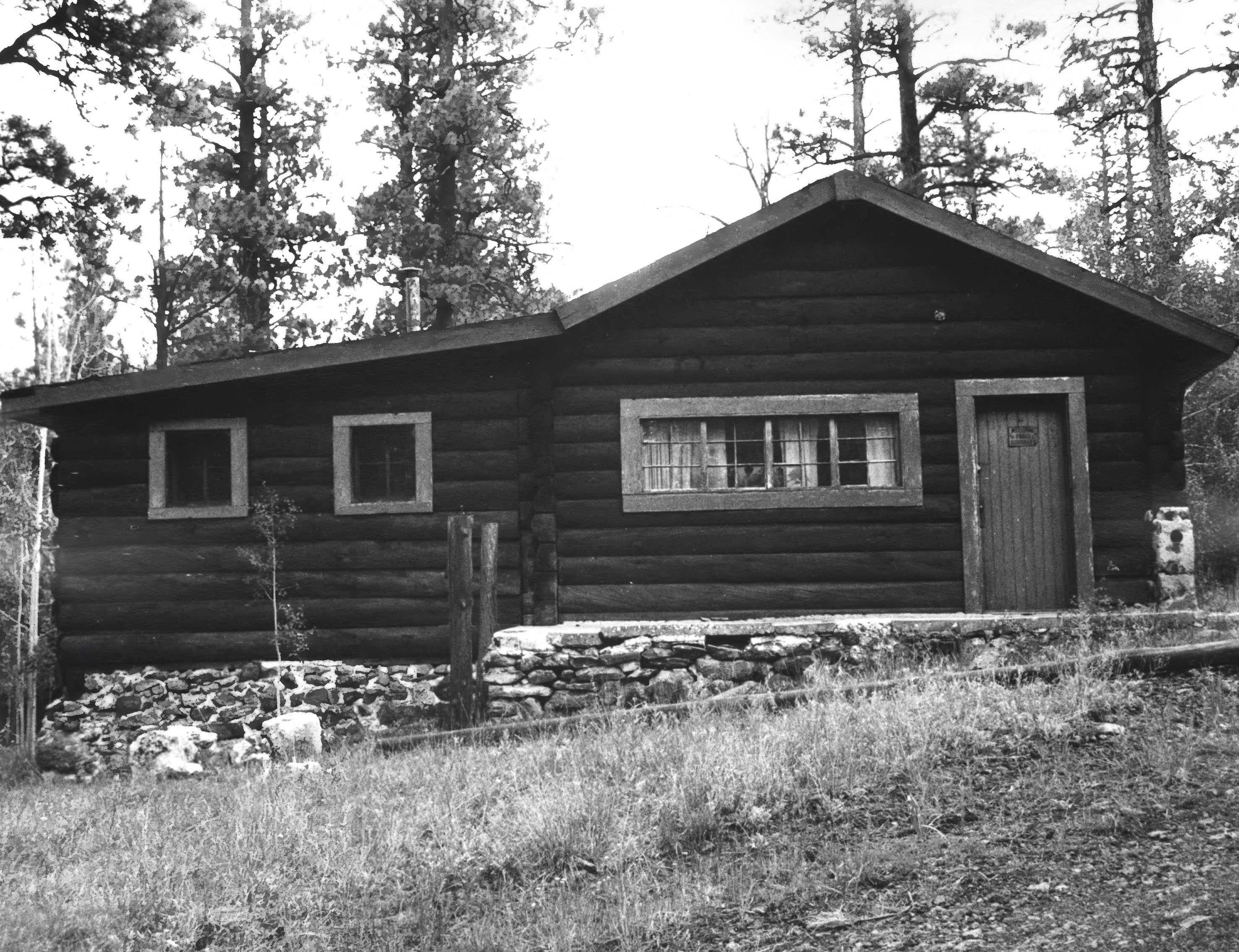
- View to the southwest

- Location within Arizona Location within the United States
- Nearest city: Greer, Arizona
- Coordinates: 34°1′8″N 109°26′57″W
- Area: 0.1 acres (0.040 ha)
- Built by: Butler, John; Wiltbank, Cleve
- Architectural style: Plank-and-slab log cabin
- NRHP reference No.: 92000686
- Added to NRHP: June 17, 1992

Butterfly Lodge is a five and half room log cabin, originally constructed as a hunting lodge in 1913 for the author, James Willard Schultz. Originally a rectangular building measuring 18 feet by 24 feet, it has been expanded over the years and now covers 40 feet, 10 inches by 32 feet, 6 inches, the shorter side being the front of the cabin. It was added to the National Register of Historic Places on June 17, 1992.

== History ==
The cabin exists in a rural area off of Forest Road (FR) 245, just to the west of its intersection with Arizona State Route 373. In 1911, the U.S. Forest Service declared the area which includes the property where Butterfly Lodge sits as a protected area. As part of a program which encouraged U.S. citizens to develop public lands, a long-term lease was issued to Schultz by the local forest ranger. Schultz financial success as a writer and explorer enabled him to build the first cabin by a non-resident in the remote White Mountains. Two men from nearby Greer, Arizona, John T. Butler and Cleve Wiltbank, built the cabin in 1913, intending to be used by James Willard Schultz as a hunting lodge and retreat. The men used ponderosa pine and Douglas fir to build the cabin. Schultz son, Hart Merriam Schultz (also known as Lone Wolf), later put additions on the structure, including an artist's studio. The site was a clearing near a spring, purported to be the headwaters of the Little Colorado River. The plethora of butterflies in the area was the impetus for the name of the cabin. Between 1916 and 1929 three additions were made to the structure, including a bedroom and storage area, an artist's studio, and a kitchen.

The exterior of the cabin has also undergone changes over the years. Initially, there was no front porch, the main entry was reached by two wooden steps. There was very minimal trim as well after its construction, and very early on there was an Indian geometric design painted on the front door, as well as the phrase "Apuni Oyis 1914" painted on the front fascia. Apuni Oyis is Blackfoot for "Butterfly Lodge". Above the apex of the front door there was an antlered deer skull mounted. The two wooden steps were replaced by a wooden porch, followed by a stone porch, with a wooden railing supported by concrete and rock tapered pylons. The modest trim was replaced very early on, with wider, more ornate trim, which exists to this day. By the end of the 1930s the deer skull was removed, and the skull of steer was placed above the windows. The natural logs lost their bark, and eventually the structure was painted brown, with the trim originally painted green, which was changed to brown later on. Currently, the railing on the porch is in a state of disrepair, as is the concrete surface of the porch.

From its initial construction through the 1920s, the house was used by Schultz primarily as a retreat and a base for hunting. However, it is likely that he did some of his writing on the premises. In the 1930s Schultz transferred ownership to his son, Lone Wolf. It was Lone Wolf's primary residence from the 1920s through the 1960s. While he did maintain a residence in Tucson, and a temporary summer shelter in Montana, the cabin near Greer was his base. The long-term lease originally given to Schultz in the 1910s expired with the death of Lone Wolf in 1970, and the property, along with the cabin, reverted to the National Forest Service. During the 1970s and 1980s, the Forest Service used the cabin to house men and equipment. In 1990 the supervisor of the Apache National Forest applied for inclusion the National Register of Historic Places. The organization, James Willard Schultz-Lone Wolf Museum, obtained the cabin and the two acres surrounding it from the Forest Service, and established the Butterfly Lodge Museum.

== Structure ==
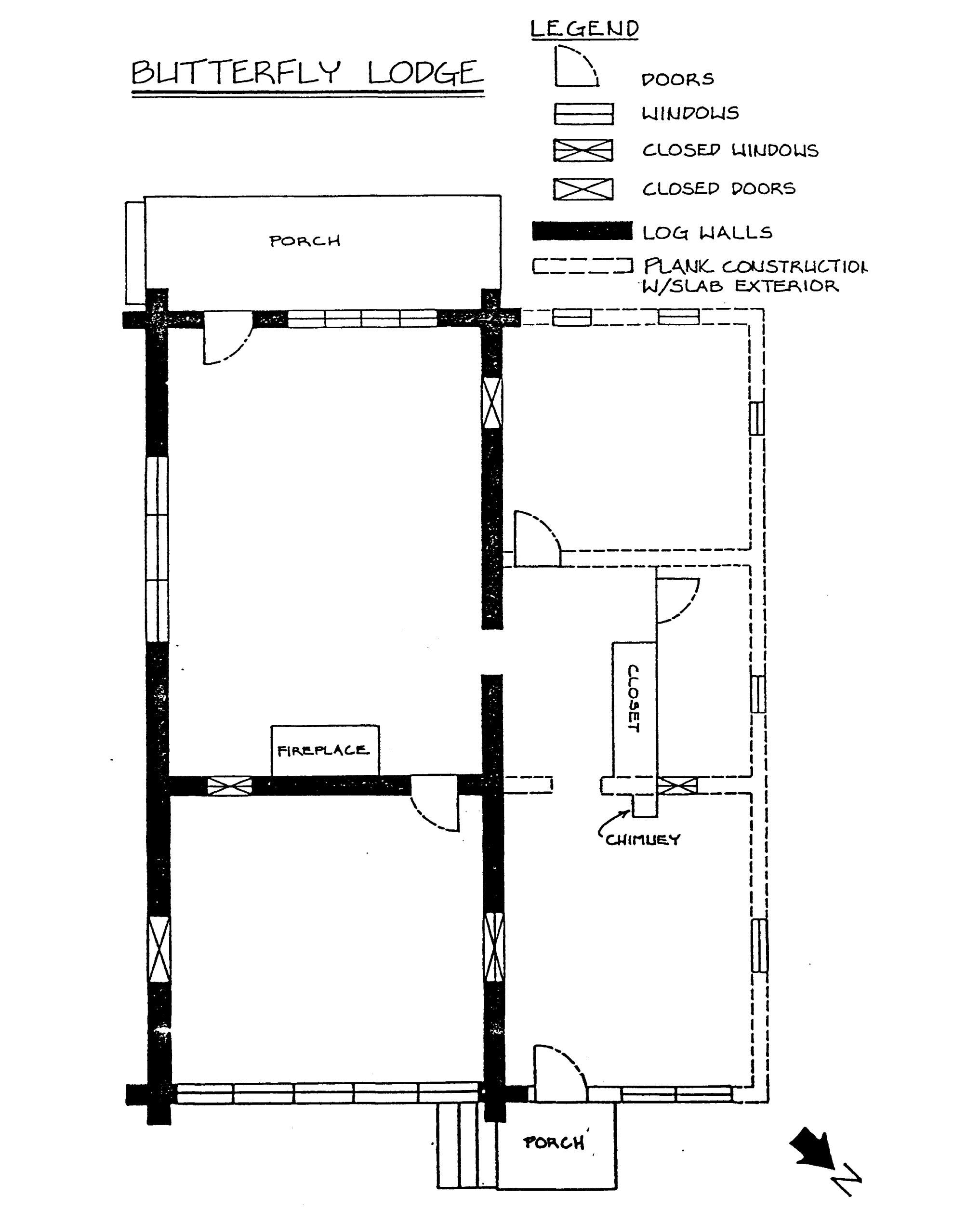
Floor plan of the Butterfly Lodge

The cabin consists of 5 and half rooms, of logs with plank and slab construction. Originally it covered 18 feet by 24 feet, but has been expanded with three additions during the 1920s and 1930s, and now covers 40 feet, 10 inches by 32 feet, 6 inches, the shorter side being the front of the cabin, which lies to the southwest of the building. There was a fireplace on the east end of the structure. The logs were hewn on three sides, leaving the bark on the fourth side to serve as exterior facing, as well as their corners having a double saddle notch in the corners of the building. The logs were procured from the Isaacson Saw Mill, which was located not far away on Benny Creek.

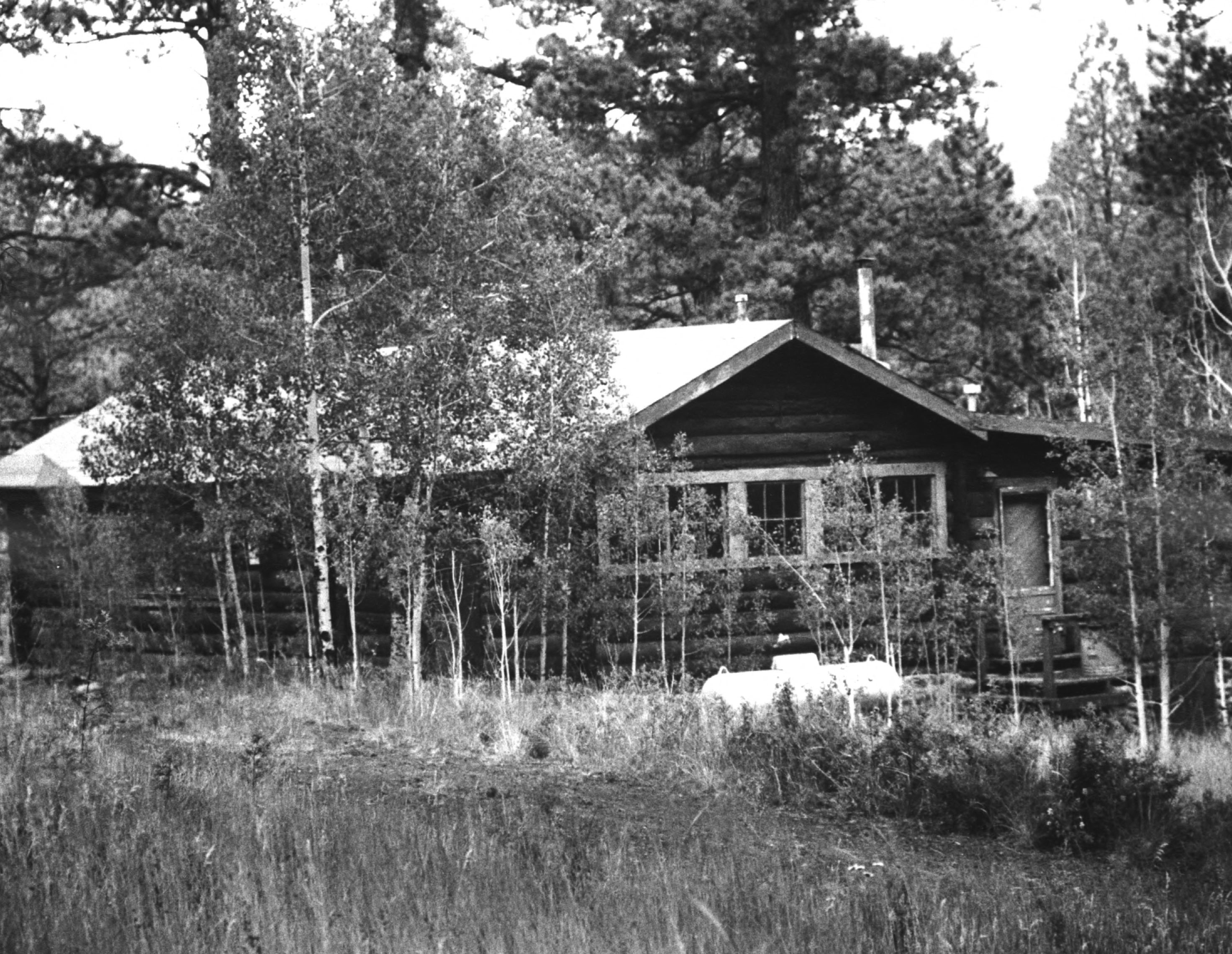
View to the Northeast

The first addition was made to the west corner in 1914, consisting of a shed-roof room, running the entire length of the cabin, and increasing the width of the cabin by 13 feet, nine inches. This addition most likely served as a bedroom and storage area. At some point during the 1920s, another room was added to the cabin, this time to east corner of the structure. However, this room did not run the full length, and thus created an "L" shape to the building, and was intended as an artist's studio. The final addition to the structure was made in 1929, in the north corner, which returned the structure to a rectangular shape. It was used as the kitchen.

The front door is located on the southwest well of the building, and is of vertical tongue and groove construction, measuring six feet, two inches tall by two feet, ten inches wide. To the west of the door are four horizontal two-over-three sash windows, each window measuring eight inches tall by ten inches wide. The gable has enclosed eaves and reaches eleven feet in height. The first addition increased the length of this side of the structure by almost fourteen feet, and includes two casement windows with two-over-two sash on this side of the building. Each of the windows is ten inches tall by eight inches wide.

The northwest side can be broken down into three sections, each corresponding to the interior room it encloses. All the sections are plank construction with slab exterior. Each of the three sections contains a window. The first window looks into the bedroom and a double hung two-over-two sash measuring ten inches high by eight inches wide. The second window looks into the bathroom, and is identical to the bedroom window. The third window, looking into the kitchen, is a two-over-two casement measuring ten inches high by fourteen inches wide.

The rear of the cabin faces northeast and contains a door and two sets of windows. Nearest the northwest corner are two windows of horizontal two-over-two sash construction, each measuring ten inches high by sixteen inches wide. Next to the windows are the door which leads into the kitchen, being 6 feet, 2 inches high by 2 feet, ten inches wide; like the front door it is also tongue and groove construction, although at a 45-degree angle. A wooden porch with three steps leads up to the door, and measures four feet, six inches wide. On the other side of the door are a sequence of five windows looking into the art studio. Each window is ten inches high by eight inches wide, and are horizontal three-over-three sash. The southeast side of the structure has door entering the art studio. There are three horizontal three-over-three sash windows which look into the original room of the cabin.

== In popular culture ==
The cabin served as the backdrop for Schultz's 1920 story, In the Great Apache Forest; The Story of a Lone Boy Scout, about a local brother and sister, the teenagers George and Hannah Crosby. The book gained international fame, especially in Europe.

The poet Henry Herbert Knibbs wrote a poem entitled "Apuni Oyis", which was included in his book, Riders of the Stars: A Book of Western Verse. The poem is a tribute to James Willard Schultz, and starts off, "There's a lodge in Arizona where the rugged pines are marching / Straight and stalwart up the hillside till they gather on the crest, / And around their feet the grasses and the purple flowers are arching / In the dim and golden glamour of the sunlight in the West."

== See also ==
- National Register of Historic Places listings in Apache County, Arizona
