= Mexican fiestas in the United States =

Many Mexican fiestas are held in the United States every year. Much of the western United States belonged to Mexico at various times and the descendants of those Mexicans carry on many of their traditional celebrations. These celebrations, called fiestas (feasts or festivals), are held on any number of religious or civic holidays. Many communities also plan local celebrations throughout the year. Most are held in the Southwest and in Texas and California (by the history of Las Californias).

Because the descendants of the original Mexicans have been Americans for several generations, many of the fiestas, especially the nonreligious ones, are a mixture of Mexican and American cultures. They may attract participants from across the whole community. The religious fiestas are generally held by the congregation of the local church but in smaller communities may involve most of the citizens.

Most fiestas offer traditional Mexican food, music and dance, and may include traditional sporting events such as a charrería, or rodeo. The participants may dress in traditional Mexican dress, especially if the event is a community wide event.

== Fiestas ==
=== Fiestas Patrias (Mexican holidays) ===
- Dieciséis de Septiembre (Mexican Independence Day); many places throughout the Southwest — September 16

=== Religious fiestas ===
- Nuestra Señora de Dolores, Feast of Our Lady of Sorrows - Friday before Good Friday
- Semana Santa, Holy Week - Easter week
- La Virgen de Guadalupe, Feast of Our Lady of Guadalupe - December 12

=== Community fiestas ===
- Charro Days Fiesta; jointson, Arizona — End of August (Celebrates the founding of Tucson—Presidio de San Agustín del Tucsón—as well as honoring the saint.)
- La Fiesta de los Vaqueros; Tucson, Arizona — last weekend in February
- The Fiesta in Santa Barbara, California
- Fiesta Mexicana in Topeka, Kansas, July, a 5-day festival
- Fiesta San Antonio; San Antonio, Texas — mid-April "Fiesta Week"
- Frontier Fiesta; Houston, Texas
- Mexican Fiesta — Milwaukee, WI — huge, 3-day summer fiesta along Lake Michigan http://www.mexicanfiesta.org

=== Other celebrations ===
- Cinco de Mayo

== See also ==
- Charro
- Cuisine of Mexico
- Fiestas Patrias (Mexico)
- List of festivals in the United States
- Music of Mexico
- Holidays and celebrations in Mexico
- Mariachi
