= Navajo, Arizona =

- Populated place
- Location within the state of Arizona Navajo (the United States)
- Coordinates: 35°07′27″N 109°32′17″W
- Country: United States
- State: Arizona
- County: Apache
- Elevation: 5,680 ft (1,730 m)
- Time zone: UTC-7 (Mountain (MST))
  - Summer (DST): UTC-7 (MST)
- Area code: 928
- FIPS code: 04-48520
- GNIS feature ID: 8525

Navajo is a populated place situated in Apache County, Arizona, United States. It has an estimated elevation of 5,676 feet (1,730 m) above sea level.
