= Chambers, Arizona =

Unincorporated community in Apache County, Arizona, United States

- Unincorporated community
- Location within Arizona Location within the United States
- Coordinates: 35°11′19″N 109°25′59″W
- Country: United States
- State: Arizona
- County: Apache
- Elevation: 5,755 ft (1,754 m)
- Time zone: UTC-7 (Mountain (MST))
- ZIP code: 86502
- Area code: 928
- GNIS feature ID: 24356

Chambers is an unincorporated community in Apache County, Arizona, United States. Chambers is located at the junction of Interstate 40 and U.S. Route 191, 45 miles (72 km) northeast of Holbrook. Chambers has a post office with ZIP code 86502.

== History ==
Chambers was named after Edward Chambers, Vice President of the Atchison, Topeka, and Santa Fe Railroad system. Chambers was responsible for opening the town's first post office in 1907.

While not named after him, Charles Chambers was responsible for setting up a small trading post in Chambers, Arizona. The name was changed to Halloysite for a period in honor of clay that was mined nearby, but changed back to Chambers on June 1, 1930.

The population of Chambers was estimated as 150 in the 1960 census.
