= Lyman Reservoir =

Lake in Apache County, Arizona

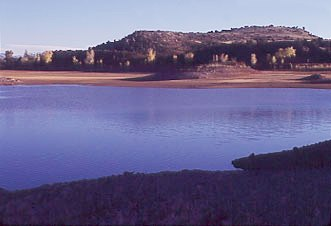

- Location within Arizona
- Location: Apache County, Arizona
- Coordinates: 34°21′30.96″N 109°21′55.04″W
- Type: Reservoir
- Basin countries: United States
- Managing agency: Grover's Hill Irrigation District
- Surface area: 1,400 acres (570 ha)
- Average depth: 22 ft (6.7 m)
- Surface elevation: 5,980 ft (1,820 m)

The Lyman Reservoir is a reservoir on the Little Colorado River located 17 miles (27 km) north of Springerville. It is the largest lake in the region. Lyman Lake State Park attracts anglers, as well as campers and water skiers year-round.

== History ==
Lyman Lake State Park was officially dedicated on July 1, 1961, making it Arizona's first recreational State Park. The run-offs from nearby Mount Baldy and Escudilla Mountain, the second and third tallest mountains in Arizona respectively, feed into Lyman Lake Reservoir.

== Description ==
An irrigation impoundment on the Little Colorado River, Lyman Reservoir consists of 1,400 acres (570 ha) situated at 5,980 feet (1,820 m). The lake lies entirely within Lyman Lake State Park. The weather is ideal in the spring, summer, and fall months with average temperatures ranging from eighty to ninety degrees. A few of many leisurely activities in the park include hiking, boating, swimming, fishing. Water levels fluctuate, but when full, the average depth is 22 feet (6.7 m), with a maximum depth of 57 feet (17 m). Lyman Reservoir is a warm water reservoir containing largemouth bass, channel catfish, crappie, carp and a few walleye.

== Amenities ==
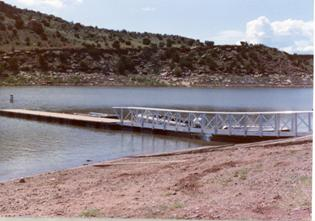
The floating dock

The State Parks and Recreation Department maintains year-round visitor amenities. Due to the vast size of Lyman Lake, there are no restrictions on boat sizes. A wide variety of watercraft are also authorized in the park such as canoes, kayaks, and jet skis. The park consists of 56 campsites.
