= Adamana, Arizona =

Unincorporated community in Arizona, U.S.

- Unincorporated community
- Location within Arizona
- Coordinates: 34°58′36″N 109°49′20″W
- Country: United States
- State: Arizona
- County: Apache
- Founded: 1896
- Elevation: 5,305 ft (1,617 m)
- Time zone: UTC-7 (MST (no DST))
- GNIS feature ID: 479

Adamana is an unincorporated community in Apache County in the northeast section of the U.S. state of Arizona. The town was settled in 1896 in what was then the Arizona Territory.

== History ==
Adamana was founded in 1896 when the railroad was extended to that point.

The town was named for Adam Hanna, a local rancher who was a distant relative of the late Mark Hanna, the original settler of the region. Originally the place was known as Adam Hanna's, as time passed and more people came to visit, the elision of a few letters gave us the name Adamana.

A post office was established at Adamana in 1896, and remained in operation until 1969.

In 1904 John Muir and his daughters, Helen and Wanda, were living at Adamana, Arizona at the Forest Hotel, a large rambling place by the railroad tracks run by a couple who gave guided tours of the Petrified Forest six miles south. From the hotel Muir would make regular trips to the Blue Forest (now Blue Mesa) making regular trips there alone or accompanied by the girls.

Adamana's population was 25 in 1920, 68 in 1940, and 30 in the 1960 census.

== Demographics ==
Historical population
Census	Pop.	Note	%±
1920	112		—
1930	180		60.7%
1940	68		−62.2%
1960	30		—
U.S. Decennial Census

Adamana first reported as the Adamana Precinct of Apache County in 1920 and again in 1930. In 1930, it reported a non-White majority (likely Native American). With the combination of all Arizona county precincts into three districts each in 1940, it did not formally appear again on the census.
