= Pueblo Grande Ruin and Irrigation Sites =

Archaeological site in Arizona

- S'edav Va'aki
- U.S. National Register of Historic Places
- U.S. National Historic Landmark District
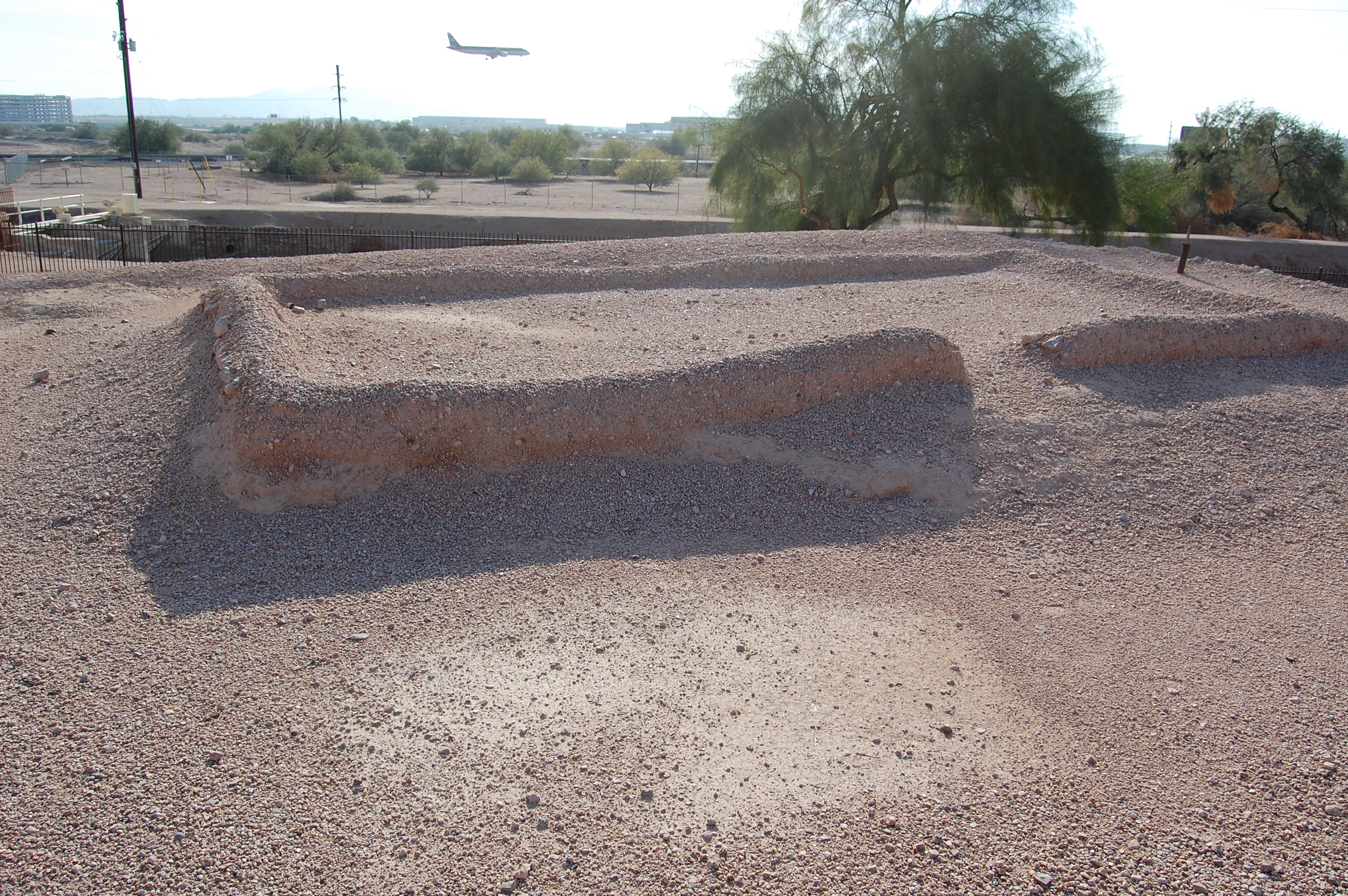
- Ruins of a building at S'edav Va'aki archaeological site.

- Location within Arizona Location within the United States
- Location: 4619 E. Washington Avenue, Phoenix, Arizona
- Coordinates: 33°26′47″N 111°59′03″W
- NRHP reference No.: 66000185 (ruin); 66000184 (irrigation sites)

Significant dates
- Added to NRHP: October 15, 1966 (ruin); October 15, 1966 (irrigation sites)
- Designated NHLD: July 19, 1964

S'edav Va'aki (pronounced /ˈsɛʔ.dɑv ˈvɑʔ.ɑ.ki/) (formerly known as Pueblo Grande) is a pre-Columbian archaeological site and National Historic Landmark located in Phoenix, Arizona. It includes a prehistoric platform mound and irrigation canals. The City of Phoenix manages these resources through the adjacent S'edav Va'aki Museum.

== History ==
Long before Euroamericans moved into the area that is now Phoenix, it was home to a thriving civilization called Huhugam by the culturally affiliated O'odham and the Hohokam by archaeologists. These Ancestral Native Americans created the archaeological structures preserved at S'edav Va'aki.

S'edav Va'aki features a large platform mound with retaining walls. This massive structure contains over 20,000 cubic meters (yards) of fill. There were also many dwellings, and at least three ball courts.

The Hohokam archaeological culture developed some of the largest and most advanced canal systems in all of pre-Columbian North America. They were the first people to practice irrigated agriculture in the region. The remnants of their irrigation canals are part of the archaeological site at S'edav Va'aki.

S'edav Va'aki was occupied from approximately AD 450 to 1450, at which time it was abandoned like many other villages throughout the Phoenix basin. The reasons why these ancestral Native Americans left their villages and irrigation systems are widely debated among archaeologists. There are many competing hypotheses that include floods, droughts, warfare, and disease.

== Notable features ==
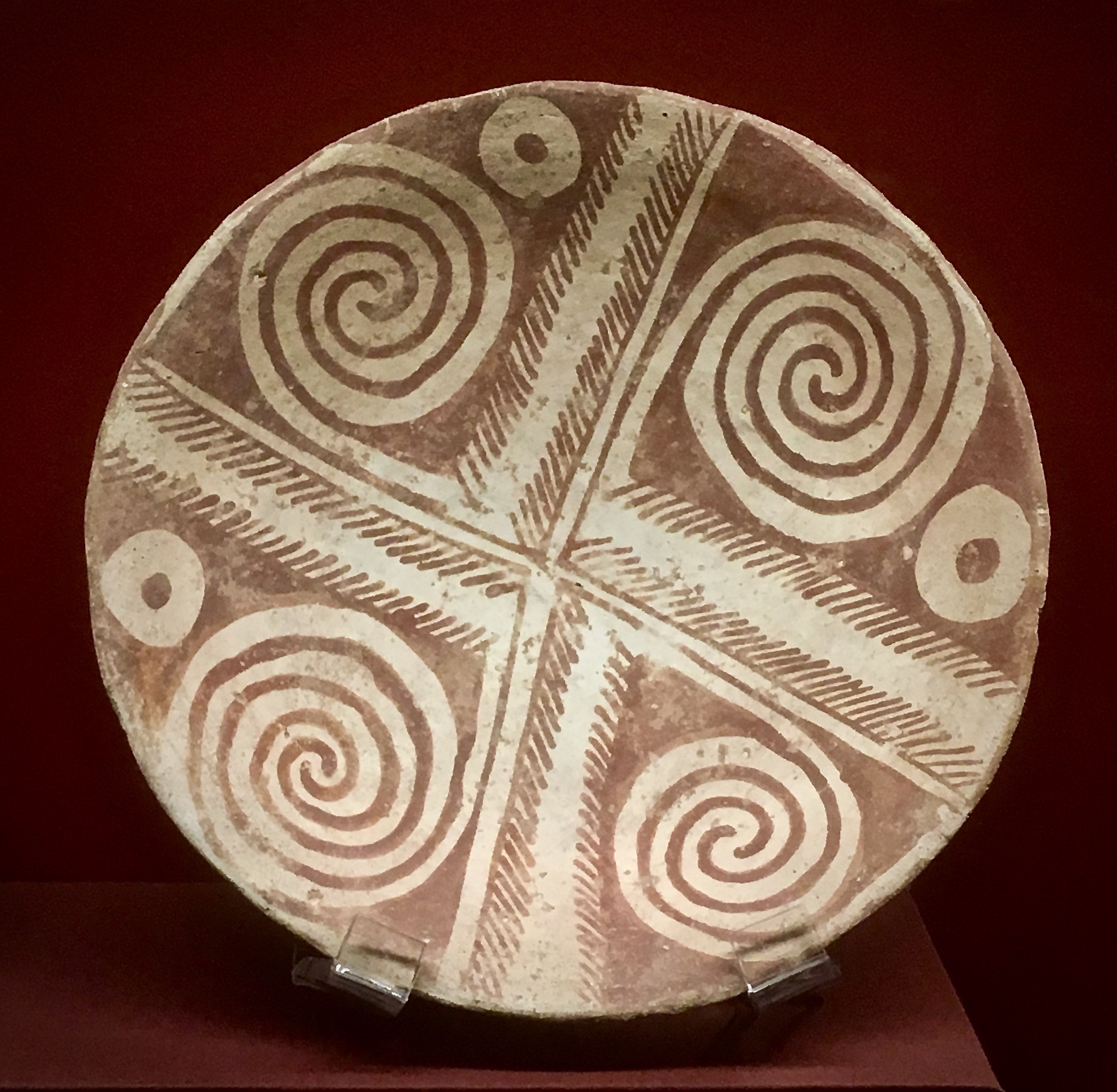
Hohokam Sacaton red-on-buff plate, c. AD 950–1150. A signature display in the Museum. The design motif is likely an unfolding Sacred Datura bud.

=== Canal system ===
Canals were built, maintained, and abandoned by the Hohokam for almost a thousand years. The site of S'edav Va'aki is situated at the headgates of multiple large canals on the north side of the Salt River. A combination of a bend in the river and a bedrock outcropping served to push river water to the surface and made this an ideal place to divert water into the canals where it was carried for long distances. The longest Hohokam canal originated near S'edav Va'aki and carried water for over 16 miles into the area of modern-day Glendale. This likely gave S'edav Va'aki a prominent role among the many Hohokam villages on the north side of the Salt River. The remains of these canals are preserved at Pueblo Grande in an area called the Park of Four Waters.

Other platform mound villages like S'edav Va'aki were built at strategic locations along the Salt River and may have been involved in controlling the flow of water to outlying villages. Complex cultural organization would have been needed to maintain all the canal systems.

=== Ballcourts ===
The site of S'edav Va'aki may have had as many as two ball courts. These were publicly accessible sites likely used for ceremonial purposes, possibly ritual ball games, and periodic markets. Ball games may have drawn large crowds to participate in market activities, facilitating regional trade. There may be cultural links between Hohokam archaeological culture ballcourts and Mesoamerican ballcourts, though, there are significant architectural differences between their design.

Some time after AD 1100, the Hohokam archaeological tradition discontinued use of their ballcourts. Many of the ballcourts were filled in with trash and platform mounds, such as the one at S'edav Va'aki became more prominent at Hohokam sites.

=== Platform mound ===
The platform mound at S'edav Va'aki began as two low circular mounds around AD 800. These were expanded over time with stone-walled cells that were filled with trash and capped with caliche plaster to create a platform upon which structures were built. The platform mound was also surrounded by a 6 to 7-foot high compound wall, which would have limited access to the mound. Some archaeologists have suggested that platform mounds were used for ceremonial purposes. The platform mound at S'edav Va'aki is one of the largest mound structures ever built by the Hohokam.

A possible astronomical observatory was built on top of the S'edav Va'aki platform mound. One room had doors that may have, at the winter and summer solstice, aligned with Hole-in-the-rock, a natural feature in the Papago Buttes to the northeast.

Archival records indicate that there was once also a "big house" at S'edav Va'aki, similar to the one at Casa Grande National Monument.

== S'edav Va'aki Museum ==
The platform mound and approximately 5 acres of surrounding land were donated to the City of Phoenix in 1924 by Thomas Armstrong. Soon after, Phoenix purchased an additional 10 acres south of the platform mound, named "Park of Four Waters", which became part of the Pueblo Grande Museum and Archaeological Park. In 1929 Odd S. Halseth was hired as both the director of Pueblo Grande and as Phoenix's City Archaeologist – the first City Archaeologist in the United States.

Pueblo Grande Museum and Archaeological Park continued to expand and was declared a National Historic Landmark in 1964. It consists of two parts, that were on adjacent properties, and both associated with the same history. They were listed separately in the National Register of Historic Places as Pueblo Grande Ruin and Hohokam-Pima Irrigation Sites on the October 15, 1966 date when all National Historic Landmark sites were administratively listed. In addition to containing exhibit galleries, the museum now functions as a repository for archaeological collections from the City of Phoenix. On March 23, 2023, the City of Phoenix changed the name of the Pueblo Grande Museum and Archaeological Park to S'edav Va'aki Museum. This more accurately represented the heritage it preserves, as “Pueblo” means town or village in Spanish and reflects a language with no connection to the people. The archaeology site itself is now referred to as S'edav Va'aki. This is the name given to the platform mound in O'Odham oral histories and can be translated as "Central Platform Mound" in English.

== Gallery ==
Historic Pueblo Grande Ruins in Phoenix, Arizona
(NRHP = National Register of Historic Places)
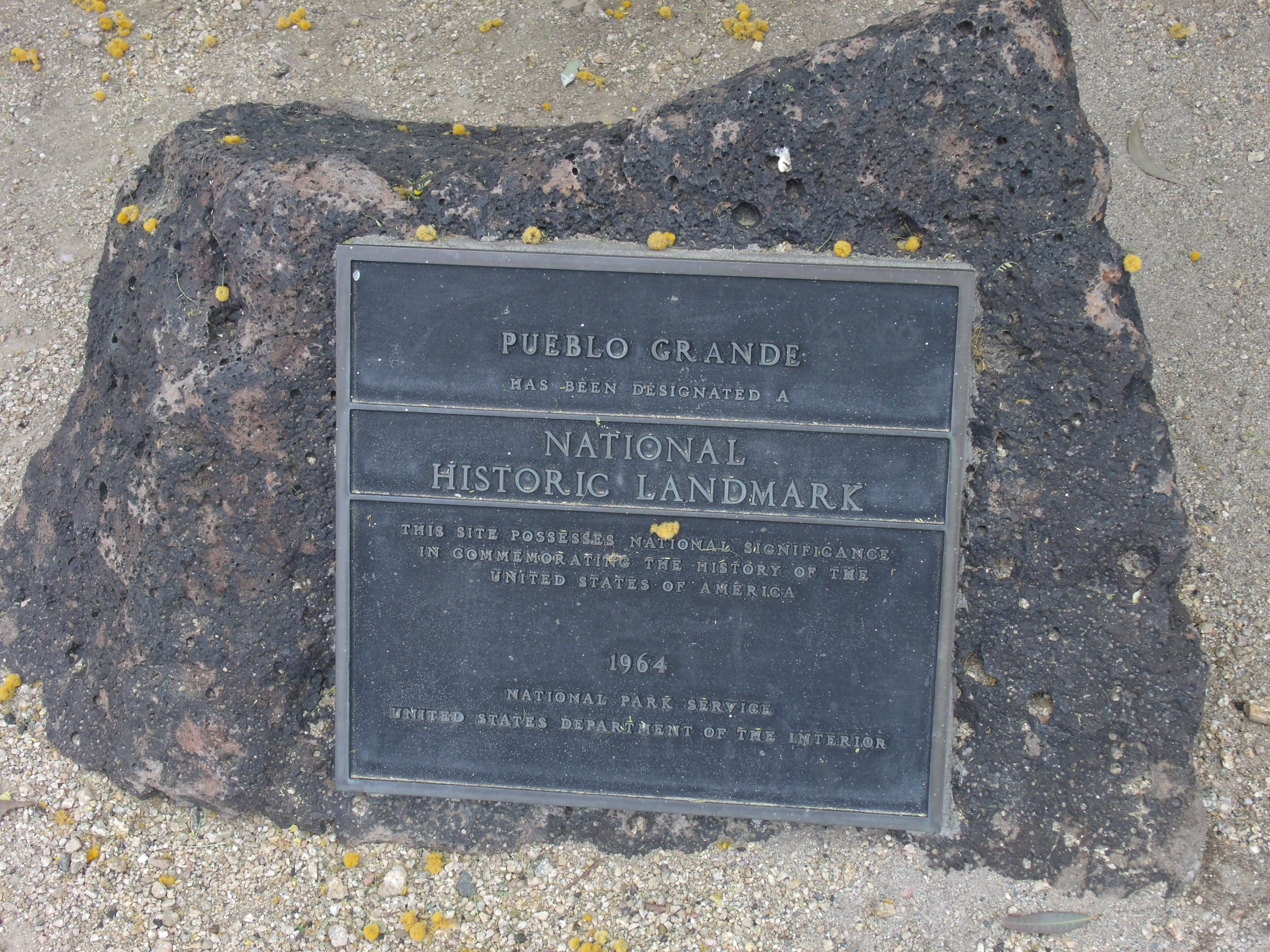
Pueblo Grande Ruin Historic Landmark Marker. Marker and contents are the work of the US Dept. of the Interior, therefore PD.

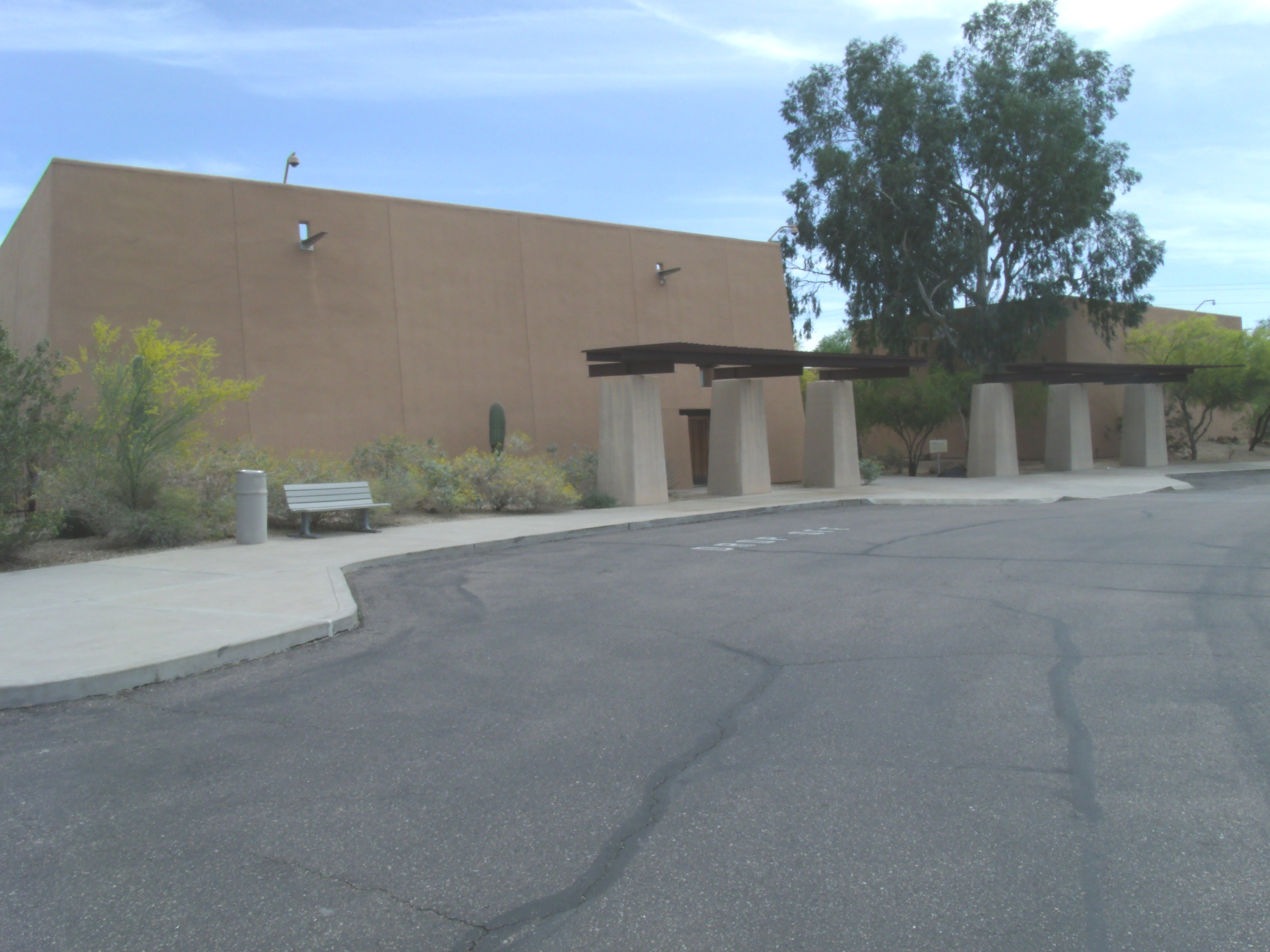
The S'edav Va'aki Museum is located at 4619 E. Washington St. in Phoenix, Arizona. The ruins are listed in the National Register of Historic Places reference #66000184.

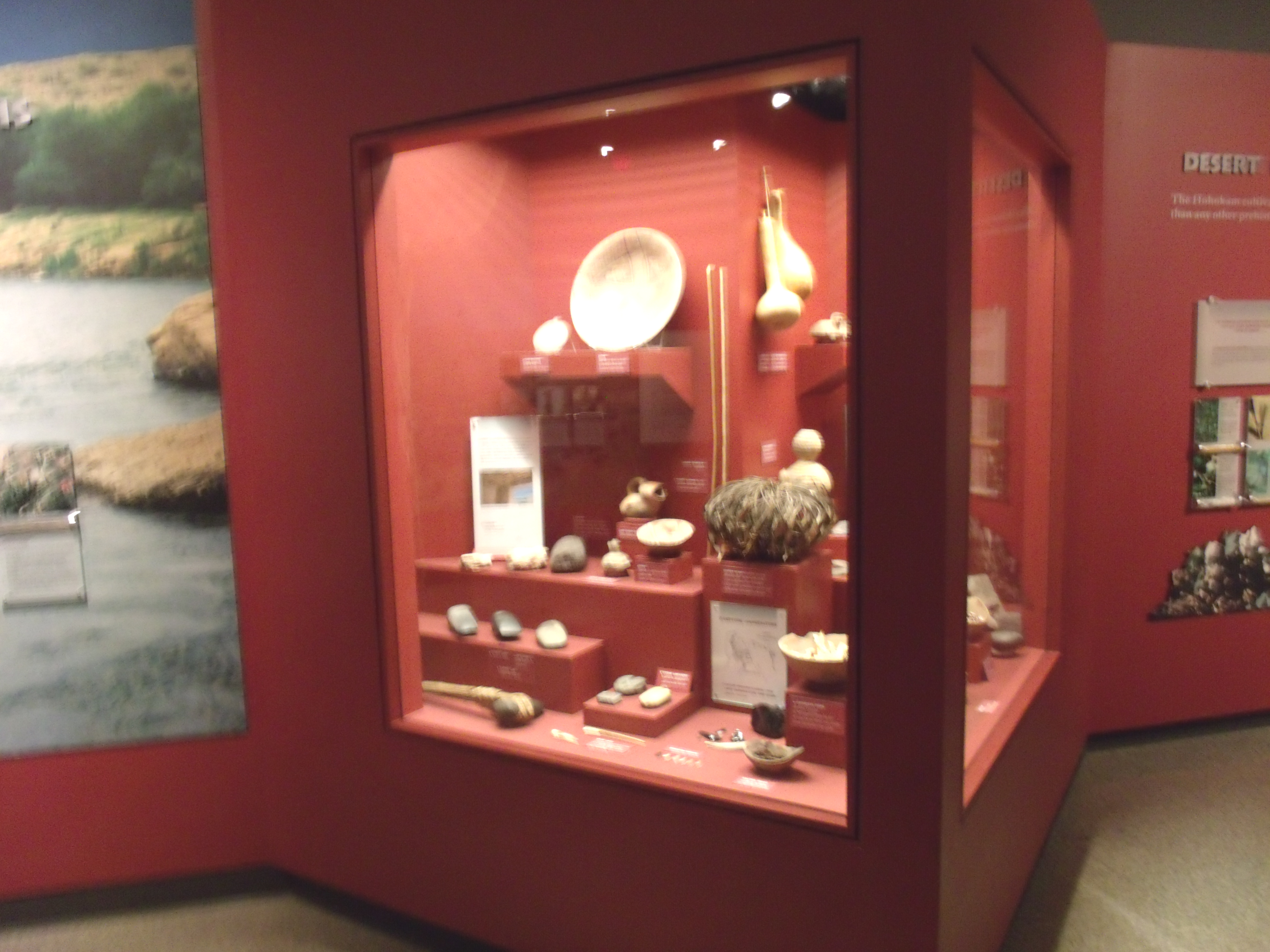
Artifacts displayed inside the S'edav Va'aki Museum

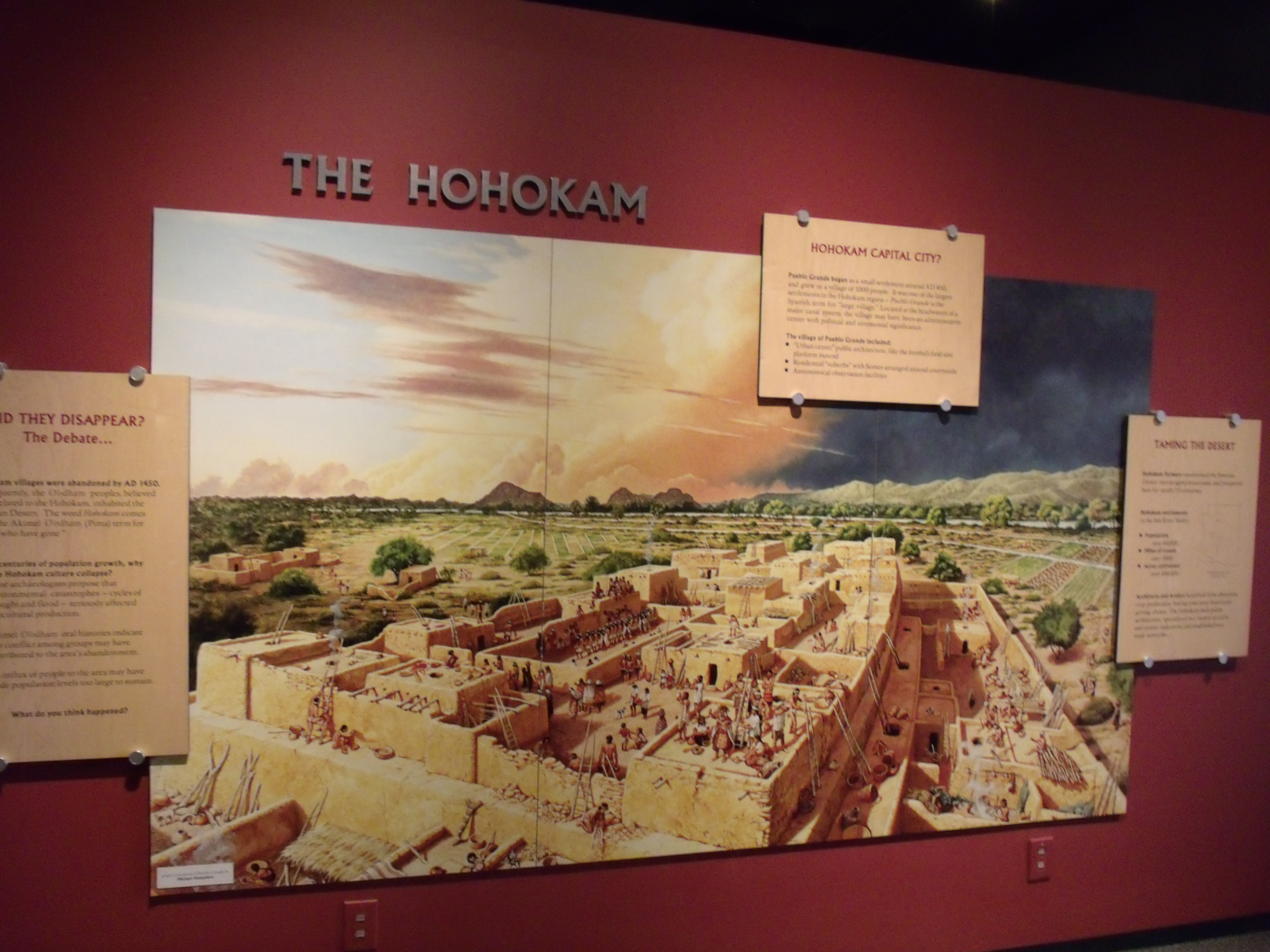
Display inside the S'edav Va'aki Museum

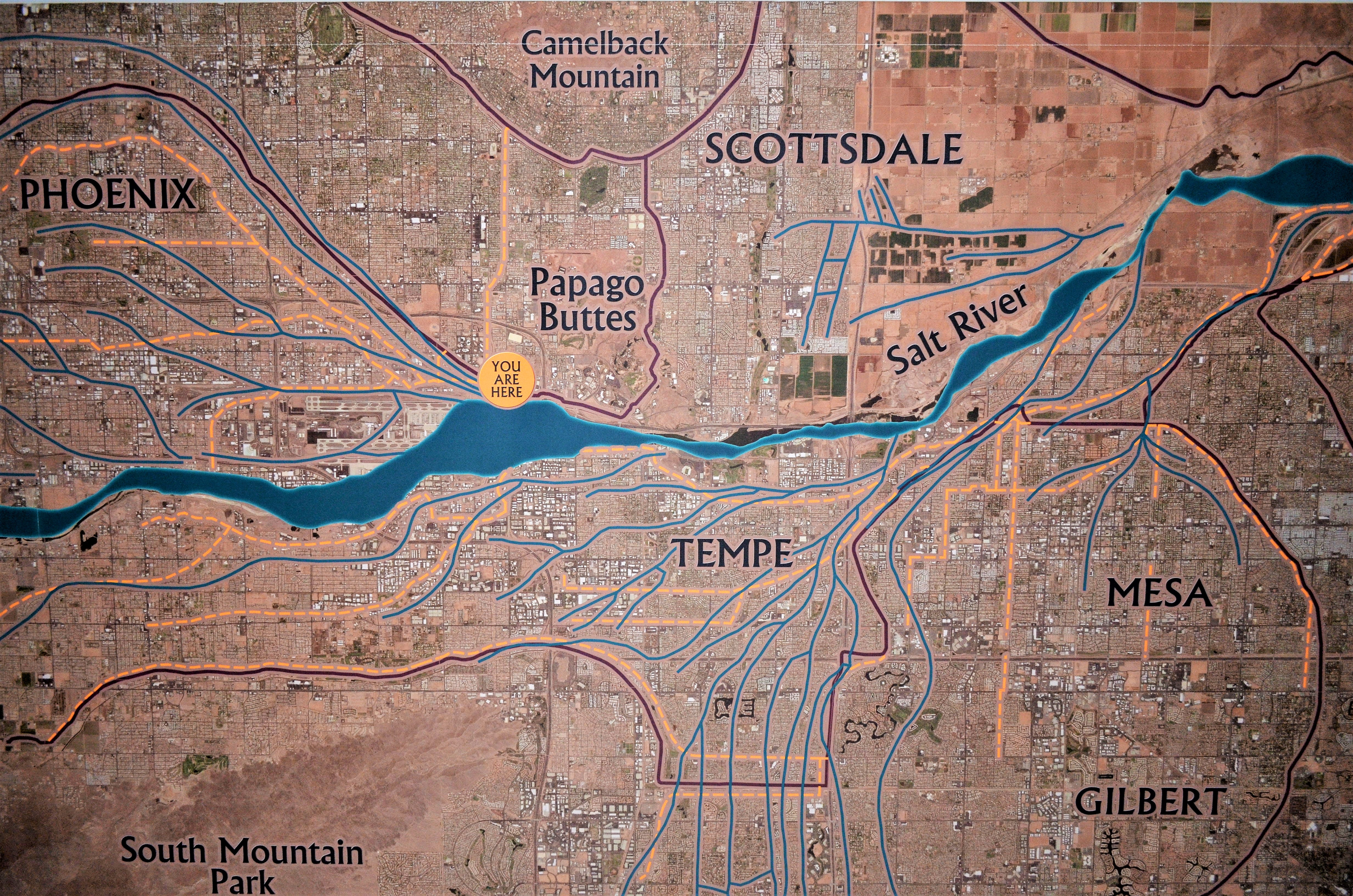
Map of Hohokam canal networks in Phoenix Metro area

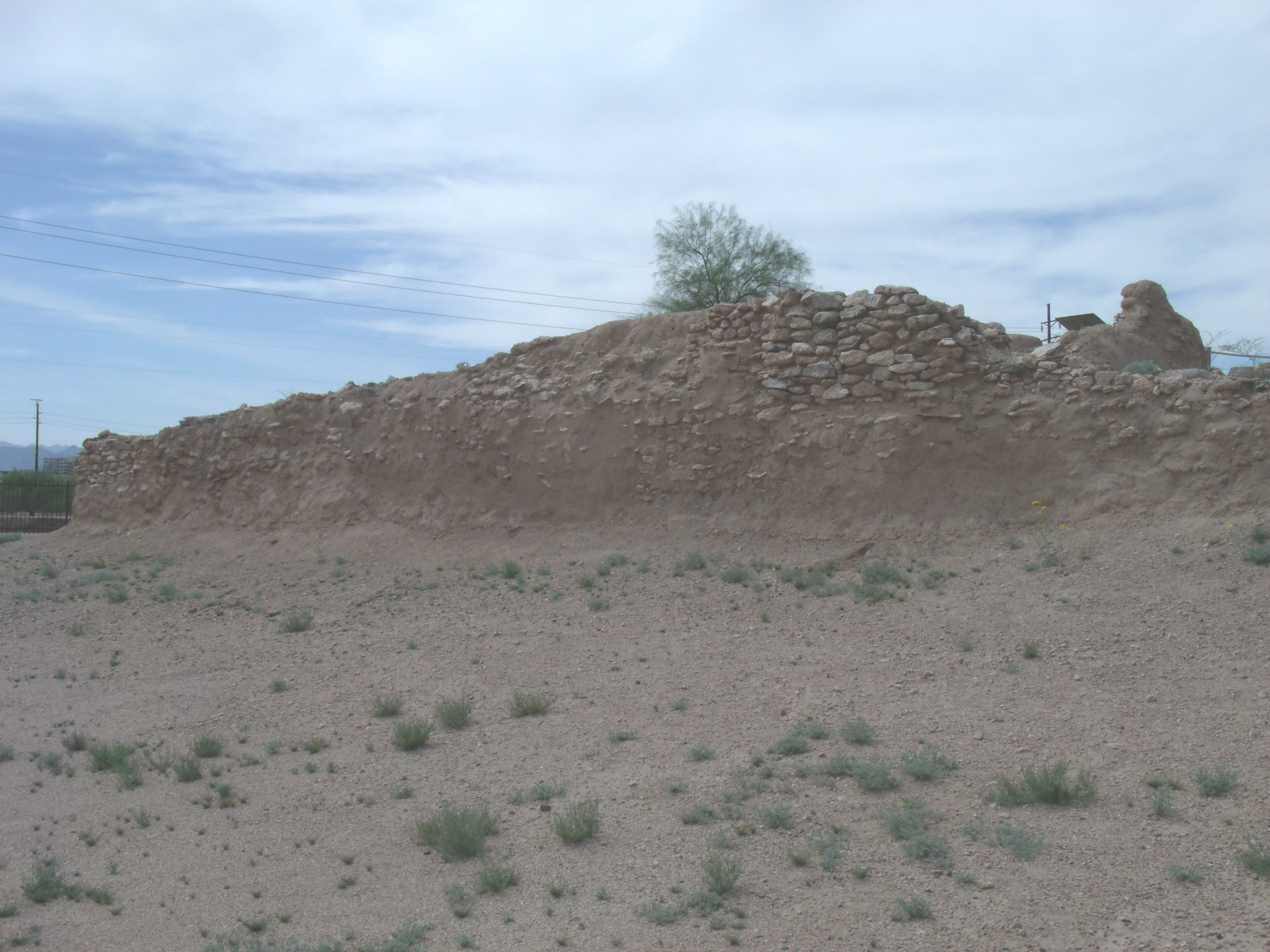
People of power and influence are believed to have lived in houses surrounded by mounds.

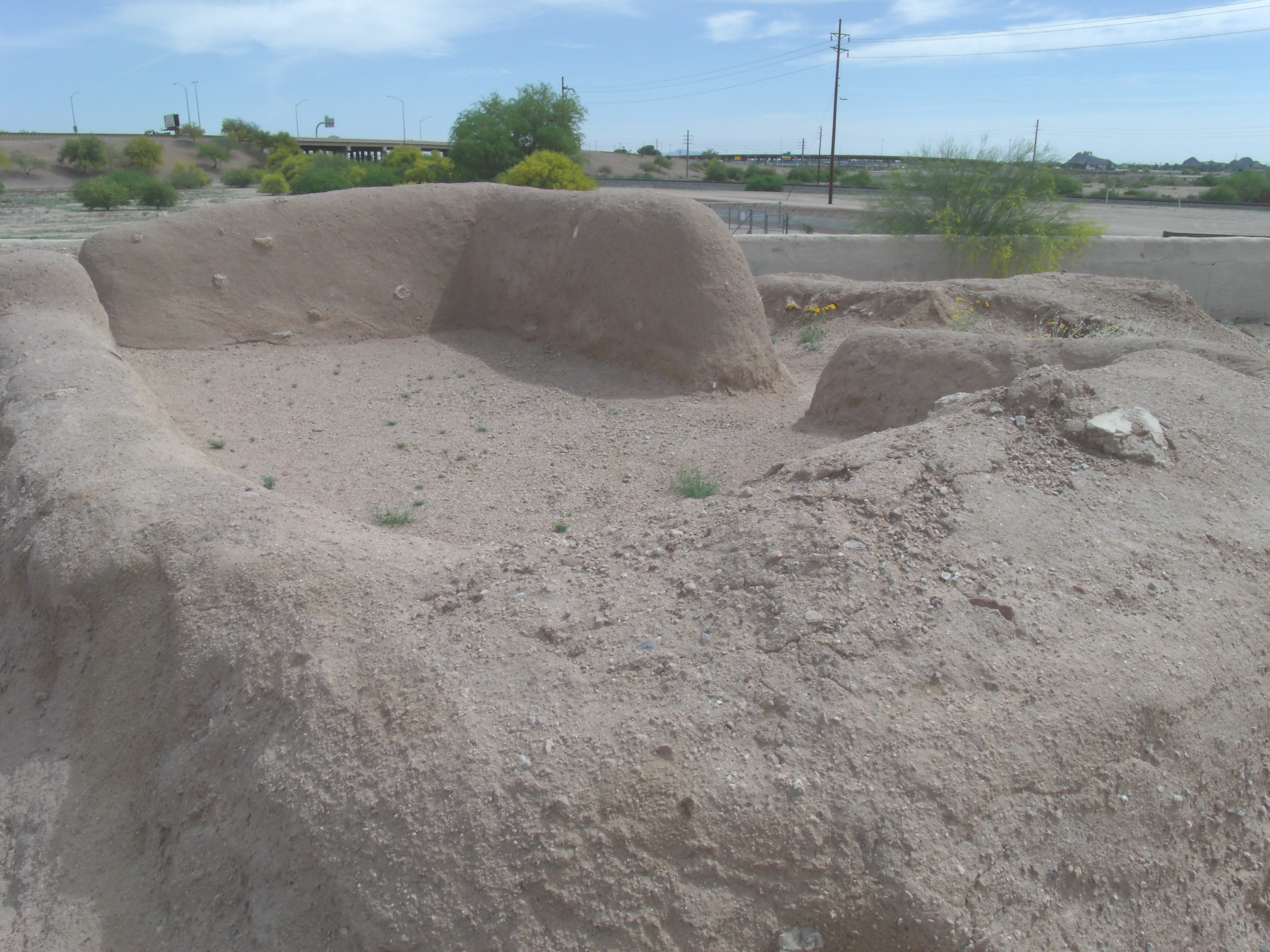
On the sunrise in the summer solstice and in the winter solstice an alignment occurs. A shaft of light stretches from one doorway to another, signaling the mid points of the solar annual cycle.

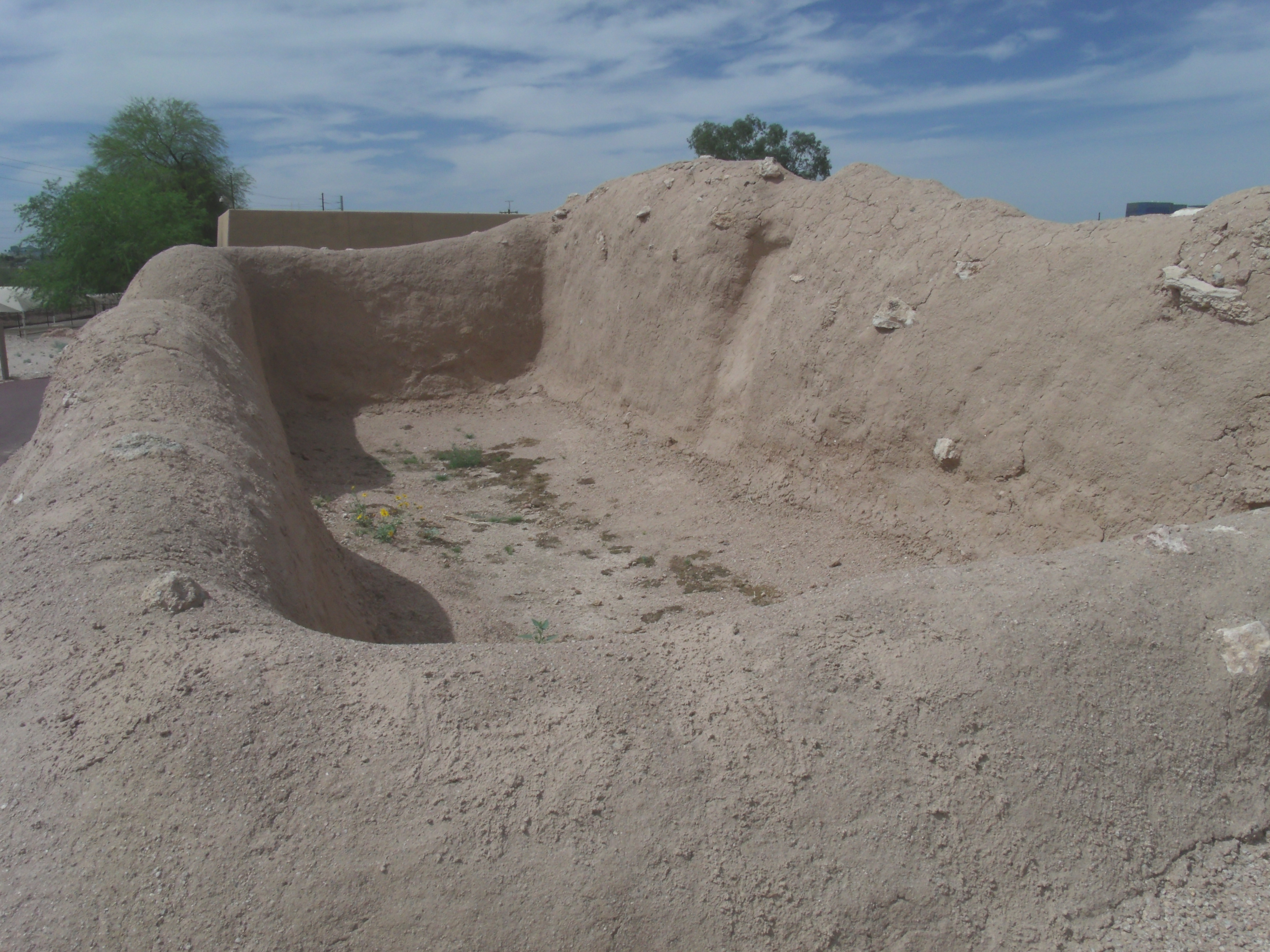
Tools and weapons were stored in these rooms.

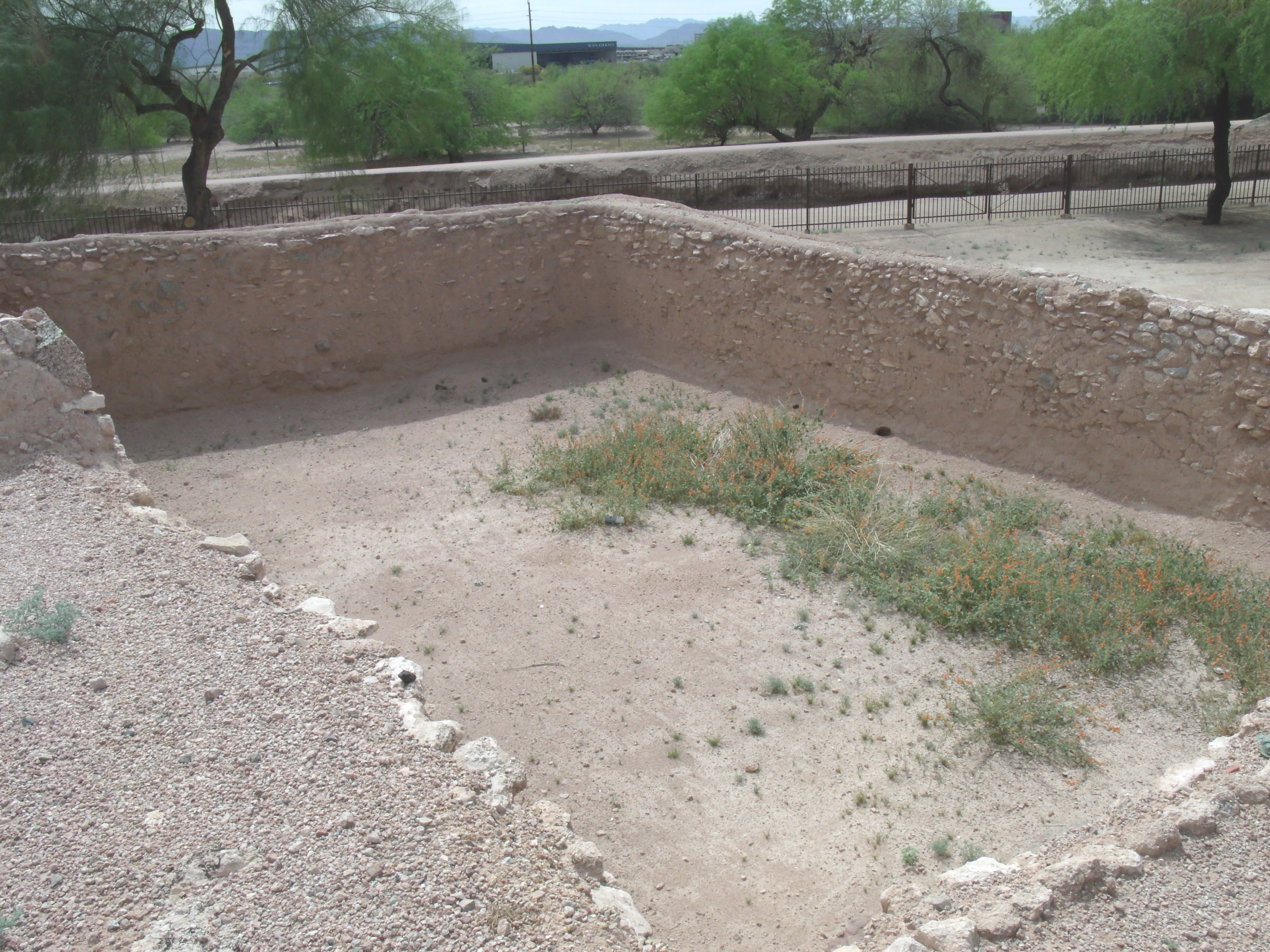
These rooms were large and had eight foot walls. Artifacts were kept in them.

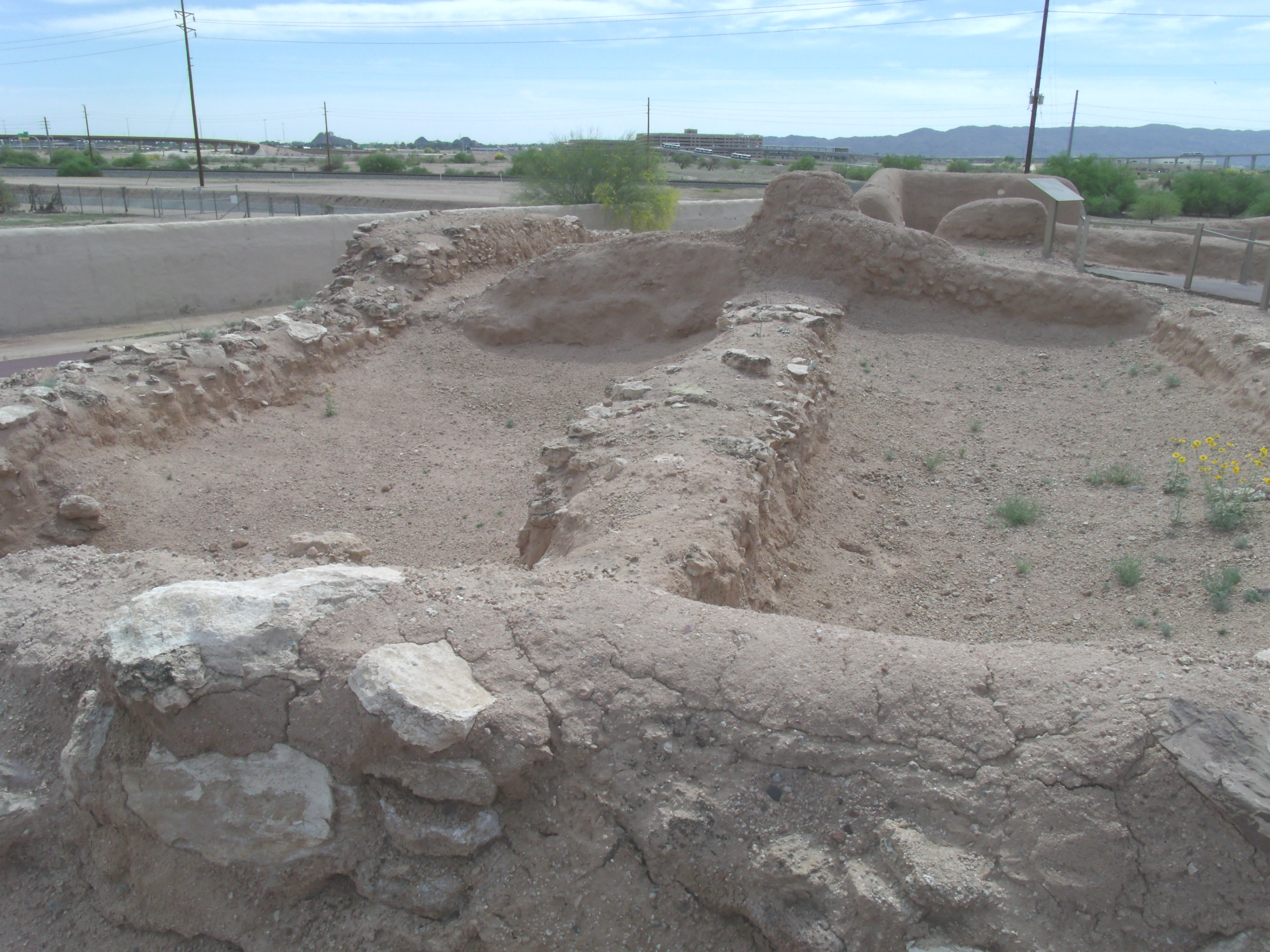
Miller's Room was named after Dr. Joshua Miller, President of Arizona Antiquarian Association, who in 1901, conducted the first excavation of S'edav Va'aki.

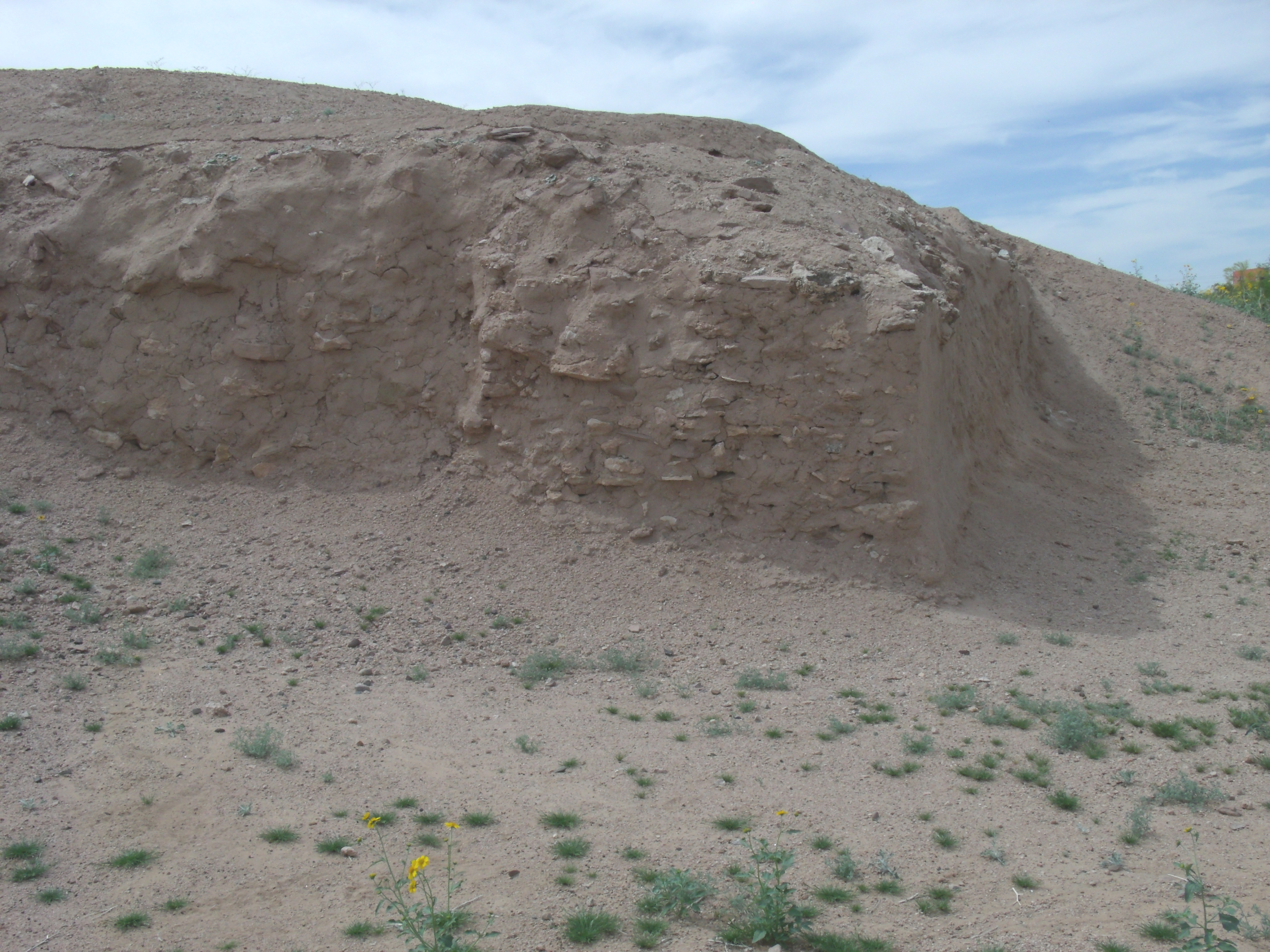
This is the largest mound in S'edav Va'aki.

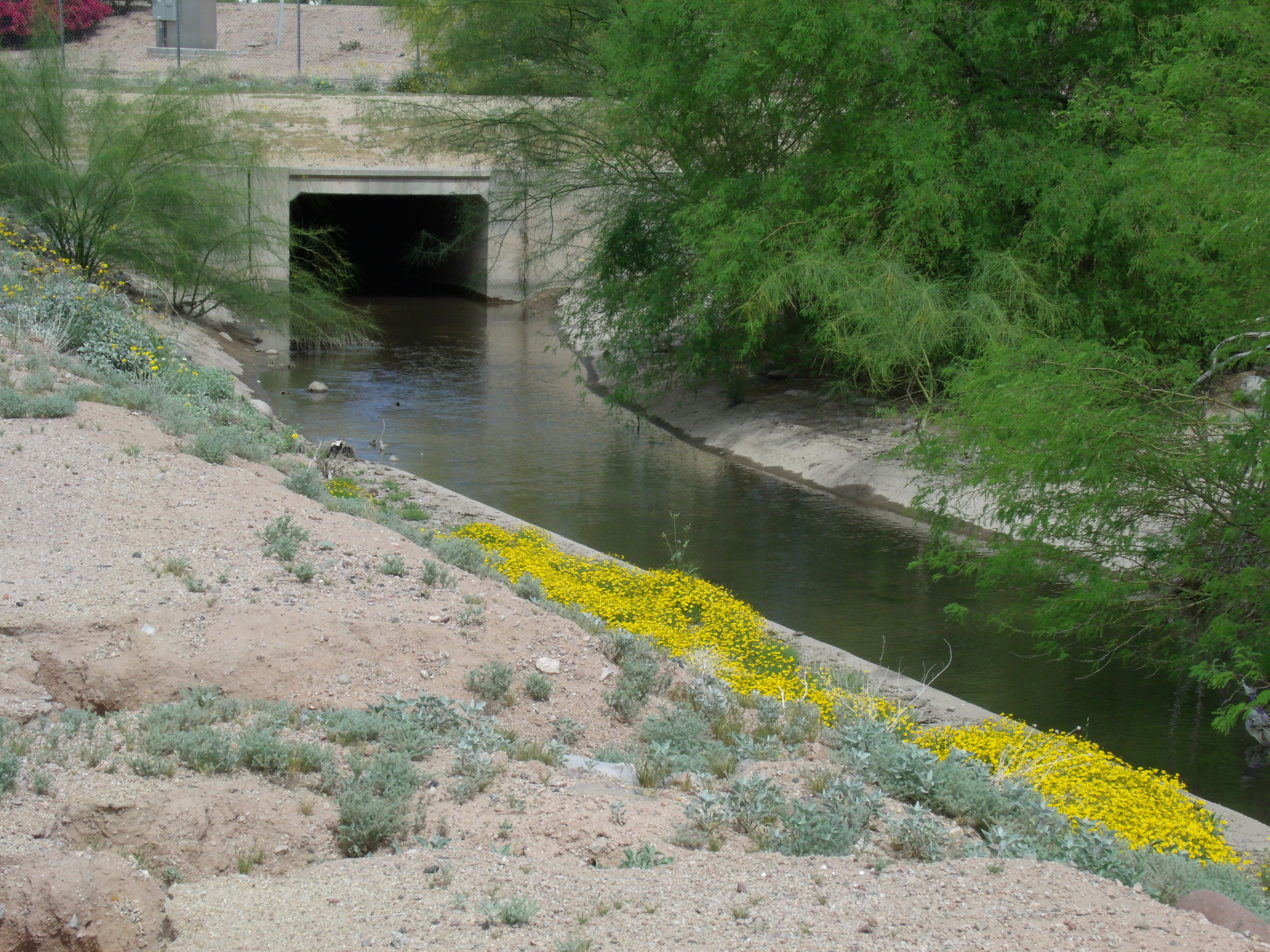
The Old Crosscut Canal was built in 1888.

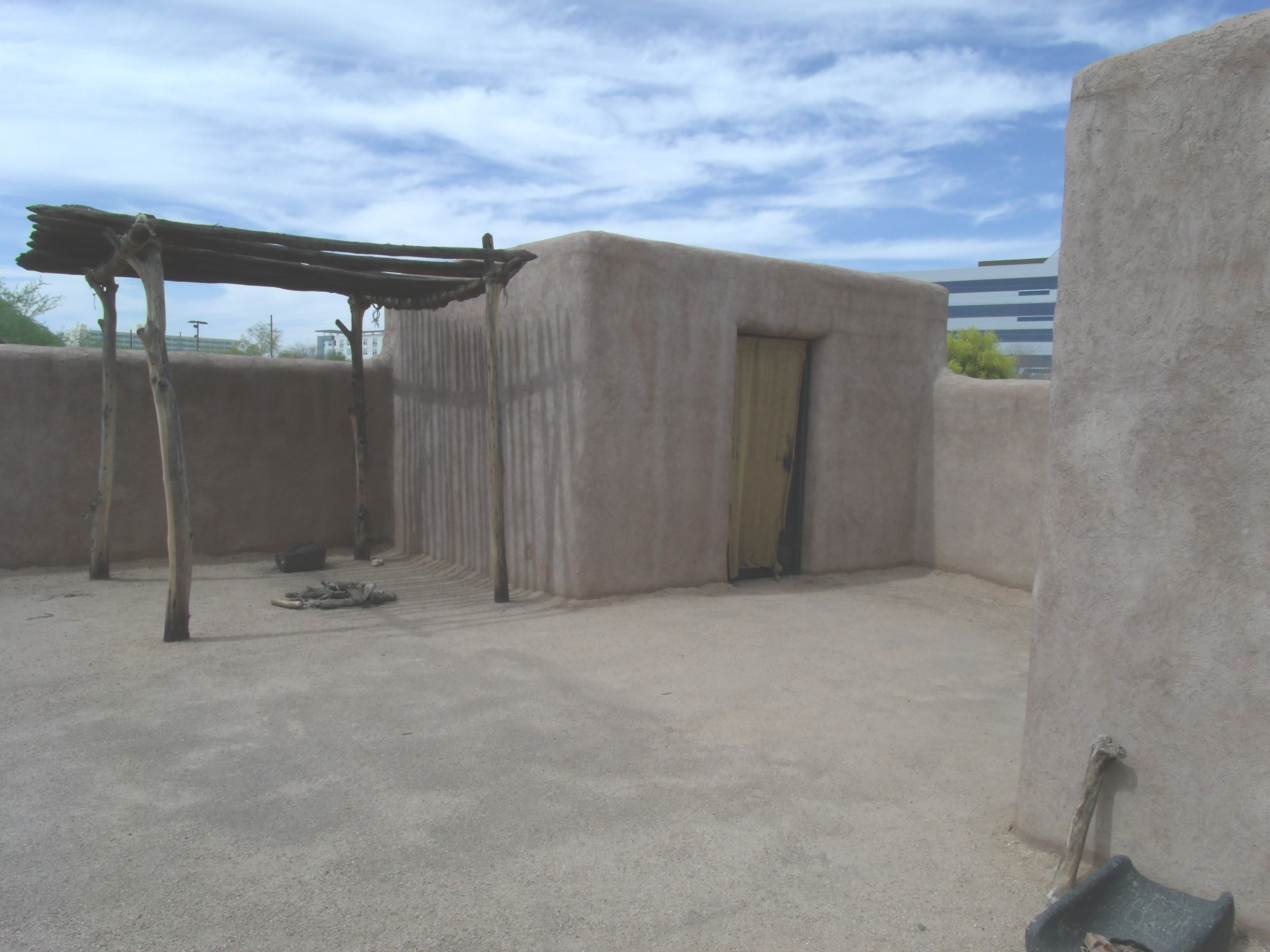
This is a representation of what a Hohokam house looked like 700 years ago.

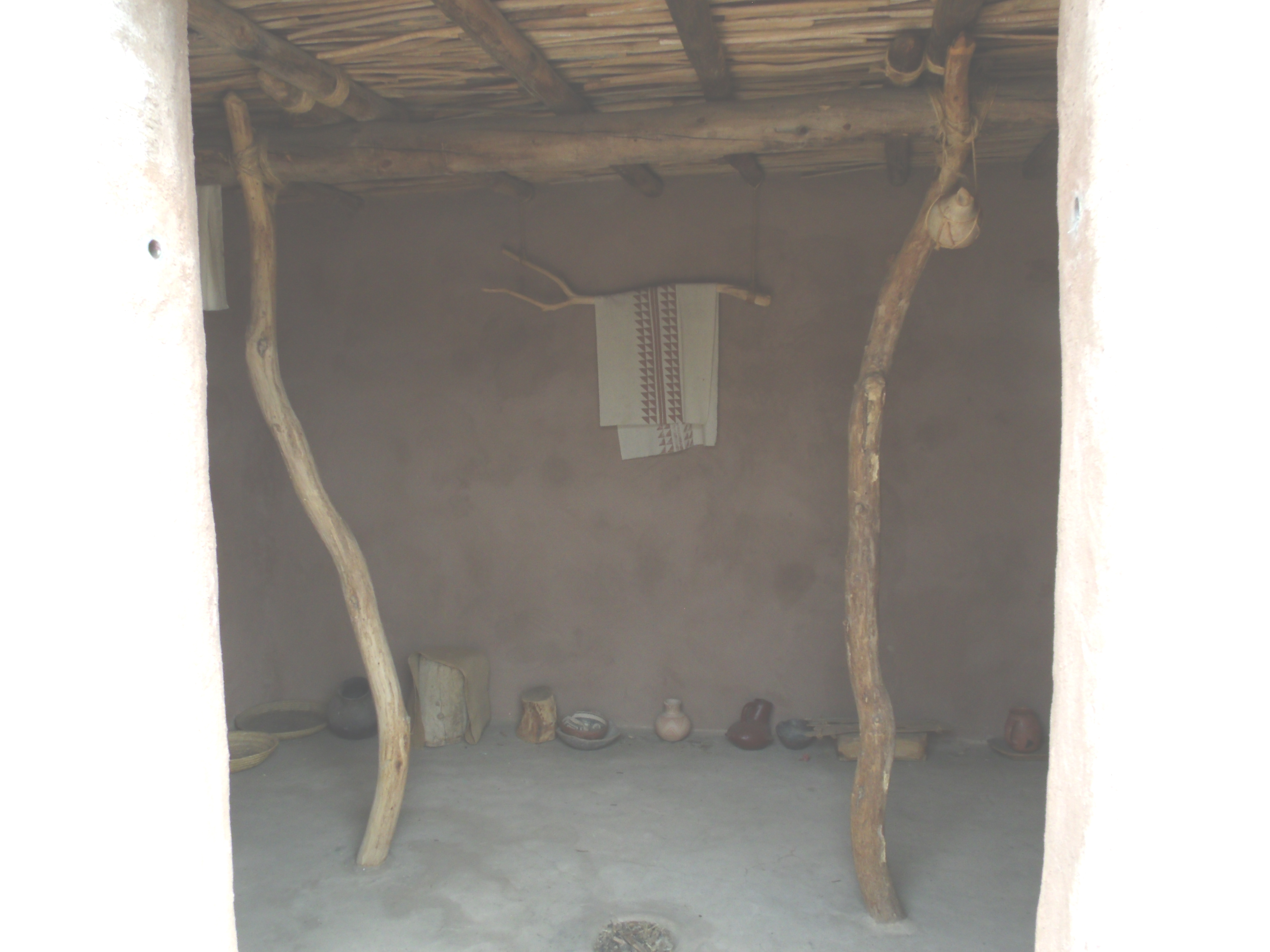
Inside view of the Adobe Compound Replica

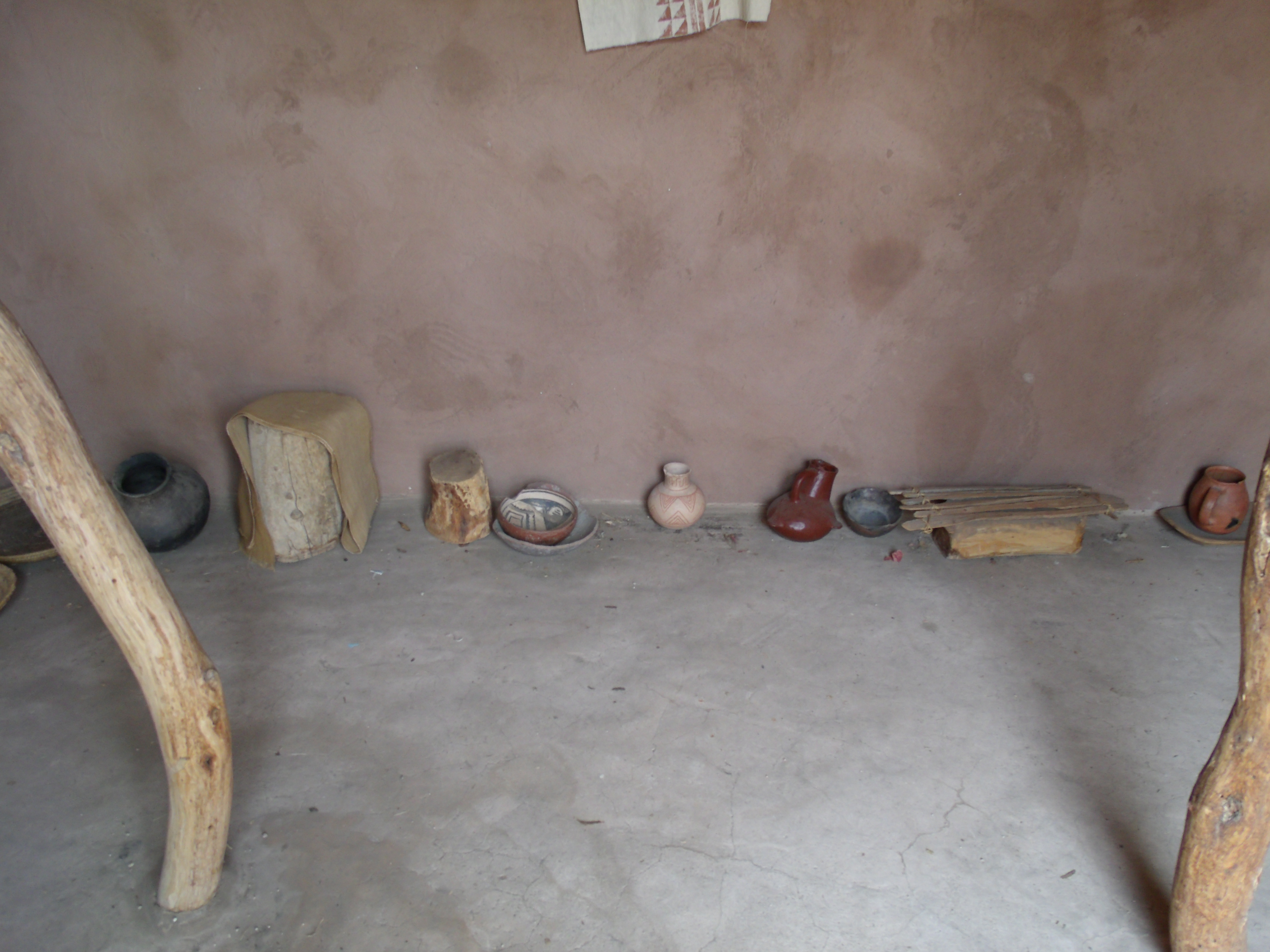
Artifacts inside of the Adobe Compound Replica

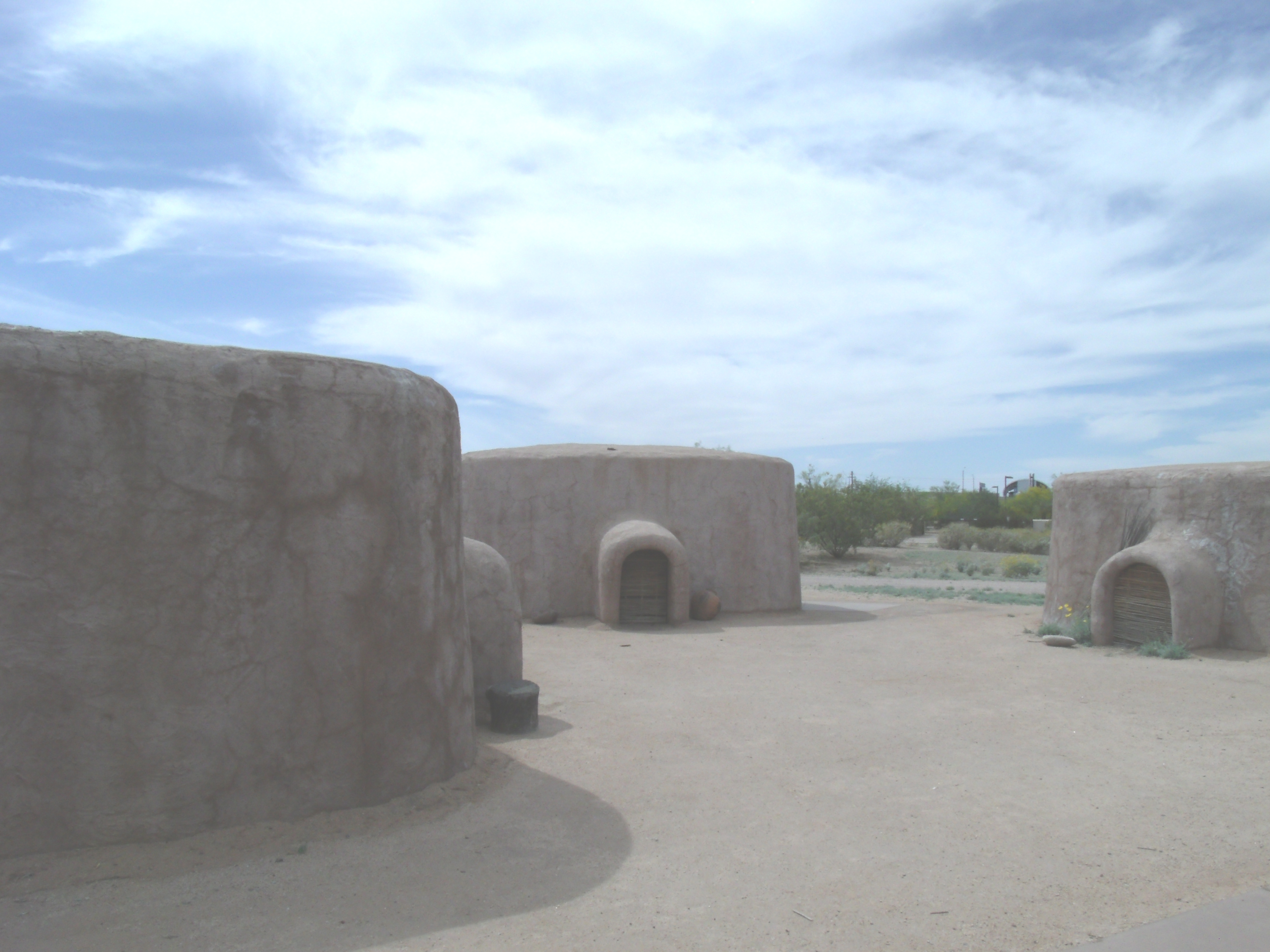
These replicas represent what the Hohokam pit-houses looked like 1000 years ago.

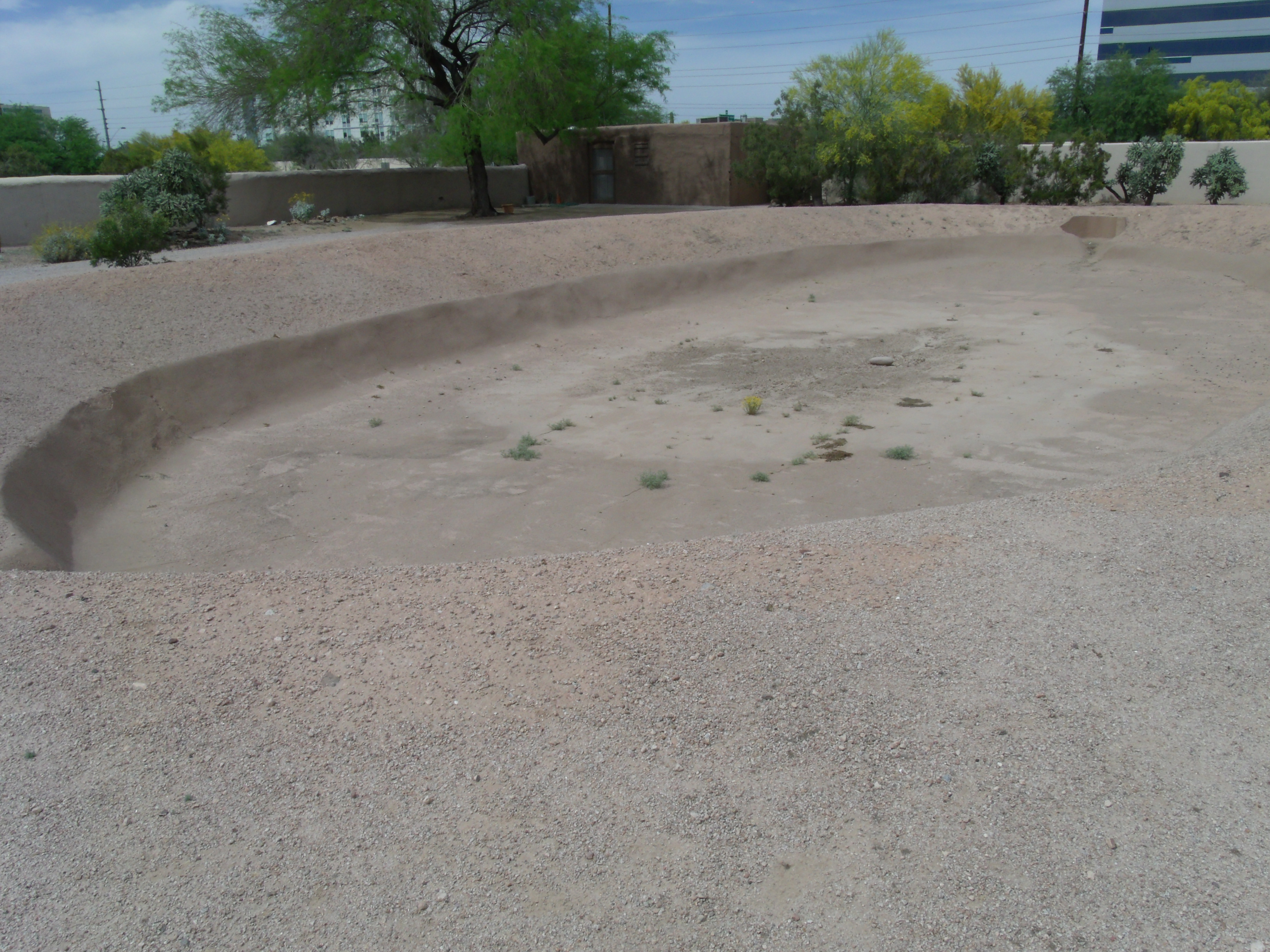
This was a Hohokam ballpark where they played ceremonial ball games. The villagers stood on top of the surrounding mound to observe the game.

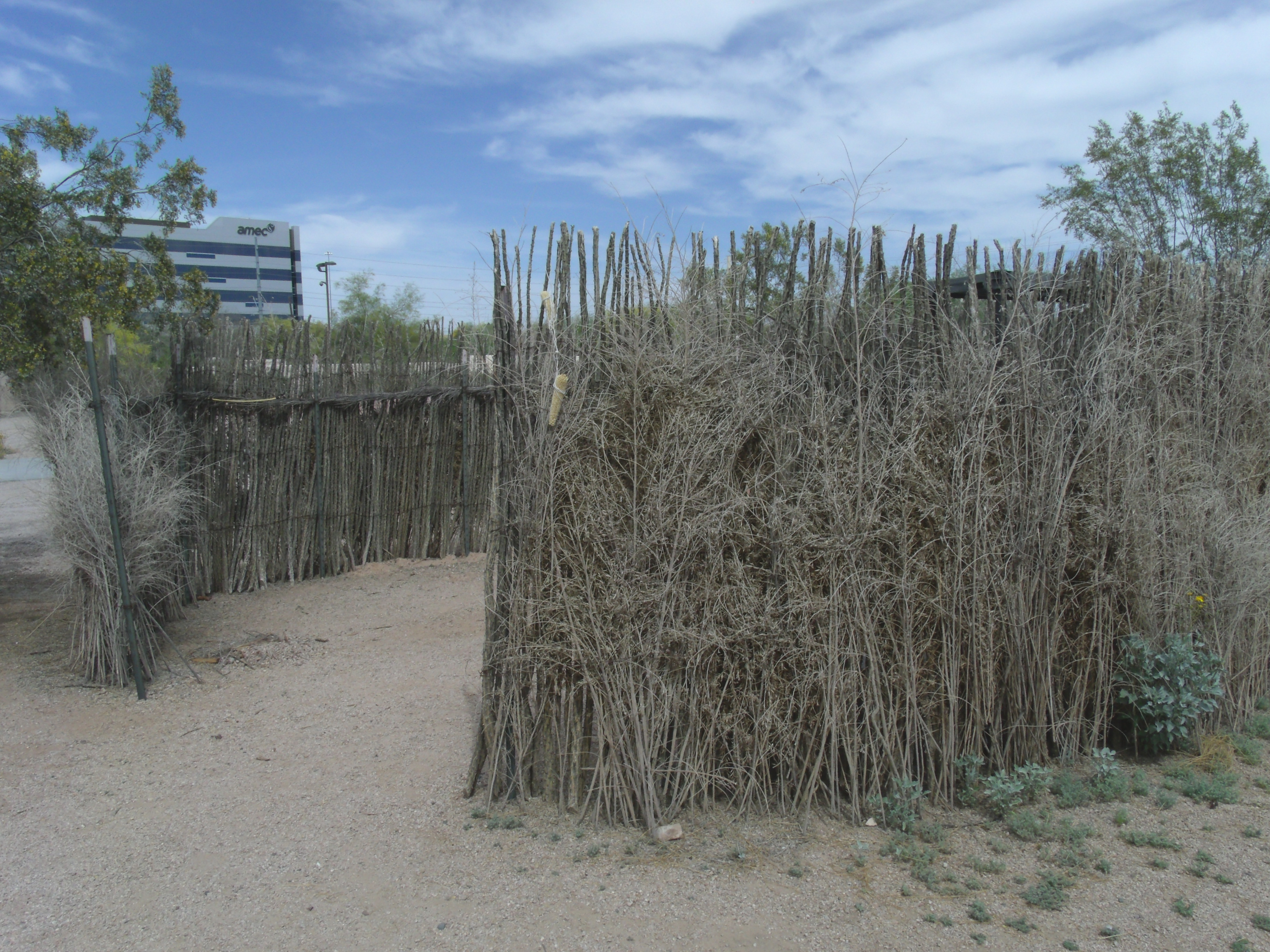
Made from mesquite, these kitchens were used by the O'odham people, believed to be descendants of the Hohokam, in the 1600s.

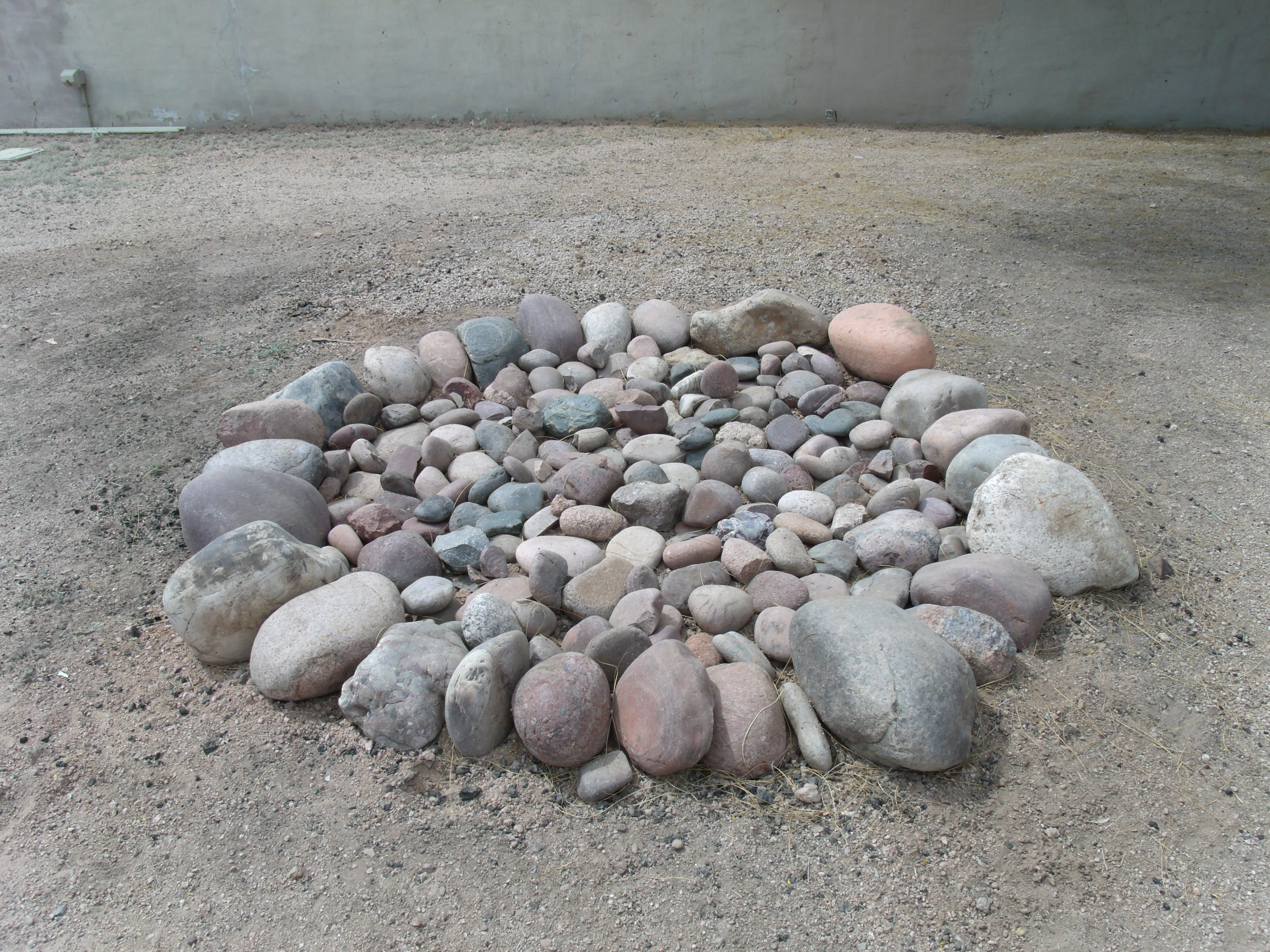
The ovens were shared by the Hohokam community.

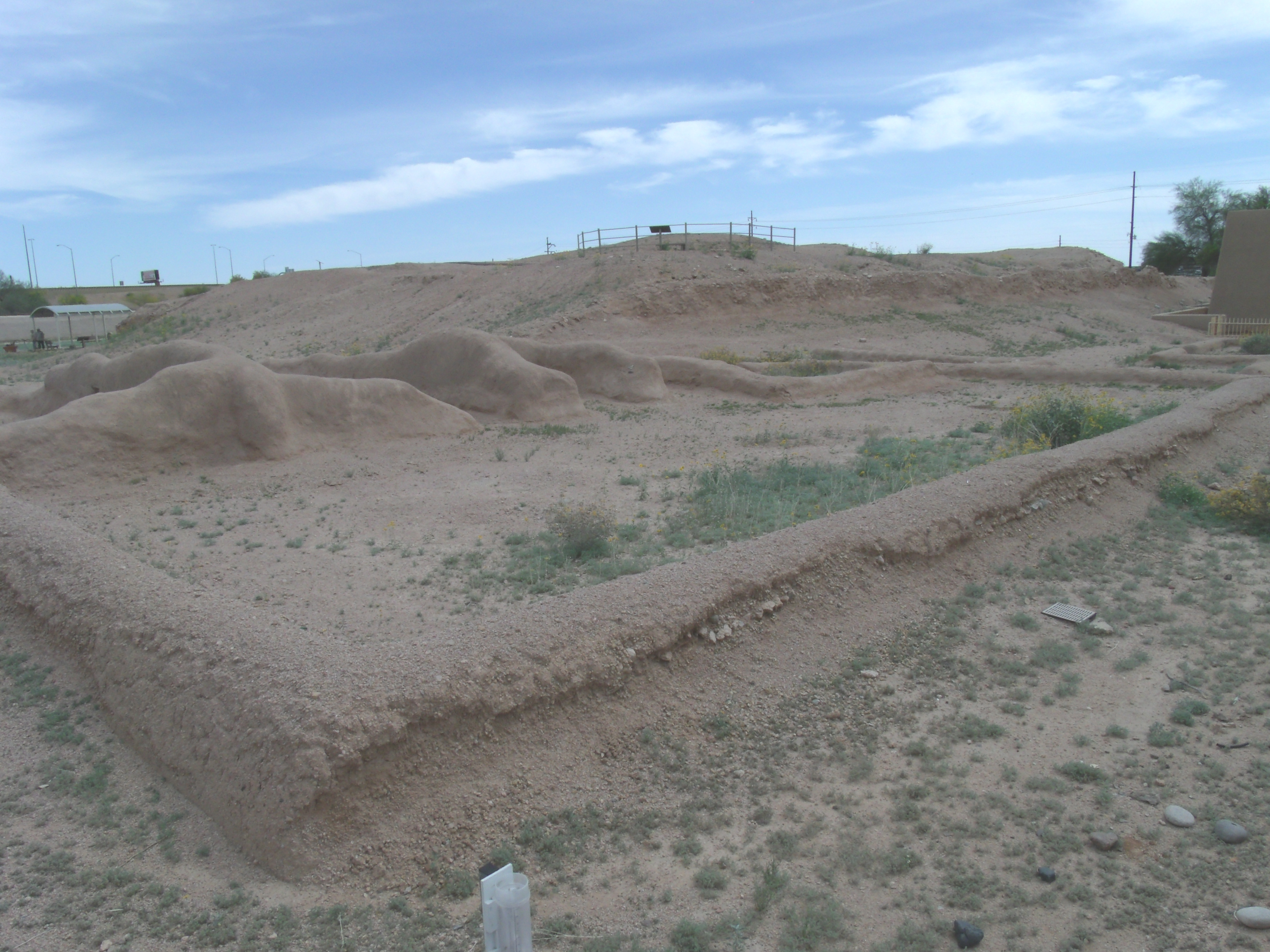
Partial view of the Hohokam Village

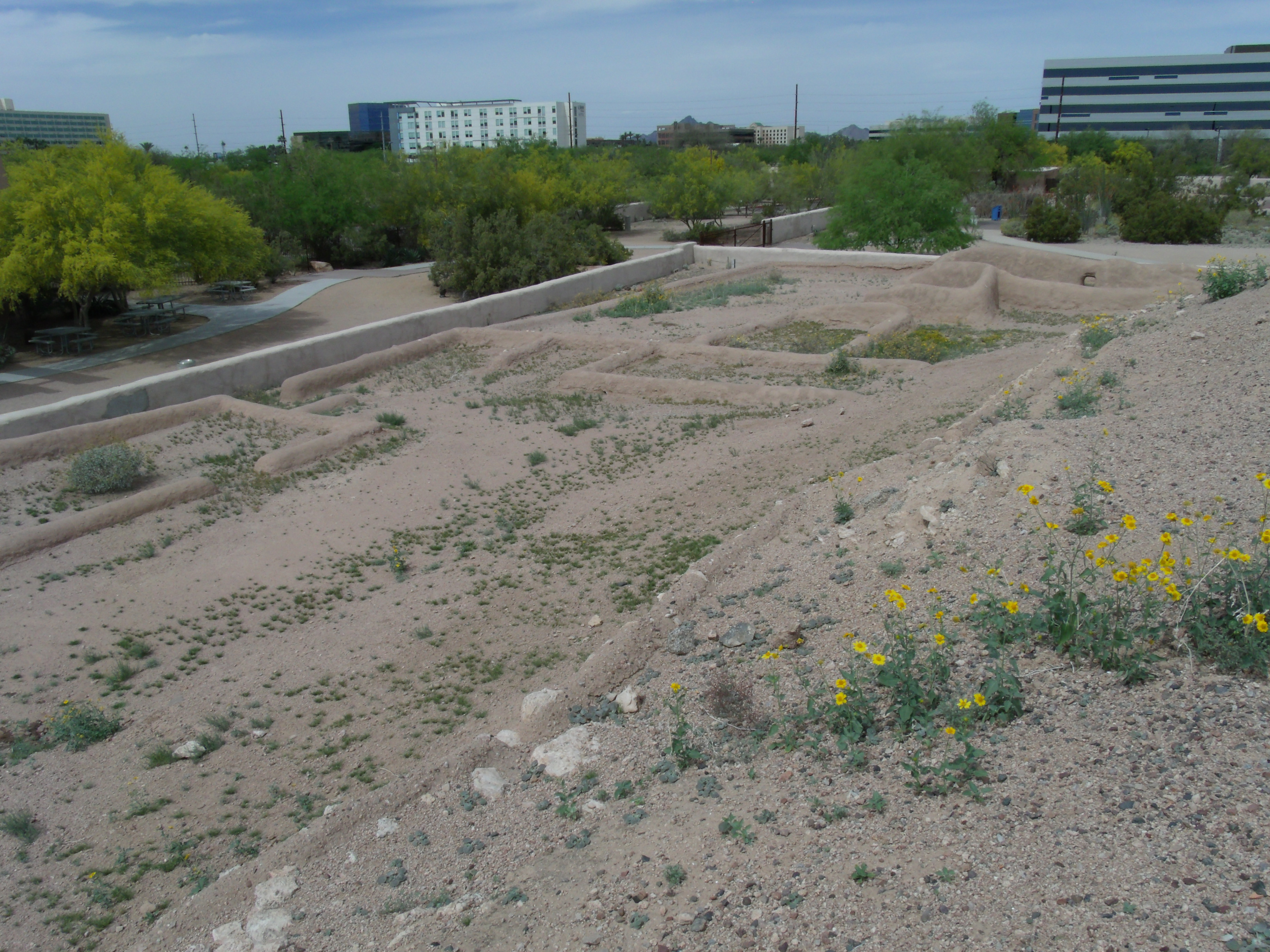
Different view of the Hohokam Village

== See also ==
- Hohokam – other sites:
  - Casa Grande Ruins National Monument
  - Hohokam Pima National Monument
  - Mesa Grande
  - Snaketown
  - Indian Mesa
- List of historic properties in Phoenix
- Phoenix Historic Property Register
