= Casa Grande Ruins National Monument =

Ancient place in Coolidge, Arizona

- IUCN category III (natural monument or feature)
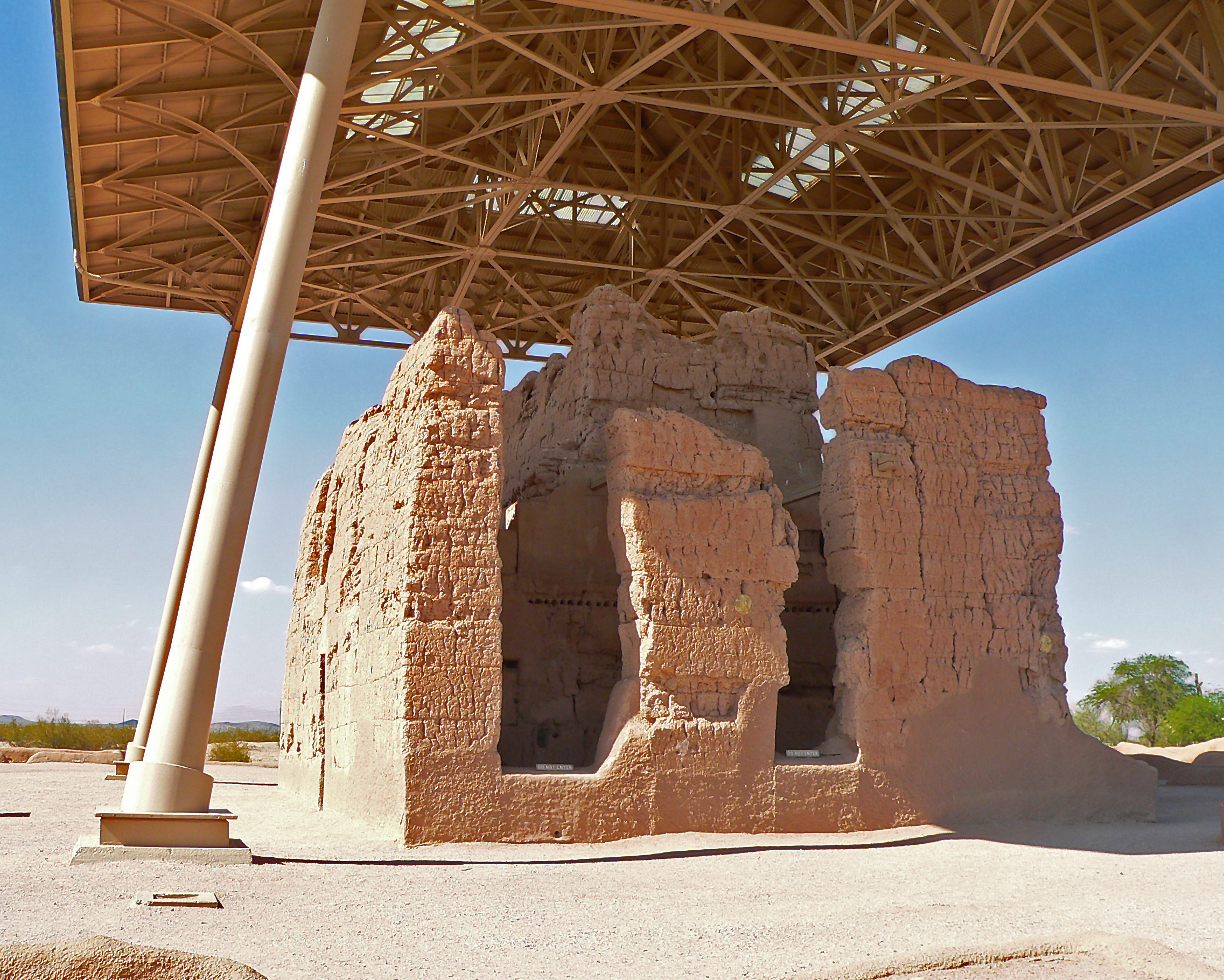
- The southern facade of the "Big House"

- Location within Arizona Location within the United States
- Interactive map of Casa Grande Ruins National Monument
- Location: Pinal County, Arizona, USA
- Nearest city: Coolidge
- Coordinates: 32.9970051°N 111.5320692°W
- Area: 472.5 acres (191.2 ha)
- Created: August 3, 1918
- Visitors: 87,748 (in 2025)
- Governing body: National Park Service
- Website: Casa Grande Ruins National Monument
- Casa Grande Ruins National Monument
- U.S. National Register of Historic Places
- NRHP reference No.: 66000192
- Added to NRHP: October 15, 1966

Casa Grande Ruins National Monument (O'odham: Siwañ Waʼa Ki: or Sivan Vahki) is a United States national monument preserving a group of Classic Period (1150–1450 CE) Hohokam structures in Coolidge, Arizona, northeast of Casa Grande.

== History of the area ==
The national monument consists of the ruins of multiple structures surrounded by a compound wall, constructed by the ancient people of the Hohokam period. They farmed the Gila Valley in the early 13th century. Archeologists have discovered evidence that the people of the ancient Sonoran Desert, who built the Casa Grande, also developed wide-scale irrigation farming and extensive trade connections which lasted over a thousand years until about 1450 CE.

"Casa Grande" is Spanish for "big house" (Siwañ Wa'a Ki: in O'odham). These names refer to the largest structure on the site, which is what remains of a four-story structure that may have been abandoned by 1450. The structure is made of caliche, and has managed to survive the extreme weather conditions for about seven centuries. The large house consists of outer rooms surrounding an inner structure. The outer rooms are all three stories high, while the inner structure is four stories high. The structures were constructed using traditional adobe processes. The wet adobe is thicker at the base and adds significant strength. Noticeable horizontal cracks define the breaks between courses on the thick outer walls. The process consisted of using damp adobe to form the walls and then waiting for it to dry, and then building it up with more adobe. Casa Grande contained a ball court much like that found at the Pueblo Grande Ruin and Irrigation Sites. Father Eusebio Kino was the first European to view the Hohokam complex in November 1694 and named it Casa Grande. Graffiti from 19th-century passers-by is scratched into its walls, though this is now illegal. Casa Grande now has a distinctive modern roof covering built in 1932.

== Administrative history ==
In 1891, the monument underwent repairs supervised by Cosmos Mindeleff of the Bureau of American Ethnology, until funds ran out. Proclaimed Casa Grande Reservation on June 22, 1892 by Executive Order 28-A of President Benjamin Harrison, 480 acres around the ruins became the first prehistoric and cultural reserve in the United States. It was then re-designated a U.S. national monument by President Woodrow Wilson on August 3, 1918. As with all historical areas administered by the National Park Service, Casa Grande was listed on the National Register of Historic Places on October 15, 1966.

== Historic adobes ==
Between 1937 and 1940 the Civilian Conservation Corps built several adobe buildings to serve as housing and administrative offices for the national monument. The adobe buildings, constructed using traditional methods, continue in use today and are now listed on the National Register of Historic Places. Because of careful conservation, the physical appearance of Casa Grande Ruins has hardly changed since the 1940s.

== Olmsted shelter ==
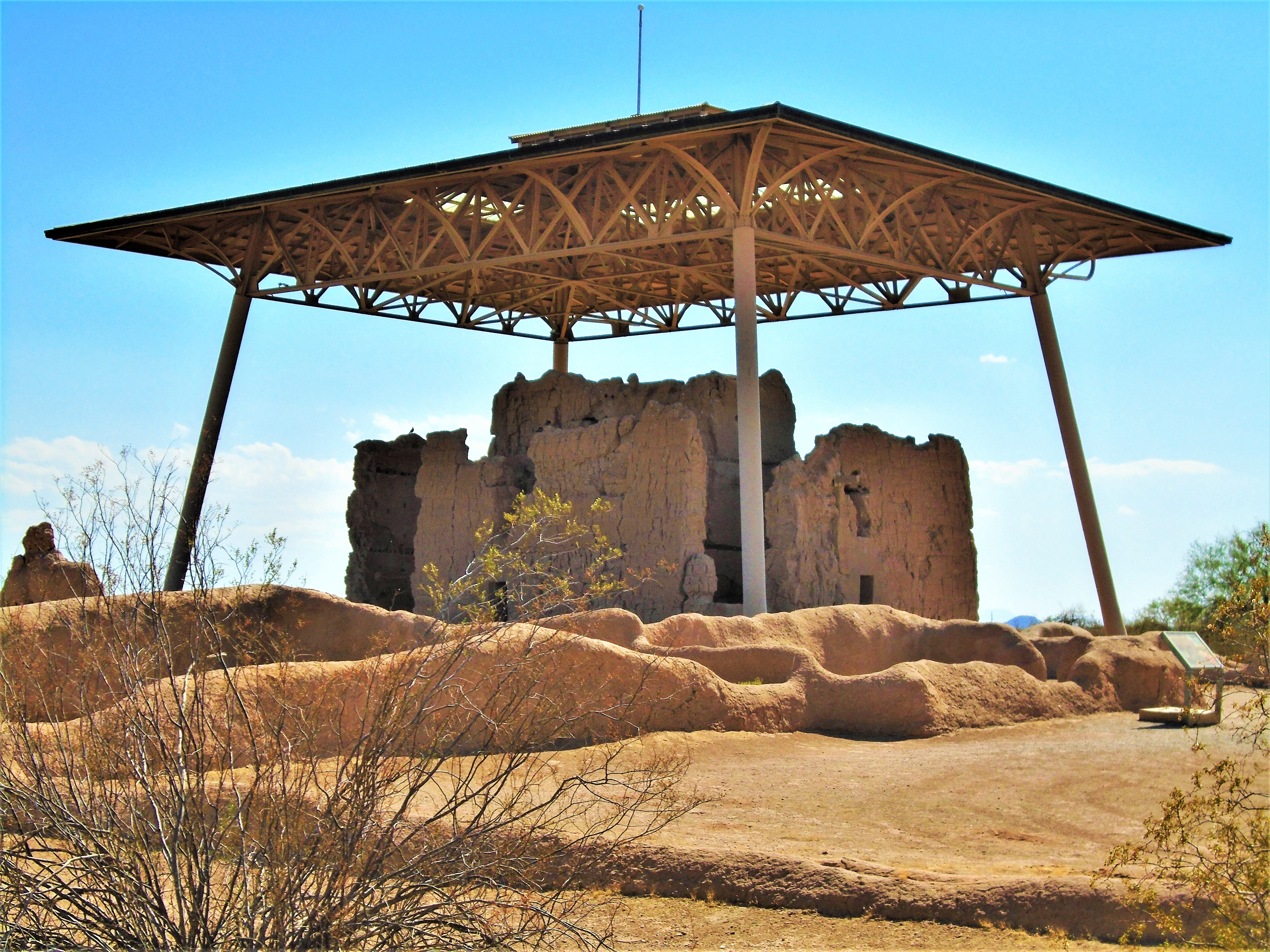
The Big House under the Olmsted shelter

In 1932, a ramada to shelter the ruins from weathering was built by Boston architect Frederick Law Olmsted Jr. In the early 21st century, a pair of great horned owls took up residence in the rafters of the Olmsted shelter.

The current protective structure covering the "Great House" replaced a wooden similar structure built to protect it in 1903. Due to the fragile nature of the "Great House", visitors to the site are not permitted inside. To protect its integrity, observation by visitors is only permitted outside the structure.

== Gallery ==
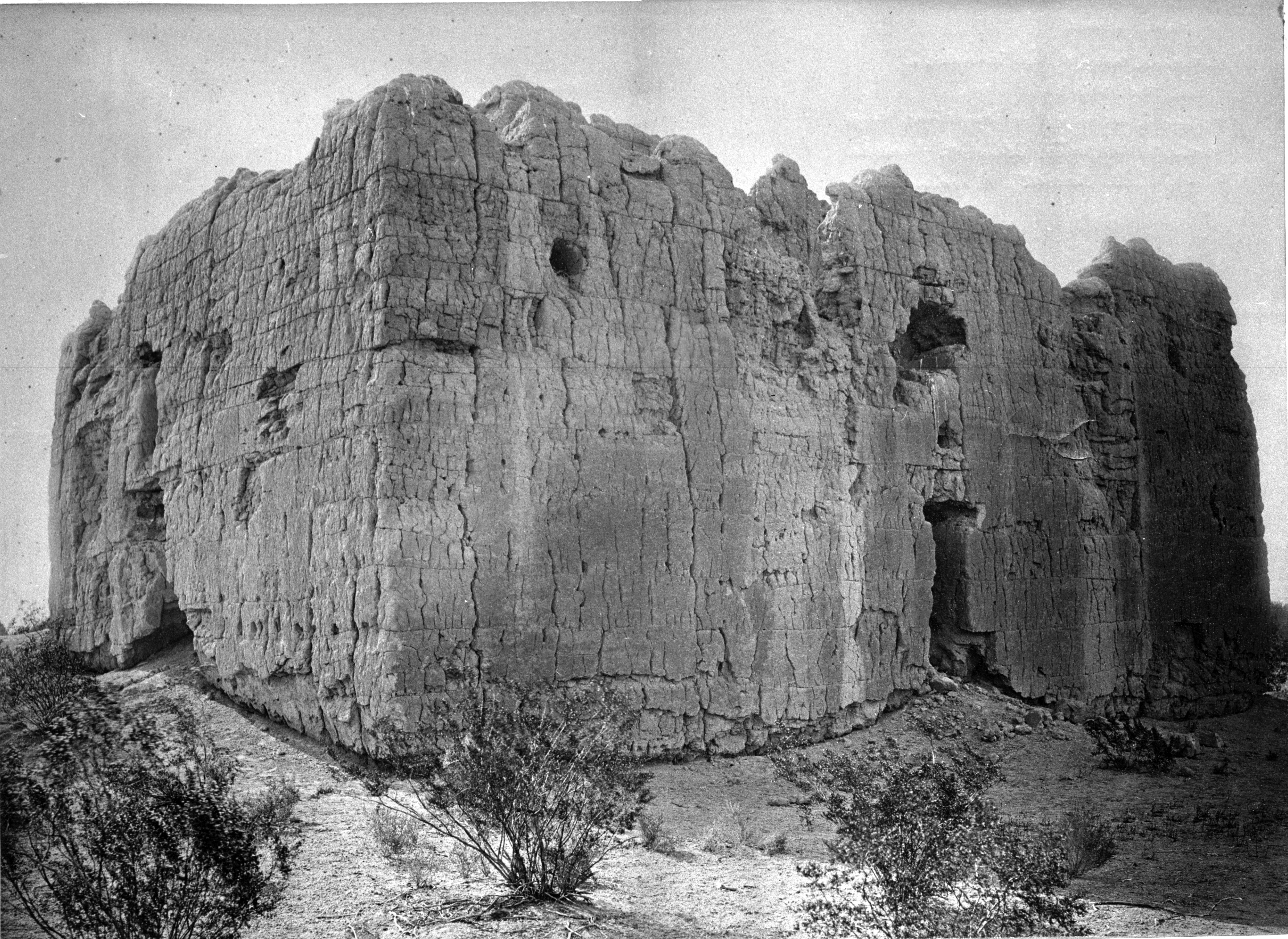
West wall of the Casa Grande c.1880

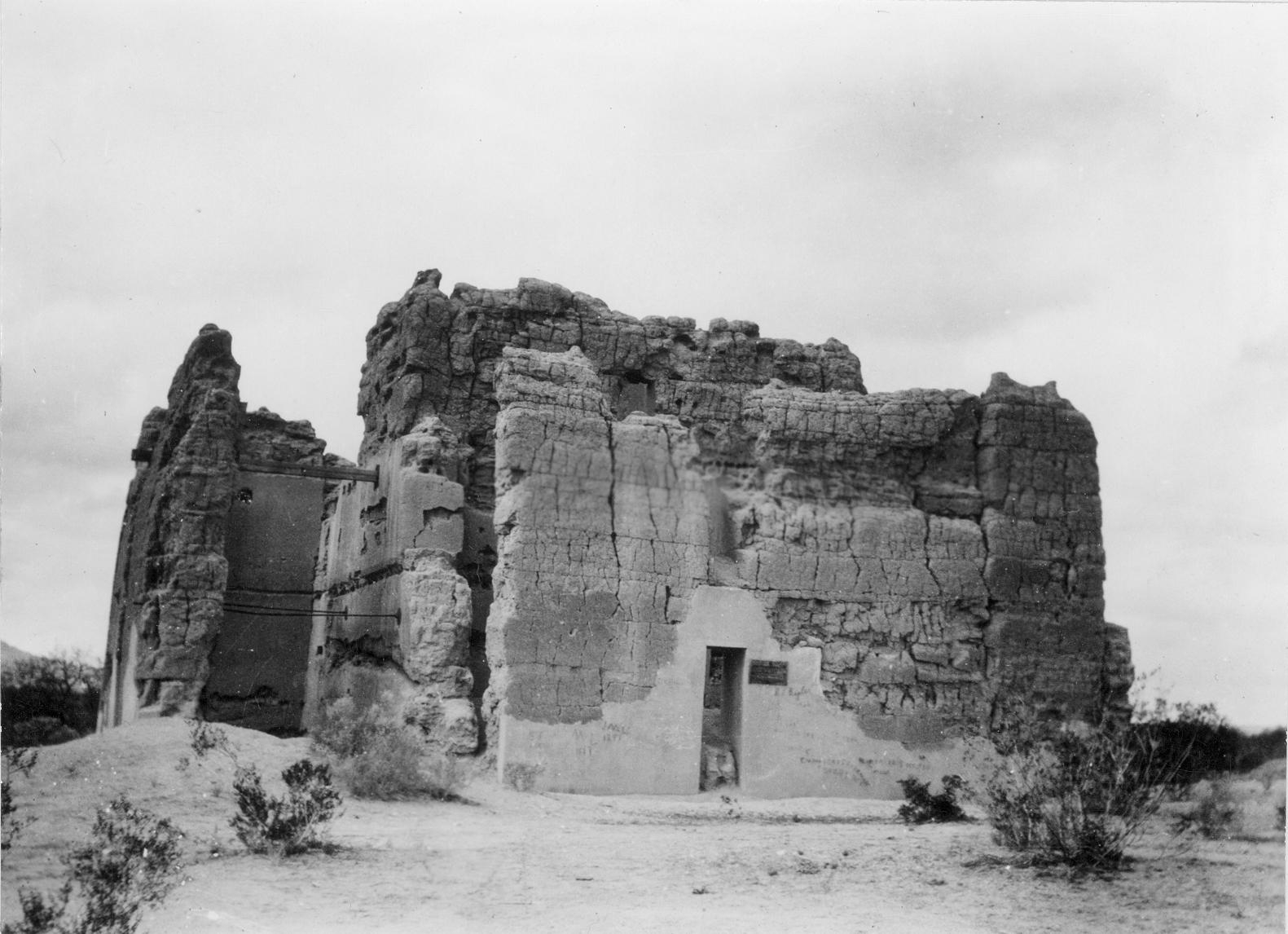
The east side of the Casa Grande c.1900

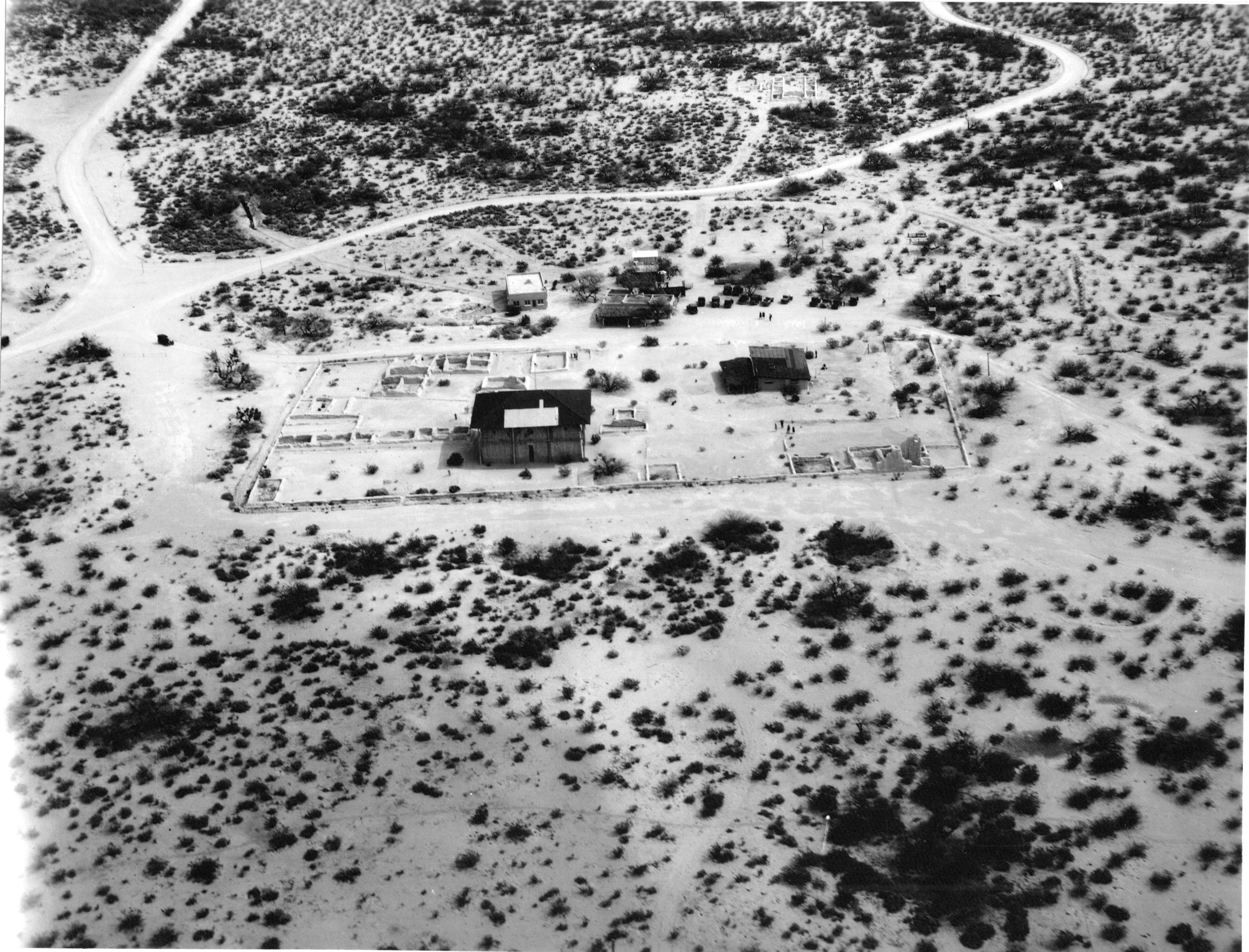
Aerial image 1940s

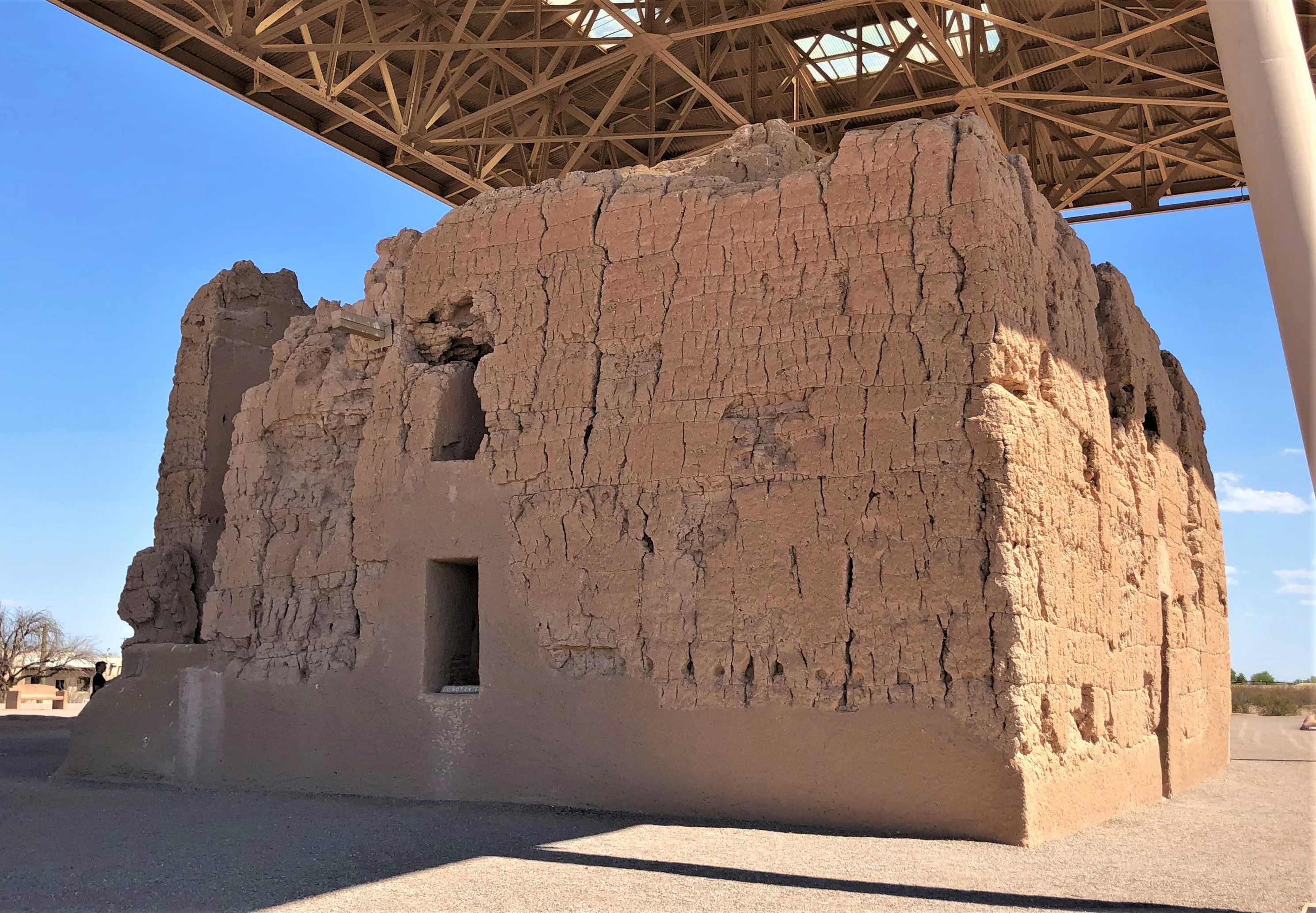
The northern facade from the south

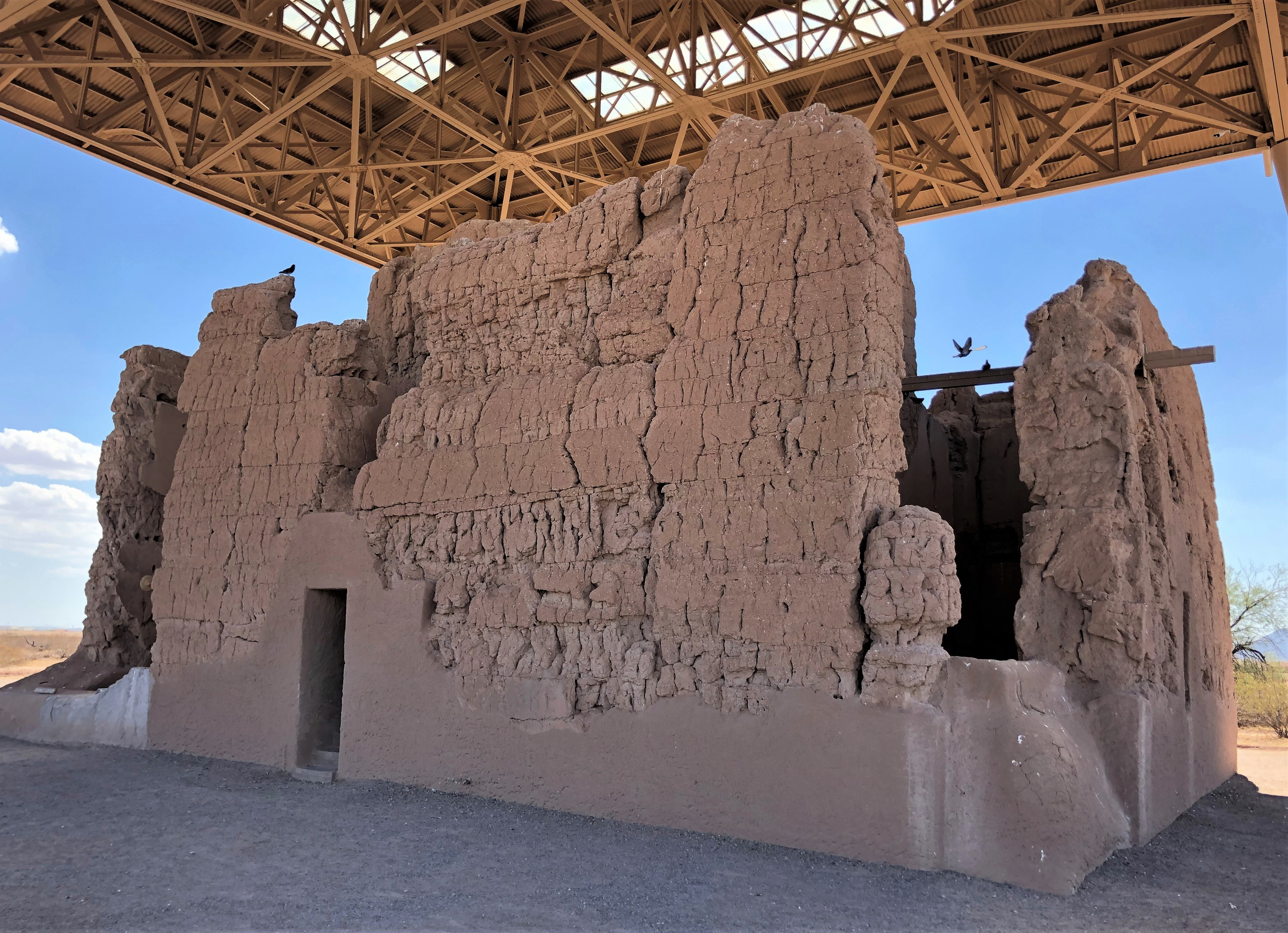
The northeast corner of the Big House

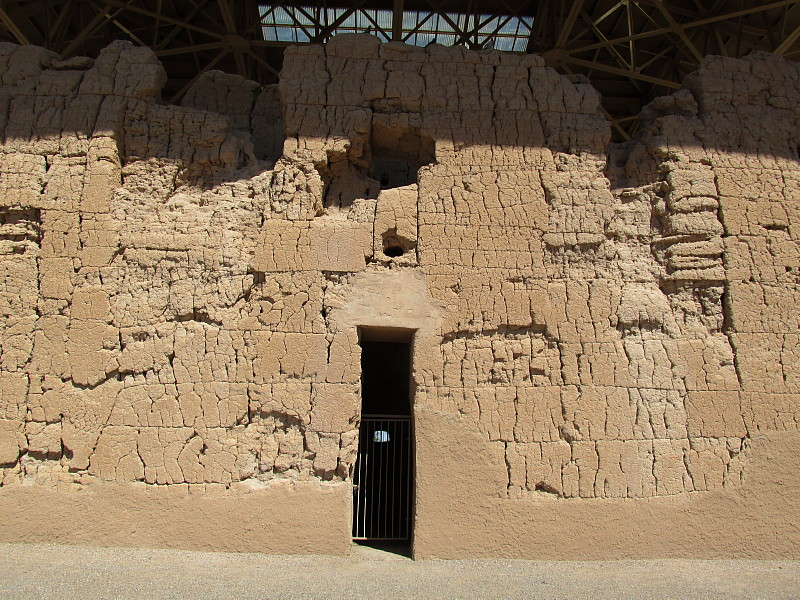
Doorway to the Big House

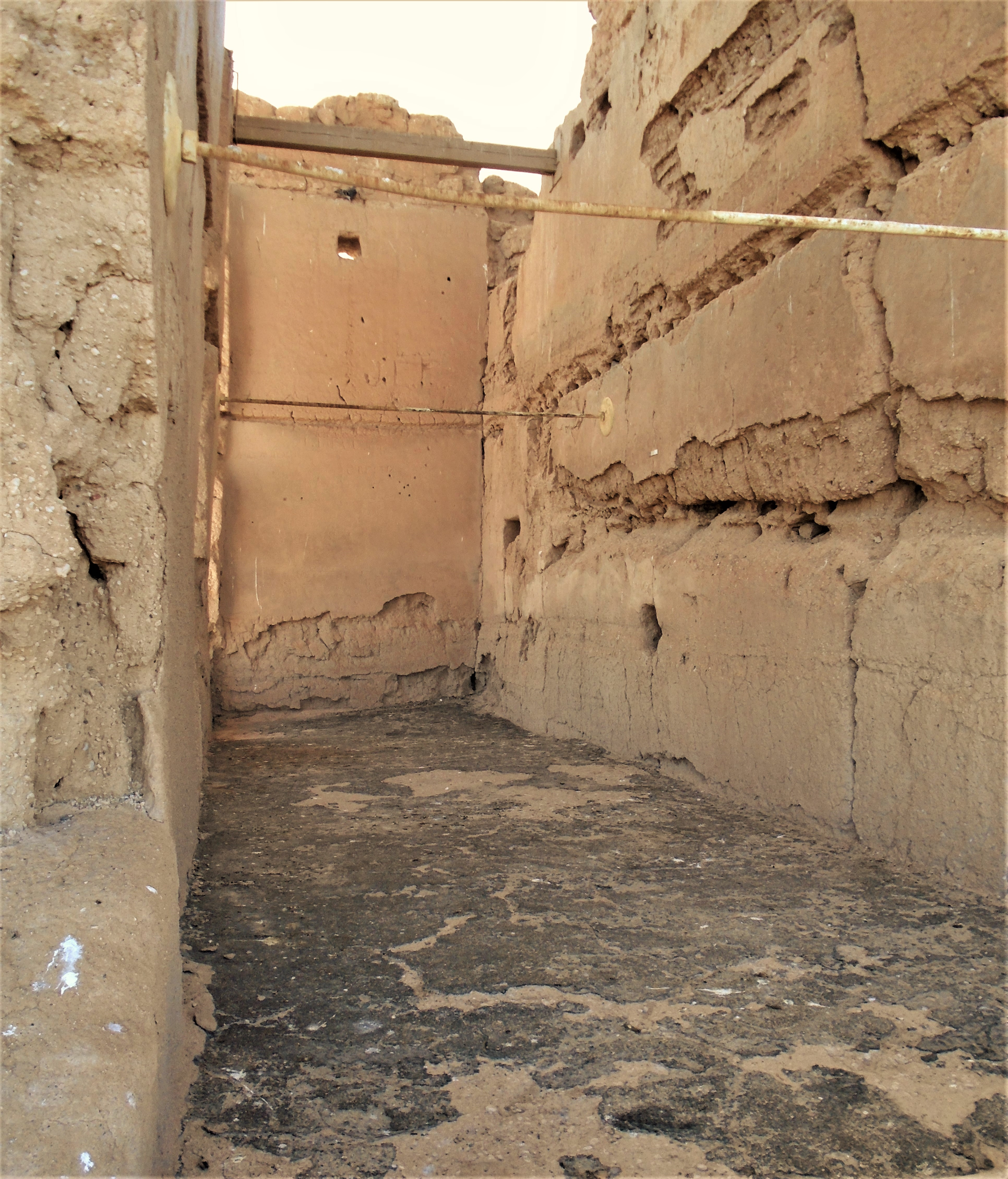
Inside the Big House

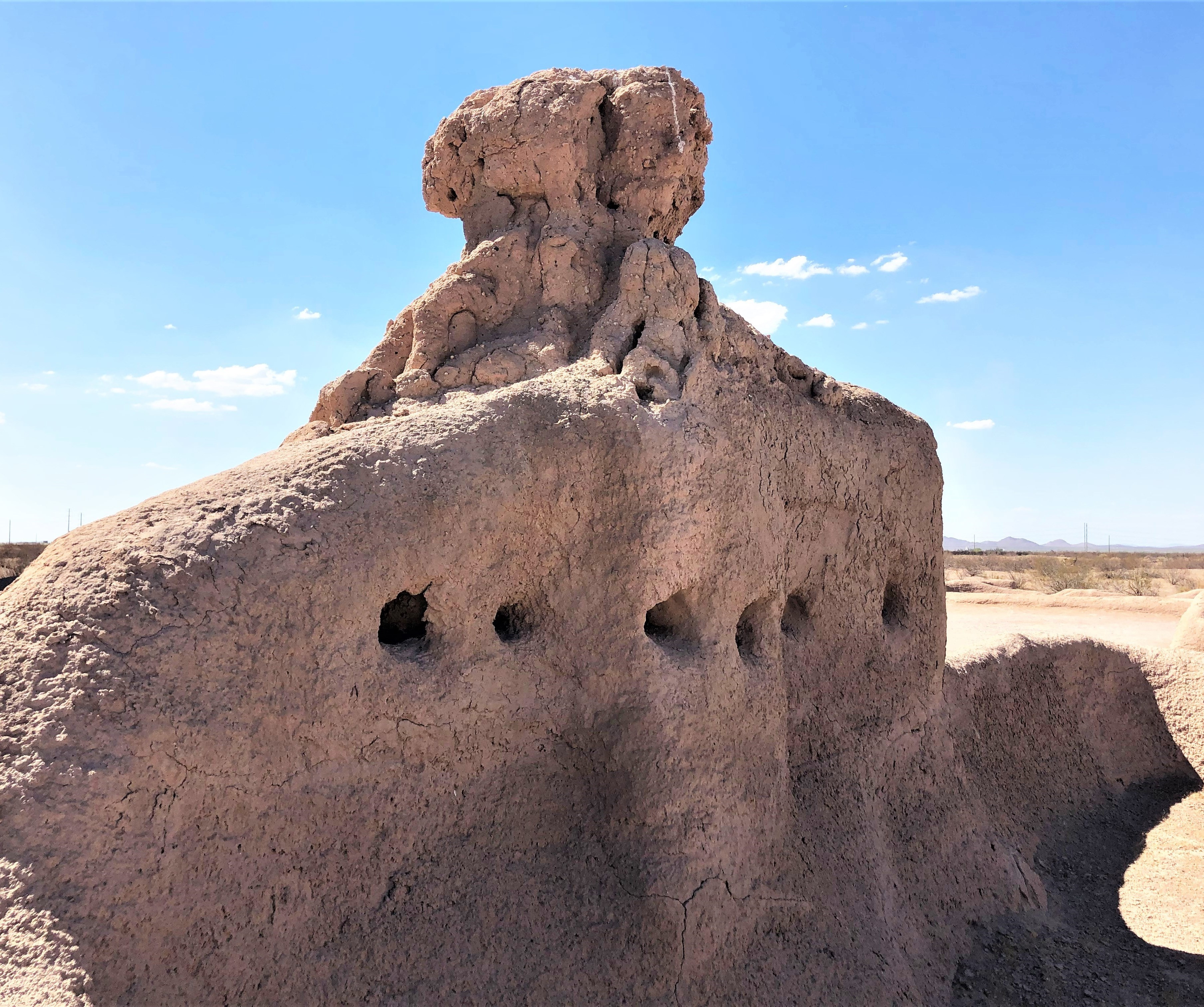
Another ruin in the monument, just to the east

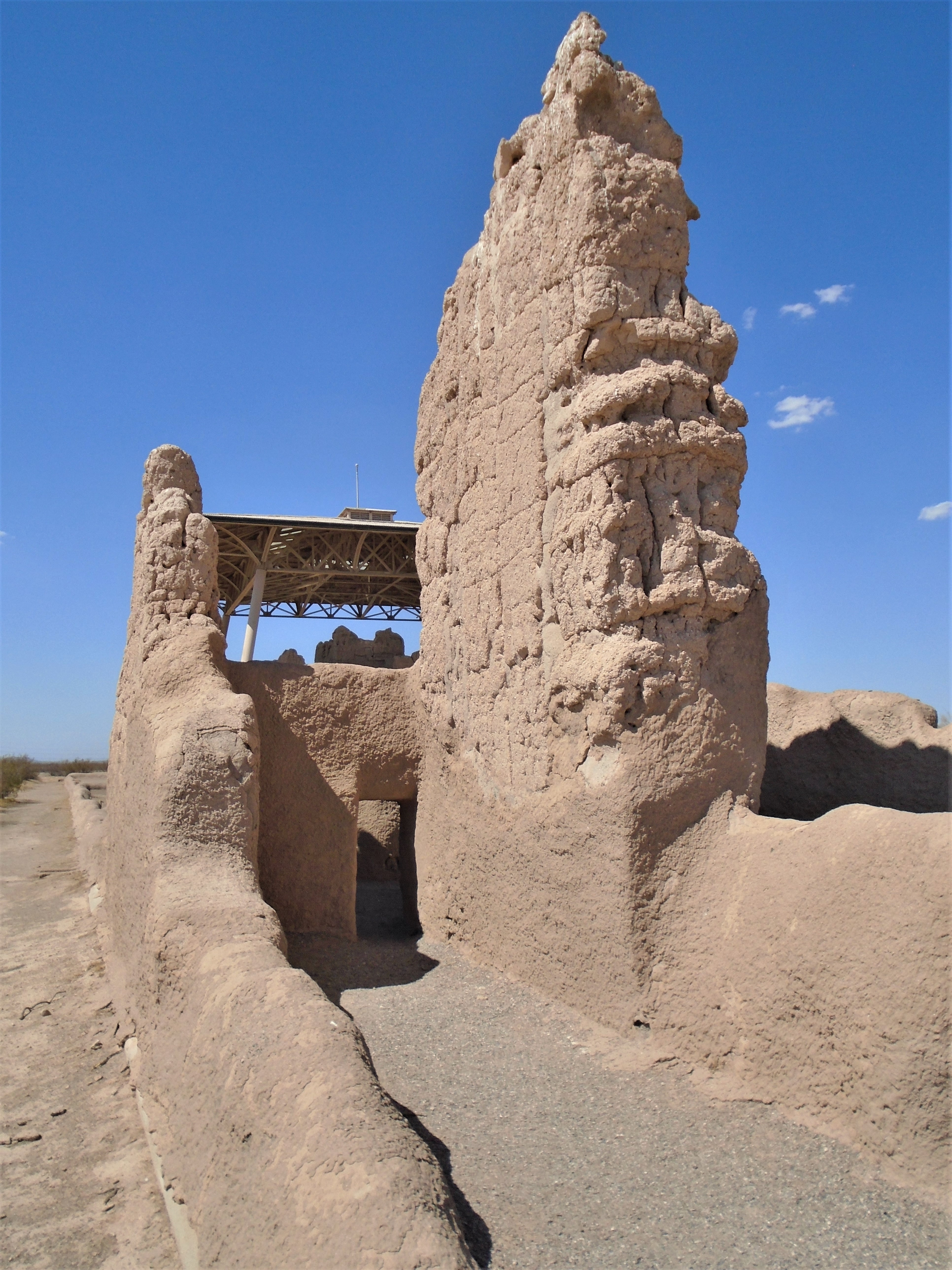
A ruin to the south of the Big House

== See also ==
- Hohokam Pima National Monument
- List of national monuments of the United States
- List of the oldest buildings in Arizona
- Mesa Grande
- Oasisamerica cultures
- Pueblo Grande Ruin and Irrigation Sites
