= Ramada (shelter) =

Shelter with a roof and no walls, common in the southwestern U.S.

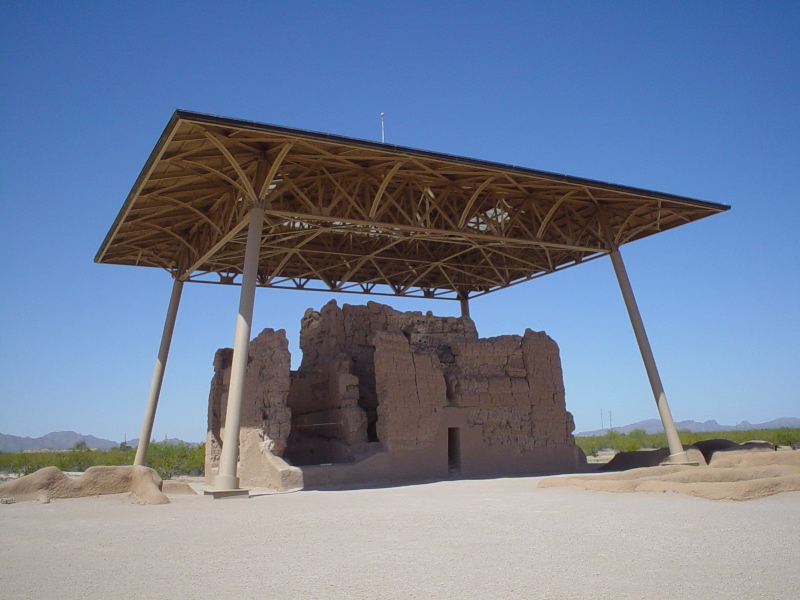
The Olmsted ramada over the Big House of Casa Grande National Monument in Arizona.

A ramada (from Spanish rama 'branch') is a temporary or permanent shelter in the Southwestern United States equipped with a roof but no walls, or only partially enclosed.

Ramadas have traditionally been constructed with branches or bushes by indigenous Americans living in the region. However, the term today is also applied to permanent concrete, wooden, or steel structures used to shelter objects or people from the sun. For example, public parks in desert areas of the United States may contain ramadas with picnic tables, restrooms, water sources, etc. Since sunlight is more of an environmental hazard than wind or snow or rain in this part of the world, a roof alone provides substantial shelter. And because there are no walls in the structure, airflow is unrestricted, helping the solar barrier keep the temperature below the roof somewhat cooler than ambient.

An example of a large modern-day ramada can be seen at the Casa Grande Ruins National Monument in Arizona, where it is used to protect ancient ruins.
