= The Conscience Pile =

Pile of petrified wood returned by visitors

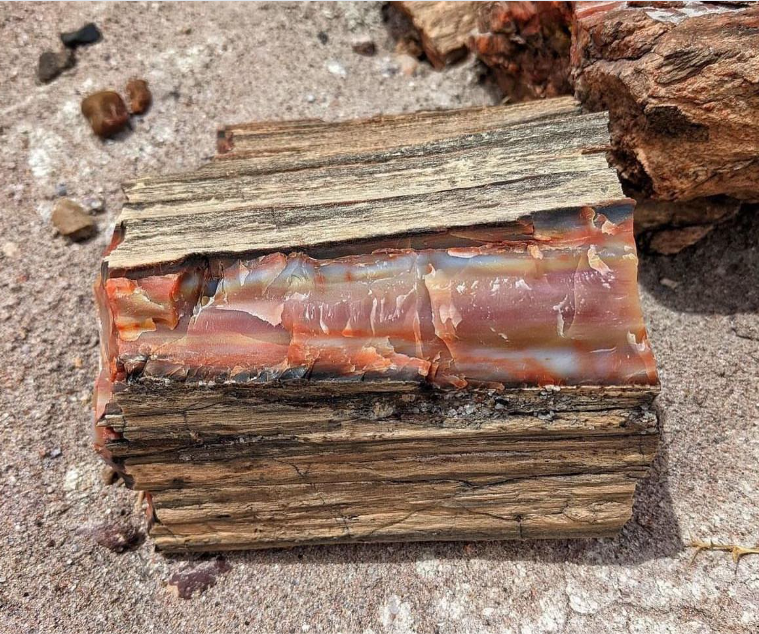
A piece of petrified wood in Petrified Forest National Park, Arizona, United States.

The Conscience Pile is a pile of petrified wood in the Petrified Forest National Park, Arizona, United States, that is made of specimens that were illegally removed from the park by visitors and later sent back to the park, often in the mail.

== Overview ==
Some visitors to Petrified Forest National Park in Arizona steal pieces of petrified wood (a misnomer) despite laws in place to prevent this act. At some point, a myth or rumor began to circulate that alleged it causes bad luck to those who steal the pieces of petrified wood from the park. Another version of the myth says that those who remove the pieces of petrified wood become cursed.

As such, some visitors who steal the petrified wood — either after a string of bad luck, or because their conscience tells them it was wrong to steal the petrified wood — return it to the park, often in the mail. Some of them send a letter when returning the wood.

Park rangers are unable to return the petrified wood to the park itself unless they are able to ascertain the specific location in the park from which it came. As such, they place the wood in a pile near the ranger station which the rangers have dubbed The Conscience Pile. They also display some of the letters that have come in the mail from former visitors who return the plundered wood. Some of the letters on display date back as far as 1938.

== In popular culture ==
The 2015 book Bad Luck, Hot Rocks features letters sent along with the rocks that are eventually put into The Conscience Pile.

2019 Netflix comedy Dead to Me featured a storyline inspired by The Conscience Pile.

On October 26, 2025, This American Life included a story about The Conscience Pile in episode 871, "The Thing About Things".
