= Kraterokheirodon =

Kraterokheirodon Temporal range: Late Triassic, 225–213 Ma

Scientific classification
- Domain: Eukaryota
- Kingdom: Animalia
- Phylum: Chordata
- Clade: Reptiliomorpha
- Clade: Amniota
- Clade: incertae sedis
- Genus: †Kraterokheirodon; Irmis & Parker, 2005
- Species: †K. colberti

Binomial name
- †Kraterokheirodon colberti Irmis & Parker, 2005

Extinct genus of tetrapods

Kraterokheirodon ("cupped hand tooth") is an extinct genus of enigmatic tetrapod, that was possibly an amniote, from the Late Triassic Chinle Formation of Arizona. The type and only species is K. colberti. Although it is known only from two large teeth, their shape is so unlike those of any other animal that Kraterokheirodon cannot definitively be classified under any known group of tetrapods. Its discovery also indicates that our understanding of Late Triassic tetrapod diversity is still incomplete, with Kraterokheirodon representing an otherwise unknown lineage of large tetrapod in western North America.

== Description ==
The teeth of Kraterokheirodon are broad and relatively large—27.7 mm across at their base and approximately 19 mm high—with an arched ridge across its crown. Without associated jaws, even the orientation of the teeth are unknown, but the ridge has been interpreted as running transversely across the tooth from side-to-side, rather than front to back. The tooth crown possesses six cusps, the innermost of which is the largest (12.5 mm across) while the second cusp is the smallest (4.8 mm across). The remaining four cusps are roughly equal in size. Each cusp bears a vertical ridge that run down either side of the tooth, although the ridge of cusp II is pinched off by the ridges of cusps I and III. Cusps IV, V and VI run down the side of each tooth and are angled outwards (labially), curving slightly towards the probable back of the tooth. Likewise, the crown expands and flattens out to form a shelf on what's presumed to be the back side of the teeth. One of the two specimens (AMNH 4947) possesses a clear root, and indicates that the teeth likely had a thecodont implantation, meaning the roots were not fused to the jaw bones and were embedded in sockets. Enamel is present only on the crown of the teeth, and shows patterns of wear indicating that the teeth occluded while eating.

Although very little can be determined about the appearance of Kraterokheirodon, the size of its teeth indicate that they must have belonged to a large-bodied animal.

== History of discovery ==
The first tooth of Kraterokheirodon was collected in September, 1946 by Guy E. Hazen, a member of the USGS, from St. Johns in the Apache County of Arizona. He presented the tooth to palaeontologist Edwin ("Ned") Colbert that year, who redeposited the specimen at the American Museum of Natural History with the label AMNH 4947. A second tooth, PEFO 9984, was discovered in 1984 from the Petrified Forest National Park by Lynette Gillette, just north of the Dinosaur Hill Quarry. This tooth is less complete than AMNH 4947, missing the root and half of the crown. In 1995, these teeth were presumed to belong to a "huge" traversodont cynodont by Robert A. Long and Phillip A. Murry in a review of Late Triassic vertebrates from the southwestern United States. Both teeth were under study by Colbert until his death in 2001, and the specimens subsequently went missing.

In 2002, casts of both teeth and the original specimen of PEFO 9984 were rediscovered in Colbert's office, however the original specimen of AMNH 4947 remains missing. The teeth were then studied by palaeontologists Randy Irmis and William Parker, who would formally name them as the new taxon Kraterokheirodon colberti in 2005. The genus name is derived from the Ancient Greek krater (cup), kheiros (hand), and odon (tooth), to refer to the superficial resemblance of the teeth's shape to a cupped hand. The species was named in honour of Edwin "Ned" Colbert. Despite being incomplete, PEFO 9984 was designated as the holotype of Kraterokheirodon due to the original specimen of AMNH 4947 being lost.

Although the exact field location is unknown, AMNH 4947 was likely collected from either the top of the Bluewater Creek Member or from the base of the Blue Mesa Member of the Chinle Formation, dated to the late Carnian between 217 and 225 Ma. PEFO 9984 was collected from the middle of the younger Petrified Forest Member, which has been dated to the early or middle Norian at approximately 213 Ma. This indicates that Kraterokheirodon had a long stratigraphic range, in spite of its rarity.

Despite the inferred large body size and long stratigraphic range of Kraterokheirodon, there are as yet no known isolated body fossils that could potentially be attributed to this species. This is in spite almost a century of geological and palaeontological study of the Chinle Formation, and indicates that the faunal diversity of the Late Triassic is still incompletely understood, including unknown species of large tetrapods like Kraterokheirodon, even in well sampled locations such as western North America.

== Classification ==
Although only known by its teeth, Kraterokheirodon was compared to the teeth of other Triassic vertebrate groups to try and determine its relationships, as teeth can be diagnostic to vertebrate lineages. However, the unique structure of its teeth does not match those seen in any other known fossils. The presence of thecodont roots in particular, present in both Archosauriformes and synapsids, supports an amniote affinity for Kraterokheirodon, and they likewise do not match any similar teeth known from lungfish or actinopterygian fish, as well as those of temnospondyl amphibians.

Within Amniota, multiple lineages have multicusped teeth like Kraterokheirodon, including early archosauromorphs, crocodylomorphs, dinosaurs and pterosaurs, although they only show vague similarities to Kraterokheirodon. Superficially, Kraterokheirodon most closely resembles the lower postcanine teeth of traversodont cynodonts, including a ridge with vertical cusps and a posterior shelf at their base. However, in addition to being much larger than any known traversodont cynodont, Kraterokheirodon also possesses more cusps than any traversodont tooth (6 compared to 2 or 3), and they are arranged parallel to each other in traversodonts unlike the curving row of cusps in Kraterokheirodon. Furthermore, traversodonts possess enamel on the posterior shelf, which Kraterokheirodon lacks.

Due to these differences, as well as the possibility that the features similar to traversodonts could be convergently evolved, rather than shared homologous structures, Irmis and Parker referred Kraterokheirodon to Amniota incertae sedis and suggested it belonged to an as yet unrecognised clade of tetrapods.
