= Petrified Forest National Park =

National park in Arizona, United States

- IUCN category II (national park)
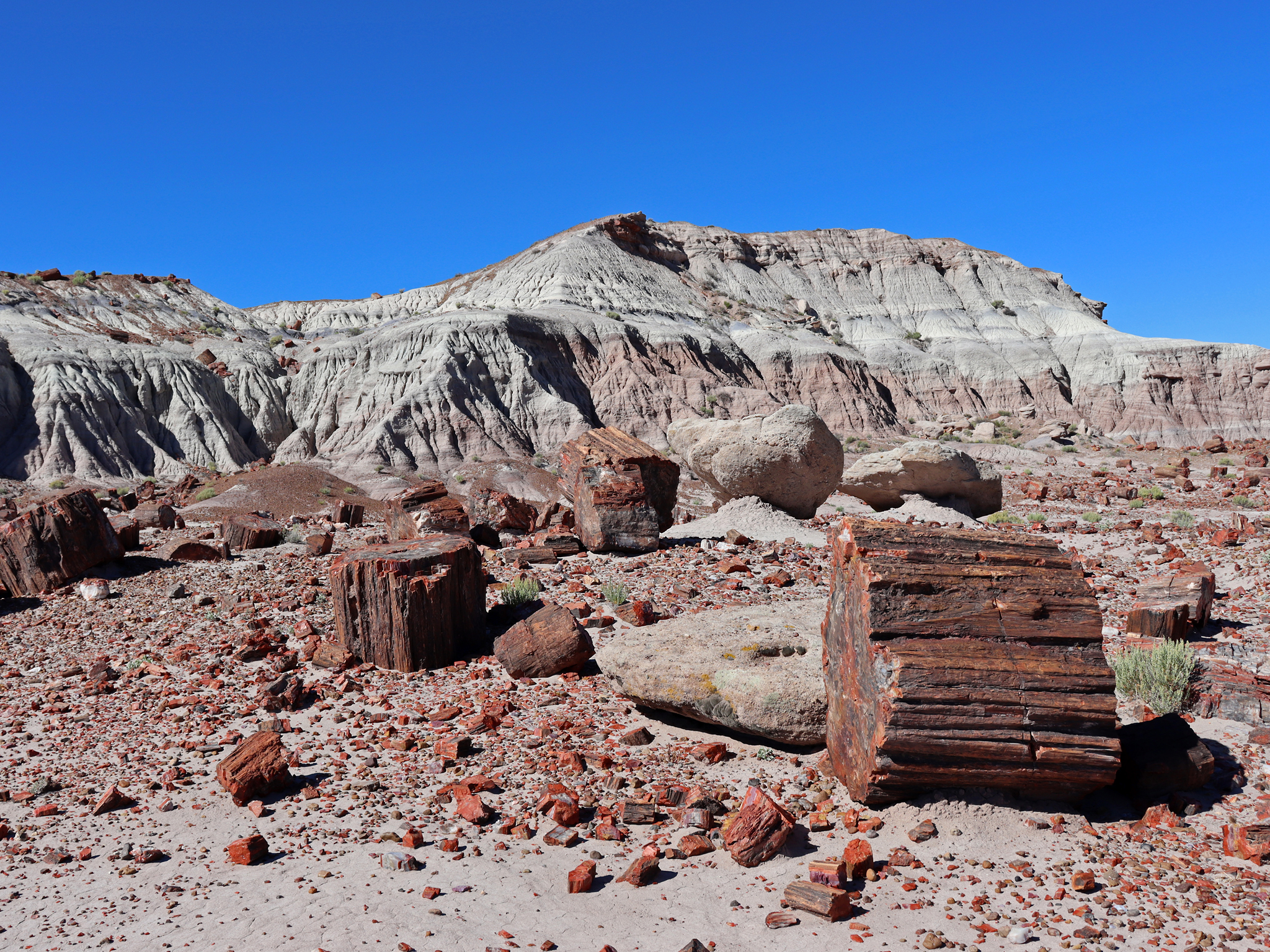
- Jasper Forest at Petrified Forest NP
- Interactive map of Petrified Forest National Park
- Location: Arizona, United States
- Nearest city: Holbrook
- Coordinates: 35°05′17″N 109°48′23″W
- Area: 221,391 acres (895.94 km^{2})
- Elevation: 5,436 ft (1,657 m)
- Established: 1962 (national park); 1906 (national monument)
- Named for: Petrified wood found in the park
- Visitors: 315,951 (in 2025)
- Governing body: National Park Service
- Website: Petrified Forest National Park

Petrified Forest National Park is a national park of the United States in Navajo and Apache counties in northeastern Arizona. Named for its large deposits of petrified wood, the park covers about 346 square miles (900 square kilometers), encompassing semi-desert shrub steppe as well as highly eroded and colorful badlands. The park's headquarters is about 26 miles (42 km) east of Holbrook along Interstate 40 (I-40), which parallels the BNSF Railway's Southern Transcon, the Puerco River, and historic U.S. Route 66, all crossing the park roughly east–west. The site, the northern part of which extends into the Painted Desert, was declared a national monument in 1906 and a national park in 1962. The park received 644,922 recreational visitors in 2018.

Averaging about 5,400 feet (1,600 m) in elevation, the park has a dry windy climate with temperatures that vary from summer highs of about 100 °F (38 °C) to winter lows well below freezing. More than 400 species of plants, dominated by grasses such as bunchgrass, blue grama, and sacaton, are found in the park. Fauna include larger animals such as pronghorns, coyotes, and bobcats; many smaller animals, such as deer mice, snakes, lizards, and seven kinds of amphibians; and more than 200 species of birds, some of which are permanent residents and many of which are migratory. About one third of the park is designated wilderness—50,260 acres (79 sq mi; 203 km^{2}).

The Petrified Forest is known for its fossils, especially fallen trees that lived in the Late Triassic Epoch, about 225 million years ago. The sediments containing the fossil logs are part of the widespread and colorful Chinle Formation, from which the Painted Desert gets its name. Beginning about 60 million years ago, the Colorado Plateau, of which the park is part, was pushed upward by tectonic forces and exposed to increased erosion. All of the park's rock layers above the Chinle, except geologically recent ones found in parts of the park, have been removed by wind and water. In addition to petrified logs, fossils found in the park have included Late Triassic ferns, cycads, ginkgoes, and many other plants as well as fauna including giant reptiles called phytosaurs, large amphibians, and early dinosaurs. Paleontologists have been unearthing and studying the park's fossils since the early 20th century.

The park's earliest human inhabitants arrived 13,000 years ago. These Clovis-era people are the ancestors of Native Americans. By about 2,500 years ago Ancestral Pueblo farmers were growing corn and living in subterranean pit houses in what would become the park. By one-thousand years ago Ancestral Pueblo farmers lived in above-ground, masonry dwellings called pueblos and gathered in large communal buildings called great kivas. By 1450 CE Ancestral Pueblo farmers in the Petrified Forest migrated to join rapidly growing communities on the Hopi Mesas to the northwest and the Pueblo of Zuni to the east–these locations are still home to thousands of descendant community members today. More than 1,000 archeological sites, including petroglyphs, have been discovered in the park. These ancestral places remain important to descendant communities. In the 16th century, Spanish explorers visited the area, and by the mid-19th century a U.S. team had surveyed an east–west route through the area where the park is now located and noted the petrified wood. Later, roads and a railway followed similar routes and gave rise to tourism and, before the park was protected, to large-scale removal of fossils. Theft of petrified wood remains a problem in the 21st century.

== Geography ==
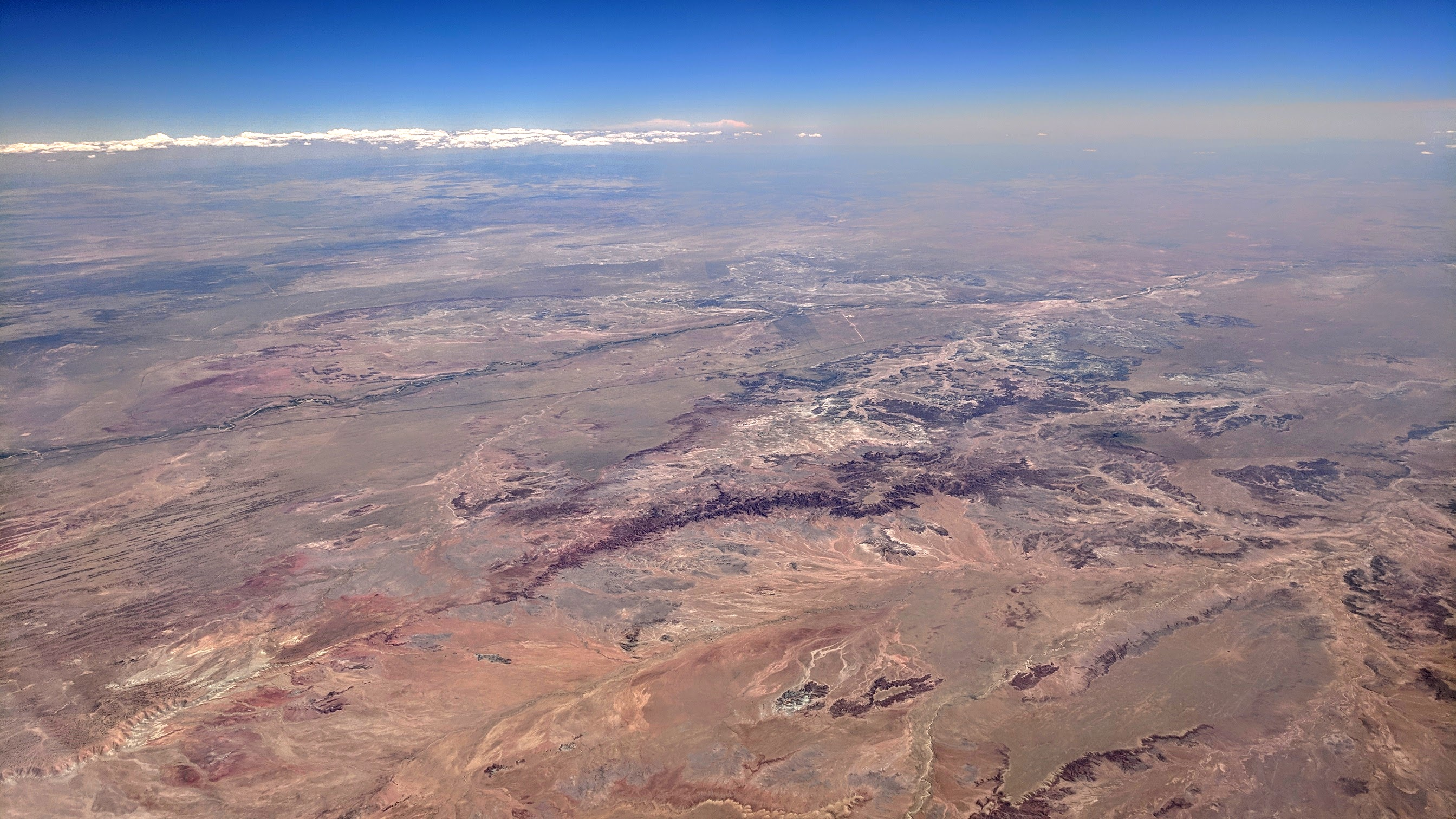
Aerial view looking south from the Navajo Reservation (foreground) across the Painted Desert, the Petrified Forest National Park, and Adamana, Arizona

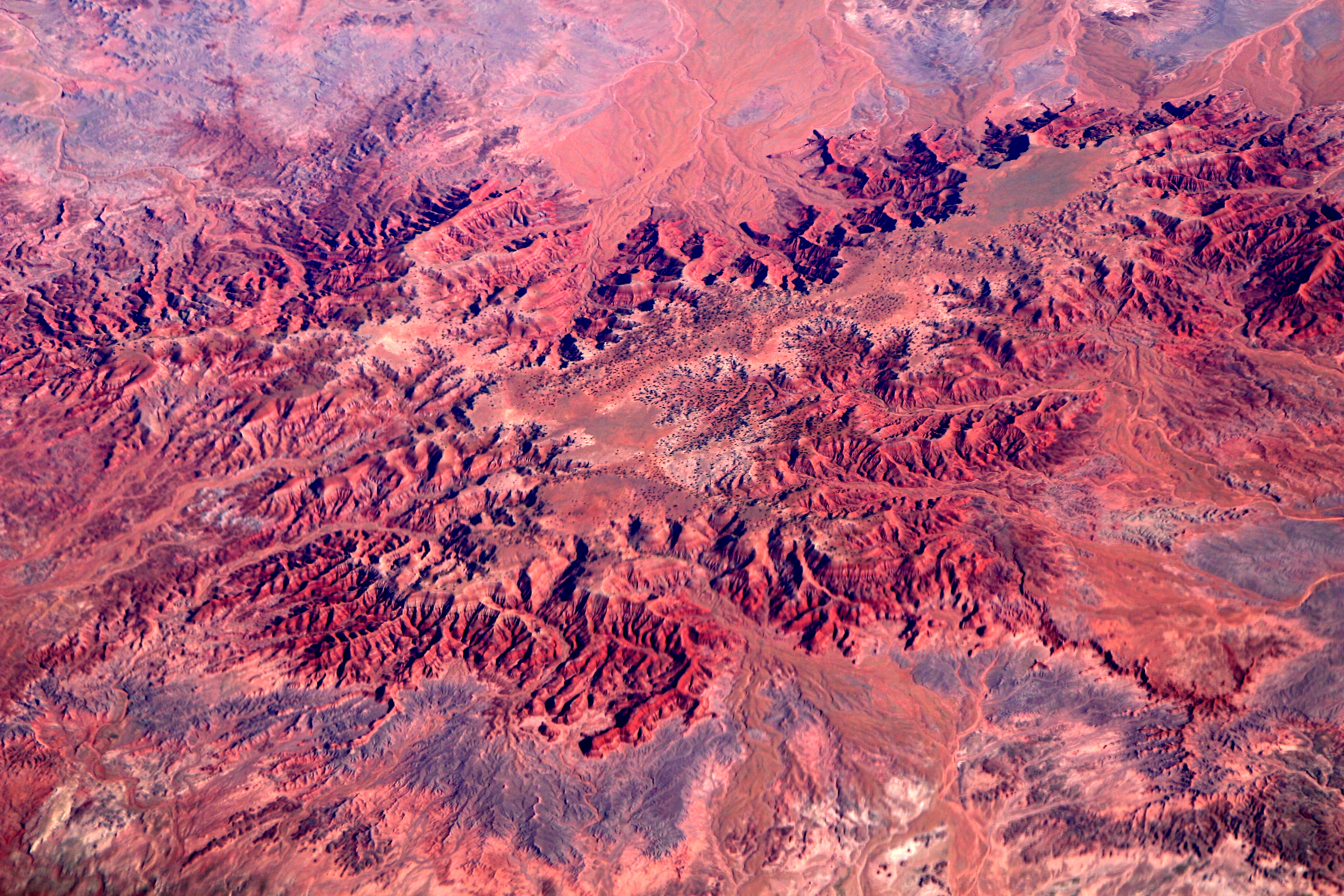
Painted Desert & Petrified Forest National Park, from the window of a commercial flight, 2007

Petrified Forest National Park straddles the border between Apache County and Navajo County in northeastern Arizona. The park is about 30 miles (50 km) long from north to south. Its width varies from a maximum of about 12 miles (20 km) in the north to a minimum of about 1 mile (1.6 km) along a narrow corridor between the north and south, where the park widens again to about 4 to 5 miles (6 to 8 km).

I-40, the former U.S. Route 66, the BNSF Railway, and the Puerco River bisect the park, generally running east–west along a similar route. Adamana, a ghost town, is about 1 mile (1.6 km) west of the park along the BNSF tracks. Holbrook, about 26 miles (40 km) west of park headquarters along I-40, is the nearest city. Bisecting the park north–south is Park Road, which runs between I-40 near park headquarters on the north and U.S. Route 180 on the south. Historic Highway 180, an earlier alignment of the modern route, crosses the southern edge of the park. Like Route 66, it has deteriorated and is closed. Many unpaved maintenance roads, closed to the public, intersect Park Road at various points.

The fee area of the park owned by NPS covers about 230 square miles (600 km^{2}). The Navajo Nation borders the park on the north and northeast. State-owned land, federal land controlled by the Bureau of Land Management, and private land, much of it used for cattle ranching, adjoin the other borders. The park's elevation above sea level varies from a low of 5,340 feet (1,630 m) along the Puerco River to a high of 6,230 feet (1,900 m) at Pilot Rock; the average elevation is about 5,400 feet (1,650 m). The terrain varies from gentle hills and major petrified wood deposits in the south to eroded badlands in the north. Most of the park's intermittent streams—including Lithodendron Wash, Dead Wash, Ninemile Wash, and Dry Wash—empty into the Puerco River. In the southern part of the park, Cottonwood Wash and Jim Camp Wash flow into the Little Colorado River.

== Geology ==
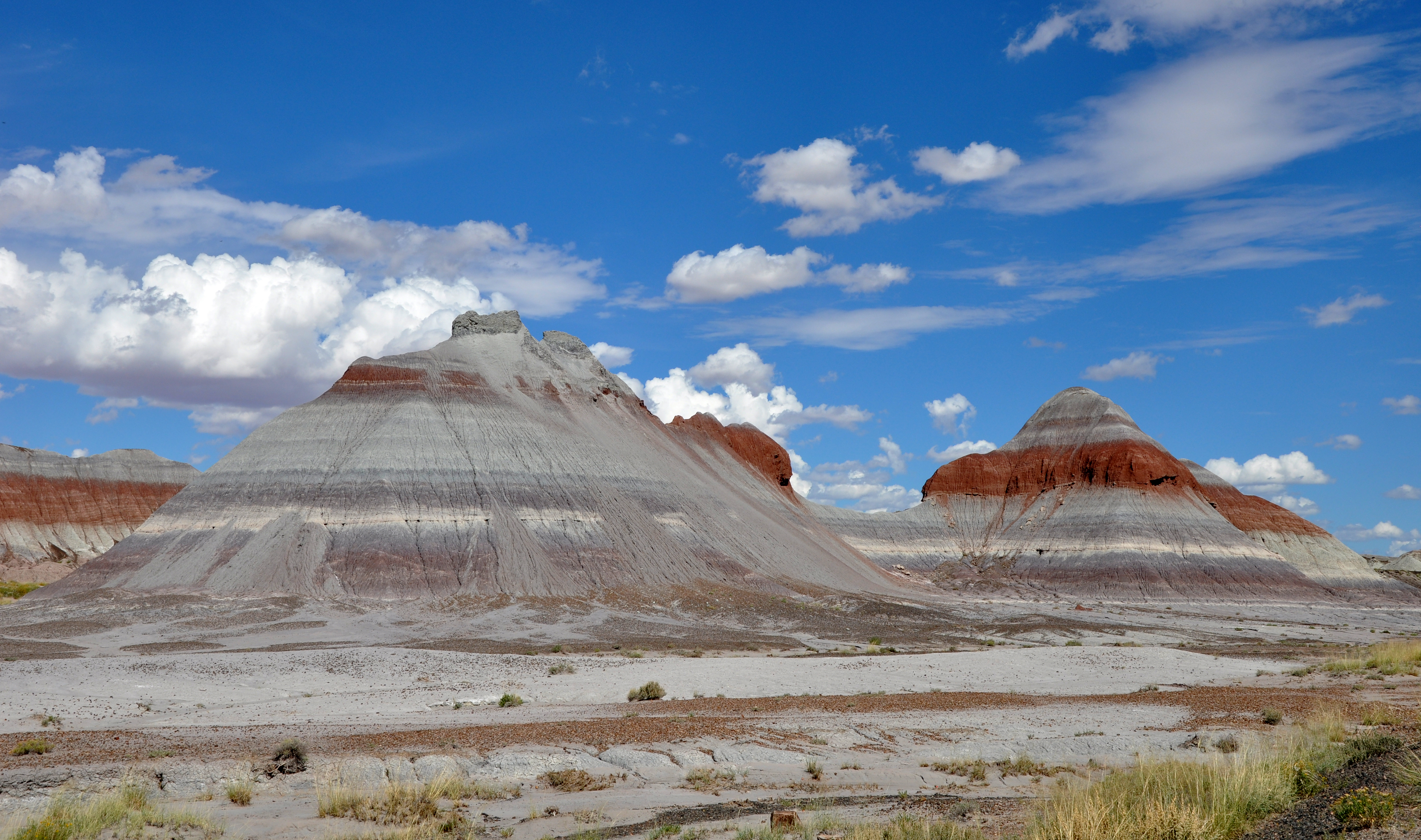
The Tepees in Petrified Forest National Park are within the Blue Mesa Member of the Triassic Chinle Formation

Petrified Forest National Park is known for its fossils, especially of fallen trees that lived in the Late Triassic Epoch of the Mesozoic era, about 225–207 million years ago. During this epoch, the region that is now the park was near the equator on the southwestern edge of the supercontinent Pangaea, and its climate was humid and sub-tropical. What later became northeastern Arizona was a low plain flanked by mountains to the south and southeast and a sea to the west. Streams flowing across the plain from the highlands deposited inorganic sediment and organic matter, including trees as well as other plants and animals that had entered or fallen into the water. Although most organic matter decays rapidly or is eaten by other organisms, some is buried so quickly that it remains intact and may become fossilized. Within the park, the sediments containing the fossil logs for which the park is named are part of the Chinle Formation.

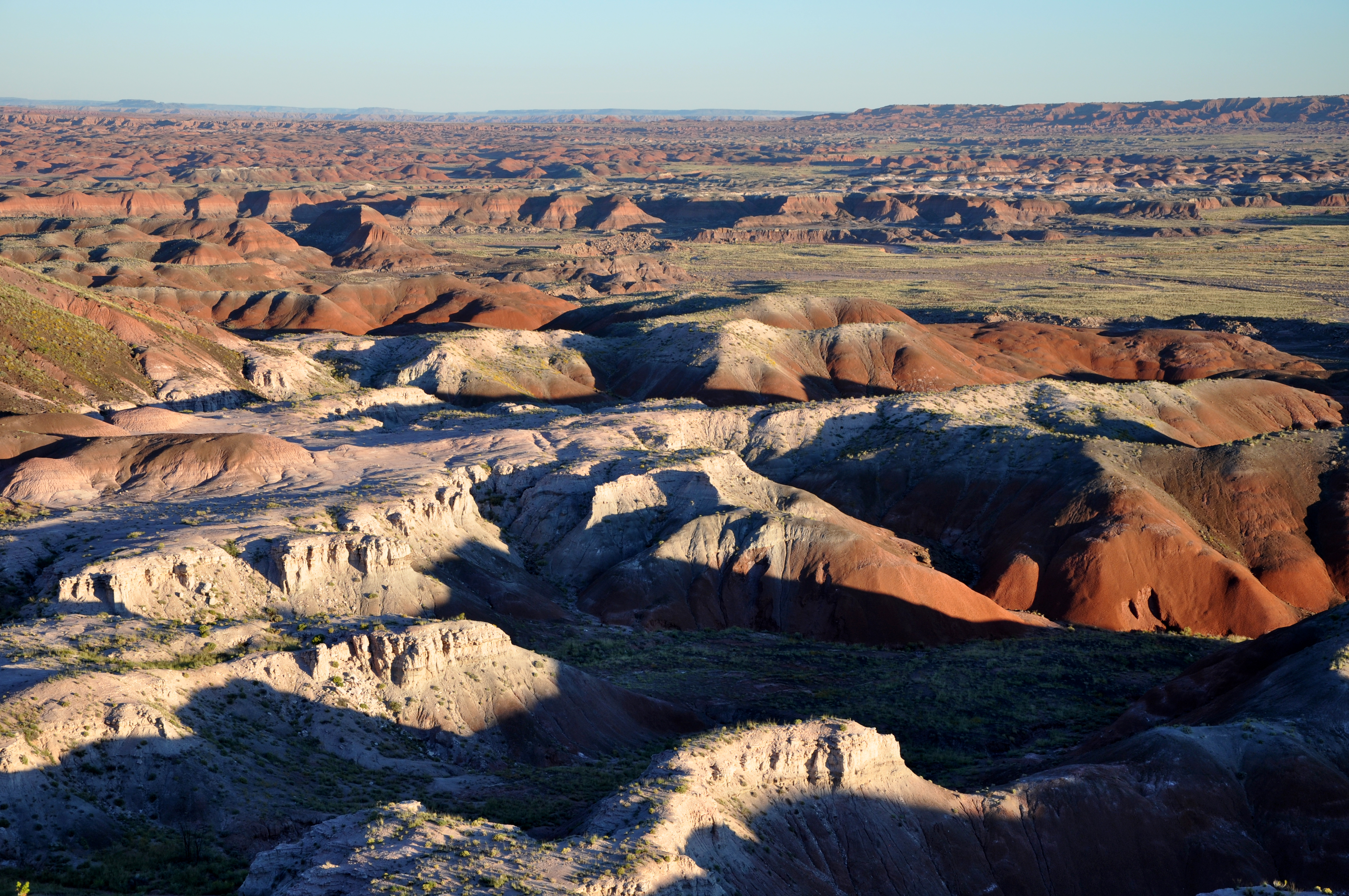
Painted Desert badlands as seen from the rim at Tawa Point

The colorful Chinle, which appears on the surface in many parts of the southwestern United States and from which the Painted Desert gets its name, is up to 800 feet (240 m) thick in the park. It consists of a variety of sedimentary rocks including beds of soft, fine-grained mudstone, siltstone, and claystone—much of which is bentonite—as well as harder sandstone and conglomerate, and limestone. Exposed to wind and water, the Chinle usually erodes differentially into badlands made up of cliffs, gullies, mesas, buttes, and rounded hills. Its bentonite clay, which swells when wet and shrinks while drying, causes surface movement and cracking that discourages plant growth. Lack of plant cover makes the Chinle especially susceptible to weathering.

About 60 million years ago, tectonic movements of the Earth's crust began to uplift the Colorado Plateau, of which the Painted Desert is part. Eventually parts of the plateau rose to 10,000 feet (3,000 m) above sea level. This warping of the Earth's surface led to the gradual and continuing destruction of the plateau by erosion. An unconformity (break in the rock record) of about 200 million years occurs within the park, where erosion has removed all the rock layers above the Chinle except geologically recent ones. The Bidahochi Formation, laid down only 4 to 8 million years ago, rests directly atop the Chinle, and rocks laid down in the Jurassic, Cretaceous, and much of the Tertiary are absent.

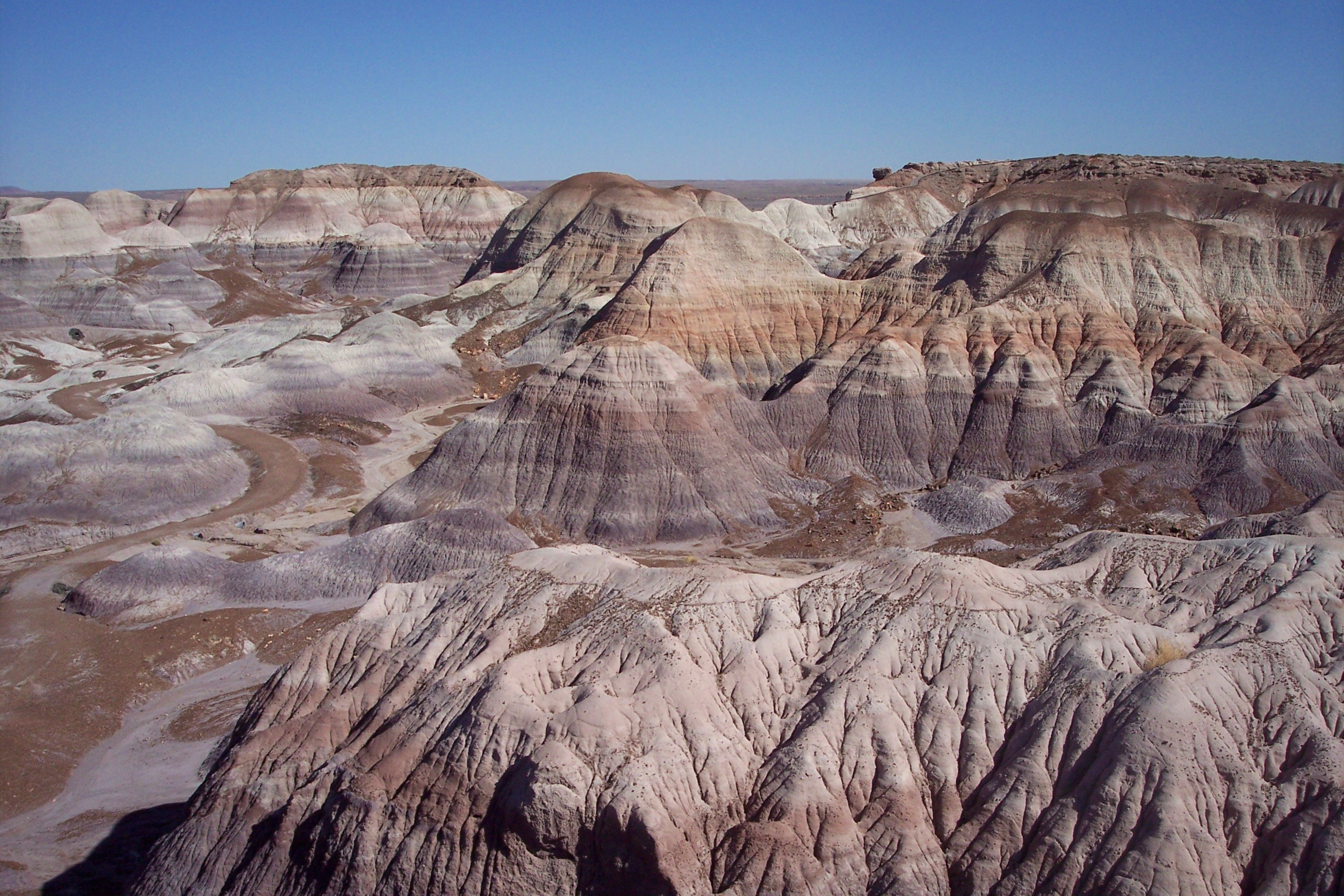
Painted desert and petrified logs seen from Blue Mesa

During the period of the Bidahochi deposition, a large lake basin covered much of northeastern Arizona. The older (lower) layers of the formation consist of fluvial and lacustrine (lake-related) deposits of silt, sand, and clay. The younger (upper) Bidahochi contains ash and lava from volcanoes that erupted nearby and as far away as southwestern Nevada. Although much of the Bidahochi has since eroded, a small part of it outcrops in the northern part of the park—on Pilot Rock in the park's wilderness section and along the rim of the Painted Desert between Pintado and Tawa points. Exposed by erosion of the Bidahochi are volcanic landforms called maars (flat-bottomed, roughly circular volcanic craters of explosive origin). A maar vent can be seen from the Pintado Point lookout.

During the Quaternary Period (2.6 million years ago up to today), deposits of windblown sand and alluvium covered much of the Chinle and Bidahochi. Older dunes range in age from 500,000 years at higher elevations in the northern part of the park to about 10,000 years in sandy drainage areas such as Lithodendron Wash. Stabilized by grasses and other vegetation, young dunes of about 1,000 years old are found throughout the park.

=== Fossils ===
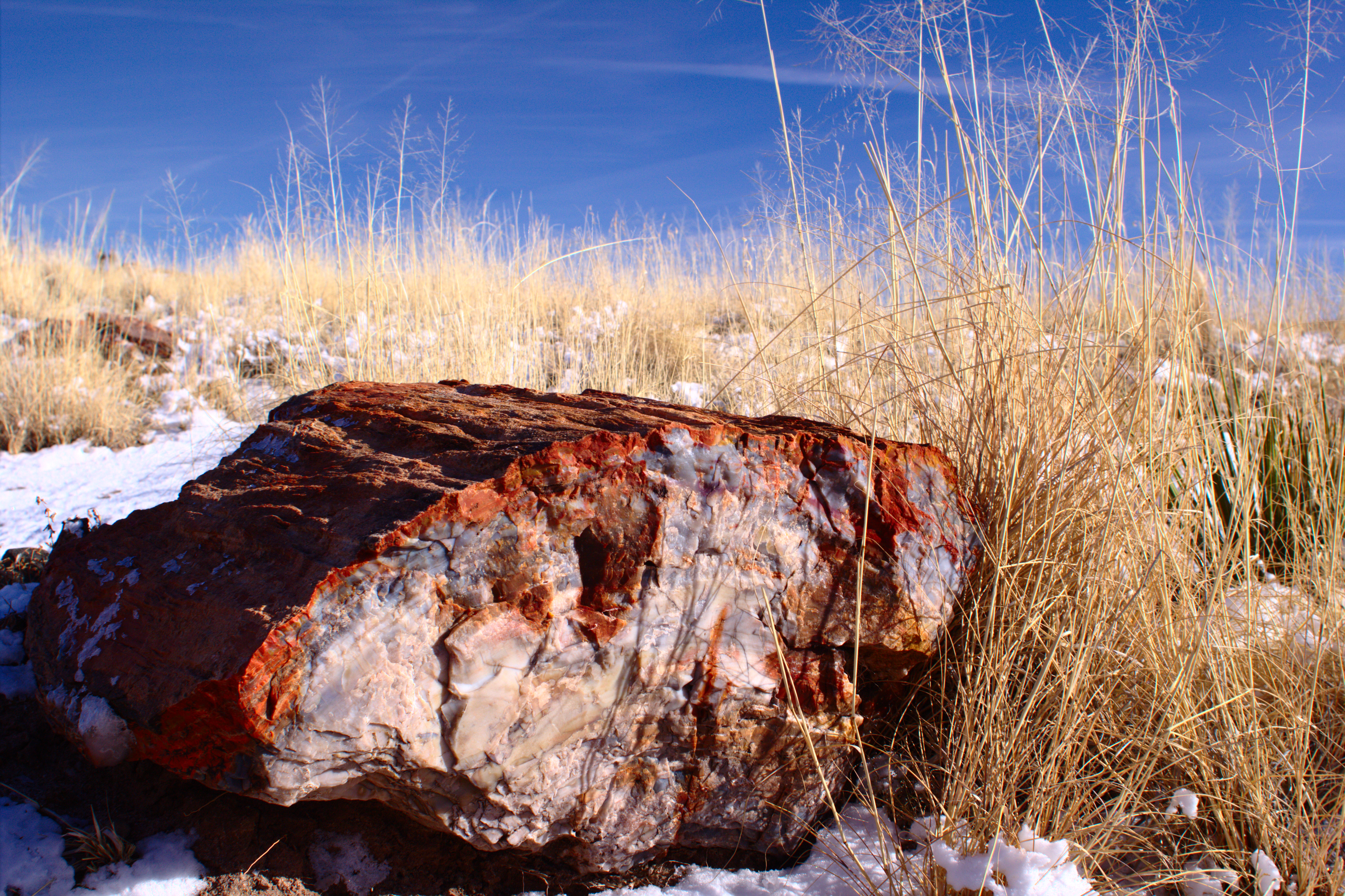
A petrified log in the Petrified Forest

During the Late Triassic, downed trees accumulating in river channels in what became the park were buried periodically by sediment containing volcanic ash. Groundwater dissolved silica (silicon dioxide) from the ash and carried it into the logs, where it formed quartz crystals that gradually replaced the organic matter. Traces of iron oxide and other substances combined with the silica to create varied colors in the petrified wood.

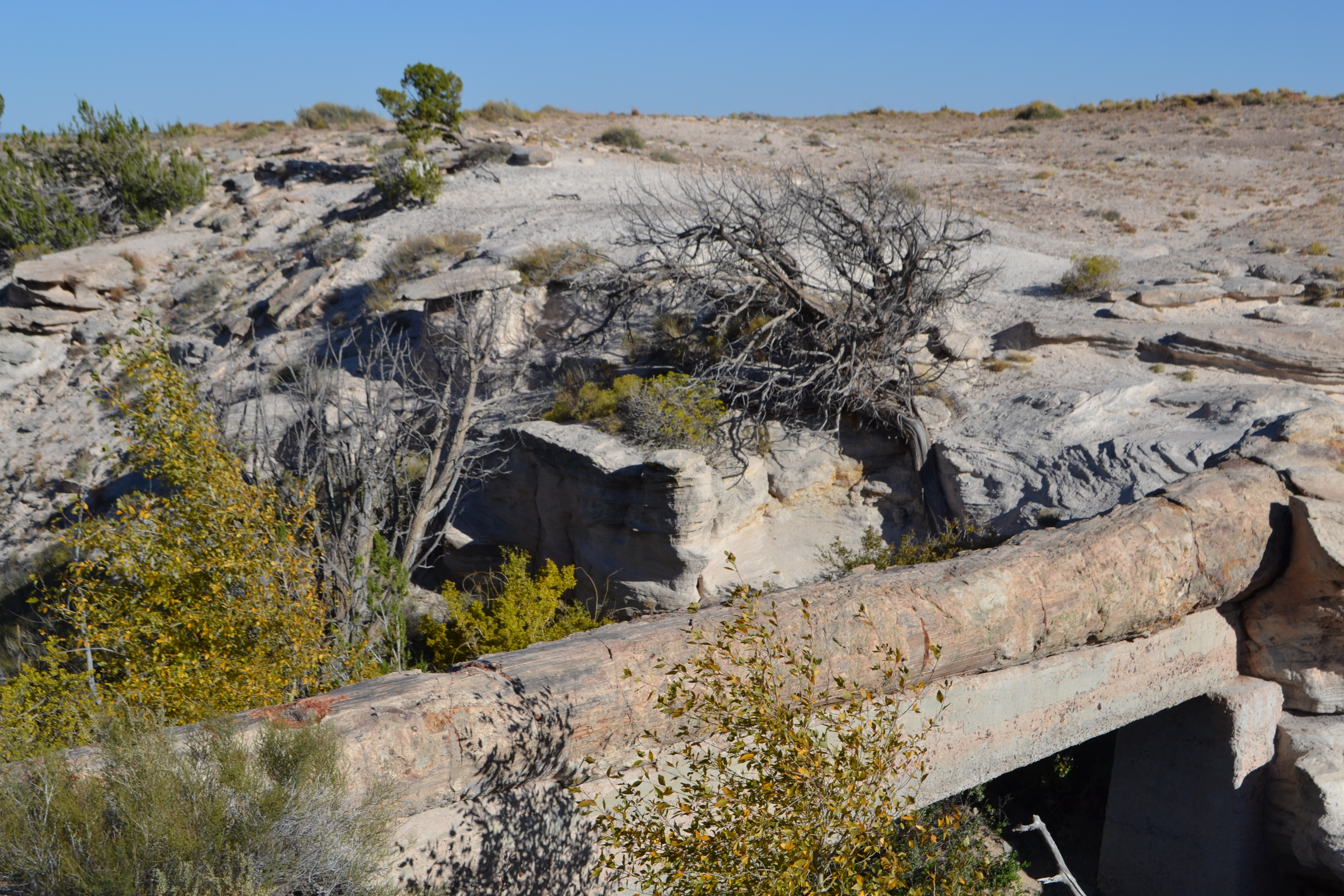
Agate Bridge, a fossilized tree

In Petrified Forest National Park, most of the logs in the park retained their original external form during petrification but lost their internal structure. However, a small fraction of the logs and most of the park's petrified animal bones have cells and other spaces that are mineral-filled but still retain much of their original organic structure. With these permineralized fossils, it is possible to study the cellular make-up of the original organisms with the aid of a microscope. Other organic matter—typically leaves, seeds, pine-cones, pollen grains, spores, small stems, and fish, insect, and animal remains—have been preserved in the park as compression fossils, flattened by the weight of the sediments above until only a thin film remains in the rock.

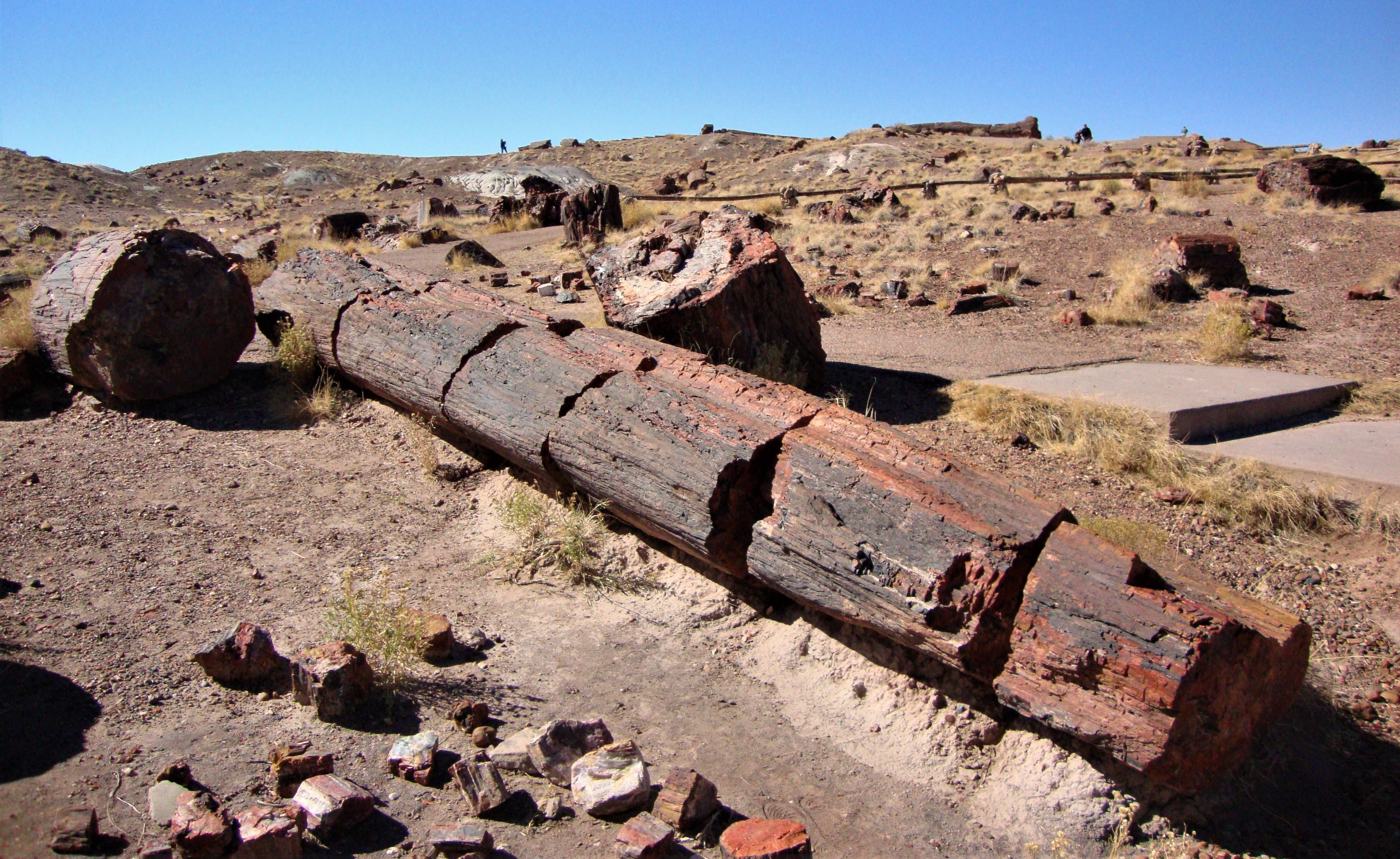
Petrified tree – fractured into segments

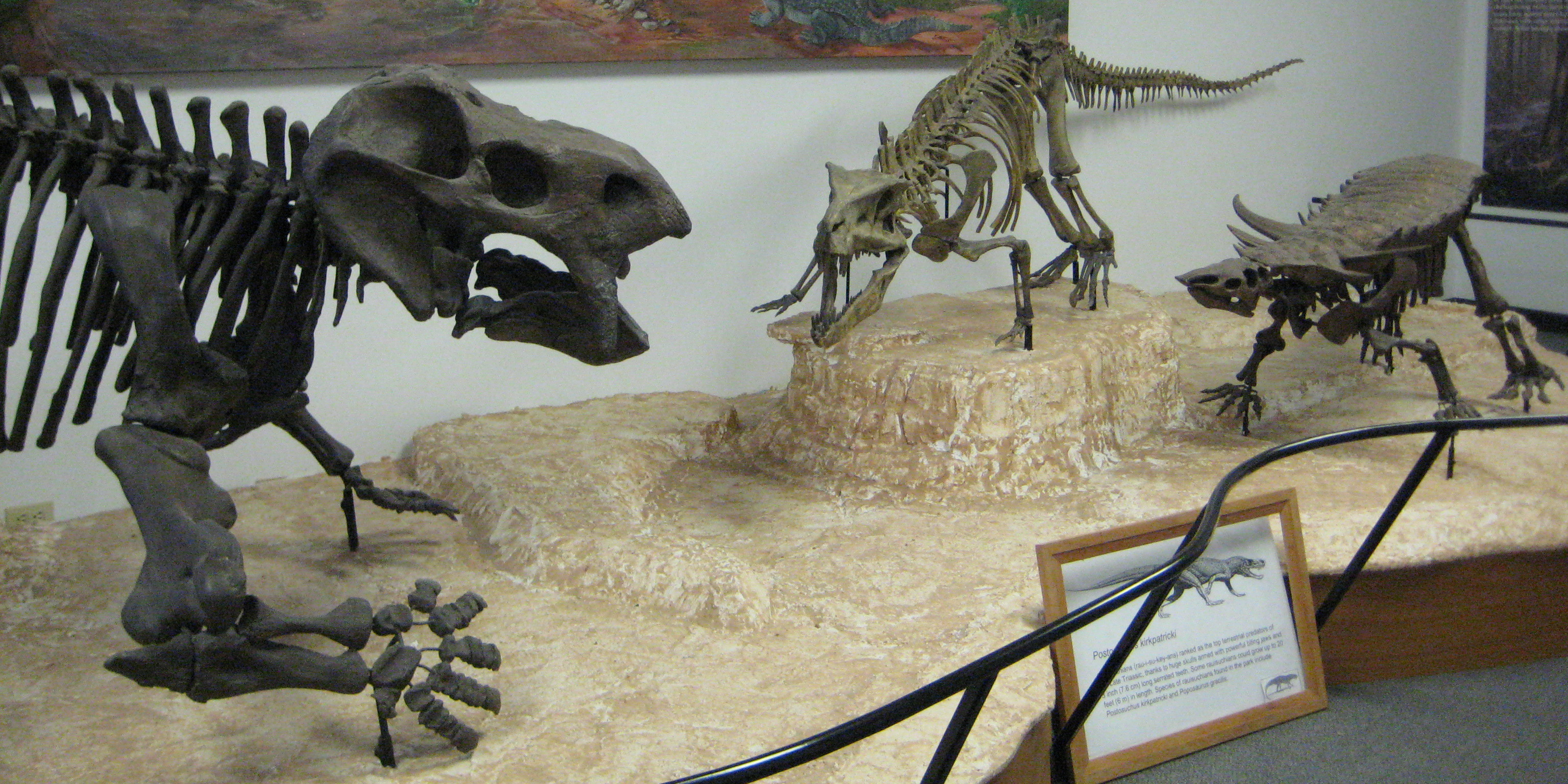
Reconstructed Triassic skeletons found at Petrified Forest

Much of the park's petrified wood is from Araucarioxylon arizonicum, an extinct conifer tree, while some found in the northern part of the park is from Woodworthia arizonica and Schilderia adamanica trees. At least nine species of fossil trees from the park have been identified; all are extinct. The park has many other kinds of fossils besides trees. The Chinle, considered to be one of the richest Late Triassic fossil-plant deposits in the world, contains more than 200 fossil plant taxa. Plant groups represented in the park include lycophytes, ferns, cycads, conifers, ginkgoes, as well as unclassified forms. The park has also produced one of the most diverse assemblages of fossil vertebrates from the Late Triassic. Among the groups represented are early theropod dinosaurs, crocodile-line archosaurs, temnospondyl amphibians, lissamphibians, non-archosauromorph diapsids, and other dinosauromorphs and archosauromorphs. Dicynodonts are extremely rare despite being abundantly represented at the Placerias Quarry near St. Johns. Fossil invertebrates include freshwater snails and clams. The oldest fossil crayfish, Enoploclytia porteri, was also described from the park, although it is not considered a crayfish proper (instead placed in Erymidae).

New animal species that were first identified from localities within the current park boundaries, some of which remain known only from the park, are listed below.

Clade	Taxon	Authority	Publication year
Shuvosauridae	Sonselasuchus cedrus	Armour Smith & Sidor	2026
Tanystropheidae	Akidostropheus oligos	Schubul, Marsh, & Kligman	2025
Gymnophionomorpha	Funcusvermis gilmorei	Kligman, Gee, Marsh, Nesbitt, Smith, Parker, & Stocker	2023
Aetosauria	Kryphioparma caerula	Reyes, Parker & Heckert	2023
Allokotosauria	Puercosuchus traverorum	Marsh, Parker, Nesbitt, Kligman, & Stocker	2022
Cynodontia	Kataigidodon venetus	Kligman, Marsh, Sues, & Sidor	2020
Drepanosauromorpha	Skybalonyx skapter	Jenkins, Pritchard, Marsh, Kligman, Sidor & Reed	2020
Allokotosauria	Trilophosaurus phasmalophos	Kligman, Marsh, Nesbitt, Parker, Stocker	2020
Drepanosauromorpha	Ancistronychus paradoxus	Gonçalves & Sidor	2019
Aetosauria	Scutarx deltatylus	Parker	2016
Phytosauria	Protome batalaria	Stocker	2012
Aetosauria	Adamanasuchus eisenhardtae	Lucas, Hunt, & Spielmann	2007
Phytosauria	Pseudopalatus jablonskiae	Parker & Irmis	2006
Allokotosauria	Trilophosaurus dornurum	Mueller & Parker	2006
Tetrapoda incertae sedis	Kraterokheirodon colberti	Irmis & Parker	2005
Reptilia incertae sedis	Acallosuchus rectori	Long & Murry	1995
Dinosauria	Chindesaurus bryansmalli	Long & Murry	1995
Proterochampsia	Vancleavea campi	Long & Murry	1995
Phytosauria	Machaeroprosopus mcauleyi	Ballew	1989
Decapoda	Enoploclytia porteri	Miller & Ash	1988
Phytosauria	Smilosuchus adamanensis	Camp	1930
Phytosauria	Machaeroprosopus pristinus	Mehl	1928

== Climate ==
According to the Köppen climate classification system, Petrified Forest National Park has a cold semi-arid climate (BSk). According to the United States Department of Agriculture, the plant hardiness zone at the Painted Desert Visitor Center 5,764 feet (1,757 m) is 7a with an average annual extreme minimum temperature of 3.1 °F (−16.1 °C).

Winter winds can reach 60 miles per hour (97 km/h). Summer breezes are lighter, but the 10-mile-per-hour (16 km/h) average wind causes frequent sandstorms and dust devils, some of which reach altitudes of several thousand feet.

Rain is heaviest from July through September, when 42 percent of the park's annual average precipitation falls. August is the wettest month. At an elevation of more than 5,000 feet (1,500 m), Petrified Forest National Park has a chance of light snow from October through March, although snow cover rarely persists. The annual average relative humidity of the area is below 50 percent and at times less than 15 percent.

Climate data for Petrified Forest National Park, Arizona, 1991–2020 normals, extremes 1931–present
Month	Jan	Feb	Mar	Apr	May	Jun	Jul	Aug	Sep	Oct	Nov	Dec	Year
Record high °F (°C)	74 (23)	77 (25)	88 (31)	92 (33)	99 (37)	107 (42)	105 (41)	103 (39)	99 (37)	92 (33)	83 (28)	72 (22)	107 (42)
Mean maximum °F (°C)	62.3 (16.8)	68.6 (20.3)	76.3 (24.6)	83.4 (28.6)	91.6 (33.1)	99.8 (37.7)	100.8 (38.2)	97.5 (36.4)	92.9 (33.8)	85.6 (29.8)	74.3 (23.5)	64.1 (17.8)	101.9 (38.8)
Mean daily maximum °F (°C)	50.0 (10.0)	56.4 (13.6)	64.5 (18.1)	72.1 (22.3)	80.8 (27.1)	91.4 (33.0)	93.3 (34.1)	90.5 (32.5)	84.9 (29.4)	73.9 (23.3)	60.9 (16.1)	49.6 (9.8)	72.4 (22.4)
Daily mean °F (°C)	35.6 (2.0)	40.3 (4.6)	47.1 (8.4)	53.8 (12.1)	62.2 (16.8)	72.1 (22.3)	76.7 (24.8)	74.9 (23.8)	68.4 (20.2)	56.6 (13.7)	44.5 (6.9)	35.1 (1.7)	55.6 (13.1)
Mean daily minimum °F (°C)	21.1 (−6.1)	24.3 (−4.3)	29.7 (−1.3)	35.5 (1.9)	43.5 (6.4)	52.7 (11.5)	60.1 (15.6)	59.3 (15.2)	51.9 (11.1)	39.3 (4.1)	28.1 (−2.2)	20.7 (−6.3)	38.9 (3.8)
Mean minimum °F (°C)	5.8 (−14.6)	10.6 (−11.9)	15.6 (−9.1)	23.5 (−4.7)	31.5 (−0.3)	41.8 (5.4)	51.5 (10.8)	52.1 (11.2)	39.3 (4.1)	24.8 (−4.0)	13.8 (−10.1)	5.7 (−14.6)	1.6 (−16.9)
Record low °F (°C)	−27 (−33)	−8 (−22)	2 (−17)	12 (−11)	19 (−7)	31 (−1)	42 (6)	41 (5)	29 (−2)	8 (−13)	−13 (−25)	−18 (−28)	−27 (−33)
Average precipitation inches (mm)	0.59 (15)	0.64 (16)	0.65 (17)	0.40 (10)	0.43 (11)	0.24 (6.1)	1.72 (44)	1.58 (40)	1.02 (26)	0.89 (23)	0.67 (17)	0.78 (20)	9.61 (245.1)
Average snowfall inches (cm)	0.8 (2.0)	0.6 (1.5)	0.8 (2.0)	0.0 (0.0)	0.0 (0.0)	0.0 (0.0)	0.0 (0.0)	0.0 (0.0)	0.0 (0.0)	0.2 (0.51)	0.3 (0.76)	0.8 (2.0)	3.5 (8.77)
Average precipitation days (≥ 0.01 in)	5.7	4.8	4.7	3.3	3.7	2.2	8.8	9.4	5.2	4.9	3.9	5.3	61.9
Average snowy days (≥ 0.1 in)	0.5	0.4	0.3	0.0	0.0	0.0	0.0	0.0	0.0	0.1	0.1	0.7	2.1
Source 1: NOAA
Source 2: National Weather Service

== History ==
=== Pre-United States ===
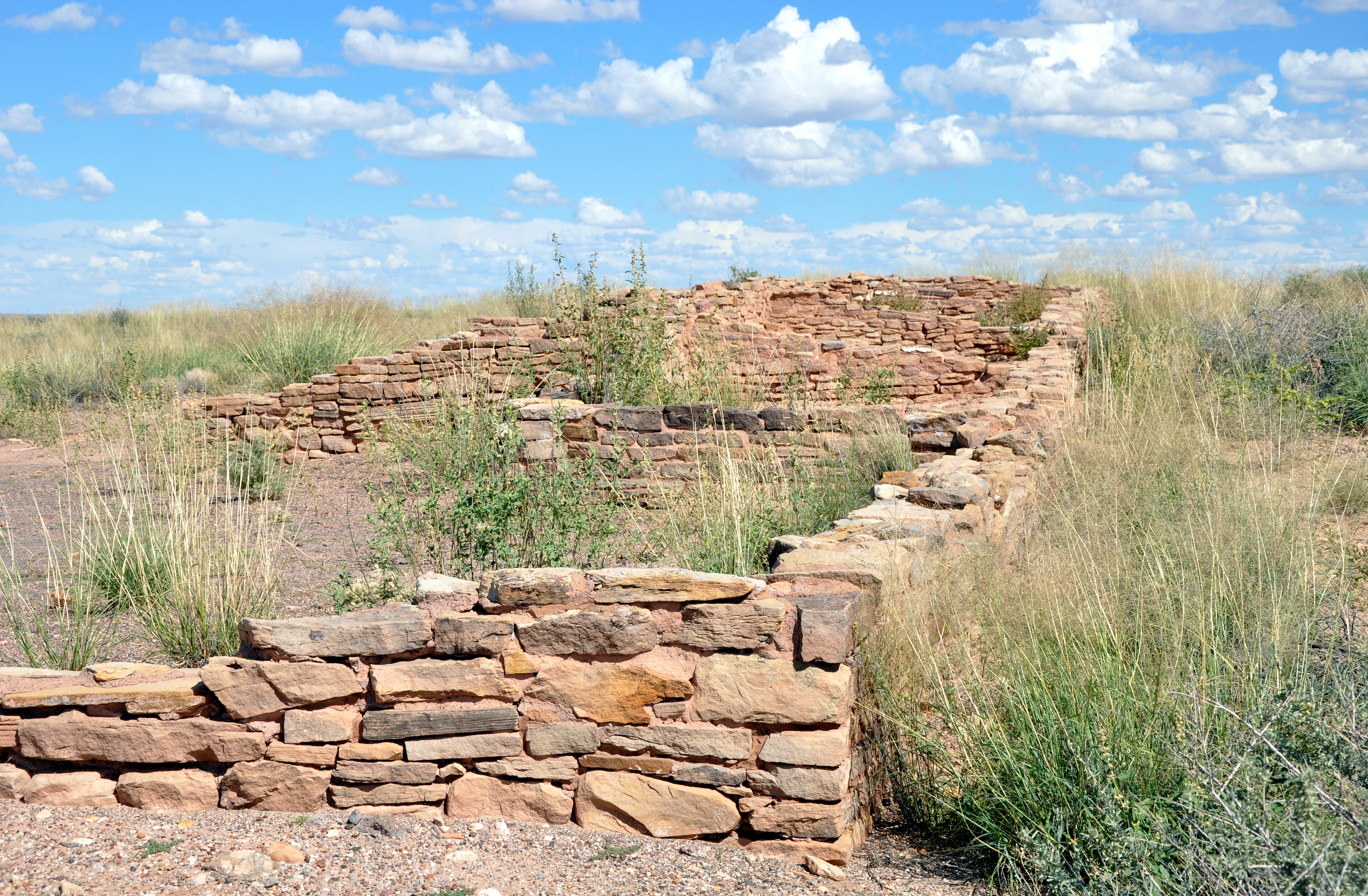
Ruins at Puerco Pueblo in 2010

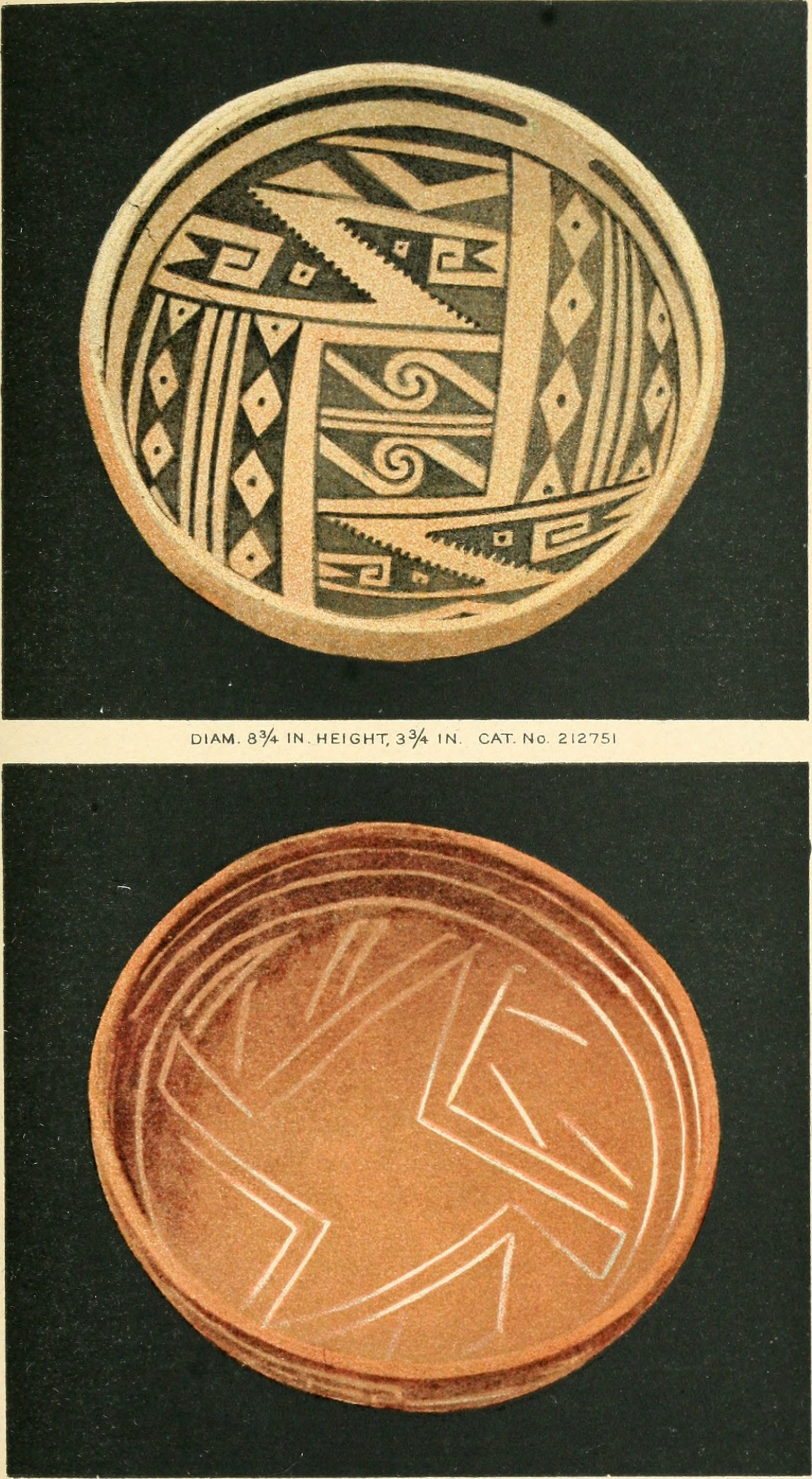
Bowls, Stone Axe Ruin

More than 1,200 archeological sites have been found inside the boundaries of Petrified Forest National Park. Evidence suggests that the earliest inhabitants of the park arrived over 12,000 years ago. Clovis and Folsom-type spear points made from petrified wood are among the earliest artifacts of Paleoindians found in the park. Between 8000 and 1000 BCE, the Archaic Period, nomadic groups established seasonal camps in the Petrified Forest from which they hunted game such as rabbits, pronghorn antelope, and deer and harvested seeds from Indian ricegrass and other wild plants. By at least 1000 BCE and through the Basketmaker II period (400 BCE–500 CE)Ancestral Puebloan farmers began to grow corn. Between 200–500 CE population size grew rapidly. Many families built houses in the Petrified Forest and for the first time began to stay there year-round.

During the Basketmaker III period, 500–700 CE, families occupied shallow subterranean pit structures, at first on mesas or other vantage points and later at the base of bluffs and in lowlands, where the soil was better. Settlement patterns shifted and population size grew during the Pueblo I era between 700 and 900 CE and for the first time large groups of families aggregated together and formed large villages. During this period, each household built large well-insulated subterranean residential pit structures to keep warm during the cold winter months and several adjacent above ground rooms made from stone and jacal similar to adobe—used for food storage and daily activities during the warmer months. During the early Pueblo II period (900–1050 CE) Ancestral Pueblo farmers began constructing above-ground masonry architecture (for example Agate House, a small masonry structure built from petrified wood that is open to the public) signaling a greater degree of residential permanence. During the Late Pueblo II and Early Pueblo III periods 1050–1225 local population size grew rapidly. Similar to much of the Ancestral Pueblo world, population density increased rapidly at this time and nearly 1,000 sites dating to this period have been identified in the park at a wide variety of locations—at the mouths of washes, near seeps, and on moisture-holding sand dunes.

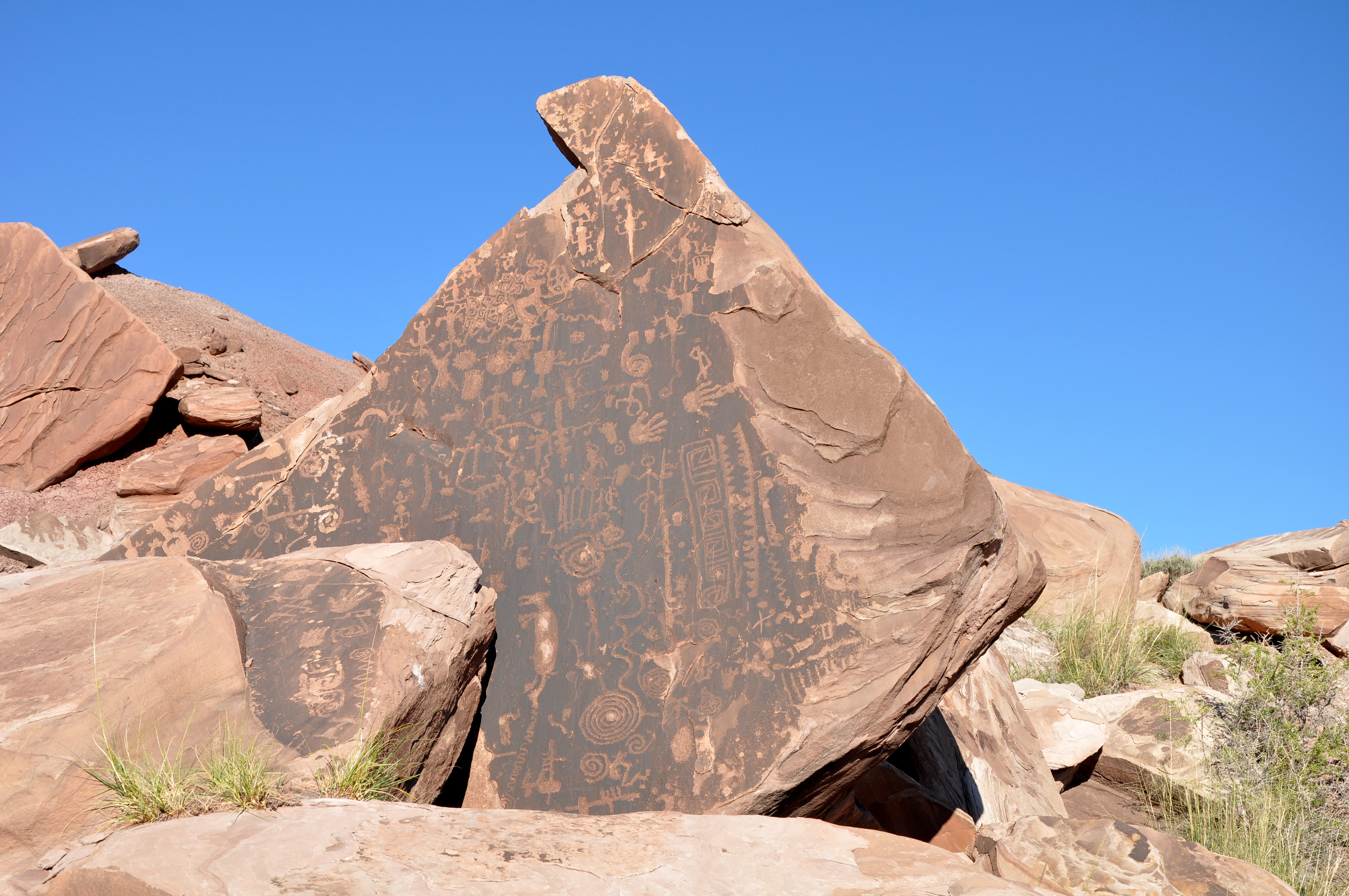
Petroglyphs pecked into desert varnish in Petrified Forest National Park

Between 1250 and 1450 CE Ancestral Pueblo families gathered into large apartment building-like masonry structures (also known as pueblos) with several hundred people living together in close quarters. These large villages were often located near important water sources. Ancestral Pueblo people constructed more than two of these large pueblos, one called Stone Axe, about 0.5 miles (0.8 km) east of the park, and the other at Puerco Pueblo, which overlooks the Puerco River near the middle of the park. There they built roughly 200 rooms around an open plaza. Some rooms had no windows or doors and could be entered by climbing a ladder and descending through a hole in the roof. At its peak, perhaps 200 people lived in this pueblo. Over time, however, Ancestral Pueblo families undertook migrations and joined rapidly growing towns on the Hopi Mesas in Northern Arizona and at the Pueblo of Zuni in northern New Mexico, where the descendants of the ancient Petrified Forest farmers still live today. Some researchers have argued that a persistently dry climate led to out-migration, and the last residents left Puerco Pueblo in about 1380 CE.

At Puerco Pueblo and many other sites within the park, petroglyphs—images, symbols, or designs—have been scratched, pecked, carved, or incised on rock surfaces, often on a patina known as desert varnish. Most of the petroglyphs in Petrified Forest National Park are thought to be between 650 and 2,000 years old.

From the 16th through the 18th centuries, explorers looking for routes between Spanish colonies along the Rio Grande to the southeast and other Spanish colonies on the Pacific coast to the west passed near or through the area, which they called El Desierto Pintado, the Painted Desert. However, the park's oldest Spanish inscriptions, left by descendants of the region's early Spanish colonists, date only to the late 19th century.

=== United States ===
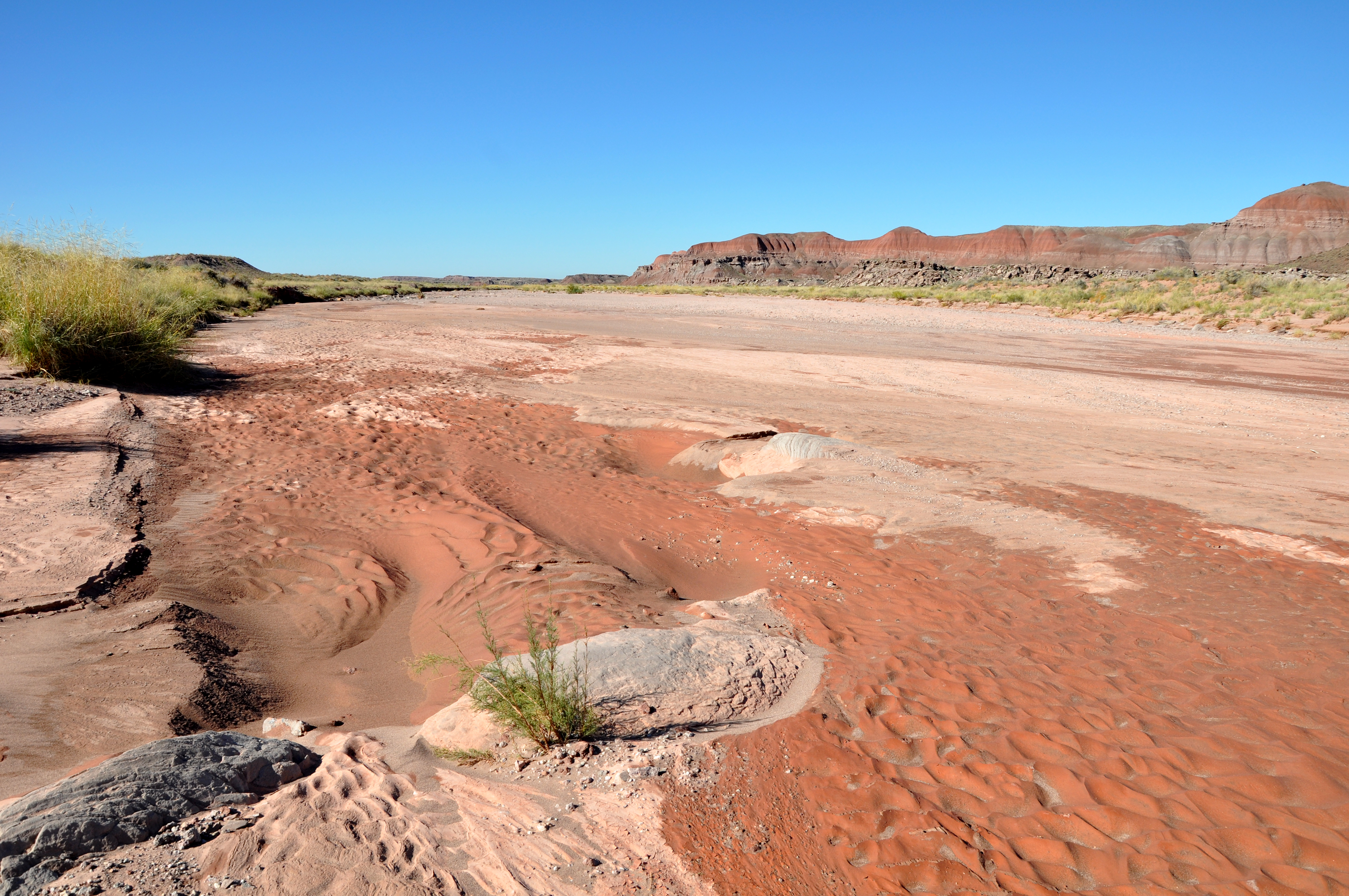
Lithodendron Wash in the designated wilderness in the north part of the park. Amiel Whipple surveyed along the wash in 1853.

After the Southwest became part of the U.S., explorers continued to look for good east–west routes along the 35th parallel. In 1853, a crew led by U.S. Army Lieutenant Amiel Whipple surveyed along a sandy wash in the northern part of the Petrified Forest. So impressed was Whipple by the petrified wood along the banks of the arroyo that he named it Lithodendron Creek (Stone Tree Creek). Geologist Jules Marcou, a member of the Whipple expedition, observed that the petrified trees were from the Triassic.

A slightly later route along the parallel was a wagon road, built between 1857 and 1860, that involved experimental use of camels as transport. In the late 19th century, settlers and private stagecoach companies followed similar east–west routes. Homesteaders who stayed in the area developed cattle ranches on the grasslands, and cattle grazed in the Petrified Forest until the mid-20th century.

Also close to the 35th parallel was the Atlantic and Pacific Railroad. Its opening in the early 1880s led to the founding of towns like Holbrook and Adamana. Visitors could stop at the Adamana train station, book a hotel room, and take a tour of what was then called the Chalcedony Forest. Over the years, the line changed hands, becoming the Atchison, Topeka and Santa Fe Railway, and then the BNSF. More than 60 BNSF trains, mostly carrying freight, pass through the park every day. U.S. Route 66, a former transcontinental auto highway developed in 1926 from part of the National Old Trails Road, ran parallel to the railroad tracks until it was decommissioned in 1985. The park has preserved within its boundaries a small grassy section of the road. Interstate 40, which crosses the park, replaced the older highway.

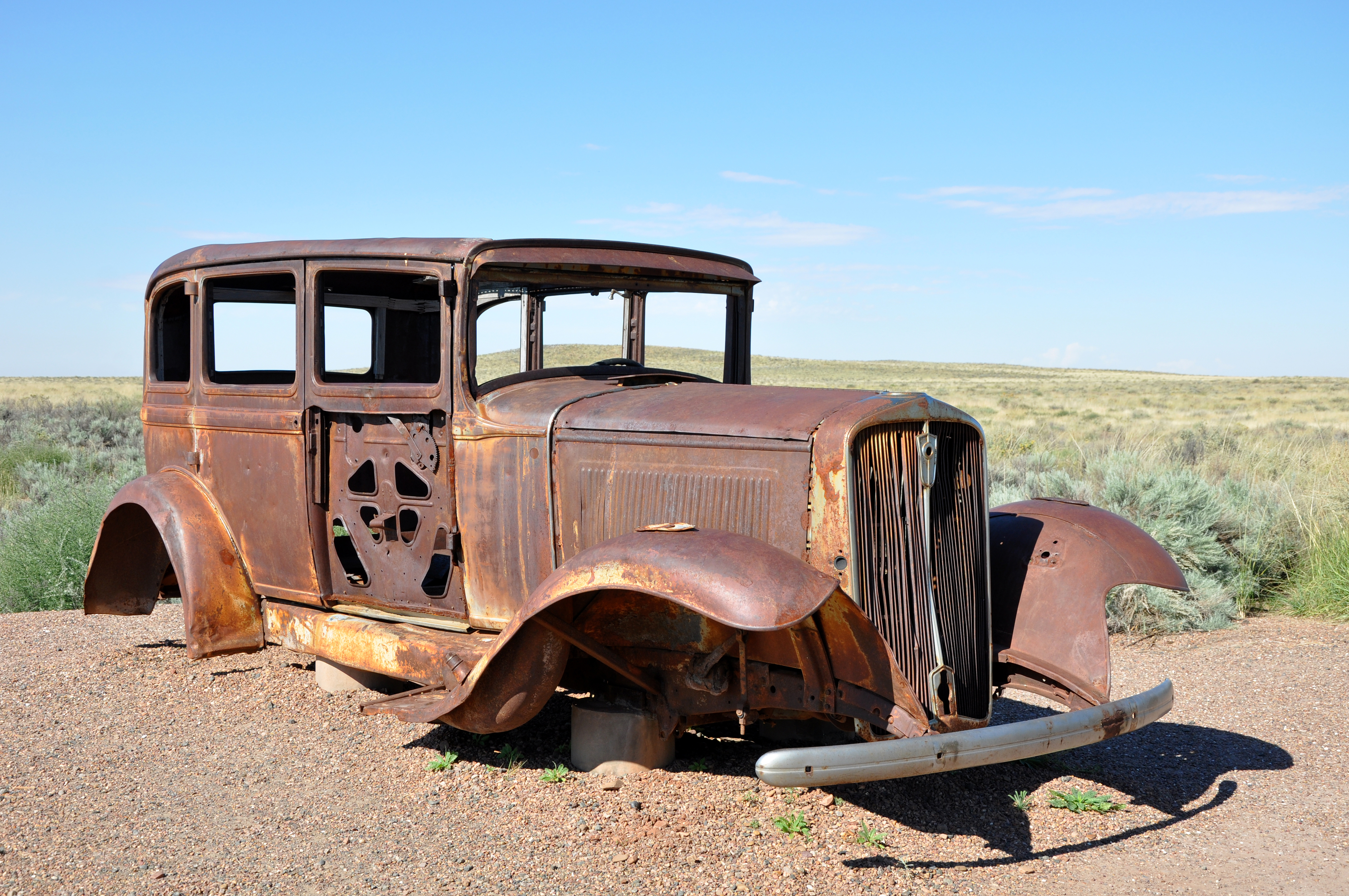
Exhibit commemorating U.S. Route 66, a historic transcontinental highway that passed through the park

Increasing tourist and commercial interest in petrified wood during the late 19th century began to alarm residents of the region. In 1895, the Arizona Territorial Legislature asked the U.S. Congress to create a petrified forest national park. Although this first attempt failed, in 1906 the Antiquities Act signed by President Theodore Roosevelt was used to create the Petrified Forest National Monument as the second national monument. Between 1934 and 1942, the federal Civilian Conservation Corps built road, trails, and structures in the monument, and the government acquired additional land in the Painted Desert section. The monument became a national park in 1962. Six years after the signing of the Wilderness Act in 1964 by President Lyndon B. Johnson, wilderness areas (where human activity is limited), were designated in the park. In 2004, President George W. Bush signed a bill authorizing the eventual expansion of the park from 93,353 acres (about 146 mi^{2} or 378 km^{2}) to 218,533 acres (about 341 mi^{2} or 884 km^{2}). Theft of petrified wood is still a problem. Despite a guard force of seven National Park Service rangers, fences, warning signs, and the threat of a $325 fine, an estimated 12 short tons (11,000 kg) of the fossil wood is stolen from the Petrified Forest every year. Some of the fossil wood is returned by visitors who feel guilty about their actions, but cannot be put back into the park as it's not clear exactly where it came from. As such, park rangers place it in The Conscience Pile.

Jessee Walter Fewkes, the first archeologist to visit Puerco Ruin, predicted in the late 19th century that it would yield many artifacts. Conservationist John Muir conducted the first excavations of the ruin in 1905–06. Although he did not publish his findings, he urged the federal government to preserve Petrified Forest. Professional archeological work in the park began in the early 20th century when Walter Hough conducted excavations at Puerco Ruin and other sites. In the 1930s, the Civil Works Administration funded research in the park by archeologists H.P. Mera and C.B. Cosgrove. A National Park Service resurvey of the Petrified Forest in the early 1940s identified most of the large sites with stone ruins, and subsequent surveys since 1978 have identified a total of more than 600 artifact sites, many of them small.

The earliest paleontological exploration of the region that is now the park was made in 1899 by paleobotanist Lester Ward, material of which is now deposited in the Smithsonian Institution. Muir also collected some fossil material, which is now deposited at the University of California Museum of Paleontology. In 1919, a phytosaur skull was discovered near Blue Mesa in the Petrified Forest by Ynez Mexia and sent to the Museum of Paleontology in Berkeley. In 1921, Annie Alexander, founder of the museum, visited Blue Mesa to collect more of the phytosaur and other specimens; this led to further excavations by paleontologist Charles Camp. Camp was the most prolific collector in the early 20th century, but collections were also made by Maurice Mehl (University of Missouri), Edwin Colbert (American Museum of Natural History), and park naturalists like Myrl Walker. In the latter half of the 20th century, the park was inventoried by staff at the Museum of Northern Arizona (Richard Cifelli, Will Downs), with renewed collection made by researchers from Berkeley (Robert Long, Kevin Padian), the University of Chicago (Michael Parrish), the Field Museum of Natural History (John Bolt), and Yale University (Paul Olsen). Since then, more than 300 fossil sites have been documented in the park. Research in paleontology and archeology continues at the park in the 21st century.

== Biology ==
=== Flora ===
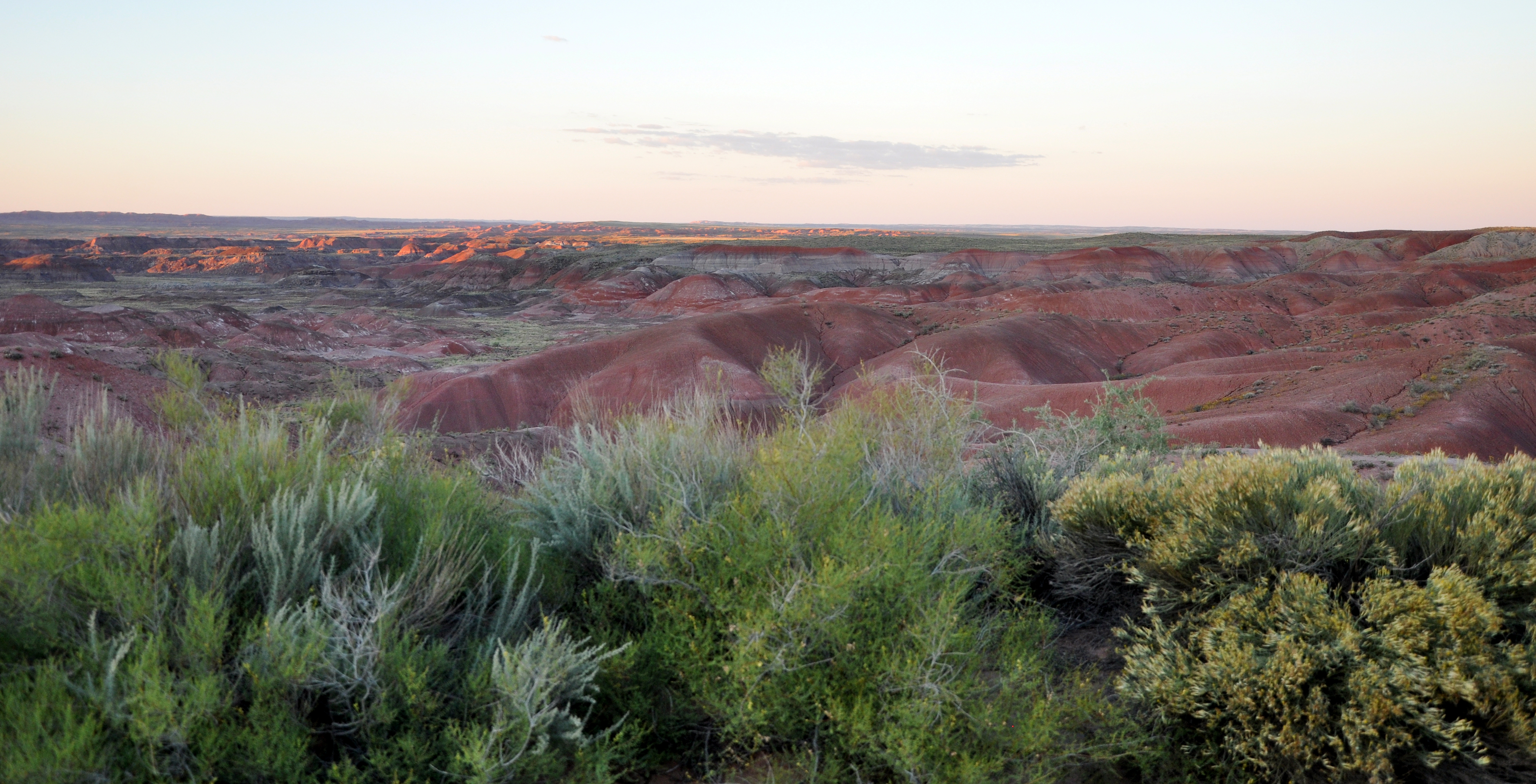
At Tiponi Point, lush vegetation on the Painted Desert rim overlooks the relatively barren badlands below.

According to the A. W. Kuchler U.S. Potential natural vegetation Types, Petrified Forest National Park encompasses two classifications; a Grama Bouteloua/Galleta Hilaria (plant) Steppe (53) potential vegetation type with a Desert Grassland (12) vegetation form and a Juniper/Pinyon pine (23) vegetation type with a Great Basin montane forest/Southwest Forest (4) vegetation form.

A 2005 survey found that 447 species of flora, of which 57 species are invasive, occur in the park. Although the park is known for its fossils and eroded badlands, its main environment is semi-desert shrub steppe. Protected from development and overgrazing for many years, the park has some of the best grassland in northeastern Arizona. In the northern part of the park, the volcanic soils of the Bidahochi Formation support abundant plant life along the Painted Desert rim. In contrast to the relatively bare badlands below, the rim is covered with shrubs, small trees, grasses, and herbs.

The dominant plants in the park include more than 100 grass species, many native to the region. Growing among the grasses are flowering species such as evening primrose, mariposa lily, and blue flax, and shrubs such as sagebrush, saltbush, and rabbitbrush. Among the wide variety of grasses are native perennial bunchgrass, blue grama, sacaton, sideoats grama, bearded sprangletop, and bush muhly. Invasive species that crowd out slower-spreading natives include annual lovegrass and brome (cheat grass).

Trees and shrubs grow in riparian zones along the park's washes. Willows and cottonwoods are the larger plants, joined by rushes and sedges. Here the invasive Eurasian tamarisk, also known as saltcedar, threatens native plants by crowding, using most of the available water, and increasing soil salinity by exuding salt through its leaves.

=== Fauna ===
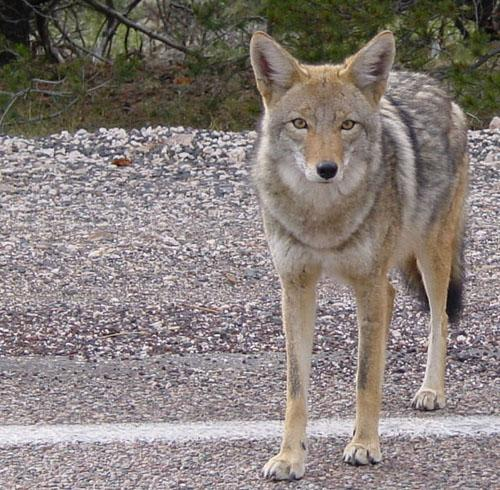
Coyotes are omnivores with a widely varied diet including many rodents.

Some of the larger animals roaming the grasslands include pronghorns, black-tailed jackrabbits (hares), Gunnison's prairie dogs, coyotes, bobcats and foxes. Pronghorns, the fastest land animals in North America, are capable of 60-mile-per-hour (97 km/h) sprints. They are the second fastest land animal on Earth. The blood vessels in the huge, thin-walled ears of the jackrabbits act as heat exchangers. These hares are known for their bursts of speed, long leaps, and zigzag routes, all of which protect them from being eaten by golden eagles and other predators. The prairie dogs live in large colonies or "towns", near which many other species find food and shelter. Coyotes dine largely on rodents but also eat fruits, reptiles, insects, small mammals, birds, and carrion.

Bobcats and bullsnakes hunt smaller animals, such as deer mice and white-tailed antelope squirrels in the park's riparian zones. Western pipistrelle bats feast on insects, and pallid bats eat beetles, centipedes, cicadas, praying mantises, scorpions, and other arthropods. On the Painted Desert rim, small animals find food and shelter among the denser foliage, and mule deer sometimes frequent the area.

More than 16 kinds of lizards and snakes live in various habitats in the park and consume large quantities of insects, spiders, scorpions, other reptiles, and small mammals. The collared lizard, which occurs in every habitat, is the largest and most often seen.

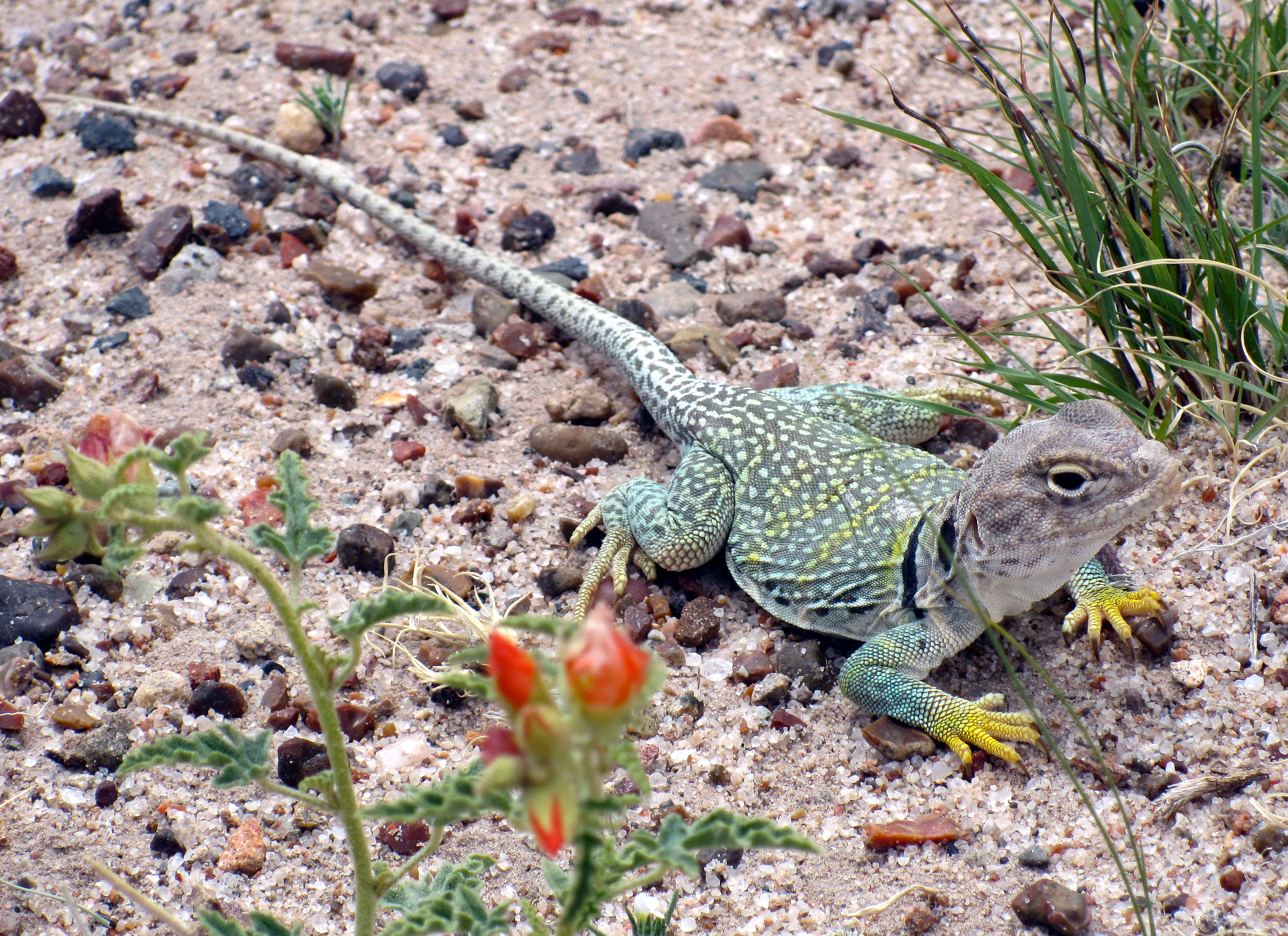
The collared lizard is the largest lizard in the park.

Plateau striped whiptails, a species consisting entirely of females, prefer grasslands and developed areas. Side-blotched lizards live in rocky areas of the park but are seldom seen. Gopher snakes, which sometimes imitate rattlesnakes when disturbed, are among the most common snakes in the park. The Prairie rattlesnake, the only venomous snake found in the park, prefers grasslands and shrub areas.

Seven kinds of amphibians, which drink no water but absorb it through their permeable skins, have been identified in Petrified Forest National Park. Tiger salamanders, found in grassland and near major drainages, are the only salamander species known in Arizona. Woodhouse's toads, which are seldom seen, are the largest toads in the park. They like grasslands, riparian corridors, and developed areas. Red-spotted toads, most active in the rainy season, July through September, are found in rocky areas near streams and in canyons. The Great Plains toad, the most common toad in the park, prefers grasslands. Resident spadefoot toads include the New Mexico, plains, and Couch's varieties.

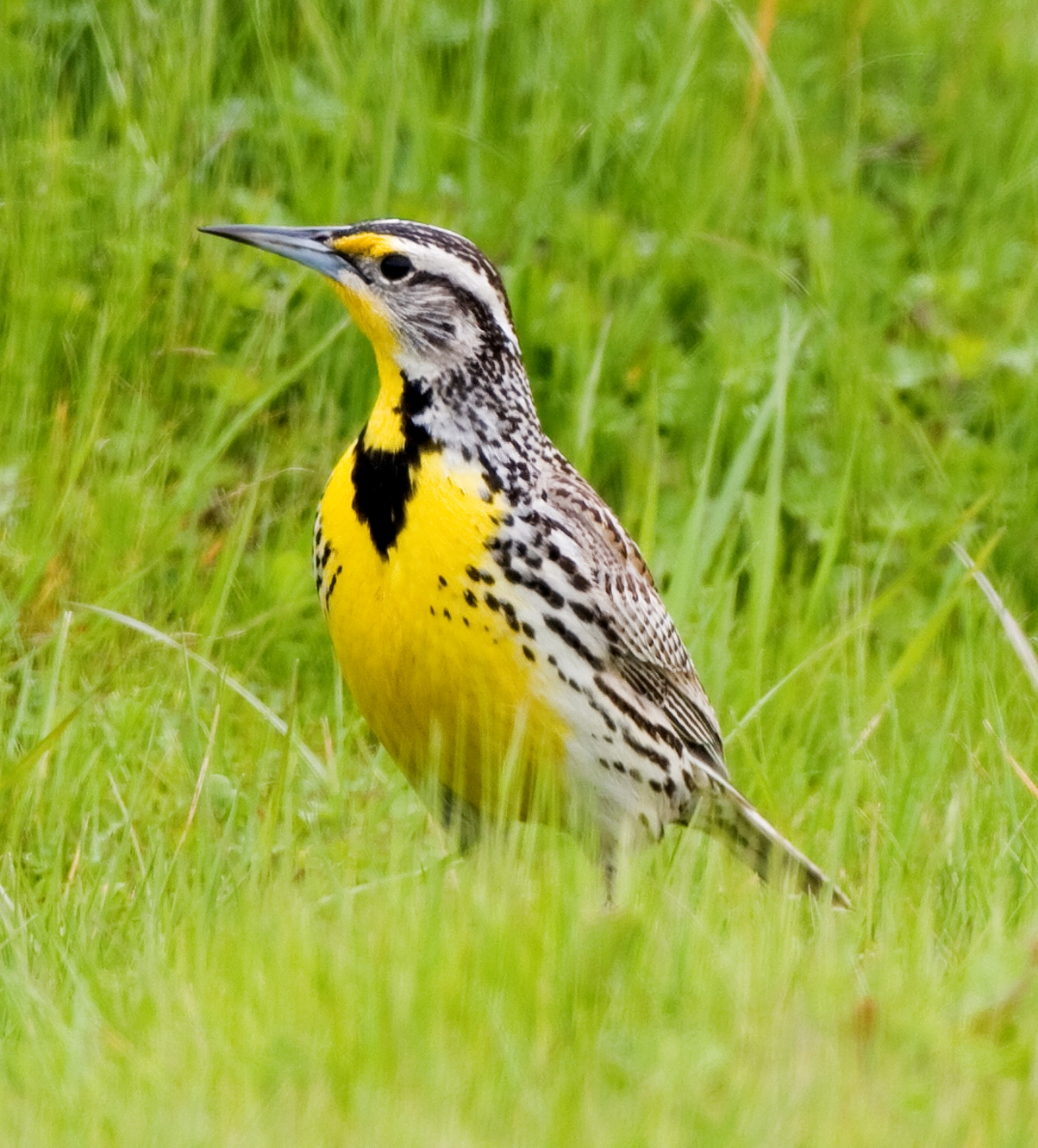
Western meadowlarks, prized for their song, frequent the park.

A survey conducted in 2006 identified 216 species of birds known to have occurred in Petrified Forest National Park since the park became a protected area in 1906. Of those, 33 species breed within the park, 6 other species probably do, and 18 species live in the park year-round. Thirty-five species live in the park only during the summer and 11 species only during the winter. The greatest diversity of birds occurs during fall and winter migrations.

Raptors, songbirds, and ground birds are found in the park's grassland, while the Puerco River's riparian corridor is a good place for year-round residents as well as migrants such as warblers, vireos, avocets, and killdeer. Developed areas around the visitor center and museum attract western tanagers, hermit warblers, house finches, and others. Occasional shorebirds and eastern birds also visit the park.

Birds commonly seen in the park include the common raven and the western meadowlark, known for its charming song. Anna's hummingbird, which can hover and fly backwards as well as forwards, is among the smallest birds in the park. The largest is the golden eagle, with a wingspan of up to 7 feet (2 m).

== Activities ==
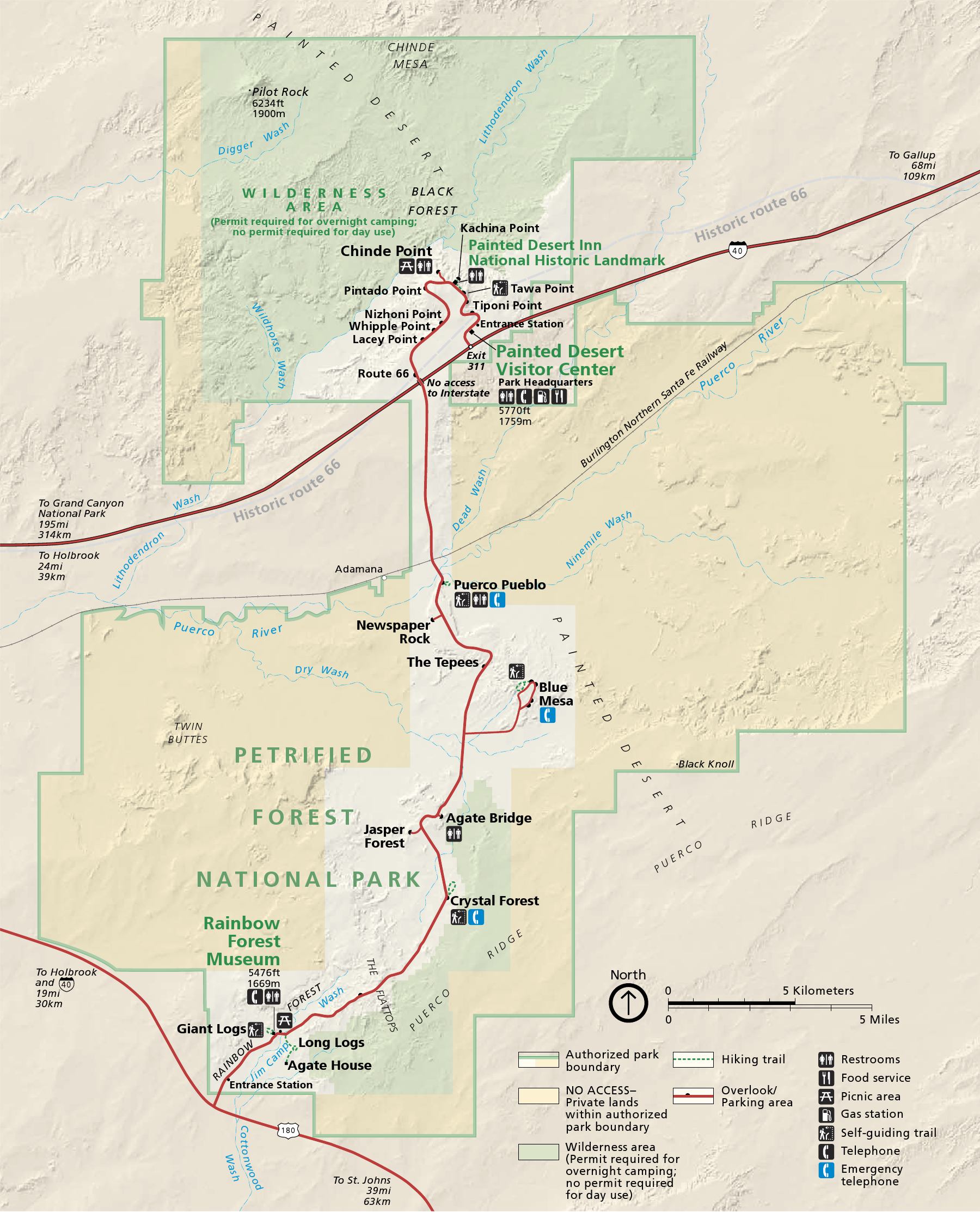
Map of the park

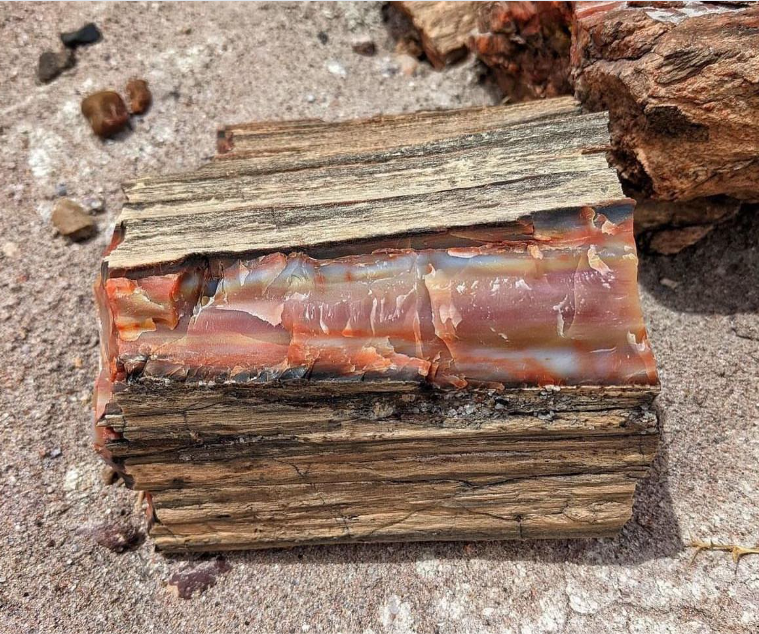
Closeup of a specimen of petrified wood, from The Conscience Pile, returned by visitors.

The park is open every day except Thanksgiving and Christmas on a schedule that varies slightly with the seasons. In 2010, it and its Painted Desert Visitor Center and Rainbow Forest Museum were open from 7 a.m. to 7 p.m. from May 9 through September 6 but opened as early as 8 a.m. and closed as late as 5 p.m. during other parts of the year. The Painted Desert Inn (a historic museum and bookstore) is open from 9 a.m. to 5 p.m. year-round except Christmas. Park clocks are always set to Mountain Standard Time, as Arizona does not observe Daylight Saving Time.

The Painted Desert Visitor Center, designed by modernist architect Richard Neutra, is part of the Painted Desert Community Complex Historic District listed on the National Register of Historic Places. Eight other sites within the park are also on the National Register, including the Painted Desert Inn and associated cabins, the Agate House Pueblo, the Painted Desert Petroglyphs and Ruins Archeological District, Newspaper Rock Petroglyphs Archeological District, Puerco Ruin and Petroglyphs, the Flattop Site (an archeological site), the Twin Buttes Archeological District, and the 35th Parallel Route (also known as the Beale Camel Trail). The Painted Desert Inn was upgraded to a National Historic Landmark in 1987.

The visitor center, which is near the north entrance to the park, offers visitor information and shows a 20-minute orientation movie, "Timeless Impressions", once every half-hour. It has a bookstore, exhibits, a restaurant open from 8 a.m. to 3 p.m., a gift shop, a gas station, a post office open from 11 a.m. to 1 p.m. Monday through Friday, a postal drop box, and public restrooms. The Rainbow Forest Museum complex 2 miles (3.2 km) north of the park's south entrance offers services including information and "Timeless Impressions" showings once every half-hour. It has a bookstore, fossil exhibits, an interactive Triassic Virtual Tour, limited food service, a gift shop, and public restrooms. The Painted Desert Inn, 2 miles (3.2 km) north of the Painted Desert Visitor Center, offers visitor information. It has a bookstore, museum exhibits (including the building itself), and public restrooms.

No campgrounds or overnight lodging are available in the park, although nearby communities such as Holbrook offer motels and other accommodations. Overnight parking is not allowed except in the case of backpackers with wilderness hiking permits. Sightseeing is available by private automobile, motorcycle, commercial tour, bicycle, and hiking. The park road, parking lots, and turn-outs are big enough to accommodate large recreational vehicles. Off-road vehicle travel, including by mountain bike, is not allowed. With a few exceptions such as unpaved Old Highway 66, bicycles must stay on paved roads such as the 28-mile (45 km) main park road and stay off trails and unpaved surfaces.

The park's seven maintained hiking trails, some paved, vary in length from less than 0.5 miles (0.8 km) to nearly 3 miles (4.8 km). Pets are allowed on these trails if kept on a leash, but bicycles are not. These named trails are Painted Desert Rim, Puerco Pueblo, Blue Mesa, Crystal Forest, Giant Logs, Long Logs, and Agate House. There are also nine recently developed day-hike routes on unpaved and largely unmarked routes called "Off the Beaten Path" hikes. Hikers and backpackers may also visit the park's wilderness areas. Free permits are required for overnight stays; they are issued from the Painted Desert Visitor Center, Painted Desert Inn, and Rainbow Forest Museum. Most backpackers enter the wilderness at the north end of the park, where parking and an access trail are available at Painted Desert Inn. Group camping is limited to eight people. Horseback riding is allowed in the wilderness areas; water for horses is available at the service station near the Painted Desert Visitor Center. Riders and hikers are asked to travel along dry washes as much as possible to reduce the impact on fragile desert soils.

Rangers offer a variety of programs about the park. Regularly scheduled events include a Painted Desert Inn tour, a Triassic program at the Rainbow Forest Museum sunroom, a talk or walk along the Giant Logs Trail behind the museum, and a Puerco Pueblo guided walk. The park hosts special events related to Earth Science Week and National American Indian Heritage Month. On Saturdays from Memorial Day weekend through Labor Day at the Painted Desert Inn, artisans from the region give cultural demonstrations related to ancient peoples, intertribal relationships, and European-descent cultures. For students and teachers, the rangers offer educational materials and field-trip talks. In some years during the summer months, artists-in-residence work in the park.

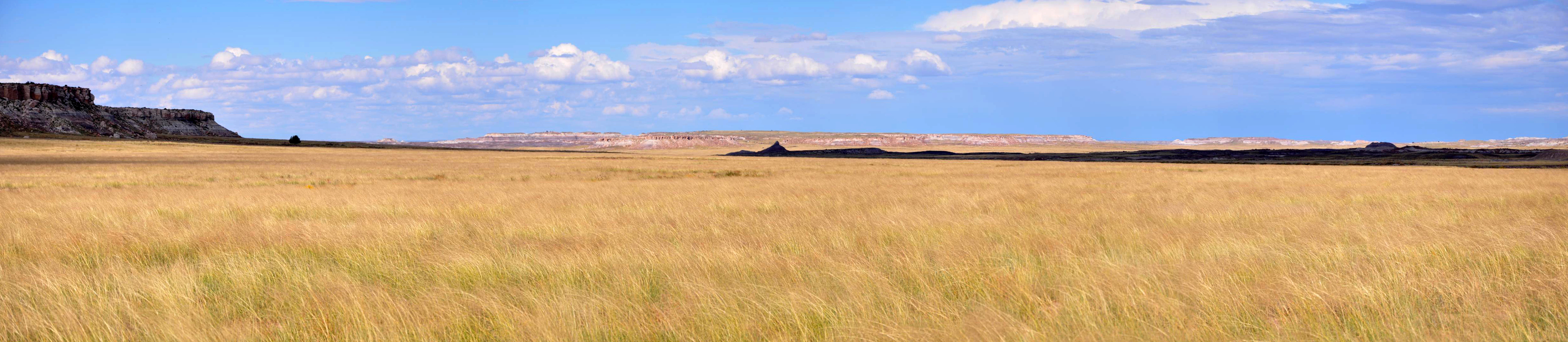
Panorama of shortgrass prairie near Dry Wash in the southern section of the park. View is to the east from near the main park road. The dark area on the ground to the right is a cloud shadow.

== See also ==
- Ancestral Puebloans
- Forty Houses, Chihuahua
- Gila Cliff Dwellings National Monument
- Hohokam
- Hubbell Trading Post National Historic Site
- Kinishba Ruins
- List of national parks of the United States
- List of areas in the United States National Park System
- Mogollon culture
- Paquimé, Chihuahua
- Southwestern archaeology
- The Conscience Pile

== Works cited ==
- Ash, Sidney (2005). Petrified Forest: A Story in Stone (2nd rev. ed.). Petrified Forest National Park, Arizona: Petrified Forest Museum Association. ISBN 978-0-945695-11-0.
- Jones, Anne Trinkle (1993). Stalking the Past: Prehistory at the Petrified Forest. Petrified Forest National Park, Arizona: Petrified Forest Museum Association. ISBN 978-0-945695-04-2.
- Hansen, Monica L.; Thomas, Kathryn A. (2006). "The Flora of a Unique Badland and Arid Grassland Environment: Petrified Forest National Park, Arizona". In Parker, William G; Thompson, Patricia A. (eds.). A Century of Research at Petrified Forest National Park: Bulletin No. 63. Flagstaff, Arizona: Museum of Northern Arizona. ISBN 978-0-89734-133-2.
- Van Riper, Charles III; Lamow, Marg (2006). "A 2006 Bird Checklist for Petrified Forest National Park". In Parker, William G; Thompson, Patricia A. (eds.). A Century of Research at Petrified Forest National Park: Bulletin No. 63. Flagstaff, Arizona: Museum of Northern Arizona. ISBN 978-0-89734-133-2.
