= List of cemeteries in Arizona =

This list of cemeteries in Arizona, listed by county, includes currently operating, pioneer, historical (closed for new interments), and defunct (graves abandoned or removed) cemeteries, columbaria, and mausolea which are historical and/or noteworthy. It does not include pet cemeteries.

== Apache ==
- Adamanda
  - Adamanda Gravesite
- Alpine
  - Alpine Cemetery
- Chambers
  - McCarrell Memorial Cemetery
- Chinle
  - Chinle Cemetery
- Concho
  - Concho Catholic Cemetery
  - Erastus Cemetery
  - La Culebra Ranch Cemetery
  - Lopez Cemetery
  - Sandoval Family Cemetery
  - Ward Cemetery
- Cornfields
  - Cornfields Community Cemetery
- Cottonwood
  - Begay-Charley Family Cemetery
- Cove
  - Cove Cemetery
  - Immanuel Mission Cemetery
- Del Muerto
  - Ben Family Cemetery
  - Del Muerto Community Cemetery
  - Tellers Acres Cemetery
- Dennehotso
  - Dennehotso Community Cemetery
- Eagar
  - Amity Cemetery
  - Eagar Cemetery
  - Snyder-Cavanaugh Burial Ground
- El Tule
  - El Tule Cemetery
- Fort Defiance
  - Bowman Memorial Park
  - Fort Defiance Cemetery
  - Good Shepherd Mission Cemetery
  - Navajo Veterans Cemetery
  - Rainbow Ridge Family Cemetery
- Ganado
  - Ganado Community Cemetery
  - Ganado Mission Cemetery (Presbyterian)
  - Hubbell Hill Cemetery
- Houck
  - Francis Family Cemetery
  - Houck Community Cemetery
  - New Houck Veteran and Community Cemetery
  - Tekakwitha Catholic Mission Cemetery (named after Kateri Tekakwitha, a Catholic saint)
- Hunters Point
  - Notah Family Cemetery
- Kinlichee (near Ganado)
  - Kinlichee Cemetery
- Klagetoh
  - Klagetoh Cemetery, a.k.a. Saint Anne Mission Cemetery
- Lukachukai
  - Lukachukai Cemetery
- Lupton
  - Lupton Cemetery
  - Family Cemeteries in the Lupton area
- McNary
  - McNary Cemeteries – North and South
  - McNary Church Cemetery, a.k.a. McNary Cemetery
  - Ponderosa Pine Cemetery
- Mexican Water
  - Mexican Water Community Cemetery
- NaHaTa'Dzill
  - NaHaTa'Dzill Cemetery
- Navajo
  - Navajo Cemetery
  - Navajo South Cemetery
- Nazlini
  - Nazlini Cemetery
- Nutrioso
  - Maxwell Family Cemetery
  - Nutrioso Cemetery
  - Rogers Family Cemetery
  - Rufus C Williams Burial Site
- Oak Springs
  - Oak Springs Cemetery
- Red Mesa
  - Beulah Land Cemetery
  - Red Mesa Cemetery
  - Sunrise Cemetery
- Rock Point
  - Rock Point Cemetery
- Rough Rock
  - Rough Rock Cemetery
- Round Rock
  - Roessel Family Cemetery
- Saint Johns
  - East Side Cemetery
  - Julianita Lopez Grave Site
  - Saint Johns Catholic Cemetery
  - Saint Johns Cemetery
- Saint Michaels
  - Saint Michaels Cemetery
- Salido
  - Salado Cemetery
- Sanders
  - New Lands Cemetery
  - Sanders Cemetery
- Sawmill
  - Sawmill Community Cemetery
- Springerville
  - Becker Family Cemetery
  - Burk Cemetery
  - Slaughter Family Cemetery
  - Springerville Cemetery
  - Springerville Cemetery Lower Section
  - Springerville–Eager Cemetery
- St. Johns
  - St. Johns Cemetery
- Steamboat Canyon
  - Navajo Family Burial Grounds
- Teec Nos Pos
  - Teec Nos Pos Cemetery
- Tes Nez Iah
  - Tes Nez Iah Cemetery
- Toyei
  - Williams Family Cemetery
- Tsaile
  - Begay Family Plot
- Tselani Springs
  - Tselani Springs Cemetery
- Vernon
  - Vernon Cemetery
- Wheatfields
  - Wheatfields Cemetery
- Wide Ruins
  - Mennonite Cemetery
  - Wide Ruins Cemetery
- No associated community or town (includes wilderness areas)
  - Black Mountain Community Cemetery
  - Butler Cemetery
  - Charlie Chappo Memorial Cemetery
  - Damon Cemetery
  - Floy Plenty Cemetery
  - Goat Springs Cemetery
  - Greer Cemetery
  - Jumbo Family Cemetery
  - Many Farms Lake Family Cemetery
  - Nez Family Cemetery
  - Old North Ranch Cemetery
  - Old Norton Ranch
  - Red Valley Community Cemetery
  - Rock Head Cemetery
  - Saint Isabelle Community Cemetery
  - Schultz Gravesite
  - Steamboat Cemetery
  - Sweet Water Family Cemetery
  - Tiapai Cemetery

== Cochise ==
- Apache
  - Apache Cemetery
  - Poteet Cemetery
- Benson
  - Circle Bar Ranch Cemetery
  - Cochise Gardens of Rest Cemetery
  - High Street Cemetery, a.k.a. Benson City Cemetery
  - Mescal Cemetery
  - Miramonte Cemetery
  - San Pedro Valley UMC Columbarium
  - Seventh Street Cemetery, a.k.a. Old Benson Cemetery
- Bisbee (ghost town)
  - Cochise Memory Gardens
  - Don Luis Cemetery
  - Evergreen Cemetery, a.k.a. Bisbee City Cemetery & Bisbee/Lowell Cemetery (NRHP-listed)
  - Hannon Family Cemetery
  - Memory Gardens Cemetery
  - Old Bisbee City Park Cemetery
- Bowie
  - Berry Family Cemetery
  - Bowie Desert Rest Cemetery
  - Fort Bowie (National Historic Park, with cemetery), near Apache Pass
- Cascabel
  - Cascabel Cemetery
  - Gamez Cemetery
- Charleston, ghost town near the San Pedro River
  - Charleston Cemetery
- Chiricahua National Monument
  - Chorocahua Wilderness Memorials
  - Erickson Cemetery
  - Michael Keating Gravesite
- Cochise (ghost town)
  - Cochise Cemetery
  - Soza Cemetery (Soza Ranch Cemetery)
- Contention City (ghost town)
  - Contention City Cemetery
- Courtland (ghost town)
  - Courtland Cemetery
- Dos Cabezas (ghost town)
  - Dos Cabezas Pioneer Cemetery
  - Hudson Family Cemetery
  - Hurtado Family Ranch Cemetery
- Douglas
  - Calvary Cemetery, a.k.a. Douglas City Cemetery
  - Calvary Memorial Park, a.k.a. Douglas Memorial Cemetery
  - Douglas Cemetery
  - Douglas Jewish Cemetery
  - Leake Family Cemetery
  - Sacred Heart Cemetery
  - Tufa Cemetery
  - Watson Family Ranch Cemetery
  - Wells Family Cemetery
  - Will Cemetery
- Dragoon
  - Dragoon Springs Stage Station Site – scene of two battles during the American Civil War, has graves in the Dragoon Springs Cemetery
  - Texas Canyon Pioneer Cemetery, a.k.a. Dragoon Cemetery
- Elfrida
  - Elfrida Van Meter Park
  - Lovelady Family Cemetery
  - Whitewater Cemetery, a.k.a. Elfrida Cemetery, Whitewater Cemetery Old
- Fairbank (ghost town)
  - Escudero Ranch Cemetery
  - Fairbank Cemetery
  - Harkey Ranch Cemetery
- Guadalupe Spring
  - Cottonwood Creek Cemetery
- Gleeson (ghost town)
  - Gleeson Cemetery
- Hilltop (ghost town)
  - Hall Ranch Cemetery
  - Hilltop Cemetery
  - Pinery Cemetery
- Huachuca City
  - Babacomari Ranch Cemetery
  - Campstone Cemetery
  - James Kelly Ranch Cemetery
  - West Railroad Drive Burial Ground
- Johnson
  - Johnson Mine/Russellville Cemetery, a.k.a. Adams Cemetery
  - Johnson Cemetery
- Kansas Settlement
  - Kansas Settlement Gin Cemetery
- Lowell
  - Forrest Ranch Family Cemetery
  - Russellville-Dragoon Cemetery, Johnson Mine Cemetery
- McNeal
  - McNeal Cemetery
- Naco
  - Naco Cemetery East
  - Naco Cemetery North
  - Kathryn Frazier (Frazier Family) cemetery
- Palominas
  - Miracle Valley Cemetery, a.k.a. Allen Family Cemetery
- Paradise (ghost town)
  - Paradise Cemetery
- Paul Spur, a.k.a. Forrest
  - Elisha Smith Gravesite (Member of the Mormon Battalion)
  - Paul Spur Cemetery
- Pearce (ghost town)
  - Igo Ranch Family Cemetery
  - Pearce Cemetery
  - Pressey Homestead Cemetery
- Pirtleville
  - Old Pirtleville Cemetery
  - Old Sacred Heart Cemetery
  - Pirtleville Cemetery, a.k.a. Sacred Heart Cemetery
  - Wills Cemetery
- Pomerene
  - Pomerene Cemetery
- Portal
  - John Edwards Hands Gravesite
  - Reed Cemetery
  - Round Valley Cemetery
- Ramsey
  - John F. Ashworth Gravesite
  - Ramsay Canyon Cemetery
- Rucker Canyon
  - Rucker Cemetery
- San Simon
  - Homewood Cemetery, a.k.a. San Simon Cemetery
  - Railroad Cemetery
  - San Simon Butterfield Station
- Sierra Vista
  - Brown Canyon Cemetery
  - Cochise Memory Gardens
  - Faith Presbyterian Church Memorial Garden
  - Fort Huachuca Post Cemetery (Tompkins Memorial Park)
  - Frierson Gravesite
  - Fry Pioneer Cemetery (NRHP-listed)
  - Holy Hope Cemetery
  - Jack F. Ashworth Gravesite
  - Mother Teresa Columbarium, a.k.a. Our Lady of the Mountains Catholic Church Cemetery
  - Newman Ranch Family Cemetery
  - Ramsey Canyon Cemetery, a.k.a. Ramsey Pioneer Cemetery
  - Ratliff Gravesites
  - Saint Andrew the Apostle Memorial Garden
  - Saint Stephens Episcopal Church Columbarium
  - Sierra Evangelical Lutheran Church Columbarium
  - Sierra Vista United Methodist Church Columbarium
  - Southern Arizona Veterans Memorial Cemetery (SAVMC) – also, the Historic Cemetery of the Southern Arizona Veterans, a.k.a. Historical Soldier Memorial Cemetery is within this cemetery
- San Bernardino
  - Slaughter Family Cemetery
- St. David
  - Holy Trinity Monastery Cemetery
  - Saint David Cemetery
- Sunizona
  - J. S. Potter Gravesite
  - Kambitsch Cemetery
  - Light Cemetery
  - Morris Family Farm Burial Site
  - Sanders Ranch Cemetery
- Sunnyside (ghost town)
  - Old MacNab Ranch Cemetery
  - Sunnyside Pioneer Cemetery
- Tombstone
  - Boothill Graveyard, Tombstone
  - Boothill Cemetery Jewish Section
  - Brunckow's Cabin (ghost town) near Tombstone – scene of 1860s–1890s shootouts and where victims were buried
  - Double C Family Cemetery
  - Hughes Ranch Cemetery
  - Presidio Santa Cruz de Terrenate Cemetery
  - Tombstone City Cemetery
  - Tombstone Cemetery New Addition
- Twiston
  - Twiston Cemetery
- Walnut Gulch
  - McClelland Gravesite Memorials
- Willcox
  - Johnny Ringo State Historical Landmark
  - Johnny Ringo Gravesite Cemetery
  - Klump Family Ranch Cemetery
  - Martin Ranch Cemetery
  - Mountain Valley Mennonite Church Cemetery
  - Old City Cemetery (Pioneer cemetery)
  - Railroad Park
  - Smith Carlton Family Cemetery
  - Sunset Cemetery
  - Willcox Cemetery, a.k.a. Wilcox Pioneer Cemetery
  - Willcox Southwest Cemetery
- No associated community or town (includes wilderness areas)
  - Adling Family Cemetery
  - Apodaca Cemetery
  - Ash Canyon Cemetery Memorials (includes Morgan Gravesite)
  - Bear Creak Cemetery
  - Biederman Homestead Burial Site, a.k.a. Charles Biederman Burial Site
  - Black Diamond Cemetery
  - Cottonwood Cemetery
  - East Whitetail Canyon gravesite
  - Ed Schieffelin Gravesite
  - El Dorado Cemetery, a.k.a. Neighborhood Cemetery
  - Fulton Ranch Cemetery
  - Hand/Lone Star Ranch Cemetery
  - Herfort Hill Cemetery
  - Huachuca Siding Cemetery
  - John James Gidding Gravesite
  - Lamar Family Cemetery
  - Lone Mountain Cemetery
  - Lone Mountain Ranch Cemetery
  - Lone Star Mine Cemetery
  - Luzena Graves
  - Mesa Draw Gravesite
  - Murphy-Exline Family Cemetery
  - Old Leslie Ranch Cemetery, a.k.a. Old Magnolia Ranch Cemetery
  - Paxton Cemetery
  - Pinery Canyon Gravesites
  - Riggs Family Cemetery
  - Smith Gravesite
  - Sonoita Gravesite
  - Sulphur Springs Cemetery
  - Whitehouse Ruins Grave
  - Whitewater School Cemetery

== Coconino ==
- Big Dry Wash
  - Big Dry Wash Battlefield (Apache Wars) burial site
- Camp Navajo, near Bellemont
  - Camp Navajo National Cemetery, a.k.a. Arizona Veterans Memorial Cemetery at Camp Navajo
- Canyon Diablo (ghost town)
  - Boot Hill Cemetery (defunct)
  - Canyon Diablo Cemetery (defunct)
- Coal Mine Mesa (ghost town)
  - Coal Mine Mesa Cemetery
  - Coal Mine Community Cemetery
- Cow Springs
  - Cow Springs Cemetery
- Flagstaff
  - Calvary Catholic Cemetery (Est. 1892)
  - Citizens Cemetery
  - Episcopal Church of the Epiphany Columbarium
  - Federated Community Church Columbarium
  - Greenwood Cemetery (defunct)
  - Lowell Observatory, Mausoleum
  - Peaceful Valley Memorial Park (defunct)
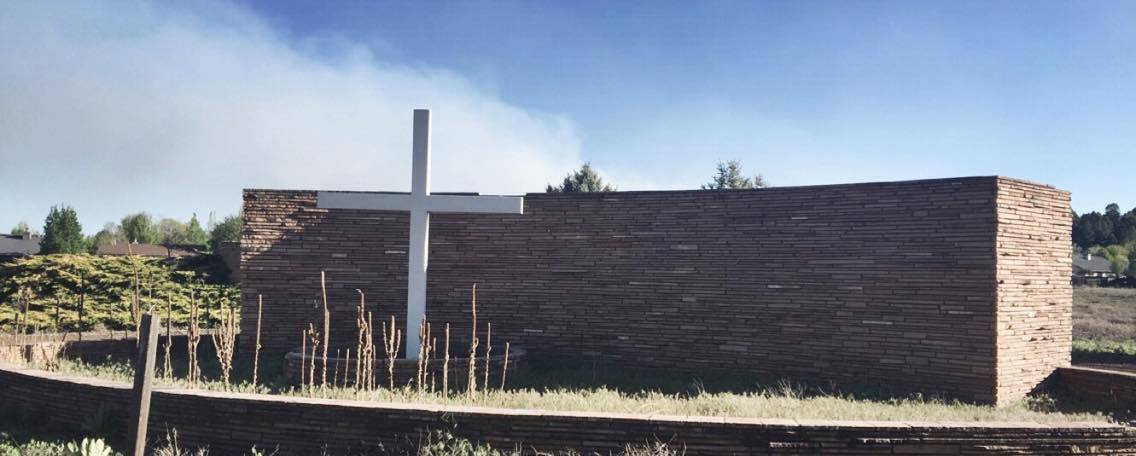
    Peaceful Valley Memorial Park
  - Trinity Heights United Meth. Church Columbarium
- Fredonia
  - Fredonia town cemetery
- Grand Canyon
  - Brant Family Gravesite
  - Grand Canyon Village, gravesite of Rees B. Griffiths
  - Grand Canyon Pioneer Cemetery, a.k.a. American Legion Cemetery, South Rim Cemetery
  - Supai (an Indian town in the canyon itself)
    - Drift Fence Cemetery
- House Rock Valley
  - Honeymoon Trail Gravesites
  - House Rock Cemetery
  - Parker Place Cemetery
- Kachina Village
  - Raymond County Park
- Kaibito
  - June Family Cemetery
- Lee's Ferry
  - Lees Ferry Cemetery
  - Lonely Dell Cemetery, Lonely Dell Ranch Historic District
- Leupp
  - Cody Family Plot
  - Fuson Family Plot
  - Leupp Village Cemetery, Navajo Nation Reservation
- Moenkopi
  - Old LDS Tuba City Church Cemetery (Hopi Indian Reservation)
- Page
  - Page City Cemetery
  - Waterhole Canyon Ranch Family Cemetery
- Parks
  - Wrights Cemetery
- Rare Metals
  - Rare Metals Cemetery
- Red Lake
  - Navajo Nation Cemetery, a.k.a. John Daw Gravesite
  - Red Lake Cemetery
- Red Mesa
  - Dzillichii Cemetery
- Sedona
  - Christ Lutheran Church Memorial Garden
  - Church of the Red Rocks Columbarium
  - Red Rock Cemetery, Sedona
  - Saint Lukes Memorial Garden
  - Sedona Community Cemetery
  - Sedona United Methodist Church Columbarium
  - Sedona Memorial Park
- Tolani
  - White Grass Family Cemetery (Navajo Indian Reservation)
- Tonales
  - Tonalea Community Cemetery
- Tuba City
  - Coalmine Cemetery (defunct)
  - Tuba Community Cemetery
  - Tube City Original Cemetery
- Williams
  - Kaibab Forest Cemetery
  - Williams Cemetery, a.k.a. Mountain View Cemetery
- No associated community or town (includes wilderness areas)
  - ASC Cemetery
  - Andres Moreno Gravesite
  - Begay Butler Family Cemetery
  - Cooks Cemetery
  - John Daw Grave
  - Ketchum Family Plot
  - Kitsillie Cemetery
  - Lonely Dell Cemetery
  - Mars Hill Grave
  - Naatsis'aan Family Cemetery Memorials
  - O'Haco Memorials
  - Punkin Center Cemetery
  - Táchii’nii Family Plot
  - Tse Bi Wosh Giizhi

== Gila ==
- Ceder Creek
  - Jewish Memorial
  - Morning Dove Cemetery
  - R-14 Crossing Cemetery
  - Red Hill Cemetery
- Cedar Creek Crossing
  - R-14 Family Cemetery
- Central Heights
  - B.P.O.E. Rest Cemetery
  - Croatian Lodges Cemetery
  - Pinal Cemetery
  - Serbian Cemetery
- Christmas (ghost town)
  - Christmas Cemetery
- Gisela
  - Gisela Cemeteries (North and South)
  - Rolan Ranch Cemetery
- Globe
  - Globe Cemetery
  - Pinal Cemetery
  - St. John's Episcopal Church Memorial Garden
- Hayden
  - Mountain View Cemetery
- Haigler Creek
  - Colcord Road Cemetery
  - Jakes Corner/Hardt Cemetery
  - Tonto Basin Cemetery
- Miami
  - Mountain Breeze Memorial Gardens
  - Our Lady of the Blessed Sacrament Church Cemetery
  - Valley Memorial Park Cemetery
- Payson
  - Annie Narrow-See (gravesite), Spring Creek
  - Payson Pioneer Cemetery
  - Tonto National Forest Cemetery
- Peridot
  - Chinatown Cemetery
  - Lower Peridot Cemetery
- Pine
  - Pine Cemetery
- Punkin Center
  - Cline Family Cemetery
  - Murphy Ranch Cemetery
  - Packard Graves Site
- Roosevelt
  - Andy Lawrence Burial Site
  - Annie See Gravesite
  - Bacon Family Cemetery
  - Roosevelt Cemetery (Roosevelt Lake) (Historic)
  - Windy Hill Burial Grounds
- Round Valley, Arizona
  - Mountain Meadows Memorial Gardens, a.k.a. Mountain Meadows Memorial Park and Crematory
- Rye
  - Brown Family Cemetery
  - Davey Gowan Burial Site
  - Haught Ranch Pioneer Cemetery, a.k.a. "Last Roundup"
- San Carlos
  - Dewey Family Cemetery
  - Elgo Dam Cemetery
  - Hilltop Cemetery
  - Holy Ground Cemetery
  - Northgate Cemetery
  - Rice Graveyard 1880–1930
  - San Carlos Apache Tribal Veterans Cemetery
  - San Carlos Cemetery
- Star Valley
  - Star Valley Cemetery
- Strawberry
  - Strawberry Old Cemetery
- Tonto Apache Indian Reservation
  - Tonto Apache Indian Reservation Cemetery
- Tonto Basin
  - Greenback Ranch Cemetery
- Winkelman
  - Winkelman Cemetery
- Young
  - Cherry Creek Ranch Cemetery
  - J Redman Gravesite
  - Navajo Sheepherder Gravesite
  - Middleton Ranch Graves/Cemetery, Wilson Creek
  - Q Ranch Historic Cemetery
  - Pleasant Valley Cemetery
  - Tewksbury Family Plot
  - Tewksbury-Jacobs Gravesite (Pleasant Valley War)
  - Young Cemetery
- No associated community or town (includes wilderness areas)
  - A-Cross Road/Windy Hill Cemetery
  - Bellevue Gravesite
  - Canyon Day Cemetery
  - Central Heights
  - Christmas Cemetery
  - Conner Gravesite
  - Ellison Creek – Goswick Graves
  - Flying H Ranch Burial Site
  - Gila River Cemetery
  - Gordon Canyon Cemetery
  - Goswick Family Cemetery
  - H Four Cemetery
  - Holder Cemetery
  - Seventy-Nine (79) Mile Cemetery
  - St. Paul's Episcopal Church Columbarium
  - Upper Peridot Cemetery

== Graham ==
- Artesia
  - Artesia Cemetery
- Bonita
  - Bonita Cemetery
- Bryce
  - Bryce Cemetery
- Bylas
  - Blackpoint Cemetery
  - Bylas Veterans Cemetery (San Carlos Reservation)
  - Middle Mesa Cemetery
  - Navajo Point Cemetery
- Camp Goodwin
- Central
  - Central Cemetery
  - Central (Old) Cemetery
- Eden
  - Eden Cemetery
- Emery
  - Emery Cemetery, a.k.a. Fort Thomas Ward Cemetery, Geronimo Cemetery
- Fort Thomas
  - Ashurst Cemetery
  - Fort Thomas Cemetery
  - Old Fort Thomas Military Cemetery
- Geronimo
  - Hinton Cemetery
- Glenbar
  - Glenbar Cemetery, a.k.a. Mathews Cemetery
- Graham
  - Graham County Cemetery
- Klondyke
  - Aravaipa Canyon Cemetery
  - Deer Creek Cemetery
  - Klondyke Cemetery
- Pima
  - Old Pima Cemetery
  - Pima Cemetery
  - Tripp Canyon Burial Site
- Safford City
  - Brenner Cemetery
  - Gila Valley Memorial Gardens, a.k.a. Rest Haven Cemetery
  - Lebanon Cemetery
  - Safford City Cemetery, a.k.a. Safford Union Cemetery, Union Cemetery
  - Saint Paisius Orthodox Monastery Cemetery
- San Jose
  - Garcia Family Cemetery
  - Molina Farm Cemetery
  - San Jose Cemetery
- Sanchez
  - Earven Family Cemetery
  - Sanchez Cemetery
  - Serna Family Cemetery
- Solomon
  - Epley Cemetery
  - Solomon Cemetery
- Sunset
  - Bell Cemetery
  - Mountain View Cemetery, a.k.a. Wear Family Cemetery
- Thatcher
  - Hubbard Cemetery
  - Thatcher Cemetery
- Whitlock Cienega
  - Posey Homestead Burial Site
- No associated community or town (includes wilderness areas)
  - Ash Peak Cemetery
  - Black Hills Byway Burial Site
  - Cedar Springs Butte Cemetery
  - Cooley Mountain – Annie-See Remote Grave Cemetery
  - Corporal Charles E Elward Gravesite Memorials
  - Johns Cemetery
  - Johnson Cemetery (Cedar Springs)
  - Kennedy Family Cemetery
  - Lindsey Grave
  - Matthewsville Cemetery
  - McEuen Cemetery
  - Rogers Cemetery
  - Salazar Cemetery
  - Whalen Cemetery

== Greenlee ==
- Blue
  - Blue Cemetery
  - Blue River Gravesites
  - Lanphier Ranch Cemetery
- Clifton
  - Clifton Cemeteries (one and two)
  - Double Circle Ranch and Pioneer Cemetery, Eagle Greek, Clifton
  - Metcalf Cemetery
- Duncan
  - Duncan Valley Cemetery
  - Herrara-Trujillo Family Cemetery
  - Sacred Heart Cemetery
  - Sacred Heart Church Columbarium
  - Sanders Family Cemetery
  - Sheldon Cemetery
- Franklin
  - Franklin Cemetery
- Morenci
  - Bunker Cemetery
  - Old Morenci Mexicano Cemetery
  - Various old Catholic and mine cemeteries
- Sheldon
  - Sheldon Cemetery
- York
  - Yorks Ranch Cemetery
- No associated community or town (includes wilderness areas)
  - Ash Peak Trading Post gravesite
  - Bat Canyon Grave North
  - Bat Canyon Grave South
  - Blue Cemetery
  - Charles Allen Hamblin Gravesite
  - Coronado Spring graves
  - Double Circle Ranch Cemetery
  - Eagle Creek Graves
  - Fritz Gravesite
  - Guthrie Cemetery
  - Hot Springs Cemetery
  - Jones Cemetery
  - Metcalf Cemetery
  - Metcalf Indian Cemetery
  - Old Duncan Cemetery
  - Sacred Heart Catholic Cemetery
  - Stergo Cemetery
  - Swafford Gravesite
  - Ward Canyon Cemetery
  - Ward Family Cemetery

== La Paz ==
- Bouse (ghost town)
  - Bouse Cemetery – remnants of graves
- Cibola
  - Bishop Family Cemetery
  - Cibola Cemetery – remnants of graves
  - Swain Farm Cemetery
- Ehrenberg
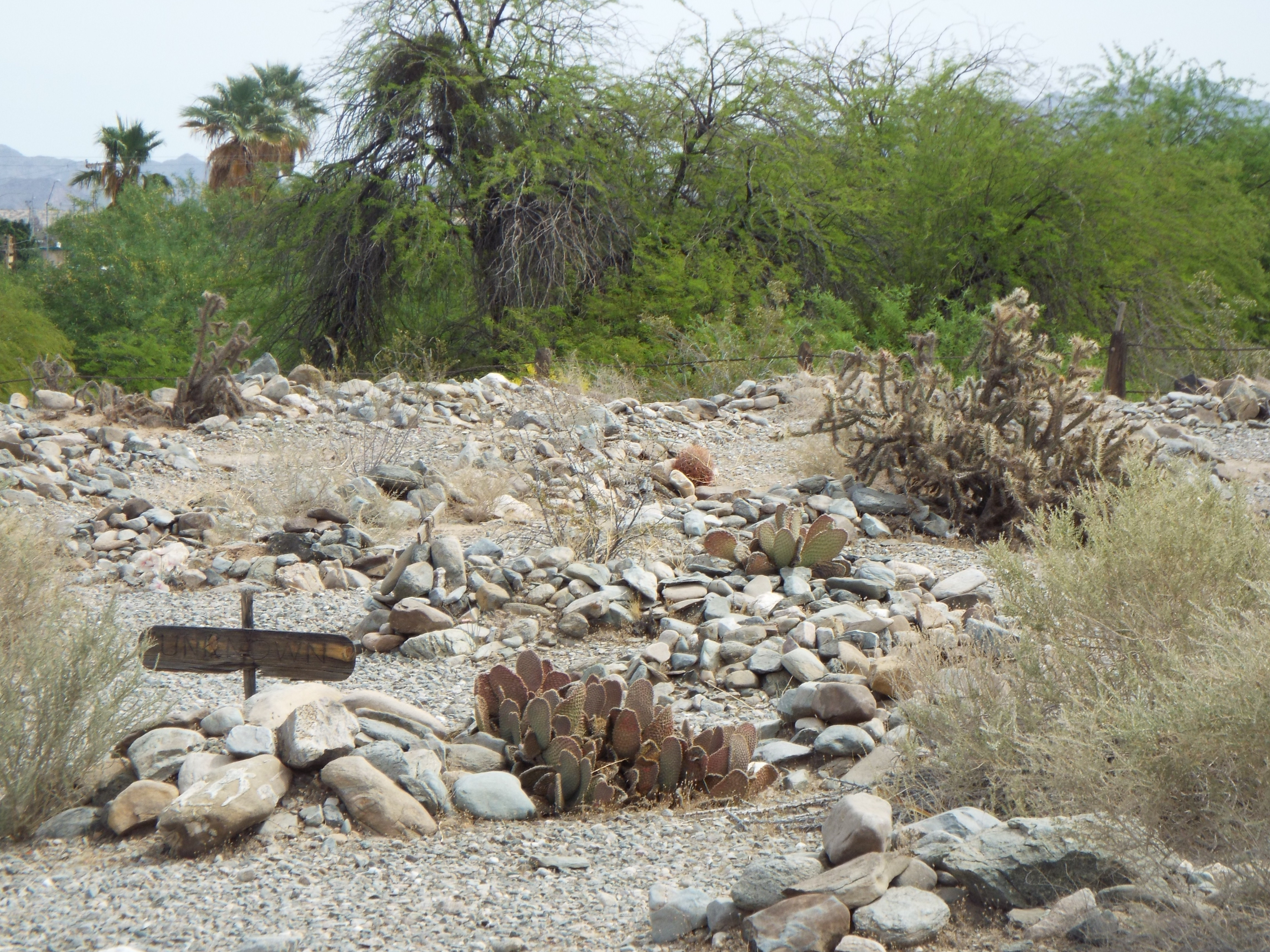
  Ehrenberg Pioneer Cemetery unmarked graves
  - Ehrenberg Cemetery
  - La Paz Cemetery
- Parker
  - Colorado River Indian Tribes Cemetery (CRIT)
  - Parker Cemetery
- Poston
  - Poston War Relocation Center Cemetery
- Quartzsite
  - Hi Jolly Monument
- Salome
  - Brown Family Cemetery
  - Cullings Well Cemetery
  - Dick Wick Hall grave (founder of Salome)
  - Jacobs & Bedford Gravesite
- Swamsea (ghost town)
  - Alamo Crossing Cemeteries (East & West)
  - Lopez Ranch Cemetery, Bill Williams River
- White Hills
  - Pioneer Cemetery
  - Swansea North Cemeteries (North & Couth)
- Vicksburg
  - Vicksburg Cemetery
  - Vicksburg Gravesite (Willie Stutts)
- Wendon
  - Fass Family Cemetery
  - Olea Ranch Cemetery, Alamo Lake (a.k.a. Three Rivers Ranch)
  - Wenden Cemetery
- No associated community or town (includes wilderness areas)
  - Clip Mine Cemetery
  - Cullings Well – former stagecoach stop with a nearby cemetery
  - Graves in the Dome Rock Mountains near Quartzsite
  - Harrisburg Cemetery
  - Hoge Ranch Gravesite
  - Kofa Cemetery
  - Nommel Place (site)
  - Norton's Landing
  - Planet Mine Cemetery
  - Red Cloud Mine
  - Utting Gravesite

== Maricopa ==
- Agua Caliente (ghost town)
  - Agua Caliente Cemetery
- Aguila
  - Eagle Eye Cemetery
  - Tom Walder Memorial Park
- Ahwatukee
  - Mountain View Lutheran Church Columbarium
  - Bosque Cemetery
- Fort McDowell
  - Fort McDowell Yavapai Nation Ba Dah Mod Jo Cemetery
- Gila Bend
  - Hee-A-Han Park
  - Pioneer Cemetery
  - Stout Cemetery
- Phoenix metropolitan area
  - Phoenix – state capital and largest city
    - All Saints Close at All Saints Episcopal Church (Est. 1976)
    - All Saints Lutheran Memorial Garden Columbarium
    - Arizona State Hospital, a.k.a. All Souls Cemetery, Phoenix & Asylum Cemetery (1888–1960s)
    - Beth Israel Cemetery, includes Beth Hebrew Cemetery (Est. c. 1903) and Workmans Circle Cemetery
    - Cementerio Lindo, a.k.a. Salt River Cemetery (1890–1952)
    - Church of the Beatitudes Columbarium
    - Cross Cut Cemetery, a.k.a. Williams-Crosscut Cemetery & Cactus Mound Cemetery (1884–1947)
    - Encanto Community Church Memorial Garden
    - Faith Lutheran Church Columbarium
    - First United Methodist Church Columbarium
    - Greenwood/Memory Lawn Mortuary & Cemetery
    - Greenwood Cemetery – Beth El Section (Est. c. 1937)
    - Hansen Desert Hills Cemetery (Est. 1977)
    - Holy Redeemer Catholic Cemetery (Est. 2000)
    - Mt. Sinai Cemetery
    - Mater Misericordiae Catholic Church
    - National Memorial Cemetery of Arizona
    - Orangewood Presbyterian Church Memorial Gardens
    - Papago Park – Hunt's Tomb Cemetery
    - Phoenix Memorial Park & Mortuary (Est. 1962)
    - Pioneer and Military Memorial Park (1871)
      - Contains the following cemeteries:
        - Ancient Order of United Workmen Cemetery (K.of.P. & A.O.U.W. section (1889–1914)
        - City Loosley Cemetery (1887–1914)
        - Independent Order of Odd Fellows Cemetery (I.O.O.F. section) (1884–1914)
        - Knights of Pythias Cemetery (K.of.P. & A.O.U.W. section) (1884–1914)
        - Masons Cemetery, a.k.a. Masonic Cemetery (1884–1914)
        - Porter Cemetery (1887–1914)
        - Rosedale Cemetery
    - Pioneer Living History Museum – has a western cemetery replica
    - Prince of Peace Lutheran Church Columbarium
    - Resthaven Park Cemetery (East)
    - Shadow Rock Congregational Church Cemetery
    - Shepherd of the Hills UCC Memorial Garden
    - Shepherd of the Valley Lutheran Church
    - Shepherd of the Valley United Methodist Church
    - Sotelo-Heard Cemetery, a.k.a. Heard Ranch Cemetery, Sotelo-Heard Ranch Cemetery, Across the River Cemetery & Mexican Cemetery – once a large cemetery, now abandoned
    - Stanfield Potters Field Cemetery
    - St. Francis Catholic Cemetery (Est. 1897)
    - St. Mary's Episcopal Church Cemetery
    - St. Stephen's Catholic Church and Columbarium (EST. 1968)
    - Trinity Episcopal Cathedral Columbarium
    - Trinity Lutheran Church Columbarium
    - Trinity United Methodist Church Memorial Garden
  - North Valley
    - Carefree
      - Christ Anglican Church Columbarium
      - Christ the Lord Lutheran Church Columbarium
    - Cave Creek
      - Boot Hill Cemetery
      - Cave Creek Memorial Arena Cemetery
  - East Valley
    - Chandler
      - Calvary Lutheran Church Columbarium
      - Goodyear–Ocotillo Cemetery (1920–1962)
      - Holy Trinity Lutheran Church Memory Gardens
      - Risen Savior Lutheran Church Columbarium
      - Saint Matthew's Episcopal Church Memorial Garden
      - Valley of the Sun Memorial Park Cemetery, a.k.a. Gardens of Peace Cemetery (Dignity Memorial)
    - Fountain Hills
      - Christ's Church of Fountain Hills Columbarium
      - Fountain Hills Presbyterian Church Columbarium
      - Shepherd of the Hills Lutheran Church Columbarium
      - The Fountains Memorial Garden and Columbarium
      - Trinity Lutheran Church Columbarium
    - Guadalupe (Tempe)
      - Guadalupe Cemetery (Est. c. 1904)
    - Mesa
      - Apache Wells Community Church Columbarium
      - Church of the Transfiguration Columbarium
      - City of Mesa Cemetery (Est. 1891)
      - Desert Haven Columbarium, a.k.a. Red Mountain UMC Desert Haven Columbarium
      - First Evangelical Lutheran Church Memorial Garden
      - First Presbyterian Church of Mesa Columbarium
      - First United Methodist Church of Mesa Columbarium
      - Love of Christ Lutheran Church Columbarium
      - Mariposa Gardens Memorial Park Cemetery
      - Mountain View Funeral Home and Cemetery (Est. 1952)
      - Presbyterian Church of the Master Columbarium
      - Queen of Heaven Catholic Cemetery (Est. 1978)
      - Saint Mark's Episcopal Church Columbarium
      - Velda Rose Garden
      - Victory Lutheran Church Memorial Garden
    - Paradise
      - Ascension Lutheran Church Memorial Garden
      - Camelback Cemetery, a.k.a. Old Scottsdale Cemetery, Scottsdale Cemetery (Est. 1916)
      - Christ Church of the Ascension Memory Garden
      - Paradise Valley Methodist Church Columbarium
      - Saint Barnabas on the Desert Memorial Garden
      - Unitarian Universalist Congregation of Phoenix
      - Valley Presbyterian Church Memorial Garden
    - Queen Creek
      - San Tan Memorial Gardens Cemetery
    - Rio Verde
      - Rio Verde Memorial Gardens, Community Church of the Verdes
    - Scottsdale
      - Alcor Life Extension Foundation (Est. 1972)
      - Chaparral Christian Church Memorial Garden (The Commons on Shea)
      - Desert Foothills Lutheran Church Memorial Garden
      - Desert Hills Presbyterian Church Memorial Garden
      - Green Acres Mortuary & Cemetery (Est. 1957)
      - Hansens Desert Hills Memorial Park and Mortuary, a.k.a. Desert Hills Memorial Park Cemetery
      - La Casa de Cristo Lutheran Church Memorial Garden
      - Living Water Lutheran Church Columbarium
      - Mountain View Presbyterian Church Memorial Garden
      - North Scottsdale UMC Memorial Garden
      - Paradise Memorial Gardens Cemetery
      - Pinnacle Presbyterian Church Memorial Garden
      - Saint Anthony on the Desert Church Columbarium
      - Scottsdale United Methodist Church Memorial Garden
      - Taliesin West Burial Site
    - Tempe
      - Desert Cross Lutheran Church Columbarium
      - Desert Palm United Church of Christ Columbarium
      - Dorman Ranch Cemetery
      - Double Butte Cemetery, a.k.a. Tempe Double Butte Cemetery, Double Butte Cemetery, Tempe Cemetery (NRHP-listed) – has many notable burials (Est. 1884)
      - Episcopal Church of the Epiphany Columbarium
      - First United Methodist Church Memorial Garden
      - Gethsemane Lutheran Church Memorial Garden
      - Mission del Sol Presbyterian Church Columbarium
      - Petersen Park
      - Reaves Family Cemetery
      - Saint Augustines Episcopal Church Columbarium
      - Saint James Episcopal Church Memorial Garden
      - Twin Buttes Cemetery, a.k.a. Potter's field (1952–1994) (Maricopa County managed)
      - University Presbyterian Church Memorial Garden
    - Sun Lakes
      - Sun Lakes Methodist Church Columbarium (Est. 1991)
  - West Valley
    - Avondale
      - Goodyear Farms Historic Cemetery
      - Holy Cross Cemetery (Est. 1964)
    - Buckeye
      - Buckeye Cemetery
      - Louis B Hazelton Cemetery (Est. 1938)
      - Palo Verde Cemetery
    - El Mirage
      - Heath Grave
      - Sunwest Cemetery & Crematorium
    - Glendale
      - Arrowhead Memorial Gardens & Mortuary of Joy (Est. 1999)
      - Cemetery of Spiritual Christians from Russia
      - Glendale Memorial Park Cemetery (Est. 1895)
      - Resthaven Park Cemetery, Glendale (West)
      - Russian Spiritual Christians Cemetery, a.k.a. Molokan Cemetery
      - Trinity Mennonite Church Columbarium
    - Goodyear
      - Christ Presbyterian Church Columbarium
      - Snaketown Cemetery
      - White Tanks Cemetery (Maricopa County Cemetery) (Est. 1994)
    - Litchfield
      - Church at Litchfield Park Garden of Memories
      - Saint Peters Episcopal Church Columbarium
    - Palo Verde
      - Palo Verde Baptist Church Cemetery (Est. 1903)
    - Peoria
      - Johnny Osuna Memorial Park Cemetery
    - Sun City – includes Sun City, Sun City West, Sun City Grand
      - Sunland Memorial Park & Mortuary
    - Surprise
      - Mission Home Cemetery
      - The Cemetery Club
- Harqua Hala (ghost town)
  - Harquahala Cemetery
  - Harquahala Mine Cemetery
- Heber-Overgaard
  - Heber-Overgaard Cemetery
- Kaka
  - New Kaka Cemetery
- Lehi (Mesa)
  - Lehi Cemetery (Est. 1913) Salt River, Maricopa Pima Indian Community
- Liberty (Buckeye)
  - Liberty Cemetery (1892–1962)
- Maricopa Village
  - Co-op Cemetery
- Mobile
  - Galilee Baptist Church Cemetery, a.k.a. Mobile Cemetery
- Morristown
  - Morristown Cemetery
  - Palm Lake Cemetery
- Oatman, Arizona (ghost town)
  - Oatman Massacre Cemetery and Four Ranch Cemetery
- Rio Verde
  - St. Francis of Assisi Catholic Church Cemetery
- San Domingo Wash
  - San Domingo Wash gravesites
- San Lucy Village
  - San Lucy Cemetery
- Vulture City
  - Vulture City Cemeteries
  - Vulture City Pioneer Cemetery, a.k.a. Verde Flat Cemetery
  - Vulture Mine graves (scattered on mine property
- Weedville (Glendale)
  - Weedville Cemetery, a.k.a. Old Paths Cemetery (Est. 1921)
- Wickenburg has various cemeteries and burial sites, including:
  - Boetto House Cemetery (George Gibbs Memorial)
  - Brill Branch Cemetery, a.k.a. Martin Family Gravesite, Hassayampa River Preserve
  - Flying E Ranch – Graves
  - Garcia Cemetery (a.k.a. Old Garcia Cemetery) (Est. 1863)
  - Henry Wickenburg Pioneer Cemetery, NRHP-listed in Maricopa County
  - Morristown Cemetery
  - Old Lumber Yard Cemetery
  - Old Wickenburg Pioneer Cemetery
  - St. Alban's Episcopal Church – Memorial Garden
  - St. Anthony de Padua Catholic Church – Columbarium
  - Sols Wash – Burial Ground/Cemetery
  - Stone Park Cemetery
  - Wickenburg Municipal Cemetery (Est. 1931)
- Wittmann
  - Wittman Cemetery
- No associated community or town (includes wilderness areas)
  - Al Rahma Muslim Cemetery
  - Bixby Cemetery
  - Brunner Ranch Cemetery
  - Camino del Sol Memorial Columbarium Cemetery
  - Crown of Life Lutheran Church Columbarium Cemetery
  - Hieroglyphic Mountains Grave
  - Piedra Cemetery
  - Richardson/Fierra Homestead Cemetery
  - Thompson Cemetery, a.k.a. Sleeping Bride Cemetery
  - Wamsley Cemetery

== Mohave ==
- Beaver Dam
  - Beaver Dam Cemetery
- Bill Williams River National Wildlife Refuge
  - Esquerra Ranch Cemetery
- Buck Mountains
  - Yucca Mine Graves
- Bullhead City
  - Fort Mojave Post Cemetery
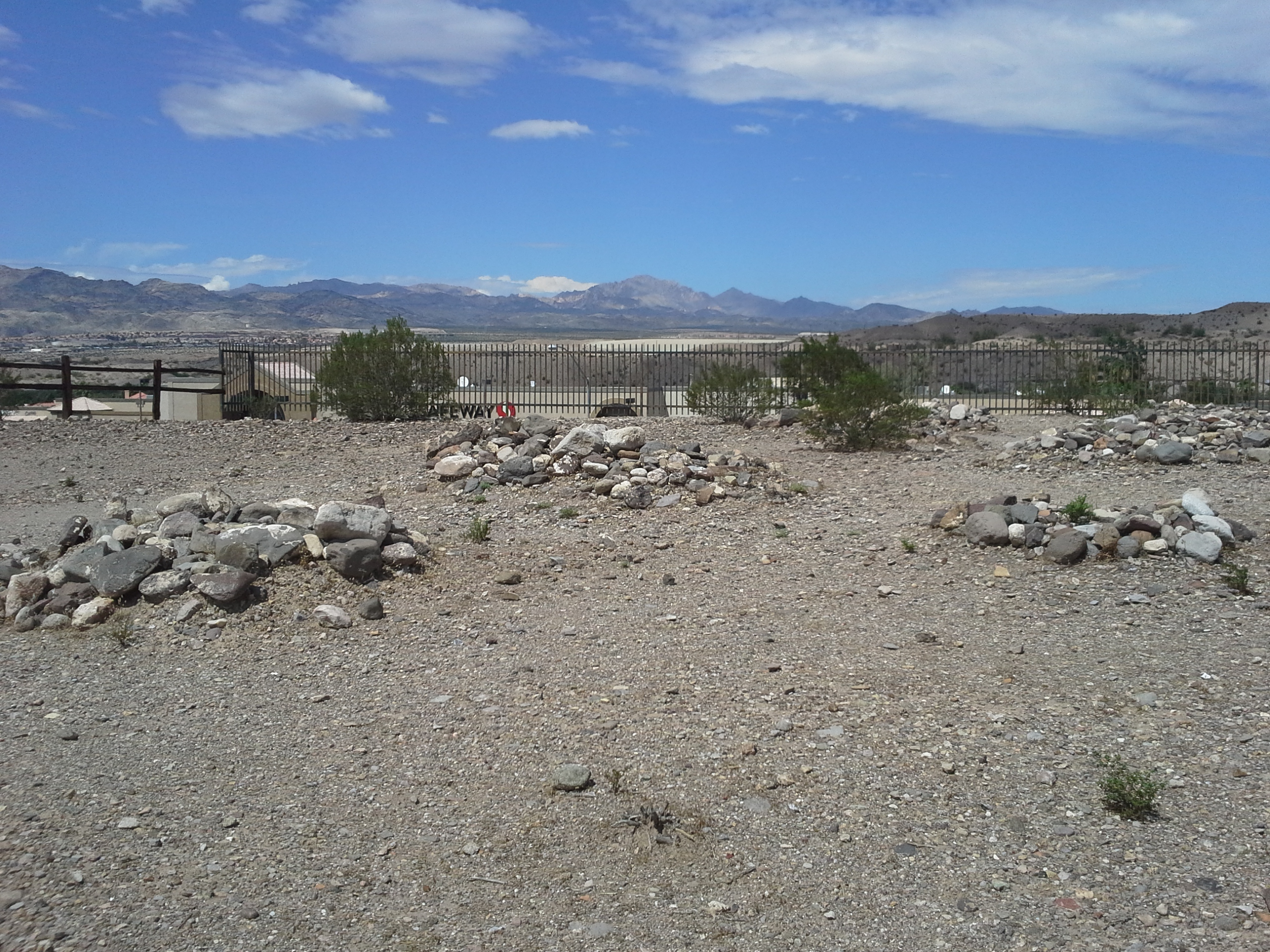
    Hardyville Cemetery
  - Hardyville Cemetery (NRHP-listed)
  - Wisniewski Family Grave
- Cane Beds
  - Black Family Cemetery
  - Cox Family Cemetery, a.k.a. Cane Beds Cemetery
  - Dutson Family Cemetery
  - Finicum Family Cemetery
  - J W Black Memorial Cemetery
  - LeBaron Family Cemetery
  - Spur Ranch Cemetery
- Cedar
  - Cedar Cemetery
- Centennial Park
  - Centennial Park Cemetery
  - Terra Verde Memorial Gardens
- Cerbat (ghost town)
  - Cerbat cemetery
- Chloride (ghost town)
  - Chloride cemetery, a.k.a. Silver Hill Cemetery
  - Chloride gravesite nearby
- Colorado
  - Cane Beds Cemetery
  - Hammon Cemetery
  - Isaac W. Carling Memorial Park
  - Short Creek Cemetery
- Fort Mohave
  - Fort Mohave Cemetery
  - Mohave Valley Cemetery
- Franconia
  - Franconia Cemetery
- Golconda (mine and ghost town)
  - Golconda Cemetery
- Goldroad (ghost town)
  - Goldroad Cemetery (near Oatman)
- Hackberry
  - Hackberry Cemetery, a.k.a. The Willows Cemetery
- Kaibab
  - Kaibab Paiute Tribe Cemetery
- Kingman
  - Camp Beale Springs Cemetery
  - Grace Lutheran Church Columbarium and Memorial Garden
  - Mountain View Cemetery
  - Pioneer Cemetery
- Lake Havasu City
  - Community Presbyterian Church Columbarium
  - Grace Episcopal Memorial Garden
  - Lake Havasu Memorial Gardens
  - McCormies Family Cemetery
  - Mount Olive Lutheran Church Columbarium
- Litchfield
  - Littlefield Cemetery
- Mineral Park ghost town)
  - Mineral Park Cemetery
- Moccasin
  - Moccasin Cemetery
- Mohave Valley
  - Desert Lawn Funeral Home, Crematory, and Memorial Park
- Mount Trumbull
  - Mount Trumbull Cemetery
  - William H. Noakes Gravesite
- Oatman (ghost town)
  - Gold Road Cemetery
  - Oatman Cemetery
- Peach Springs
  - McGee Family Cemetery
  - Peach Springs Cemetery
  - Peach Springs Indian Burial Ground
- Penn's Valley
  - Snyder Family Cemetery
- Signal (ghost town)
  - Palmerita Ranch Fass-Valensuela Family Cemetery (gravesites)
  - Signal cemetery/gravesite (intact)
  - Signal Chinese Gravesite
  - Signal Mexican Cemetery
- Sunshine Ridge
  - Hancock Family Cemetery
- Tuweep (ghost town)
  - Riffey Burial Site
- Valentine
  - Valentine Cemetery
  - Valentine Indian Cemetery
- White Hills (ghost town)
  - White Hills Cemetery
- Wikieup
  - Davis Ranch Cemetery
  - Masten Family Cemetery
  - Noli Cemetery (Noli gravesites)
  - Sandy Cemetery
  - Wikieup Indian Cemetery
  - Wikieup Mexican Cemetery
- Yucca
  - Lopez Ranch Cemetery
  - Yucca Cemetery
- No associated community or town (includes wilderness areas)
  - Banegas Ranch Cemetery
  - Big Sandy Cemetery
  - Burned Mill Cemetery
  - Carrow/Stephens Ranch Cemetery
  - Democrat Mine Grave
  - Frees Wash Graves
  - Gold Basin Cemetery
  - Horse Valley Ranch Cemetery
  - Lord Property
  - Meadow Cemetery
  - Rojas Cemetery
  - Sandy Valley Gravesites
  - Swansea Pumping Station Site Cemetery
  - Stevens Ranch Cemetery
  - Van Marter Cemetery

== Navajo ==
- Aripine
  - Grant Roadside Grave
- Bacavi
  - Bacavi Community Cemetery
- Cedar Springs
  - Cedar Springs Cemetery
- Chilchinbeto
  - Chilchinbito Community Cemetery, Navajo Nation
- Cibecue
  - Cibecue Northwest Cemetery (White Mountain Apache Tribe Reservation)
  - Evergreen Cemetery
  - Forestdale Cemetery (White Mountain Apache Tribe Reservation)
  - Mountain Shadow Cemetery (White Mountain Apache Tribe Reservation)
  - Nachu Family Cemetery
  - Open Range Cemetery (White Mountain Apache Tribe Reservation)
  - Red Mountain Ridge Cemetery
  - Salt Creek Cemetery (White Mountain Apache Tribe Reservation)
  - Sandy Rock Cemetery
  - Sunnyside Cemetery (White Mountain Apache Tribe Reservation)
  - Sunset Cemetery (White Mountain Apache Tribe Reservation)
- Clay Springs
  - Clay Springs Cemetery
  - Perkins Family Cemetery
  - Smith Family Ranch Cemetery
- Dilkon
  - Dilkon Community Cemetery (Navajo Nation Reservation)
  - Long Family Cemetery
- East Fork
  - Bush Flat Cemetery, a.k.a. Dove Road Cemetery (Fort Apache Reservation of the White Mountain Apaches)
  - Manzanita Cemetery (Fort Apache Reservation of the White Mountain Apaches)
  - Mission View Cemetery (White Mountain Apache Indian Reservation)
- Greasewood
  - Greasewood Community Cemetery
  - Lower Greasewood Cemetery
- Hard Rocks
  - Hard Rock Cemetery, a.k.a. Hard Rock Mission Church Cemetery
- Heber
  - Baca Family Cemetery
  - Baca Ranch and Baca Cemeteries (one and two)
  - Hangman Trail Burial Ground
  - Heber Cemetery
  - Micki burial site
  - Yates Family Walnut Ranch Cemetery
- Holbrook
  - Geronimo/Kempton
  - H-Y Ranch Family Cemetery
  - Holbrook Cemeteries (north and south)
  - Seventh Day Adventist Mission Cemetery
- Indian Wells
  - Indian Wells Community Cemetery
- Jeddito
  - Jeddito Community Cemetery
- Joseph City
  - Hunt Family Cemetery
  - Joseph City Cemetery
  - Kempton Gravesite
- Kayenta
  - Grey Point Family Burial Site
  - Kayenta Community Cemetery
  - Oakridge Cemetery
  - Wetherill Cemetery
- Keams Canyon
  - Keams Canyon Community Cemetery
- Kykotsmovi
  - Kykotsmovi Village Cemetery
- Lake of the Woods
  - Lakeside Cemetery
- Linden
  - Frost Family Cemetery
- North Fork
  - Chiefton Cemetery (White Mountain Apache Tribe Reservation)
- Oraibi
  - Oraibi Village Cemetery (Hopi Tribe Reservation)
- Overgaard
  - Overgaard Baby Cemetery
- Pinedale
  - Pinedale Cemetery
- Pinetop-Lakeside
  - Episcopal Church Of Our Saviour Columbarium
  - Lakeside Cemetery
  - Phipps Grave
  - Pinetop Cemetery
  - Saint Marys Angels Rest Columbarium, a.k.a. Saint Mary of the Angels Church Columbarium
- Pinon
  - Pinon Cemetery
  - Whippoorwill Community Cemetery
- Polacca
  - Tewa Cemetery, a.k.a. First Mesa Cemetery, Polacca Tewa Cemetery
  - Tootsie Family Cemetery
- Second Mesa
  - Shungopavi Cemetery (Hopi Tribe Reservation)
  - Sipaulovi Cemetery (Hopi Tribe Reservation)
- Shonto
  - Shonto Cemetery, a.k.a. Cowsprings Cemetery
- Show Low
  - Adair Cemetery, 22nd Avenue and Old Linden Road
  - Conklin Gravesite
  - Golden Gorge Family Cemetery
  - R. V. "Mike" Ramsey Memorial Cemetery
  - Show Low Cemetery
- Shumway
  - Love Lake Ranch Cemetery
  - Shumway Pioneer Cemetery
- Silver Creek
  - Silver Creek Cemetery
- Snowflake
  - R V Mike Ramsay Memorial Cemetery, a.k.a. Also known as Snowflake Cemetery
- Sunset
  - Pioneer Cemetery, Homolovi Ruins State Park, near Winslow
- Taylor
  - Taylor Cemetery, a.k.a. Reed S. Hatch Memorial Cemetery
- Whiteriver
  - Bush Flat Cemetery
  - Fort Apache Indian Reservation
  - Seven Mile Cemetery
  - Whiteriver Cemetery (White Mountain Apache Indian Reservation)
- Winslow
  - Birdsprings Community Cemetery
  - Brigham City Cemetery, a.k.a. Ballengers Camp Cemetery
  - Desert View Cemetery
  - Round Cedar Cemetery
  - Sunset Cemetery, a.k.a. LDS Pioneer Cemetery, Mormon Pioneer Cemetery
  - Whipple Memorial Park
  - Winslow (Navajo) Cemetery
  - Winslow Desert View Cemetery
  - Winslow Indian Sanatorium Cemetery
- Woodruff
  - Woodruff City Cemetery
- No associated community or town (includes wilderness areas)
  - Ahshii Hii Family Plot
  - Baird Family Cemetery
  - Black Mesa Cemetery
  - Burton Cemetery
  - Cedar Shade Family Cemetery
  - Chief Alchesay Baha Grave, Alchesay Flat
  - Chiefton Alchesay Cemetery
  - Cooley Mountain Cemetery, a.k.a. Cooley Family Cemetery
  - Elephant Butte Family Plot
  - Family Cemetery
  - Hill Top Cemetery
  - Hotevilla Cemetery
  - McCamant-McCauley Family Cemetery (West Chevelon Canyon)
  - Oljato-Monument Valley Cemetery
  - Running Water Cemetery
  - Sevenmile Cemetery (White Mountain Apache Indian Reservation)
  - Stott, Scott & Wilson Cemetery
  - Smoke Signal Family Cemetery
  - Solid Rock Cemetery
  - Spires Family Cemetery
  - Taipa Cemetery
  - Whipple Memorial Park

== Pima ==
- Ajo
  - Ajo Cemetery
  - Ajo Peak Cemetery
  - Childs Cemetery, a.k.a. Ten Mile Ranch Cemetery
  - Darby Wells Cemetery
  - Quitobaquito Cemetery, a.k.a. Organ Pipe Burials (Organ Pipe Cactus National Monument)
  - Stua Bidag Cemetery
- Ak Chin
  - Ak Chin Cemetery
- Ali Ak Chin
  - Menagers Dam Cemetery
- Ali Molina
  - Little Tucson Cemetery
- Arivaca (ghost town)
  - Arivaca Cemetery
  - Moyza Ranch Road Cemetery
  - Palo Alto Ranch Cemetery
- Arivaca Junction
  - Arivaca Junction Cemetery
- Catalina
  - Mountain Shadows Presbyterian Church Memorial Garden
- Chico Shunie
  - Chico Shunie Ranch Cemetery
- Chiuli Shaik
  - Fresnal Canyon Cemetery (Tohono O'odham Nation Reservation)
- Choulic
  - Choulic Village Cemetery (Tohono O'odham Indian Reservation)
- Continental
  - Continental Cemetery
- Cortaro
  - Rillito Ranch Cemetery, a.k.a. Cortaro Cemetery
- Cowlic
  - Cowlic Cemetery
- Eagle Creek
  - Eagle Creek Cemetery
- Emika
  - Emika Cemetery (Tohono O'Odham Nation Reservation)
- Fort Lowell (Tucson, Arizona)
  - Camp Lowell Post Cemetery (defunct)
  - Fort Lowell Post Cemetery (1881–1891)
  - Fort Lowell Cemetery (actively receiving burials)
- Galleta Flat
  - White Cross Cemetery
- Gilbert
  - Gilbert Memorial Park
- Greaterville (ghost town)
  - Greaterville Cemetery – not maintained
- Green Valley
  - Desert Hills Lutheran Church Columbarium
  - La Posada Columbarium – La Posada Central Park
  - Lutheran Church of the Risen Savior Columbarium
  - McGee Ranch Cemetery
  - Morales Family Cemetery
  - Nelson Sawyer Cemetery
  - Saint Francis Episcopal Church Memorial Garden
  - Saint Francis-in-the-Valley Episcopal Church Columbarium
  - United Methodist Church of Green Valley Memorial Garden
  - Valley Presbyterian Church Columbarium
- Gu Vo
  - Gu-Vo Village Cemetery (Tohono O'odham Indian Reservation)
- Haivana Nakya
  - Haivana Nakya Cemetery (Crow Hanging Village, a.k.a. Crow Hang Village)
- Helvetia (ghost town)
  - Helvetia Cemetery
- Hickiwan
  - Hickiwan Cemetery (Tohono O'Odham Nation Reservation)
- Maish Vaya
  - Maish Vaya Village Cemetery (Tohono O'odham Reservation)
- Marana
  - Arizona Veterans' Memorial Cemetery, Arizona Department of Veterans' Services
  - Marana Mortuary and Cemetery
- Nolic
  - Nolic Cemetery
- Oro Valley
  - Church of the Apostles Cemetery
  - Oro Valley United Church of Christ Memorial Garden
  - Resurrection Lutheran Church Memorial Garden
- Pantano
  - Historic railroad station with cemetery nearby
- Pisinemo
  - Pisinemo Village Cemetery (Tohono O'odham Nation Reservation)
- Redington
  - Bayless Ranch Cemetery, a.k.a. Ronquillo Family Cemetery
- Rincon Creek
  - Rincon Creek Grave
- Sahurita
  - Good Shepherd United Church of Christ Columbarium
  - Green Valley Cemetery
  - Kilgore Family Cemetery
- San Miguel
- San Miguel Cemetery
- Santa Rosa
  - Castillo Family Cemetery
- Sasabe
  - Garcia Ranch Cemetery
- Schuchuli
  - Gunsight Cemetery (Tohono O'Odham Nation Reservation)
- Sells
  - Big Fields Cemetery
  - Coldfields Cemetery
  - Comely Cemetery
  - Crow Hang Cemetery
  - Iron Pipe Cemetery
  - North Komelik Village Cemetery (Tohono O'odham Indian Reservation)
  - Papago Baptist Church Cemetery
  - Presbyterian Cemetery
  - Red Well Cemetery
  - Saint Simon Cemetery (Tohono O'odham Reservation)
  - Sells Cemetery (Tohono O'odham Nation Reservation)
- Sikul Himatk
  - Sikul Himatk Cemetery
- Sil Nakya
  - Sil Nakya Cemetery
- Silver Bell
  - Silverbell Cemeteries (Center and South)
- South Komelik
  - South Komelik Cemetery
- Stoa Pitk
  - Stoa Pitk Cemetery
- Tanque Verde
  - Tanque Verde Cemetery
- Three Points
  - King's Rendondo Memorial
- Total Wreck (ghost town)
  - Total Wreck Cemetery
- Topawa
  - Komlic Cemetery
  - St. Catherine's Mission cemetery
  - Topawa Village Cemetery (Tohono O'odham Indian Reservation)
- Tucson
  - Aguilar Ranch Cemetery
  - Alameda-Stone Cemetery, a.k.a. National Cemetery (1860–1875)
  - All Faiths Memorial Park, a.k.a. Desert Vista Community Cemetery, Islamic Cemetery, Our Lady of the Desert Cemetery, Queen of all Saints Mausoleum, Shaarei Shalom Cemetery
  - Ascension Lutheran Church Memorial Garden
  - Beautiful Savior Lutheran Church Memorial Garden
  - Binghampton Cemetery, a.k.a. Old Pioneer LDS Cemetery
  - Casa Adobes Congregational Church Columbarium
  - Catalina United Methodist Church Memorial Garden
  - Cathedral of Saint Augustine Altar Crypt
  - Children's Memorial Park at Michael Perry Park
  - Children's Memorial Park at Rillito River Park
  - Christ Church United Methodist Memorial Garden (no burials)
  - Christ Presbyterian Church Memorial Garden (no burials)
  - Christ the King Episcopal Church Columbarium
  - Congregation Bet Shalom Cemetery
  - Court Street Cemetery, a.k.a. Tucson City Cemetery (1875–1909)
  - Degrazia Gallery – burial site of artist Ettore "Ted" DeGrazia (1909–1982)
  - Dove of Peace Lutheran Church Memorial Garden
  - East Lawn Palms Cemetery and Mortuary, a.k.a. Grantwood Memorial Park, Tucson Memorial Park East Lawn, Woodlawn Cemetery (Dignity Memorial)
  - Evergreen Memorial Park
  - First United Methodist Church Memorial Garden
  - Fountain of Life Lutheran Church Columbarium
  - Grace Saint Paul's Memorial Garden
  - Hebrew Cemetery
  - Holy Hope Cemetery and Mausoleum
  - Humphrey Family Cemetery
  - Immanuel Presbyterian Church Memorial Garden
  - Los Reales Cemetery
  - Lutheran Church of the Foothills Memorial Garden
  - Mission San Xavier del Bac Mausoleum
  - Monte Calvario Cemetery, a.k.a. New Pascua Yaqui Cemetery (Pascua Yaqui Tribe and Veteran Affairs funded)
  - Moreno Ranch Cemetery
  - Mormon Cemetery
  - Mount Zion Lutheran Church Memorial Garden
  - Mountain Shadows Presbyterian Memorial Garden
  - New Spirit Lutheran Church Columbarium
  - Northminster Presbyterian Church Cemetery
  - Our Saviour's Lutheran Church Memorial Garden
  - Pima County Cemetery
  - Presidio San Agustin del Tucson Cemetery (defunct)
  - Redemptorist Renewal Center
  - Rincon Cemetery
  - Rincon Congregational Church Columbarium
  - Saguaro Christian Church Memorial Garden
  - Saint Albans Episcopal Church Columbarium
  - Saint Andrews Episcopal Church Columbarium
  - Saint Andrews Presbyterian Church Memorial Garden
  - Saint James UMC Memorial Garden
  - Saint Mark's United Methodist Church Memorial Garden
  - Saint Marks Presbyterian Church Cemetery
  - Saint Matthew Episcopal Church Memorial Garden
  - Saint Michael and All Angels Episc. Church Garden
  - Saint Paul's Memorial Garden
  - Saint Philips in the Hills Church Columbarium
  - San Xavier Cemetery (San Xavier Indian Reservation)
  - Santa Rosa Cemetery (Santa Rosa Village, Indian Reservation)
  - South Lawn Memorial Cemetery (Dignity Memorial)
    - Ahmadiyya Muslim Cemetery
  - Tanque Verde Lutheran Church Columbarium
  - Tanque Verde Ranch Cemetery
  - Thurman Ranch Burials
  - Trinity Presbyterian Church Memorial Garden
  - Tucson Pioneer Evergreen Cemetery
  - Vista de la Montaña UMC Memorial Wall
- Twin Buttes
  - Twin Buttes Cemetery (ghost town)
- Vail
  - Leon Cemetery a.k.a. Bravo-Leon Family Cemetery
  - Shrine of Santa Rita
  - Vail Children's Cemetery
  - Via Rancho Del Lago Roadside Graves
- Vamori
  - Vamori Village Cemetery (Tohono O'odham Nation Reservation)
- Ventana
  - Ventana Village Cemetery (Tohono O'odham Indian Reservation)
- No associated community or town (includes wilderness areas)
  - Anegam Cemetery
  - Anvil Ranch Cemetery
  - Binghamton LDS Cemetery
  - Cerro Colorado Cemetery
  - Child's Ranch Cemetery
  - Edward Abbey (1927–1989) Gravesite
  - E K Ranch Burial Site (Tohono O'odham Nation)
  - Gamez Family Cemetery
  - Haivana Nakya Cemetery
  - McGee Family Cemetery
  - Moreno-Escalante Family Cemetery
  - Pennington Cemetery
  - Ruiz Family Cemetery
  - Samaniego Ranch Cemetery
  - San Xavier del Bac Chapel Cemetery
  - Santa Rosa Francisco Cemetery
  - Sopori Ranch Cemetery
  - Tappan Ranch Cemetery
  - Wasp Canyon Burial
  - White Mud Cemetery

== Pinal ==
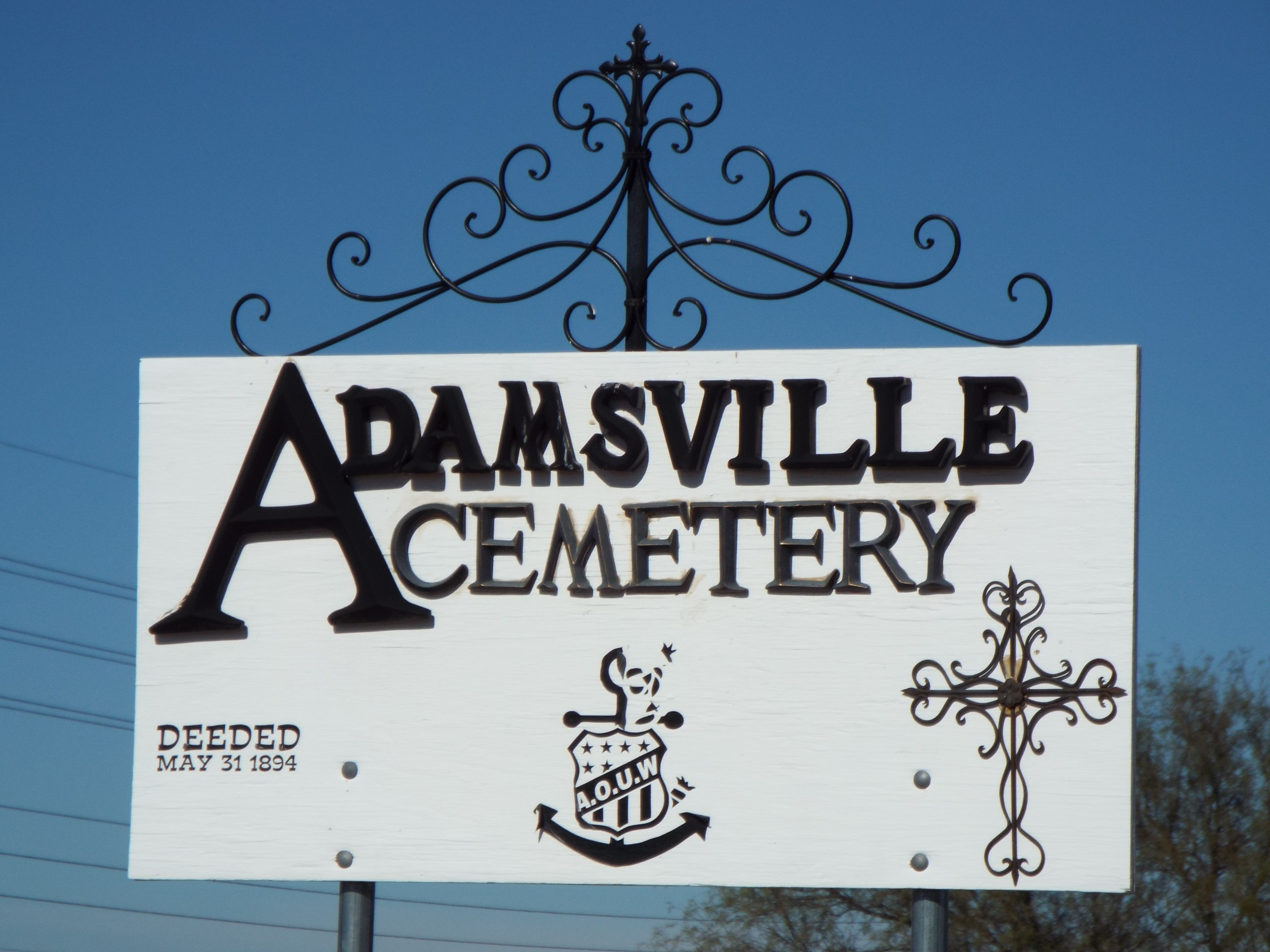

- Adamsville
  - Adamsville A.O.U.W. Cemetery
- Ak-Chin Indian Community
  - Ak-Chin Cemetery
- Apache Junction
  - Goldfield Ghost Town Cemetery
  - Mountain View Lutheran Church Columbarium
- Arizona City
  - Coot's Chapel
  - Odd Fellow's Rest
- Bapchule
  - Bapchule Cemetery
  - Saint Peters Cemetery
- Bates Canyon, Arizona
  - Bates Canyon Cemetery
- Blackwater
  - Blackwater Cemetery, a.k.a. Blackwater Westside Cemetery and West Blackwater Cemetery
  - Holy Family Catholic Cemetery
  - North Blackwater Cemetery
  - Squawbush Cemetery
- Blake Place, Arizona
  - Holyfaith Cemetery
- Butte View, Arizona
  - Butte View Cemetery
- Camp Grant
  - Camp Grant Massacre graves
- Casa Blanca
  - Vah-Ki Cemetery, a.k.a. West Casa Blanca Cemetery
- Casa Grande
  - Mountain View Cemetery
  - Weaver Pioneer Cemetery
- Chuichu
  - Chuichu North Cemetery
  - Chuichu South Cemetery
- Coolidge
  - Valley Memorial Park,
- Copper Creek (ghost town)
  - Copper Creek Site
- Dudleyville
  - Dudleyville Cemetery
- Eloy
  - Eloy Memorial Park
- Florence
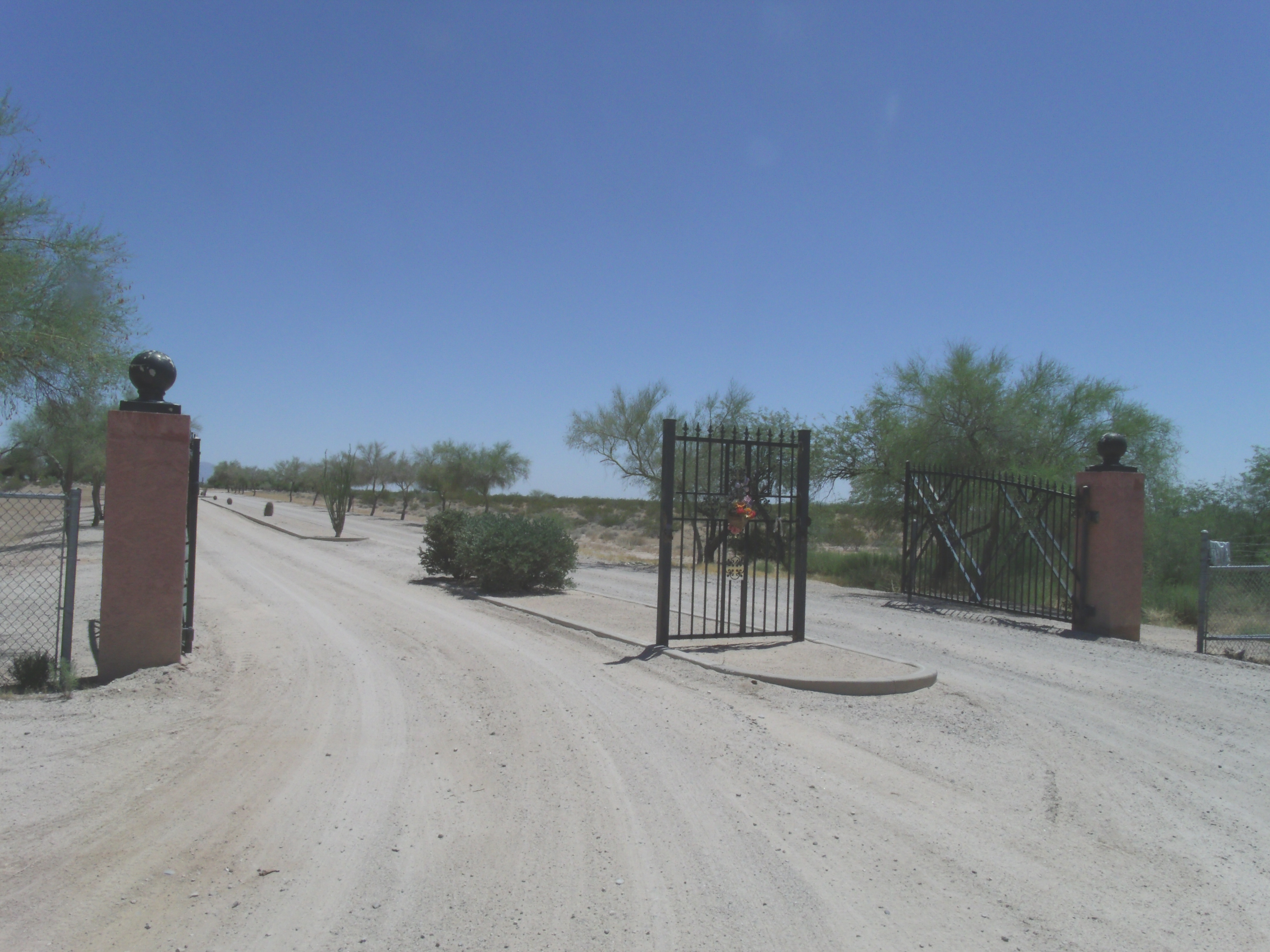
  Entrance of the Florence Cemetery
  - Arizona State Prison Cemetery
  - Florence Cemetery
- Globe Cemetery
- Hayden Junction/Burns Station Cemetery
- Hilltop Cemetery
- Kearney
  - Kearny Memorial Cemetery
  - Kelvin Cemetery
- Mammoth Cemeteries
- Mammoth Valley View Cemetery
- McKinney Cemetery, Mammoth
- Oracle
  - Oracle Cemetery
- Pinal (ghost town)
  - Pinal Cemetery
- Poston Butte – Grave of Charles Debrille Poston (1825–1902)
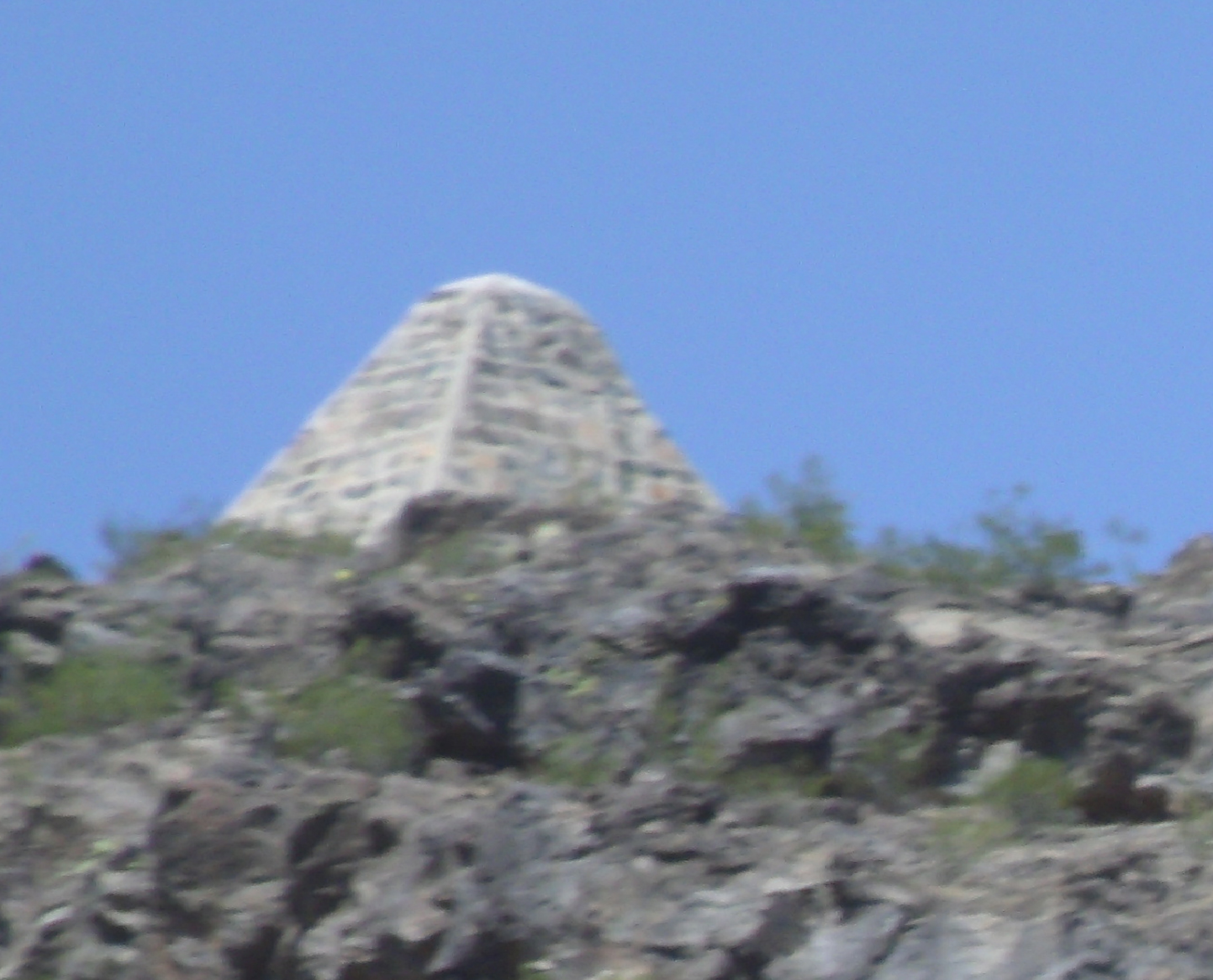
  Pyramid Tomb of Charles Debrille Poston, "The Father of Arizona"
- Ray (ghost town)
  - Ray Memorial Cemetery
- Reevis Grave
- Ripsey Wash (A-Diamond Ranch) Cemetery
- Sasco (ghost town)
  - Sasco Cemetery
- Sacaton Cemetery
- Silver King Mine (ghost town)
  - Silver King Cemetery
- South Adamsville Cemetery
- St. Ann's Cemetery
- Superior
  - Fairview Cemetery
  - Superior Cemetery
- Troy
  - Troy Townsite Cemetery
- Vaiva Vo
  - Cockleburr Cemetery
- Valley View Cemetery
- V S Ranch Cemetery
- Weaver
  - Weaver Pioneer Cemetery
- No associated community or town (includes wilderness areas)
  - La Osa Ranch Cemetery

== Santa Cruz ==
- Alto
  - Alto Cemetery
- Amado
  - Amado Cemetery
- Calabasas
  - Tellos-Ramos-Espinosa-Lopez Burial Site
- Camp Crittenden (ghost town)
  - Camp Crittenden Site
- Canelo
  - Bartell Canelo Ranch Cemetery
  - Black Oak Cemetery
- Duquesne
  - Duquesne Cemetery
  - Duquesne-Washington Camp Cemetery
- Elgin
  - Elgin Cemetery
  - Fruitland Cemetery, Homesteader Plot Cemetery
- Harshaw
  - Harshaw Cemetery
  - Harshaw Cemetery South
  - Harshaw Mexican Cemetery
  - Harshaw Village Cemetery
  - James Nations Gravesite
- Lochiel (ghost town)
  - Enriquito de la Ossa Gravesite
  - Harrison San Rafael Valley Burial Site
- Madera Canyon
  - Madera Canyon Gravesites
  - Whitehouse Gravesite
- Nogales
  - Calabasas Cemetery
  - City of Nogales Cemetery
  - Ione Marcus Gordon Memorial Park
  - Saint Andrews Columbarium
  - Saint Joseph's Hospital Burial Grounds
- Old Glory
  - California Gulch Cemetery
  - Oro Blanco (ghost town)
  - Oro Blance Cemetery
- Otero
  - Otero Cemetery
- Patagonia
  - Cunaro Canyon Gravesite
  - Gatlin Jones Cemetery
  - Parker Canyon Cemetery
  - Patagonia Cemetery
- Rio Rico
  - Santa Cruz School Grounds Cemetery
- Ruby (ghost town)
  - Ruby Cemetery
  - Ruby Gravesites
  - Scribner Cemetery
- Tubac
  - Chapel of Santa Gertrudis
  - Chavez Cemetery
  - Salero Ranch Cemetery
  - Tubac Cemetery
  - Tubac Village Cemetery
- Tumacacori
  - Mission Tumacácori National Historical Park Cemetery
  - Saint Josephs Cemetery
- No associated community or town (includes wilderness areas)
  - El Oro Cemetery
  - Lochiel
  - Meigs Ranch Cemetery
  - Mission Los Santos Angeles de Guevavi
  - Mowry Cemetery and Orton Phelps Grave, see Mowry massacres
  - Mudbank Cemetery
  - Old Nogales Cemetery
  - Patagonia
  - Phelps Gravesite
  - Smith Family Cemetery
  - Watkins Family Cemetery

== Yavapai ==
- Ashfork
  - Ashfork Settlers Cemetery, a.k.a. Ash Fork Cemetery
- Bagdad
  - Galena Silver Mine Camp Burial Site
  - Santa Maria Cemetery, a.k.a. Ferra Cemetery, four graves of the Ferra Family
- Black Canyon City
  - Albins Family Memorial Park
  - Black Canyon City Municipal Memorial Park
- Bradshaw City (ghost town)
  - Bradshaw City Cemetery
- Camp Verde
  - Clear Creek Cemetery
  - Fort Verde Cemetery
  - Middle Verde Cemetery
  - Middle Verde Yavapai–Apache Cemetery (Yavapai–Apache Nation)
  - Squaw Peak Cemetery
- Centerville, Arizona
  - Centerville Cemetery – Abandoned
- Cherry (ghost town)
  - Cherry Cemetery (Est. 1855/1866)
  - Cherry Cemetery #2
- Chino Valley
  - Chino Valley Cemetery (Est. 1922)
  - Del Rio Springs Cemetery
- Clarkdale
  - Jerome Valley Cemetery, a.k.a. Lower Jerome Cemetery
  - Saint Thomas Episcopal Church Columbarium (Church est. 1913)
  - Valley View Cemetery
- Cleator (ghost town)
  - H.P. Anderson Burial Site
- Columbia, (ghost town)
- Congress (ghost town)
  - Congress Cemetery (Est. 1887)
  - Congress Gravesite (William Miller & dog)
  - Williams Ranch Cemetery
- Constellation
  - Constellation Cemetery
- Copperopolis
  - Copperopolis Cemetery
- Cordes (ghost town)
  - Cordes Cemetery
- Cornville
  - Copple – Hayden Cemetery
  - Thompson Family Cemetery
- Cottonwood
  - All Souls Cemetery (Est. 2004)
  - Azteca Cemetery, a.k.a. Azteca Lodge Cemetery & Lopez Delfina Etal Dba Cemetery
  - Cottonwood Cemeteries (East and West) – historic cemetery is dated 1878–1938
  - Jerome Mine Laborers Cemetery
- Crown King (ghost town)
  - Bishop Family Cemetery
  - Crown King Cemetery
  - Kentuck Ranch Burial Site (Kentucks Grave)
  - Palace Station Cemetery
- Dead Horse Ranch State Park – Cemetery
- Dewey
  - Dewey Cemetery
  - Henderson Cemetery
  - Heritage Memorial Park, a.k.a. Redwood Memorial Gardens
  - May Family Memorials
- Drake
  - Cedar Glade Cemetery
  - Drake Cemetery
- Dugas
  - Dugas Cemetery
- Fort Misery (ghost town)
- George Washington Mine Graves
- Gilbert
  - Gilbert Cemetery – burials are documented but no grave exist
- Gillette (ghost town)
  - Gillette Cemetery
- Granite Dells
  - Boblitt Cemetery
  - Wilkinson Family Cemetery
- Harshaw, two cemeteries near the abandoned town
- Howells, ghost town with cemetery
- Humboldt
  - Henderson Cemetery
  - Humboldt Cemetery
- Humbug (ghost town)
  - Humbug Cemetery near the mining town
  - Champie Ranch Cemetery, a.k.a. Castle Hot Springs Cemetery
- Jerome
  - Jerome Cemetery, a.k.a., Hogback Cemetery
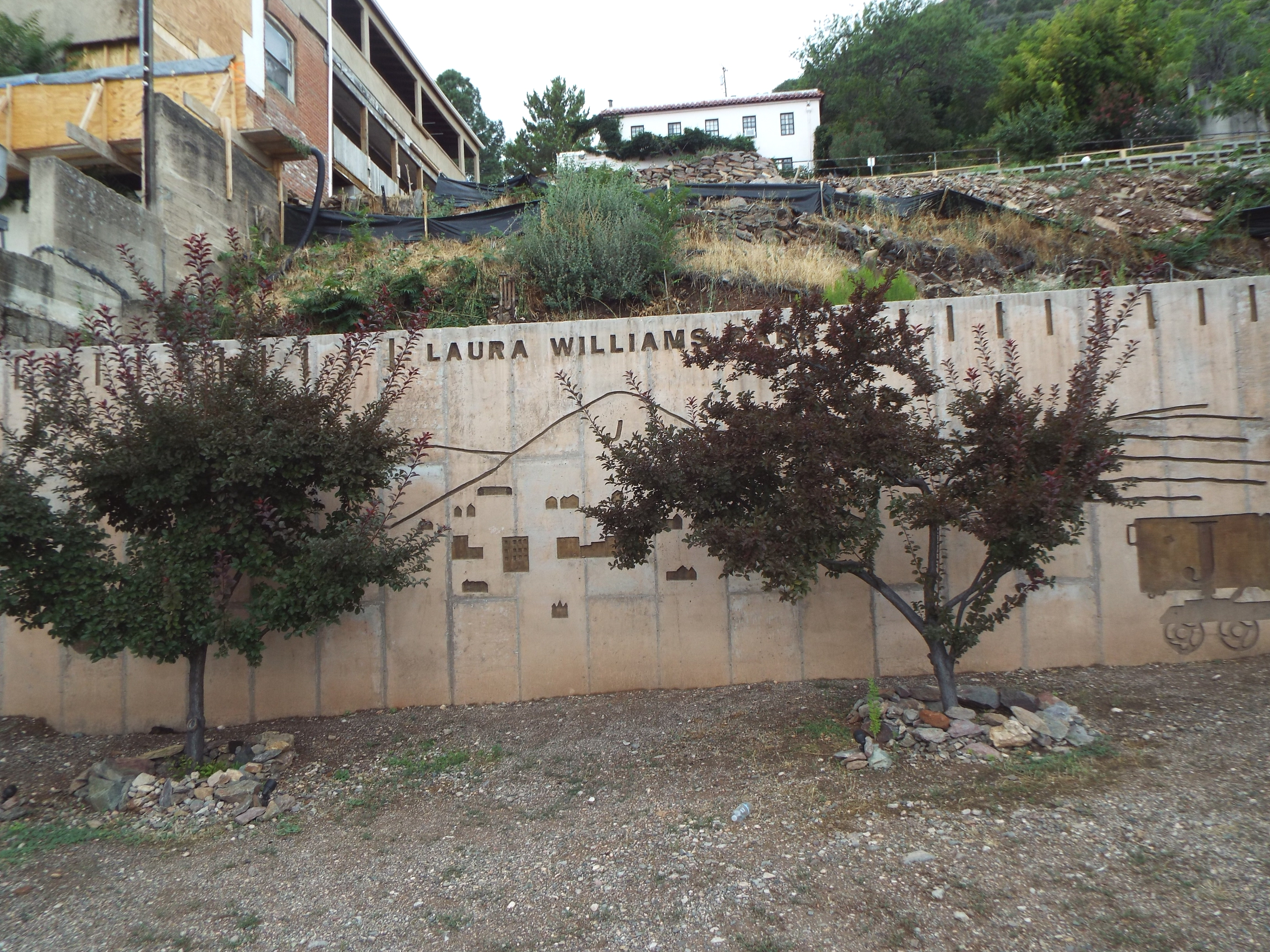
    Laura Williams Memorial Park in Jerome
  - Laura Williams Memorial Park
  - Mescal Gulch Cemetery
- Kirkland
  - Kirkland Cemetery, a.k.a. Kirkland Pioneer Cemetery
  - Owens Family Ranch Cemetery
  - Rynearson Family Cemetery
- Lapham, ghost town with unkempt graves nearby.
- Mayer (ghost town)
  - Mayer Cemetery
  - Todd Ranch Cemetery
- McCabe, ghost town near Humboldt (ghost town)
  - McCabe Cemetery, a.k.a. Miner's Union Cemetery and Spud Mountain Cemetery
- Middelton, former mining town for the De Soto Mine, situated along the Bradshaw Mountain Railroad, scattered cemetery graves remain
- Miller Valley (near Prescott)
  - Miller Valley Cemetery, a.k.a. Ritter Cemetery, Simmons Cemetery
- Minnehaha, scattered graves
  - Tussock Spring Cemetery/Gravesite
- Monte Cristo Mine Cemeteries (Upper and Lower), Constellation Road to Wickenburg
- Nelson
  - Nelson Cemetery, a.k.a. Nelson Memorial Cemetery
- Oak Creek
  - Cornville Cemetery
- Octave (ghost town) (near Weaver)
  - Moralez Ranch Family Cemetery
  - Octave Cemetery
  - Weaver Cemetery – ghost town
- Paulden
  - Colonel Jeff Cooper Burial Site
  - Puntenney Pioneer Cemetery, a.k.a. Cedar Glade
- Paxton Place, near Walnut Grove
  - Walnut Grove Cemetery – ghost town
- Peeples Valley
  - Genung Memorial Park Cemetery, a.k.a. Peeples Valley Pioneer Cemetery, Yarnell Pioneer Cemetery
- Perkinsville (ghost town)
  - Perkinsville Cemetery
- Poland Junction
  - Masse Ranch Cemetery (1946)
- Prescott has multiple cemeteries, including:
  - All Saints Anglican Church Columbarium
  - Allred Family Cemetery
  - American Lutheran Church Memorial Garden
  - Arizona Pioneers' Home Cemetery, a.k.a. Simmons Cemetery
  - Beatty Family Graveyard, Prescott
  - Boblett Cemetery
  - Camp Date Creek, a.k.a. Fort McPherson, Cemetery, military cemetery – while many interments were relocated visible gravesites remain.
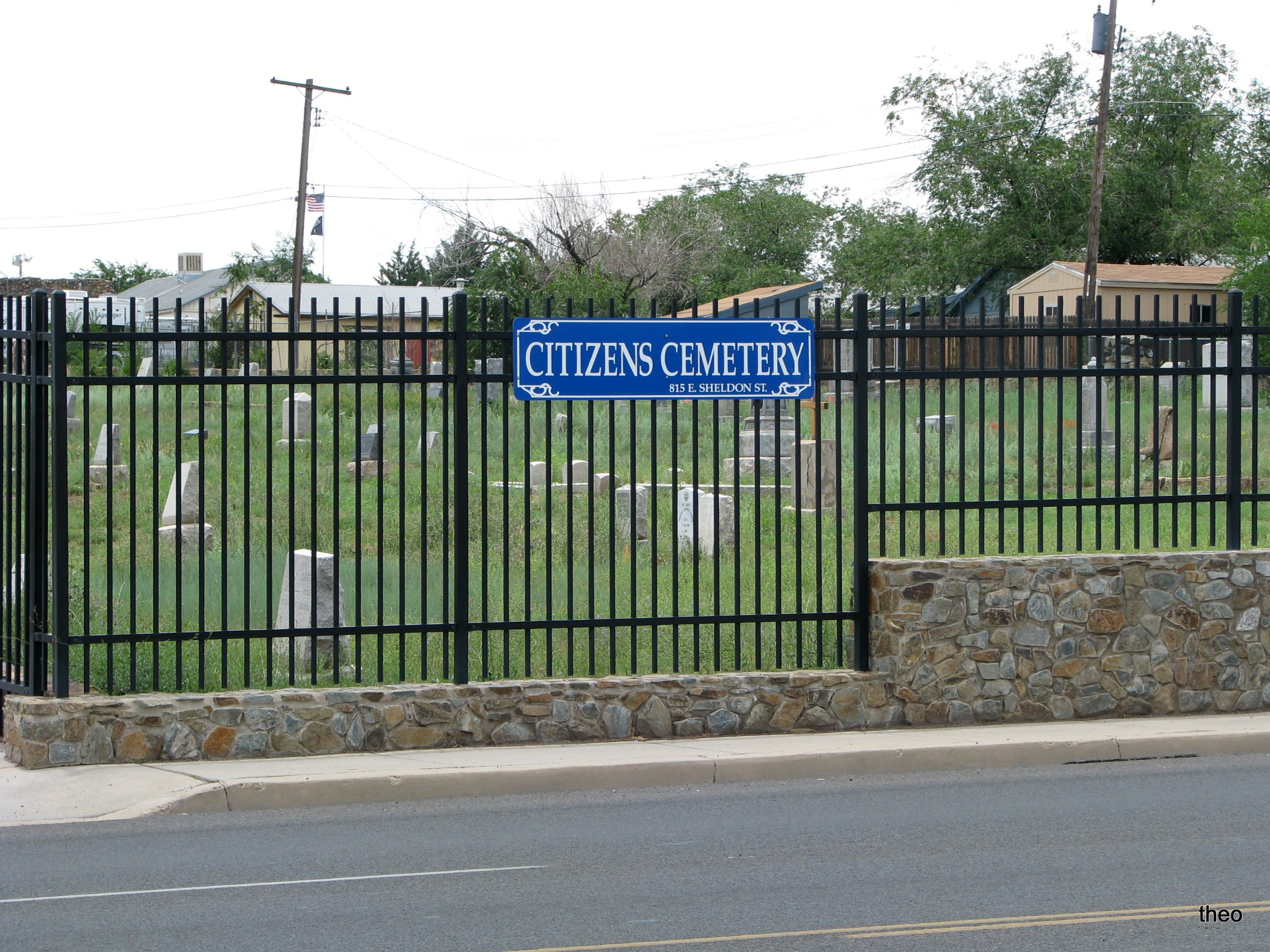
    Citizens Cemetery
  - Citizens Cemetery, Prescott Armory Historic District
  - Ferguson-Morrell Cemetery
  - First Lutheran Church Memorial Garden
  - I.O.O.F. Cemetery
  - Joseph Le Roy Hamblin Gravesite
  - Masonic Cemetery, a.k.a. Aztlan Lodge Masonic Cemetery
  - Memorial Park
  - Mountain View Cemetery
  - Prescott Cemetery, Prescott
  - Prescott National Cemetery a.k.a. Fort Whipple Cemetery
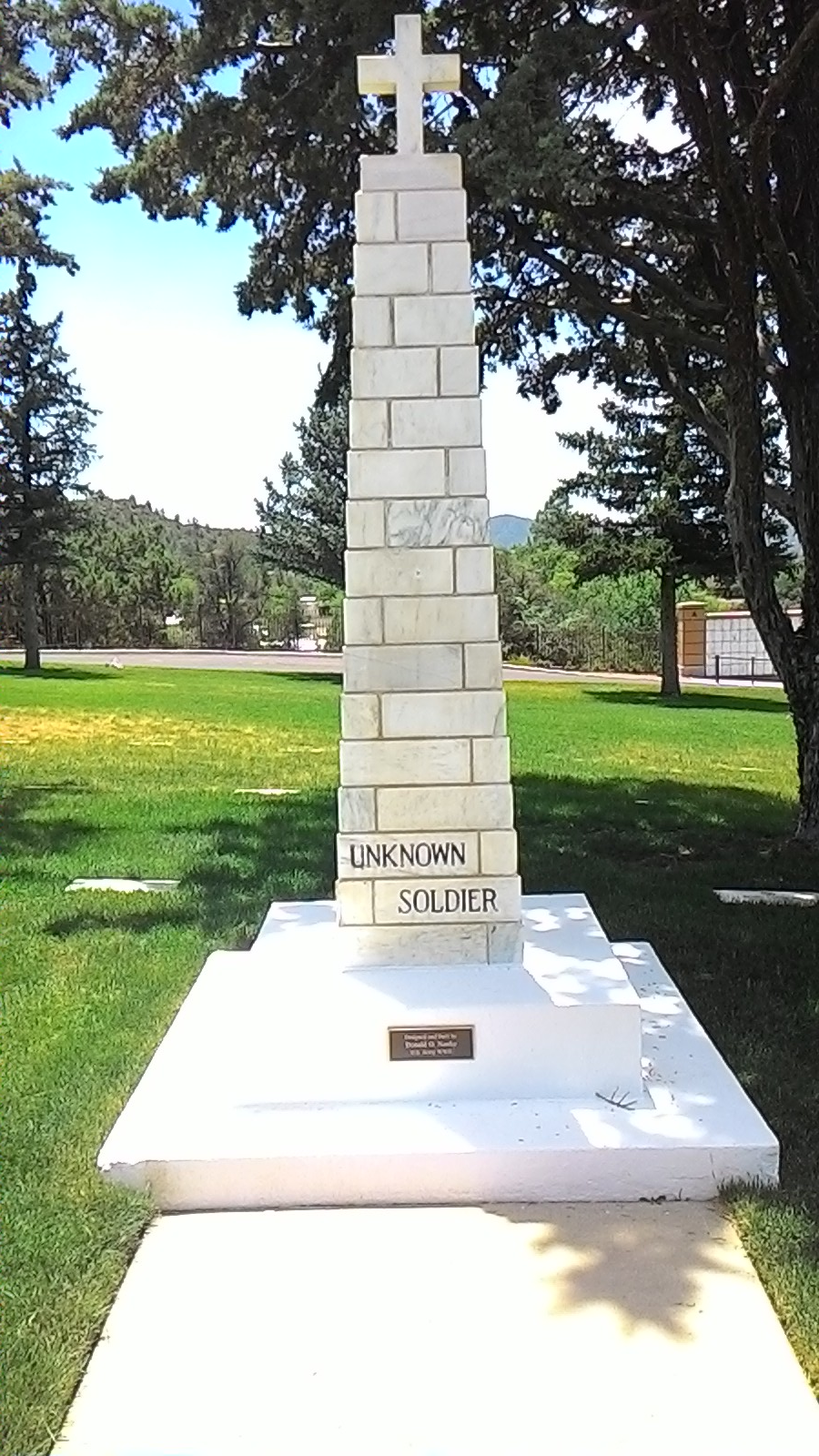
    Prescott National Cemetery Unknown Soldier Monument
  - Prescott United Methodist Church Columbarium
  - Rolling Hills Cemetery, Prescott, closed cemetery
  - Saint Lukes Columbarium
  - Sharlot Hall Museum Grounds
  - Shepherd of the Hills Lutheran Church Columbarium
  - Trinity Presbyterian Church Cemetery
  - Yavapai County Cemetery (Ainsworth Street), next to the Mountain View Cemetery of Prescott
  - Yavapain County Cemetery (Iron Springs Road)
  - Yavapai-Prescott Tribe
- Prescott Valley
  - Angeline Hoagland Gravesite
  - Prescott Valley Arizona Moose Memorial Grounds
- Rimrock
  - Casner Family Cemetery
- Sayers Spring, a.k.a. Sayers Station and Sayersville – near Gilbert – abandoned buildings and grave markers
- Sedona
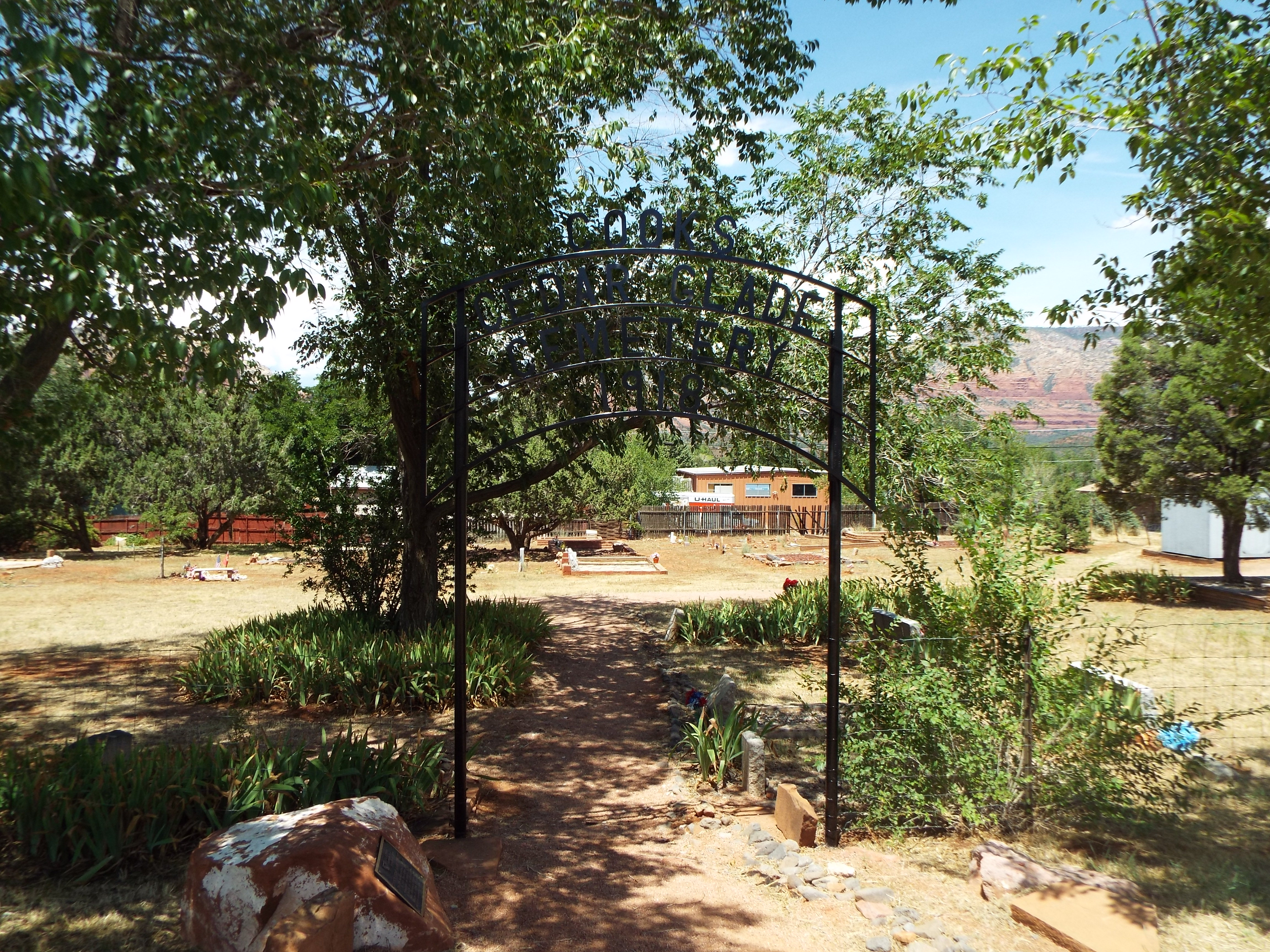
  Cooks Cedar Glade Cemetery entrance
  - Cooks Cedar Glade Cemetery (1918) (City of Sedona Landmark No. 12)
  - Saint Andrew's Episcopal Church Columbarium
  - Sedona Community Cemetery
  - Schuerman Red Rock Cemetery (1893)
- Seligman
  - Seligman Public Cemetery
- Shelley, abandoned buildings with nearby graves
- Signal (ghost town)
- Skull Valley
  - Christopherson Cemetery
  - Old Skull Valley Cemetery
  - Skull Valley Cemetery
- Stanton (ghost town)
  - Moralez Cemetery
  - Stanton Cemetery
- Sycamore Creek, contains scattered graves
- Tip Top (ghost town)
- Venezia (ghost town)
- Wagoner (ghost town)
  - Gravesite of Captain James Clark Hunt (died 1890)
- Walker
  - Bykerk Graves, nearby interred cremated remains
- Walnut Creek
  - Walnut Creek Cemetery
- White Hills
  - White Hills Pioneer Cemetery.
- White Picacho Mountain – graves
- Williamson Valley, Arizona
  - Las Vegas Ranch Cemetery, a.k.a. Granite Mountain Cemetery, Pierce Cemetery, Williamson Valley Cemetery
- No associated community or town (includes wilderness areas)
  - Arcosanti Cemetery
  - Aultman Cemetery
  - Beaver Creek Baptist Church Cemetery
  - Beck's Quiet Place Cemetery
  - Bradshaw Spring Gravesite
  - Camp Wood/Camp Hualpai Post Cemetery (dating from the Hualapai War
  - Champie Mill Cemetery, a.k.a. Allen's Mill Cemetery
  - Champie Ranch Cemetery, a.k.a. Castle Hot Springs Cemetery
  - Clarkdale Indian Cemetery
  - Deacon Family Cemetery
  - Fort Hualapai Cemetery
  - Goodwin Site
  - Gleed Cemetery
  - Gold Basin Cemetery, abandoned mining area north of Kingman
  - Gunung Cemetery
  - Guttry Gravesite Cemetery
  - Hassayampa River – Leonardo Cordova grave, plus others
  - Hillside Cemetery
  - Hualapai Cemetery (Shook, Scholey, Rodgers)
  - Isaac Bradshaw Gravesite (1885)
  - James Waters Burial Place
  - Mescal Gulch, near Mescal Spring, three graves remain
  - Myrtle Irene Thomas Gravesite
  - Nellis Burial Ground
  - Pantano Cemetery
  - Pica Cemetery
  - Red Rock/Schuerman Cemetery
  - Redwood–Heritage Cemetery
  - Seventysix Mine
  - Sixby Ranch Cemetery
  - Slim Jim Creek graves
  - Stoddard Gravesite
  - Thompson Valley Cemetery
  - Weaver Mine Cemetery
  - Walker Gravesite

== Yuma ==
- Dome
  - Dome Valley Cemetery and Gila City
- Laguna
  - Laguna Cemetery, Laguna Dam, northwest of Yuma
- Mohawk
  - Robert Carpenter Burial Site
- Roll
  - Butterfield Stage Station Burial Sitef
- Somerton
  - Cocopah Indian Reservation Cemeteries (East and West)
- Wellton
  - Wellton Memorial Cemetery
- Yuma
  - Christ Lutheran Church Columbarium
  - Desert Lawn Memorial Park, a.k.a. Yuma Cemetery
  - Faith Lutheran Church Columbarium
  - Gloria de Cristo Lutheran Church Columbarium
  - Saint John Neumann Catholic Church Columbarium
  - Saint Paul's Episcopal Church Columbarium
  - Sunset Vista Funeral Home & Cemetery
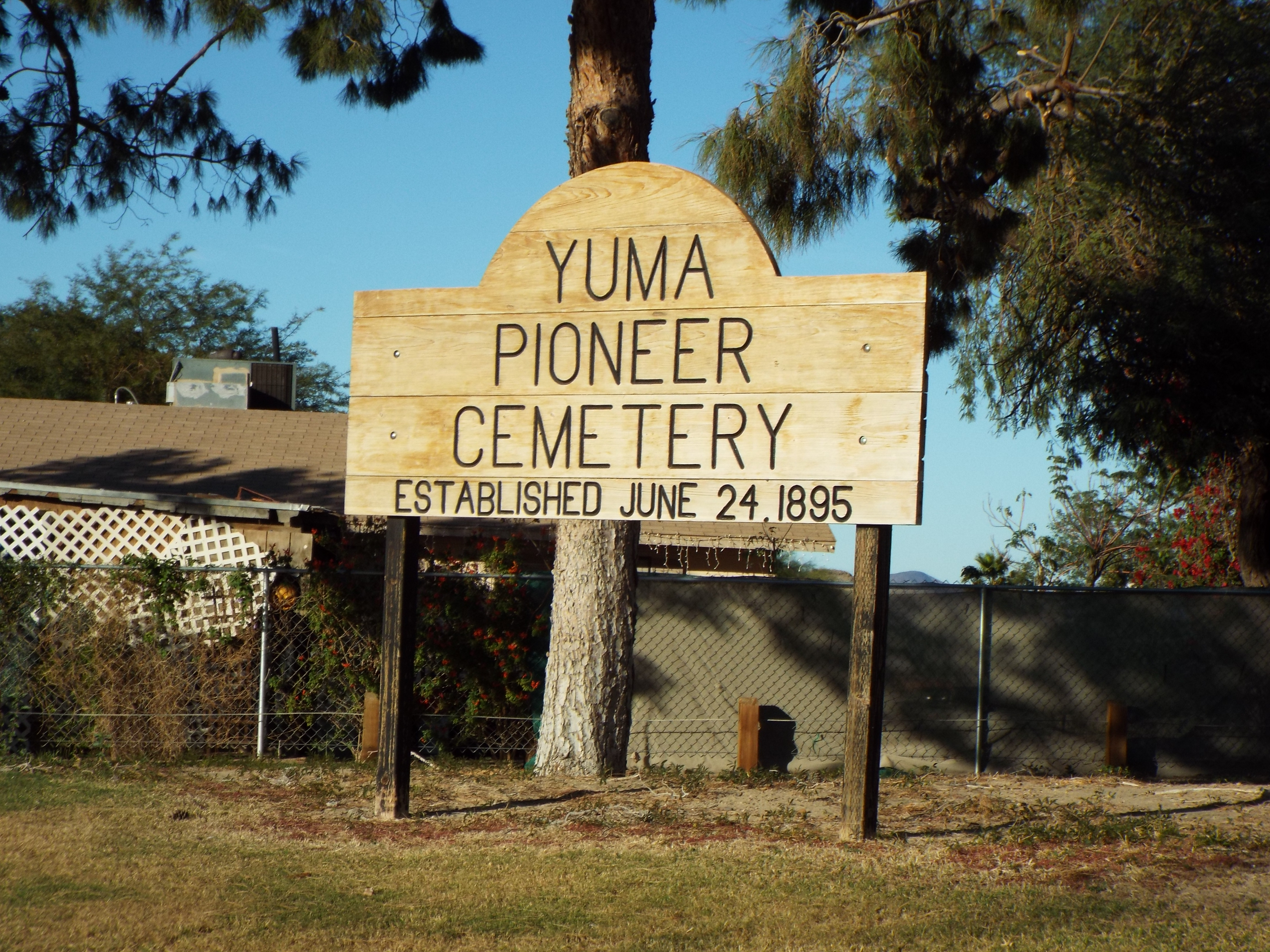
    Yuma's Pioneer Cemetery
  - Tribal Burial Ground
  - Trinity United Methodist Church Columbarium
  - Yuma Pioneer Cemetery, a.k.a. Old Yuma Cemetery & Yuma City Cemetery, which holds the grave of Arizona pioneer Jack Swilling
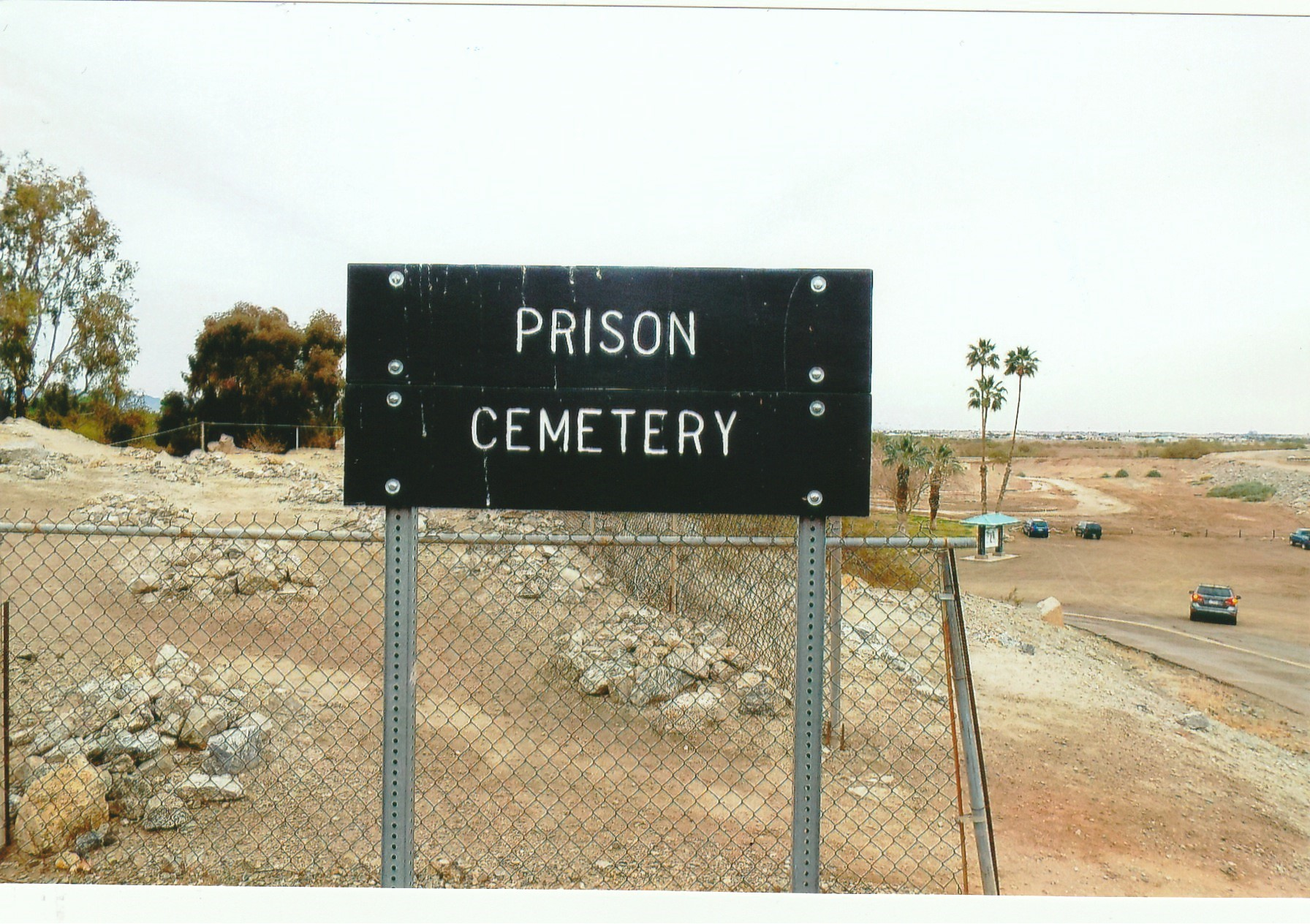
    Yuma Territorial Prison Cemetery
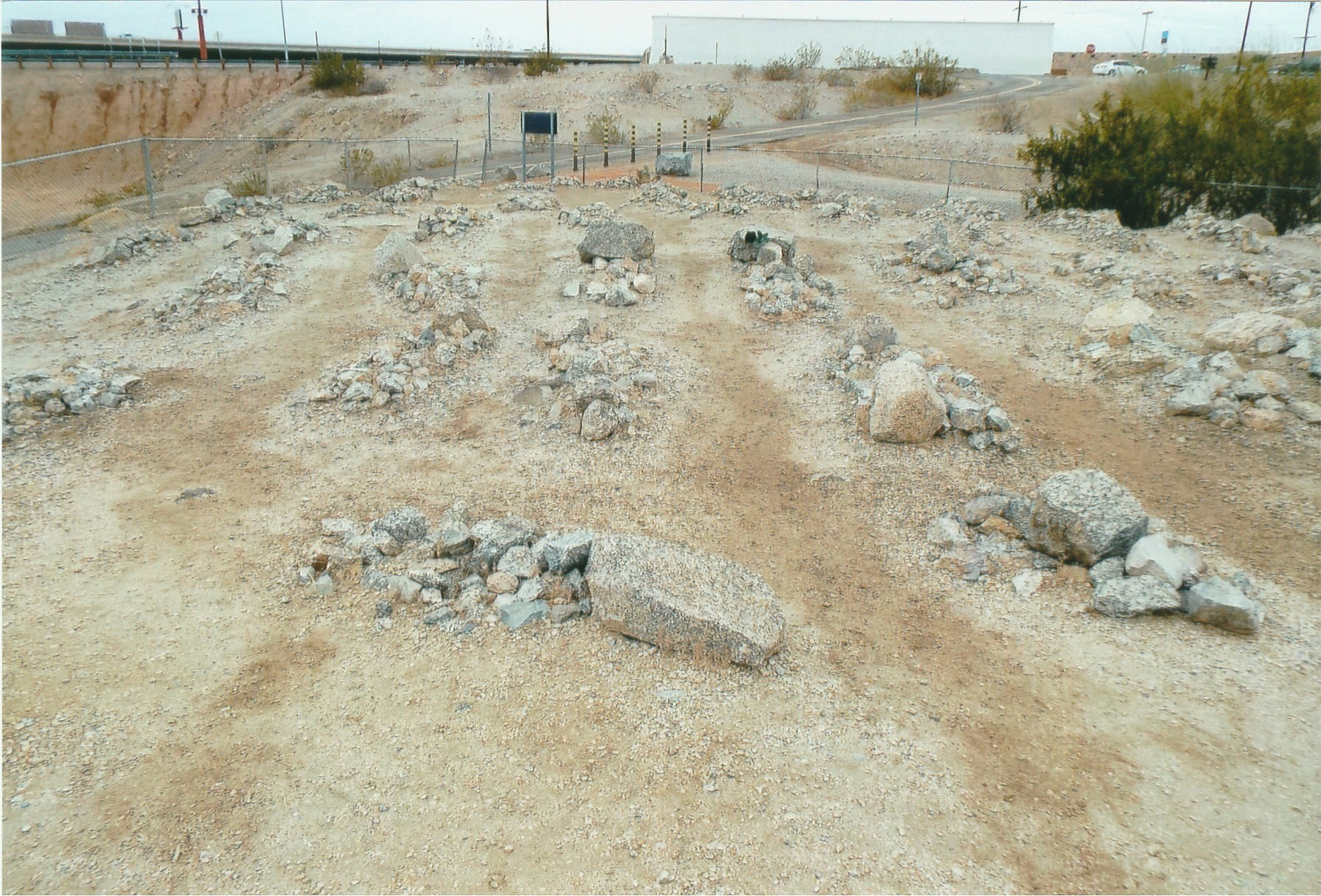
    Graves of prisoners
  - Yuma County Cemetery (includes re-interments from Immaculate Conception)
  - Yuma Territorial Prison
- No associated community or town (includes wilderness areas)
  - Agua Caliente Cemetery, near Camp Hyder
  - Bouse Cemetery
  - Camino Del Diablo Gravesites 1 and 2
  - Castle Dome Landing (site)
  - Cibola Cemetery
  - Colorado Mine & Cemetery, Castle Dome Mountains
  - Dave O'Neill Gravesite
  - Dome Cemetery, a.k.a. Gila City Cemetery
  - Fort Yuma Cemetery (graves removed to Presidio)
  - Hovatter Graves Site, Little Horn Mountains
  - Kofa and Polaris – KOFA Cemetery
  - Martinez Lake Road Cemetery
  - North Gila Valley Cemetery
  - Oglby Cemetery
  - Potholes Cemetery
  - Quartzsite Episcopal Cemetery

== See also ==
- Cochise County in the Old West
- List of cemeteries in the United States
- List of census-designated places in Arizona
- List of counties in Arizona
- List of ghost towns in Arizona
- List of Indian reservations in Arizona
