= Ali Ak Chin, Arizona =

Unincorporated community in the state of Arizona, United States

- Populated place
- Location of Ali Ak Chin in Arizona Ali Ak Chin, Arizona (the United States)
- Coordinates: 31°51′29″N 112°32′27″W
- Country: United States
- State: Arizona
- County: Pima
- Elevation: 1,801 ft (549 m)
- Time zone: UTC-7 (Mountain (MST))
  - Summer (DST): UTC-7 (MST)
- Area code: 520
- FIPS code: 04-01500
- GNIS feature ID: 24298

Ali Ak Chin is a populated place located in Pima County, Arizona, United States. It has an estimated elevation of 1,801 feet (549 m) above sea level.

== History ==
The traditional name of the village is Ak Chin, but to avoid confusion with the village of the same name on the Ak-Chin (Maricopa) Reservation, Ak-Chin, it was officially designated Ali Ak Chin in 1941. Ali Ak Chin means "little mouth of wash" in the O'odham language.

Ali Ak Chin's population was 40 in the 1960 U.S. census.
