= Forrest, Arizona =

- Populated place
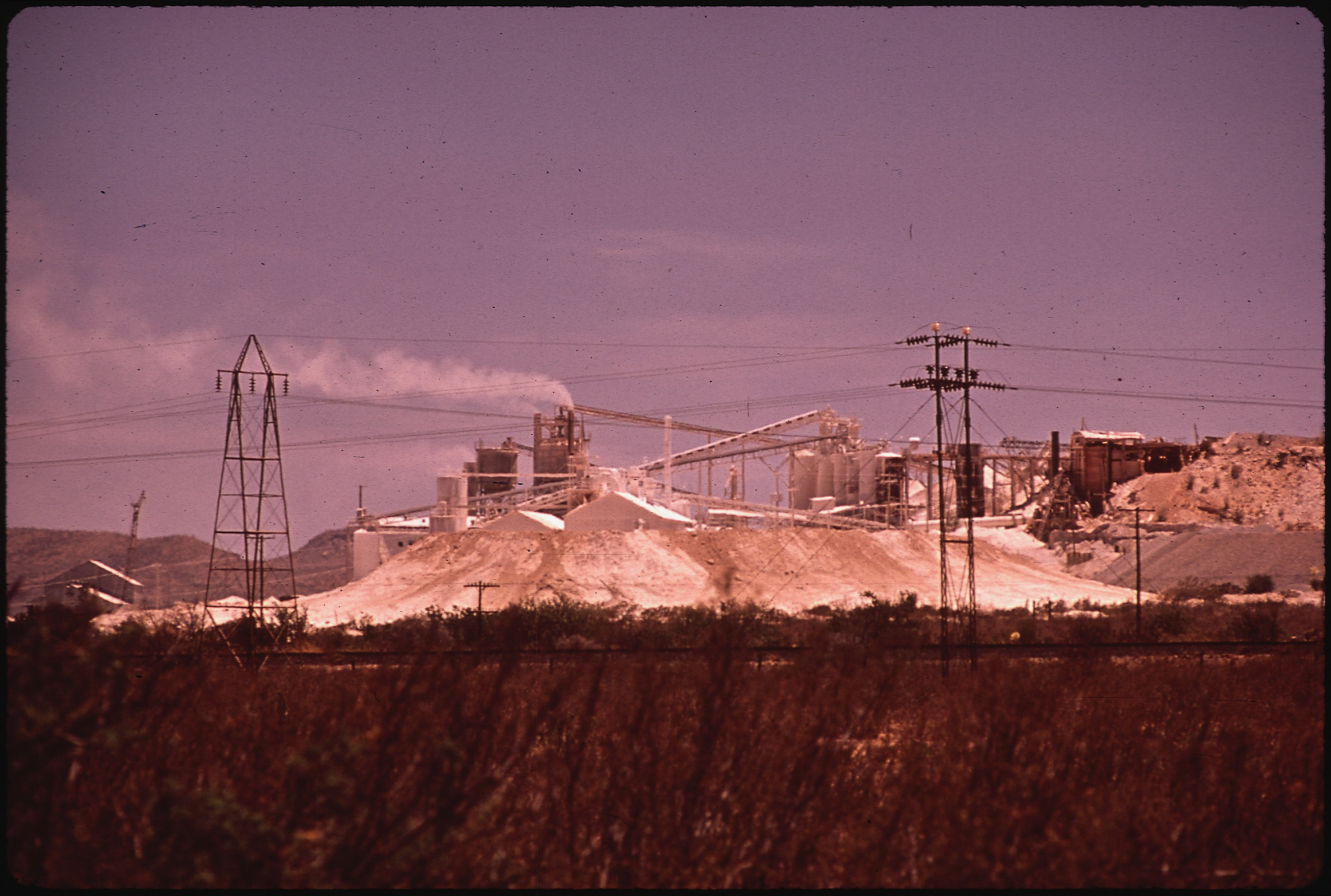
- Paul Lime Plant in 1972

- Location within the state of Arizona Forrest (the United States)
- Coordinates: 31°22′00″N 109°43′39″W
- Country: United States
- State: Arizona
- County: Cochise
- Elevation: 4,196 ft (1,279 m)
- Time zone: UTC-7 (Mountain (MST))
  - Summer (DST): UTC-7 (MST)
- Area code: 520
- FIPS code: 04-24180
- GNIS feature ID: 24420

Forrest was a populated place situated in Cochise County, Arizona, United States.

== History ==
Forrest was on the El Paso and Southwestern Railroad and was named for a local old resident and rancher.

The Paul Lime Plant began operating nearby in 1918 and the railway spur to there was renamed Paul's Spur. By the 1940s it was the largest lime producer in Southern Arizona.

Forrest had a post office that opened on May 8, 1914. Forrest School was twice destroyed by fire, once in 1915 and again in 1929 when it was replaced by a larger brick building. At one time up to 200 families lived nearby working in the lime plant. However following mechanisation the population dropped and the school closed in 1963. Forrest School District continued in existence organising transport to schools in Douglas.
