= Sil Nakya, Arizona =

- Populated place
- Location within the state of Arizona Sil Nakya (the United States)
- Coordinates: 32°13′18″N 111°48′59″W
- Country: United States
- State: Arizona
- County: Pima
- Elevation: 2,211 ft (674 m)
- Time zone: UTC-7 (Mountain (MST))
  - Summer (DST): UTC-7 (MST)
- Area code: 520
- FIPS code: 04-67030
- GNIS feature ID: 11303

Sil Nakya is a populated place situated in Pima County, Arizona, United States. Historically, it has also been known as Beebhak, San Lorenzo, San Lorenzo Well, Saranake, Seranake, Silinakik, and Silynarki. Sil Nakya became its official name as a result of a decision by the Board on Geographic Names in 1941. Sil nakya is O'odham for "saddle hangs". It has an estimated elevation of 2,211 feet (674 m) above sea level.
