= Minnehaha, Arizona =

- Populated place
- Location within the state of Arizona Minnehaha (the United States)
- Coordinates: 34°09′48″N 112°24′27″W
- Country: United States
- State: Arizona
- County: Yavapai
- Elevation: 5,469 ft (1,667 m)
- Time zone: UTC-7 (Mountain (MST))
- Area code: 928
- FIPS code: 04-46790
- GNIS feature ID: 31922

Minnehaha is a populated place situated in Yavapai County, Arizona, United States.
