= Peaceful Valley Memorial Park =

Cemetery in Arizona

Coordinates: 35°11′56″N 111°33′53″W

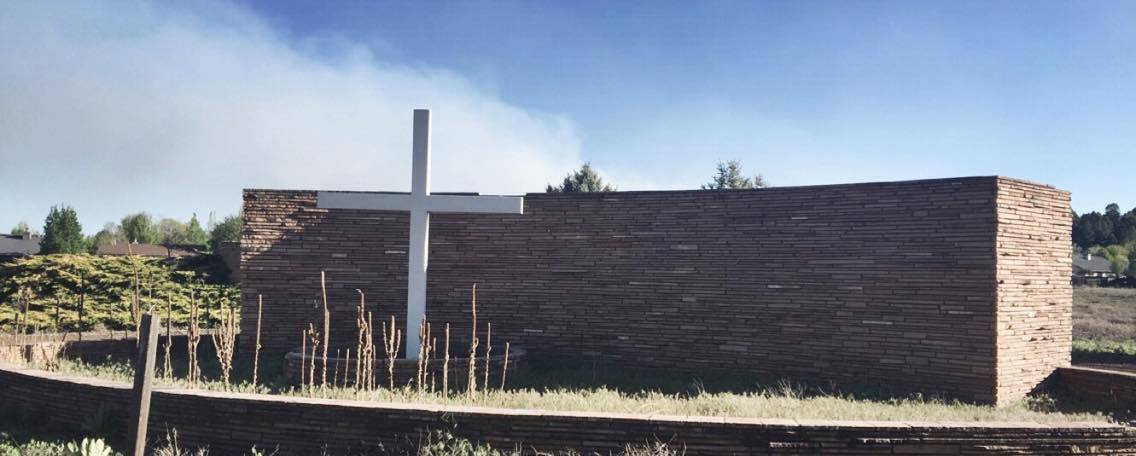

The Peaceful Valley Memorial Park is an abandoned cemetery located in Flagstaff, Arizona. Although the exact number of graves is unknown, it is estimated that about 140 bodies are buried there. There are also around 130 unfilled grave plots.

The first burials date back to 1960 and the most recent burial was that of Billy Derryberry (1925–2000), a corporal in the U.S. Marine Corps in World War II. It is also the final resting place of numerous other U.S. war veterans, including Doyle Sprague (1918–1982), a private first-class in the U.S. Army during World War II; William Sarellana Jr. (1948–1972), a corporal in the U.S. Marine Corps during the Vietnam War; Kenneth Newton (1940–1961), a private first-class in the U.S. Army; and Dale Bird (1935–1971), U.S. Air Force.

The cemetery, which lies between Old Walnut Canyon Road and a residential neighborhood, is now in a disarray due to a lack of upkeep by its multiple owners. The cemetery was left to more than a dozen heirs after the death of the original owner Kay Brockman. The owners have tried to sell the disheveled cemetery, but due to laws requiring privately owned for-profit cemeteries to keep a certain amount of money in a trust account for the upkeep and the fact that the plot is located in a flood plain, neither the City of Flagstaff nor any other organization has been willing to buy it.
