= Greaterville, Arizona =

Populated place in Pima County, Arizona

- Populated Place
- Location within the state of Arizona Greaterville (the United States)
- Coordinates: 31°45′50″N 110°45′00″W
- Country: United States
- State: Arizona
- County: Pima
- Elevation: 5,203 ft (1,586 m)
- Time zone: UTC-7 (Mountain (MST))
  - Summer (DST): UTC-7 (MST)
- Area code: 520
- FIPS code: 04-29570
- GNIS feature ID: 29567

Greaterville is a populated place situated in Pima County, Arizona, United States. It has an estimated elevation of 5,203 feet (1,586 m) above sea level.
