= Chico Shunie, Arizona =

- Populated place
- Location within the state of Arizona Chico Shunie, Arizona (the United States)
- Coordinates: 32°19′40″N 112°56′49″W
- Country: United States
- State: Arizona
- County: Pima
- Elevation: 1,752 ft (534 m)
- Time zone: UTC-7 (Mountain (MST))
  - Summer (DST): UTC-7 (MST)
- Area code: 520
- FIPS code: 04-12595
- GNIS feature ID: 24363

Chico Shunie is a populated place situated in Pima County, Arizona, United States. It has an estimated elevation of 1,752 feet (534 m) above sea level.
