= Gu Vo, Arizona =

Populated place in Pima County, Arizona

- Populated Place
- Location within the state of Arizona Gu Vo (the United States)
- Coordinates: 32°03′56″N 112°33′39″W
- Country: United States
- State: Arizona
- County: Pima
- Tribe: Tohono O'odham Nation
- Elevation: 2,146 ft (654 m)
- Time zone: UTC-7 (Mountain (MST))
  - Summer (DST): UTC-7 (MST)
- Area code: 520
- GNIS feature ID: 5412

Gu Vo, also known as Cubo, Kerwo, or Kuvo, is a populated place situated in Pima County, Arizona, United States. Gu Vo became the official name as a result of a Board on Geographic Names decision in 1941. It has an estimated elevation of 2,146 feet (654 m) above sea level.
