= Harqua, Arizona =

Former populated place in Maricopa County, Arizona

- Populated Place
- Location within the state of Arizona Harqua (the United States)
- Coordinates: 33°14′35″N 112°59′57″W
- Country: United States
- State: Arizona
- County: Maricopa
- Elevation: 1,086 ft (331 m)
- Time zone: UTC-7 (Mountain (MST))
  - Summer (DST): UTC-7 (MST)
- Area code: 928
- FIPS code: 04-31260
- GNIS feature ID: 24882

Not to be confused with the nearby Harquahala Mountains.

Harqua is a populated place situated in Maricopa County, Arizona, United States. It has an estimated elevation of 1,086 feet (331 m) above sea level.

Built along the Southern Pacific Railroad, the townsite of Harqua is approximately 18 miles south-southeast of Tonopah. Today it stands as a ghost town, (see: List of ghost towns in Arizona) with little more than a handful of crumbling foundations remaining.
