= Salt River, Arizona =

- Populated place
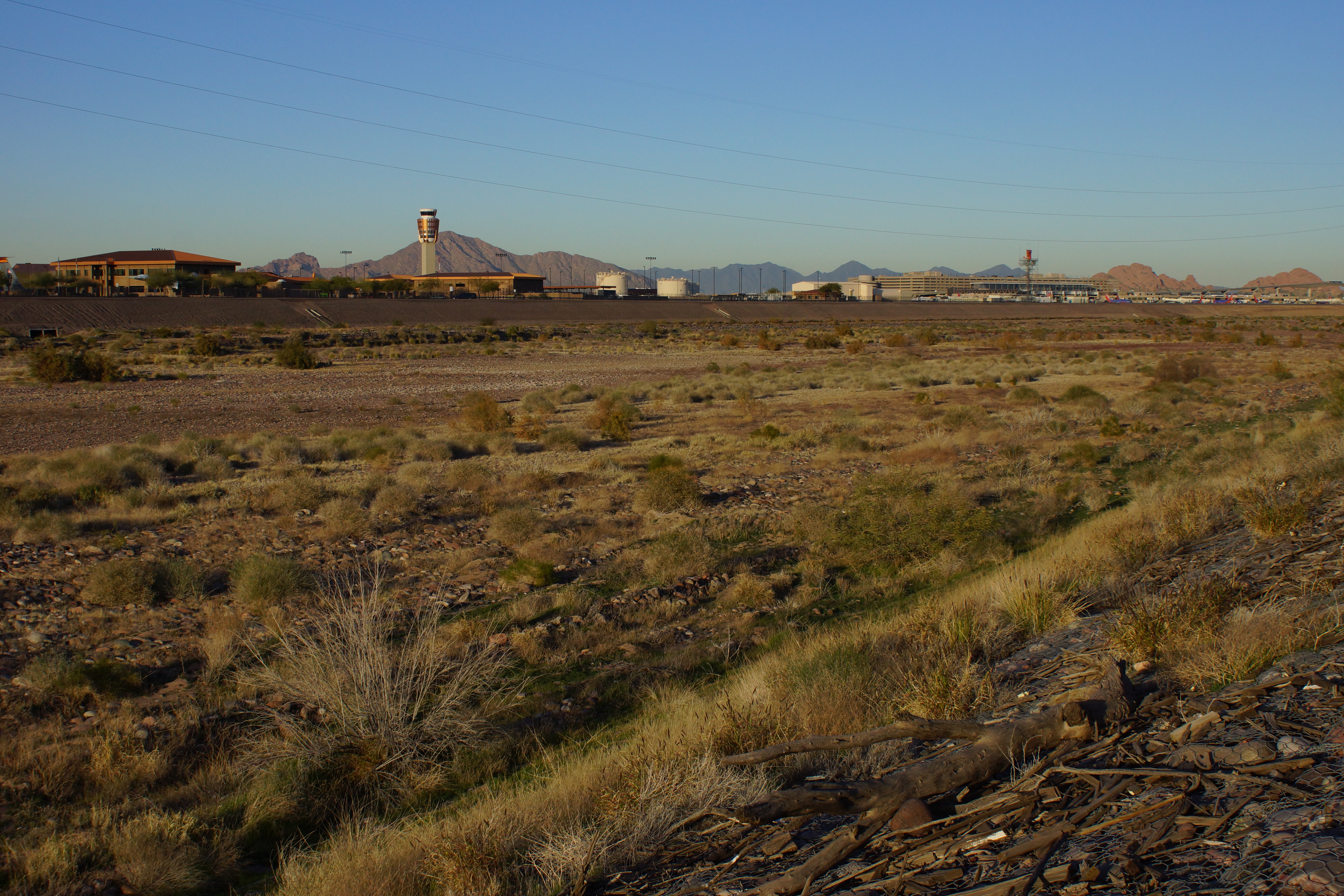
- Salt River, 2014

- Location within Arizona Location within the United States
- Coordinates: 33°28′00″N 111°51′51″W
- Country: United States
- State: Arizona
- County: Maricopa
- Elevation: 1,220 ft (372 m)
- Time zone: UTC-7 (Mountain (MST))
  - Summer (DST): UTC-7 (MST)
- Area code: 480
- GNIS feature ID: 44982

Salt River is a populated place situated in Maricopa County, Arizona, United States. It has an estimated elevation of 1,220 feet (370 m) above sea level. It is located on the Salt River Pima–Maricopa Indian Community.

Salt River is named after the Salt River on the north bank of which it is situated, east of Phoenix and near Lehi. The post office opened in 1912 and was originally named Saltriver, but was changed to the two-word version when the post office moved to Scottsdale in 1916.
