= El Tule, Arizona =

- Populated place
- Location within the state of Arizona El Tule (the United States)
- Coordinates: 34°22′47″N 109°23′50″W
- Country: United States
- State: Arizona
- County: Apache
- Elevation: 5,928 ft (1,807 m)
- Time zone: UTC-7 (Mountain (MST))
  - Summer (DST): UTC-7 (MST)
- Area code: 928
- GNIS feature ID: 24403

El Tule, also known as Craig, is a populated place situated in Apache County, Arizona, United States. It has an estimated elevation of 5,928 feet (1,807 m) above sea level.
