= Venezia, Arizona =

Former populated place in Yavapai County, Arizona

- Populated place
- Location within the state of Arizona Venezia (the United States)
- Coordinates: 34°23′35″N 112°25′01″W
- Country: United States
- State: Arizona
- County: Yavapai
- Elevation: 6,240 ft (1,902 m)
- Time zone: UTC-7 (Mountain (MST))
  - Summer (DST): UTC-7 (MST)
- Area code: 928
- FIPS code: 04-79555
- GNIS feature ID: 35758

Venezia is a ghost town situated in Yavapai County, Arizona, United States. It has an estimated elevation of 6,240 feet (1,900 m) above sea level.
