= Hardrock, Arizona =

Navajo Nation chapter in Navajo County, Arizona

- Populated Place
- Location within the state of Arizona Hardrock (the United States)
- Coordinates: 36°04′42″N 110°26′20″W
- Country: United States
- State: Arizona
- County: Navajo
- Elevation: 5,968 ft (1,819 m)

Population (2010)
  - Total: 1,161
- Time zone: UTC-7 (Mountain (MST))
  - Summer (DST): UTC-7 (MST)
- Area code: 928
- FIPS code: 04-31200
- GNIS feature ID: 2418957

Hardrock or Hard Rock is a chapter of the Navajo Nation situated in Navajo County, Arizona. It has an estimated elevation of 5,942 feet (1,811 m) above sea level. Its population as of the 2010 census is 1,161 living in an area of 78,100 acres.
