= Old Glory, Arizona =

Community in Santa Cruz County, Arizona, US

Coordinates: 31°26′03″N 111°15′13″W

Old Glory is a ghost town in Santa Cruz County, Arizona, in the United States.
