= Troy, Arizona =

- Populated place
- Location within the state of Arizona Troy (the United States)
- Coordinates: 33°08′37″N 110°53′57″W
- Country: United States
- State: Arizona
- County: Pinal
- Elevation: 3,638 ft (1,109 m)
- Time zone: UTC-7 (Mountain (MST))
  - Summer (DST): UTC-7 (MST)
- Area code: 520
- FIPS code: 04-75570
- GNIS feature ID: 25341

Troy, also historically known as either Skinner Village or Skinnerville, is a populated place situated in Pinal County, Arizona, United States. Its name became official by a decision by the Board on Geographic Names in 1965. It has an estimated elevation of 3,638 feet (1,109 m) above sea level.
