= Dugas, Arizona =

- Populated place
- Location within the state of Arizona Dugas (the United States)
- Coordinates: 34°21′43″N 111°58′43″W
- Country: United States
- State: Arizona
- County: Yavapai
- Elevation: 3,937 ft (1,200 m)
- Time zone: UTC-7 (Mountain (MST))
  - Summer (DST): UTC-7 (MST)
- Area code: 928
- FIPS code: 04-20715
- GNIS feature ID: 28668

Dugas is a populated place situated in Yavapai County, Arizona, United States.
