= Sanchez, Arizona =

- Populated place
- Location within the state of Arizona Sanchez (the United States)
- Coordinates: 32°52′10″N 109°32′34″W
- Country: United States
- State: Arizona
- County: Graham
- Elevation: 3,061 ft (933 m)
- Time zone: UTC-7 (Mountain (MST))
  - Summer (DST): UTC-7 (MST)
- Area code: 928
- FIPS code: 04-63000
- GNIS feature ID: 10866

Sanchez is a populated place situated in Graham County, Arizona, United States. It has an estimated elevation of 3,061 feet (933 m) above sea level.
