= Mount Trumbull, Arizona =

Populated place in Mohave County, Arizona

- Populated place
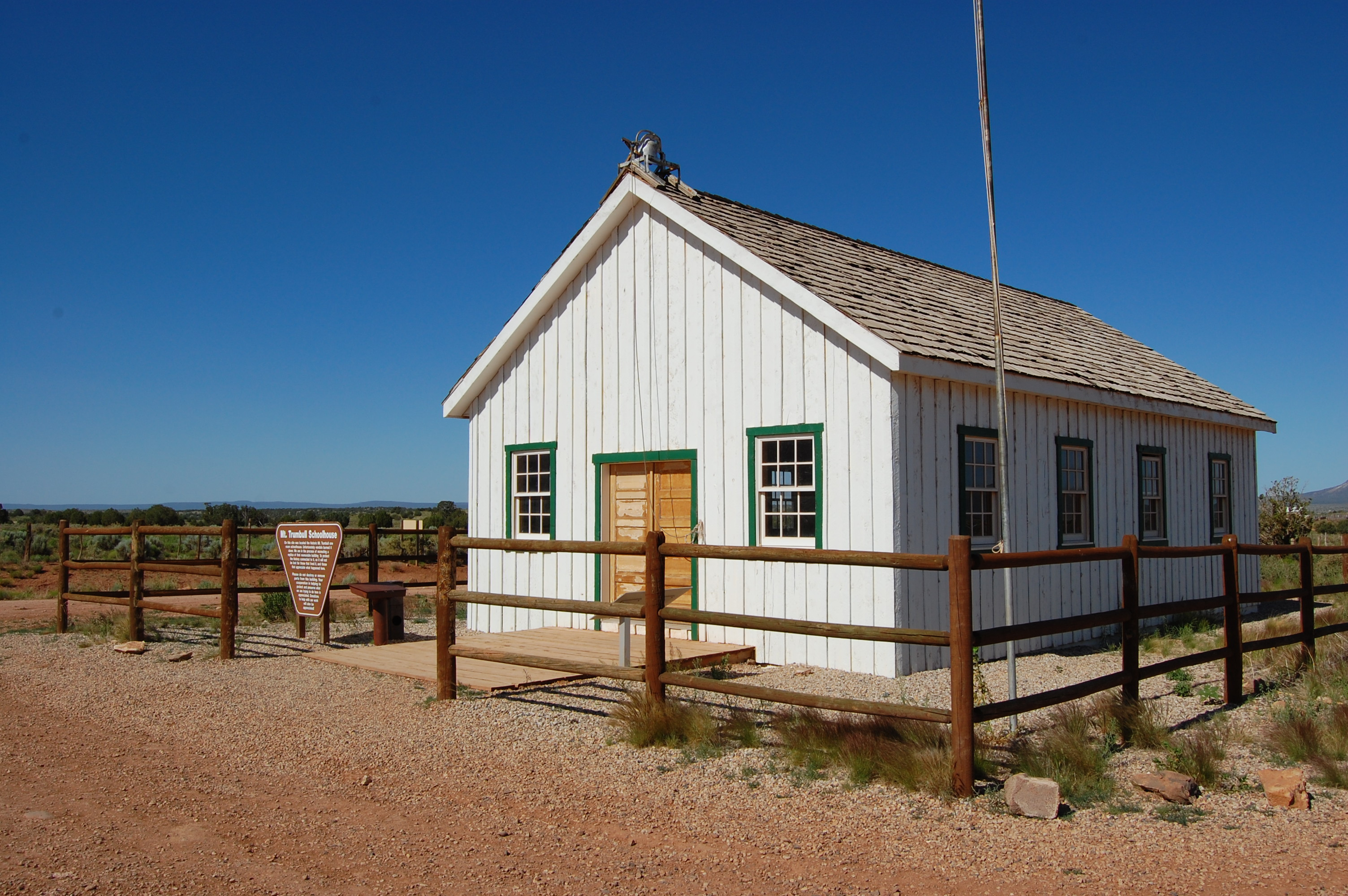
- Mt. Trumbull School

- Location within the state of Arizona Mount Trumbull (the United States)
- Coordinates: 36°24′43″N 113°19′32″W
- Country: United States
- State: Arizona
- County: Mohave
- Elevation: 5,331 ft (1,625 m)
- Time zone: UTC-7 (Mountain (MST))
  - Summer (DST): UTC-7 (MST)
- Area code: 928
- FIPS code: 04-48100
- GNIS feature ID: 12738

Mount Trumbull is a populated place situated in Mohave County, Arizona, United States. It has also been known as Bundyville. It has an estimated elevation of 5,331 feet (1,625 m) above sea level.

== History ==
The town contained the Mount Trumbull School, a historic schoolhouse constructed in 1922. It served as a school, church, meeting room and dance hall for the surrounding area until its closure in 1966. After the original structure was destroyed by arson, an exact replica was rebuilt in 2001 and is currently open to the public as an educational exhibit.

Mount Trumbull's population was 111 in 1940.
