= Kansas Settlement, Arizona =

Populated place in Cochise County, Arizona

- Populated place
- Location within the state of Arizona Kansas Settlement (the United States)
- Coordinates: 32°03′54″N 109°45′46″W
- Country: United States
- State: Arizona
- County: Cochise
- Elevation: 4,216 ft (1,285 m)
- Time zone: UTC-7 (Mountain (MST))
  - Summer (DST): UTC-7 (MST)
- Area code: 520
- FIPS code: 04-36850
- GNIS feature ID: 24476

Kansas Settlement is a populated place located in Sulphur Springs Valley in Cochise County, Arizona, United States.

== History ==
After World War II, farming around Kansas Settlement expanded greatly, due to opening markets and better irrigation techniques. However, by 1985 less than 25% of the area's irrigated farmland was still in production. The largest reason for this was the dropping levels of aquifers, which significantly increased the cost of pumping water for irrigation. In one year alone, 1963, water levels in Kansas Settlement dropped by fifty feet. One of the crops grown in and around Kansas Settlement are orchards of Western Schley pecans. Between May 2005 and December 2008, a large study was done in Kansas Settlement on the effects of nitrogen fertilization on the Western Schley pecan.
