= Humbug, Arizona =

Populated place in Yavapai County, Arizona

- Populated place
- Location within the state of Arizona Humbug (the United States)
- Coordinates: 34°03′17″N 112°19′24″W
- Country: United States
- State: Arizona
- County: Yavapai
- Elevation: 2,461 ft (750 m)
- Time zone: UTC-7 (Mountain (MST))
- Area code: 928
- FIPS code: 04-34645
- GNIS feature ID: 24467

Humbug, also known as Humburg, is a populated place situated in Yavapai County, Arizona, United States. The community was named after Humbug Creek.
