= Sikul Himatk, Arizona =

- Populated place
- Location within the state of Arizona Sikul Himatk (the United States)
- Coordinates: 32°06′54″N 112°02′08″W
- Country: United States
- State: Arizona
- County: Pima
- Elevation: 2,156 ft (657 m)
- Time zone: UTC-7 (Mountain (MST))
  - Summer (DST): UTC-7 (MST)
- Area code: 520
- FIPS code: 04-66940
- GNIS feature ID: 11300

Sikul Himatk is a populated place situated in Pima County, Arizona, United States.

From 1893 to 1912, the location was known as Vaheja. Historically, it has also been called Siclehema, Sikulhamakt, Sikulhamatk, and Sikulhimat. In 1941, the Board on Geographic Names changed the official name to Sikul Himatk, which is O'odham meaning "water going around", due to it being situated between two watersheds. It has an estimated elevation of 2,155 feet (657 m) above sea level.
