= Salado, Arizona =

- Populated place
- Location within the state of Arizona Salado (the United States)
- Coordinates: 34°26′01″N 109°24′38″W
- Country: United States
- State: Arizona
- County: Apache
- Elevation: 5,863 ft (1,787 m)
- Time zone: UTC-7 (Mountain (MST))
  - Summer (DST): UTC-7 (MST)
- Area code: 928
- FIPS code: 04-62490
- GNIS feature ID: 10730

Salado, also known as Salido, is a populated place situated in Apache County, Arizona, United States. It has an estimated elevation of 5,863 feet (1,787 m) above sea level.
