= Lapham, Arizona =

Populated place in Yavapai County

- Populated place
- Location within the state of Arizona Lapham (the United States)
- Coordinates: 34°10′50″N 112°24′08″W
- Country: United States
- State: Arizona
- County: Yavapai
- Elevation: 5,253 ft (1,601 m)
- Time zone: UTC-7 (Mountain (MST))
- Area code: 928
- FIPS code: 04-40175
- GNIS feature ID: 38562

Lapham is a populated place situated in Yavapai County, Arizona, United States.
