= Chiuli Shaik, Arizona =

- Populated place
- Location within the state of Arizona Chiuli Shaik, Arizona (the United States)
- Coordinates: 31°49′43″N 111°38′48″W
- Country: United States
- State: Arizona
- County: Pima
- Elevation: 3,228 ft (984 m)
- Time zone: UTC-7 (Mountain (MST))
  - Summer (DST): UTC-7 (MST)
- Area code: 520
- FIPS code: 04-12895
- GNIS feature ID: 24365

Chiuli Shaik is a populated place situated in Pima County, Arizona, United States. Chiuli Shaik became its official name through a decision of the U.S. Geological Survey's Board on Geographic Names in 1941. It is also known by several unofficial names, including Fresnal, Kohi Kug, Koxikux, Resnal, and Tshiuliseik. It has an estimated elevation of 3,228 feet (984 m) above sea level.
