= Choulic, Arizona =

- Populated place
- Location within the state of Arizona Choulic, Arizona (the United States)
- Coordinates: 31°40′02″N 111°46′36″W
- Country: United States
- State: Arizona
- County: Pima
- Elevation: 2,490 ft (760 m)
- Time zone: UTC-7 (Mountain (MST))
  - Summer (DST): UTC-7 (MST)
- Area code: 520
- FIPS code: 04-12980
- GNIS feature ID: 24367

Choulic is a populated place situated in Pima County, Arizona, United States. The name means "corner" in the O'odham language. It has an estimated elevation of 2,480 feet (760 m) above sea level.
