= Constellation, Arizona =

- former populated place
- Location within the state of Arizona Constellation (the United States)
- Coordinates: 34°03′49″N 112°33′57″W
- Country: United States
- State: Arizona
- County: Yavapai
- Elevation: 4,360 ft (1,330 m)
- Time zone: UTC-7 (Mountain (MST))
  - Summer (DST): UTC-7 (MST)
- Area code: 928
- GNIS feature ID: 42812

Constellation is a former mining town in Yavapai County, Arizona, United States. It has an estimated elevation of 3,560 feet (1,090 m) above sea level. The town was started to support the Monte Cristo Mine, which was later joined by several other mines. In 1925, the town had a post office and some 250 residents. No trace of it is left, though ruins of the various mines surround the ghost town site.
