= Arizona's 7th congressional district =

U.S. House district for Arizona

Coordinates: 33°25′40″N 112°07′08″W

- Interactive map of district boundaries since January 3, 2023
- Representative: Adelita Grijalva; D–Tucson
- Area: 15,405 mi^{2} (39,900 km^{2})
- Distribution: 83.6% urban; 16.4% rural
- Population (2025): 834,726
- Median household income: $61,940
- Ethnicity: 59.8% Hispanic; 28.5% White; 3.9% Black; 3.0% Native American; 2.5% Two or more races; 1.9% Asian; 0.6% other
- Cook PVI: D+13

Arizona's 7th congressional district is a congressional district located in the U.S. state of Arizona. The district stretches along the Mexico–United States border and includes the western third of Tucson, parts of Yuma and Nogales, as well as Avondale and Tolleson in Metro Phoenix. It has been represented by Democrat Adelita Grijalva since November 2025.

== History ==
=== 2003–2013 ===
Arizona picked up a seventh district after the 2000 census. Situated in the southwestern part of the state, it included all of Yuma County and parts of La Paz, Maricopa, Pima, Pinal, and Santa Cruz counties. For all intents and purposes, it was the successor to what had been the 2nd district—the former seat of longtime congressman Mo Udall–from 1951 to 2003.

The district was larger than Rhode Island, Delaware, Hawaii, Connecticut and New Jersey combined. It included 300 miles of the U.S. border with Mexico. It was home to seven sovereign Native American nations: the Ak-Chin Indian Community, Cocopah, Colorado River Indian Tribes, Gila River Indian Community, Pascua Yaqui Tribe, Quechan, and Tohono O'odham.

=== 2013–2023 ===
After the 2010 census, the old 7th district essentially became the 3rd district, while the 7th was redrawn to take in most of the old 4th district.

=== 2023–present ===
Arizona's 7th district was redrawn to include much of the 3rd district, under a configuration similar to its 2003–13 incarnation. It covers parts of Pima, Yuma, La Paz, Cochise, and Maricopa counties.

== Composition ==
For the 118th and successive Congresses (based on redistricting following the 2020 census), the district contains all or portions of the following counties and communities.

Cochise County (6)
Bisbee, Douglas (part; also 6th), Miracle Valley, Naco, Palominas, Pirtleville

Maricopa County (6)
Avondale, Gila Bend, Goodyear (part; also 9th), Kaka, Theba, Tolleson

Pima County (38)
Ajo, Ak Chin, Ali Chunk, Ali Chukson, Ali Molina, Anegam, Arivaca, Arivaca Junction, Avra Valley, Charco, Chiawuli Tak, Comobabi, Cowlic, Drexel Heights, Flowing Wells, Gu Oidak, Haivana Nakya, Ko Vaya, Maish Vaya, Nolic, Picture Rocks, Pisinemo, Sahuarita (part; also 6th), Santa Rosa, San Miguel, Sells, South Komelik, South Tucson, Summit, Three Points, Topawa, Tucson (part; also 6th), Tucson Estates, Tucson Mountains (part; also 6th), Valencia West, Ventana, Wahak Hotrontk, Why

Pinal County (4)
Chuichu, Kohatk, Tat Momoli, Vaiva Vo

Santa Cruz County (10)
All 10 communities

Yuma County (11)
Avenue B and C, Donovan Estates, Drysdale, Gadsden, Orange Grove Mobile Manor, San Luis, Rancho Mesa Verde, Somerton, Wall Lane, Wellton (part; also 9th), Yuma (part; also 9th)

== Recent election results from statewide races ==
Year	Office	Results
2004	President	Kerry 56.6% - 42.8%
2008	President	Obama 57.2% - 41.7%
2010	Senate	Glassman 49.0% - 45.0%
2010	Governor	Goddard 56.2% - 40.8%
2010	Secretary of State	Deschene 57.6% - 42.4%
2010	Attorney General	Rotellini 59.6% - 40.4%
2010	Treasurer	Cherny 55.9% - 37.5%
2013–2023 Boundaries
2008	President	Obama 64.7% - 34.1%
2010	Senate	Glassman 56.8% - 37.4%
2010	Governor	Goddard 66.8% - 30.0%
2012	President	Obama 71.7% - 26.5%
2012	Senate	Carmona 71.9% - 23.1%
2014	Governor	DuVal 65.2% - 29.3%
2016	President	Clinton 71.8% - 22.6%
2016	Senate	Kirkpatrick 62.3% - 32.2%
2018	Senate	Sinema 75.4% - 21.2%
2018	Governor	Garcia 67.4% - 29.7%
2018	Attorney General	Contreras 74.1% - 25.7%
2020	President	Biden 73.7% - 24.7%
2020	Senate (Spec.)	Kelly 76.0% - 24.0%
2023–2033 Boundaries
2016	President	Clinton 63% - 30%
2016	Senate	Kirkpatrick 57% - 38%
2018	Senate	Sinema 66% - 31%
2018	Governor	Garcia 60% - 37%
2018	Attorney General	Contreras 68% - 32%
2020	President	Biden 66% - 33%
2020	Senate (Spec.)	Kelly 68% - 32%
2022	Senate	Kelly 68% - 30%
2022	Governor	Hobbs 66% - 33%
2022	Secretary of State	Fontes 68% - 32%
2022	Attorney General	Mayes 66% - 34%
2022	Treasurer	Quezada 63% - 37%
2024	President	Harris 60% - 38%
2024	Senate	Gallego 63% - 33%

== List of members representing the district ==
Arizona began sending a seventh member to the House after the 2000 census.

Representative	Party	Years	Cong ress(es)	Electoral history	Geography and Counties
District created January 3, 2003
Raúl Grijalva (Tucson)	Democratic	January 3, 2003 – January 3, 2013	108th 109th 110th 111th 112th	Elected in 2002. Re-elected in 2004. Re-elected in 2006. Re-elected in 2008. Re-elected in 2010. Redistricted to the 3rd district.	2003–2013: SW Arizona, including parts of Tucson: Yuma, La Paz (part), Maricopa (part), Pima (part), Pinal (part), Santa Cruz (part)
Ed Pastor (Phoenix)	Democratic	January 3, 2013 – January 3, 2015	113th	Redistricted from 4th district. Re-elected in 2012. Retired.	2013–2023: Much of inner Phoenix with the eastern portion of Glendale
Ruben Gallego (Phoenix)	Democratic	January 3, 2015 – January 3, 2023	114th 115th 116th 117th	Elected in 2014. Re-elected in 2016. Re-elected in 2018. Re-elected in 2020. Redistricted to the 3rd district.	2013–2023: Much of inner Phoenix with the eastern portion of Glendale
Raúl Grijalva (Tucson)	Democratic	January 3, 2023 – March 13, 2025	118th 119th	Redistricted from the 3rd district and re-elected in 2022. Re-elected in 2024. Announced retirement, then died.	2023–present:
Vacant		March 13, 2025 – November 12, 2025	119th		2023–present:
Adelita Grijalva (Tucson)	Democratic	November 12, 2025 – present	119th	Elected to finish her father’s term. Re-elected in 2026.	2023–present:

== Election results ==
The district was created in 2002 following results from the 2000 U.S. census.

=== 2002–2012 ===
==== 2002 ====
2002 Arizona's 7th congressional district election
Party	Candidate	Votes	%
Democratic	Raúl Grijalva	61,256	59.0
Republican	Ross Hieb	38,474	37.1
Libertarian	John Nemeth	4,088	3.9
Majority		22,782	21.9
Total votes		103,818	100.0
Democratic win (new boundaries)			

==== 2004 ====
2004 Arizona's 7th congressional district election
Party	Candidate	Votes	%	±%
Democratic	Raúl Grijalva (incumbent)	108,868	62.1	+3.1
Republican	Joseph Sweeney	59,066	33.7	–3.4
Libertarian	Dave Kaplan	7,503	4.3	+0.3
Majority		49,802	28.4	+6.4
Total votes		175,437	100.0	
Democratic hold		Swing	+3.2	

==== 2006 ====
2006 Arizona's 7th congressional district election
Party	Candidate	Votes	%	±%
Democratic	Raúl Grijalva (incumbent)	80,354	61.1	–1.0
Republican	Ron Drake	46,498	35.4	+1.7
Libertarian	Joe Cobb	4,673	3.6	–0.7
Majority		33,856	25.7	–2.6
Total votes		131,525	100.0	
Democratic hold		Swing	–1.3	

==== 2008 ====
2008 Arizona's 7th congressional district election
Party	Candidate	Votes	%	±%
Democratic	Raúl Grijalva (incumbent)	124,304	63.3	+2.2
Republican	Joseph Sweeney	64,425	32.8	–2.6
Libertarian	Raymond Petrulsky	7,755	3.9	+0.4
Majority		59,879	30.5	+4.7
Total votes		196,489	100.0	
Democratic hold		Swing	+2.4	

==== 2010 ====
2010 Arizona's 7th congressional district election
Party	Candidate	Votes	%	±%
Democratic	Raúl Grijalva (incumbent)	79,935	50.2	–13.0
Republican	Ruth McClung	70,385	44.2	+11.4
Independent	Harley Meyer	4,506	2.8	N/a
Libertarian	George Keane	4,318	2.7	–1.2
Majority		9,550	6.0	–24.5
Total votes		159,144	100.0	
Democratic hold		Swing	–12.2	

=== 2012–2022 ===
==== 2012 ====
2012 Arizona's 7th congressional district election
Party	Candidate	Votes	%
Democratic	Ed Pastor (incumbent)	104,489	81.74
Libertarian	Joe Cobb	23,338	18.26
Majority		81,151	63.48
Total votes		127,827	100.0
Democratic win (new boundaries)			

==== 2014 ====
2014 Arizona's 7th congressional district election
Party	Candidate	Votes	%	±%
Democratic	Ruben Gallego	54,235	75.0	–6.7
Libertarian	Joe Cobb	10,715	14.8	–3.4
Americans Elect	Rebecca DeWitt	3,858	5.3	N/a
Independent	Jose Peñalosa	3,496	4.8	N/a
Majority		43,520	60.2	–3.3
Total votes		72,304	100.0	
Democratic hold		Swing	–1.6	

==== 2016 ====
2016 Arizona's 7th congressional district election
Party	Candidate	Votes	%	±%
Democratic	Ruben Gallego (incumbent)	119,465	75.2	+0.2
Republican	Eve Nunez	39,286	24.7	N/a
Green	Neil Westbrooks (Write-in)	60	0.0	N/a
Majority		80,179	50.5	–9.7
Total votes		158,811	100.0	
Democratic hold		Swing	–12.3	

==== 2018 ====
2018 Arizona's 7th congressional district election
Party	Candidate	Votes	%	±%
Democratic	Ruben Gallego (incumbent)	113,044	85.6	+10.4
Green	Gary Swing	18,706	14.2	+14.1
Republican	write ins	301	0.2	–24.5
Majority		94,338	71.4	+21.0
Total votes		132,051	100.0	
Democratic hold		Swing	–1.9	

==== 2020 ====
2020 Arizona's 7th congressional district election
Party	Candidate	Votes	%	±%
Democratic	Ruben Gallego (incumbent)	165,452	75.7	–8.9
Republican	Josh Barnett	50,226	23.3	+23.1
Libertarian	Roxanne Rodriguez (Write-in)	51	0.0	N/a
Write-in		3	0.0	N/a
Majority		115,226	53.4	–18.0
Total votes		215,732	100.0	
Democratic hold		Swing	–16.0	

=== 2022–present ===
==== 2022 ====
2022 Arizona's 7th congressional district election
Party	Candidate	Votes	%
Democratic	Raúl Grijalva (incumbent)	126,418	64.5
Republican	Luis Pozzolo	69,444	35.5
Majority		56,974	29.1
Total votes		195,862	100.0
Democratic win (new boundaries)			

==== 2024 ====
2024 Arizona's 7th congressional district election
Party	Candidate	Votes	%	±%
Democratic	Raúl Grijalva (incumbent)	171,954	63.4	–1.1
Republican	Daniel Butierez	99,057	36.6	+1.1
Majority		72,897	26.9	–2.2
Total votes		271,011	100.0	
Democratic hold		Swing	–1.1	

==== 2025 (special) ====
2025 Arizona's 7th congressional district special election
Party	Candidate	Votes	%	±%
Democratic	Adelita Grijalva	70,148	68.9	+5.5
Republican	Daniel Butierez	29,944	29.4	–7.1
Green	Eduardo Quintana	1,118	1.1	N/a
No Labels	Richard Grayson	537	0.5	N/a
Write-in		29	0.0	
Majority		40,204	39.5	+12.6
Total votes		101,776	100.0	
Democratic hold		Swing	+6.3	

== See also ==
- Arizona's congressional districts
- List of United States congressional districts
