= Arizona's 6th congressional district =

U.S. House district for Arizona

Coordinates: 33°40′01″N 111°53′19″W

- Interactive map of district boundaries since January 3, 2023
- Representative: Juan Ciscomani; R–Tucson
- Area: 724 mi^{2} (1,880 km^{2})
- Distribution: 96.8% urban; 3.2% rural
- Population (2025): 816,800
- Median household income: $82,890
- Ethnicity: 63.1% White; 24.7% Hispanic; 4.2% Two or more races; 3.3% Black; 3.0% Asian; 0.9% Native American; 0.7% other
- Cook PVI: EVEN

Arizona's 6th congressional district is a congressional district located in the U.S. state of Arizona and encompasses all of Greenlee County, most of Cochise County, and parts of Pima County, Pinal County and Graham County. It is the only district in Arizona that does not include any portion of Maricopa County. Most of its population resides in suburbs of Tucson, including Catalina Foothills, Oro Valley, Marana, Green Valley, and Vail. The district is currently represented by Republican Juan Ciscomani.

Considered a swing district, the 6th district is one of nine congressional districts (out of 435) with a Cook Partisan Voting Index of EVEN, indicating that the constituency, as a whole, does not lean one way or another.

The new 6th district includes a notable military presence. The Fort Huachuca installation is located in Cochise County, approximately 15 miles (24 km) north of the Mexican border, and is within the city of Sierra Vista.

== History ==
Arizona picked up a sixth district after the 1990 census. It covered the northeast quadrant of the state, from Flagstaff to the New Mexico border. Most of its population, however, was located in the northeastern portion of the Valley of the Sun, including Tempe and Scottsdale.

After the 2000 census, most of the Maricopa County portion of the old 6th became the 5th district, while the 6th was reconfigured to take in most of the former 1st district. It included parts of Mesa, Chandler and all of Gilbert as well as the fast-growing town of Queen Creek. It also contained the city of Apache Junction in Pinal County. For the first time since its creation in 1951, it didn't include any of Phoenix itself. The district and its predecessors had seen its share of Phoenix gradually reduced amid the Valley's explosive growth in the second half of the 20th century.

George W. Bush received 64% of the vote in this district in 2004. John McCain—who represented this district (then numbered as the 1st) from 1983 to 1987—received 61.32% of the vote in the district in 2008, making it his best showing in his home state.

After the 2010 census, the old 6th district essentially became the 5th district, while the 6th was redrawn to take in most of the old 3rd district. This district, in turn, had mostly been the 4th district from 1973 to 2003. This version of the 6th was anchored in northern Phoenix and Scottsdale. Initially heavily Republican, it became far less so in the 2010s; the Democrats nearly won it in 2018 and 2020.

After the 2020 census, this district essentially became the 1st district, while the 6th was reconfigured to take in much of the old 2nd district. Much of the current 6th's territory had been in the 5th district from 1983 to 2003 and the 8th district from 2003 to 2013.

== Composition ==
For the 118th and successive Congresses (based on redistricting following the 2020 census), the district contains the following counties and communities:

Cochise County (17)
Benson, Bowie, Douglas (part; also 7th), Dragoon, Elfrida, Huachuca City, Mescal, McNeal, St. David, San Simon, Sierra Vista, Sierra Vista Southeast, Sunizona, Sunsites, Tombstone, Whetstone, Wilcox

Graham County (10)
Bryce, Cactus Flats, Central, Fort Thomas, Pima, Safford, San Jose, Solomon, Swift Trail Junction, Thatcher

Greenlee County (5)
All 5 communities

Pima County (20)
Casas Adobes, Catalina, Catalina Foothills, Corona de Tucson, Elephant Head, Green Valley, J-Six Ranchettes, Kleindale, Marana, Nelson, Oro Valley, Sahuarita (part; also 7th), Rillito, Rincon Valley, Summerhaven, Tanque Verde, Tucson (part; also 7th), Tucson Mountains (part; also 7th), Vail, Willow Canyon

Pinal County (10)
Arizona City, Campo Bonito, Casa Grande (part; also 2nd), Eloy, Mammoth, Oracle, Picacho, Red Rock, Saddlebrooke, San Manuel

== Recent election results from statewide races ==
Year	Office	Results
2003–2013 Boundaries
2004	President	Bush 64.4% - 35.2%
2008	President	McCain 61.2% - 37.5%
2010	Senate	McCain 66.3% - 26.2%
2010	Governor	Brewer 62.5% - 33.9%
2010	Secretary of State	Bennett 67.6% - 32.3%
2010	Attorney General	Horne 59.0% - 40.8%
2010	Treasurer	Ducey 60.3% - 32.8%
2013–2023 Boundaries
2008	President	McCain 61.3% - 37.6%
2010	Senate	McCain 65.5% - 28.6%
2010	Governor	Brewer 58.1% - 38.8%
2012	President	Romney 59.5% - 38.82%
2012	Senate	Flake 55.4% - 40.3%
2014	Governor	Ducey 58.3% - 37.6%
2016	President	Trump 51.6% - 41.7%
2016	Senate	McCain 59.5% - 35.3%
2018	Senate	McSally 50.7% - 47.34%
2018	Governor	Ducey 60.0% - 38.2%
2018	Attorney General	Brnovich 55.8% - 44.0%
2020	President	Trump 51.4% - 47.3%
2020	Senate (Spec.)	McSally 51.8% - 48.3%
2023–2033 Boundaries
2016	President	Trump 49% - 44%
2016	Senate	McCain 53% - 41%
2018	Senate	McSally 50% - 48%
2018	Governor	Ducey 57% - 41%
2020	President	Biden 49.3% - 49.2%
2020	Senate (Spec.)	Kelly 50.5% - 49.5%
2022	Senate	Kelly 54% - 44%
2022	Governor	Hobbs 52% - 48%
2022	Secretary of State	Fontes 54% - 46%
2022	Attorney General	Mayes 52% - 48%
2022	Treasurer	Yee 54% - 46%
2024	President	Trump 50% - 49%
2024	Senate	Gallego 51% - 46%

== List of members representing the district ==
Arizona began sending a sixth member to the House after the 1990 census.

Representative	Party	Years	Cong ress	Electoral history	District location
District created January 3, 1993
Karan English (Flagstaff)	Democratic	January 3, 1993 – January 3, 1995	103rd	Elected in 1992. Lost re-election.	1993–2003: NE Arizona, including parts of Metro Phoenix: Apache, Gila, Greenlee, Coconino (part), Graham (part), Maricopa (part), Navajo (part), Pinal (part)
J. D. Hayworth (Scottsdale)	Republican	January 3, 1995 – January 3, 2003	104th 105th 106th 107th	First elected in 1994. Re-elected in 1996. Re-elected in 1998. Re-elected in 2000. Redistricted to the 5th district.	1993–2003: NE Arizona, including parts of Metro Phoenix: Apache, Gila, Greenlee, Coconino (part), Graham (part), Maricopa (part), Navajo (part), Pinal (part)
Jeff Flake (Mesa)	Republican	January 3, 2003 – January 3, 2013	108th 109th 110th 111th 112th	Redistricted from the 1st district. Re-elected in 2002. Re-elected in 2004. Re-elected in 2006. Re-elected in 2008. Re-elected in 2010. Retired to run for U.S. senator.	2003–2013: Parts of Metro Phoenix: Pima (part), Pinal (part)
David Schweikert (Fountain Hills)	Republican	January 3, 2013 – January 3, 2023	113th 114th 115th 116th 117th	Redistricted from the 5th district. Re-elected in 2012. Re-elected in 2014. Re-elected in 2016. Re-elected in 2018. Re-elected in 2020. Redistricted to the 1st district.	2013–2023:
Juan Ciscomani (Tucson)	Republican	January 3, 2023 – present	118th 119th	Elected in 2022. Re-elected in 2024. Lost re-election.	2023–present:
JoAnna Mendoza (Red Rock)	Democratic	Assuming office on January 3, 2027		Elected in 2026.	2023–present:

== Recent election results ==
Graph of election results in Arizona's 6th congressional district and its predecessors (Since 2000) View source data.

=== 2002–2012 ===
==== 2002 ====
Arizona's 6th Congressional District House Election, 2002
Party	Candidate	Votes	%
Republican	Jeff Flake (incumbent)	103,094	65.9
Democratic	Deborah Thomas	49,355	31.6
Libertarian	Andy Wagner	3,888	2.5
Majority		53,739	34.4
Total votes		156,337	100.0
Republican win (new boundaries)			

==== 2004 ====
Arizona's 6th Congressional District House Election, 2004
Party	Candidate	Votes	%	±%
Republican	Jeff Flake (incumbent)	202,882	79.4	+13.4
Libertarian	Craig Stritar	52,695	20.6	+18.1
Majority		150,187	58.8	+24.4
Total votes		255,577	100.0	
Republican hold		Swing	–2.3	

==== 2006 ====
Arizona's 6th Congressional District House Election, 2006
Party	Candidate	Votes	%	±%
Republican	Jeff Flake (incumbent)	152,201	74.8	–4.6
Libertarian	Jason Blair	51,285	25.2	+4.6
Majority		100,916	49.6	–9.2
Total votes		203,486	100.0	
Republican hold		Swing	–4.6	

==== 2008 ====
Arizona's 6th Congressional District House Election, 2008
Party	Candidate	Votes	%	±%
Republican	Jeff Flake (incumbent)	208,582	62.4	–12.4
Democratic	Rebecca Schneider	115,457	34.5	N/a
Libertarian	Rick Biondi	10,137	3.0	–22.2
Majority		93,125	27.9	–21.7
Total votes		334,176	100.0	
Republican hold		Swing	–23.5	

==== 2010 ====
Arizona's 6th Congressional District House Election, 2010
Party	Candidate	Votes	%	±%
Republican	Jeff Flake (incumbent)	165,649	66.4	+4.0
Democratic	Rebecca Schneider	72,615	29.1	–5.4
Libertarian	Darell Tapp	7,712	3.1	+0.1
Green	Richard Grayson	3,407	1.4	N/a
Majority		93,034	37.3	+9.4
Total votes		249,383	100.0	
Republican hold		Swing	+4.7	

=== 2012–2022 ===
==== 2012 ====
Arizona's 6th Congressional District House Election, 2012
Party	Candidate	Votes	%
Republican	David Schweikert (incumbent)	179,706	61.3
Democratic	Matt Jette	97,666	33.3
Libertarian	Jack Anderson	10,167	3.5
Green	Mark Salazar	5,637	1.9
Majority		82,040	28.0
Total votes		293,176	100.0
Republican win (new boundaries)			

==== 2014 ====
Arizona's 6th Congressional District House Election, 2014
Party	Candidate	Votes	%	±%
Republican	David Schweikert (incumbent)	129,578	64.9	+3.6
Democratic	W. John Williamson	70,198	35.1	+1.8
Majority		58,380	29.7	+1.7
Total votes		199,776	100.0	
Republican hold		Swing	+0.9	

==== 2016 ====
Arizona's 6th Congressional District House Election, 2016
Party	Candidate	Votes	%	±%
Republican	David Schweikert (incumbent)	201,578	62.1	–2.7
Democratic	W. John Williamson	122,866	37.9	+2.7
Majority		78,712	24.3	–5.5
Total votes		324,444	100.0	
Republican hold		Swing	–2.7	

==== 2018 ====
Arizona's 6th Congressional District House Election, 2018
Party	Candidate	Votes	%	±%
Republican	David Schweikert (incumbent)	173,140	55.2	–6.9
Democratic	Anita Malik	140,559	44.8	+6.9
Majority		32,581	10.4	–13.9
Total votes		313,699	100.0	
Republican hold		Swing	–6.9	

==== 2020 ====
Arizona's 6th Congressional District House Election, 2020
Party	Candidate	Votes	%	±%
Republican	David Schweikert (incumbent)	217,783	52.2	–3.0
Democratic	Hiral Tipirneni	199,644	47.8	+3.0
Majority		18,139	4.3	–6.0
Total votes		417,427	100.0	
Republican hold		Swing	–3.0	

=== 2022–present ===
==== 2022 ====
Arizona's 6th Congressional District House Election, 2022
Party	Candidate	Votes	%
Republican	Juan Ciscomani	177,201	50.7
Democratic	Kirsten Engel	171,969	49.2
Write-in		113	0.0
Majority		5,232	1.5
Total votes		349,283	100.0
Republican win (new boundaries)			

==== 2024 ====
Arizona's 6th Congressional District House Election, 2024
Party	Candidate	Votes	%	±%
Republican	Juan Ciscomani (incumbent)	215,596	50.0	–0.7
Democratic	Kirsten Engel	204,774	47.5	–1.7
Green	Athena Eastwood	10,759	2.5	N/a
Majority		10,822	2.5	+1.0
Total votes		431,129	100.0	
Republican hold		Swing	+0.5	

== See also ==
- Arizona's congressional districts
- List of United States congressional districts
