= Tohono Oʼodham Indian Reservation =

Indian reservation in Arizona

Coordinates: 32°09′01″N 112°02′41″W

Map shows the location of the majority of the Tohono Oʼodham Nation in Pima County, highlighting the large Tohono Oʼodham Reservation as well as the smaller San Xavier Reservation in red. The non-contiguous segments in Maricopa and Pinal counties are not shown.

The Tohono Oʼodham Nation Indian Reservation, is an Indian reservation of the Tohono Oʼodham Nation in Arizona, United States. The reservation had a 2020 census population of 9,561. It has an area of 4,340.984 square miles (11,243.098 km^{2}), 97.48 percent of the Tohono Oʼodham Nation's total area. The reservation encompasses parts of central Pima, southwestern Pinal, and southeastern Maricopa Counties.The Nation encompasses more than 2.8 million acres and shares 62-miles of international border with Mexico.

The land is also the site of the Quinlan and Baboquivari Mountains, which include Kitt Peak, and the Kitt Peak National Observatory and telescopes, as well as Baboquivari Peak. These astronomical sites are under lease from the Tohono Oʼodham Nation. The lease was approved by the council in the 1950s, for a one-time payment of US$25,000 plus $10 per acre per year.

Freeport-McMoRan operates the Cyprus Tohono Corportation mine in the North Komelik community Sif Oidak District in the northern part of the Nation. ASARCO operates a copper mine in the San Xavier District.

When Spaniards first encountered the tribe in 1694, they made note of one of the tribe's inhabited villages called Batki, a site that was abandoned around 1850. Batki was in what is now the Sells District of the Tohono O'odham Nation.

To this day, the Mission San Xavier del Bac offers visitors insights into the original Catholic mission, erected in the San Xavier District of the Nation.

== Tohono Oʼodham Nation Communities ==
There are more than 60 communites on the Tohono O'odham Nation including:

- Ak Chin, Pima County, Arizona
- Ali Chuk, Arizona
- Ali Chukson, Arizona
- Anegam, Arizona
- Artesa, Arizona
- Comobabi, Arizona
- Charco, Arizona
- Choulic, Arizona
- Chuichu, Arizona
- Cowlic, Arizona
- Gu Vo, Arizona
- Hickiwan, Arizona
- Jackrabbit, Arizona
- Kaka, Arizona
- Kohatk, Arizona
- Kuakatch, Arizona
- Nolic, Arizona
- North Komelik, Arizona
- Pisinemo, Arizona
- Queens Well, Arizona
- San Lucy Village, Arizona
- San Miguel, Arizona
- Sil Nakya, Arizona
- South Komelik, Arizona
- Tatk Kam Vo, Arizona
- Topawa, Arizona
- Vamori, Arizona

== Utilities ==
The telephone area code for the Tohono Oʼodham Reservation is 520.

The Tohono O’odham Utility Authority (TOUA), a tribal entity, was originally established in 1970 as the Papago Tribal Utility Authority (PTUA) by the Papago Tribal Council. Today, TOUA provides electric, water, internet, cellular, and telephone utility services to members of the Tohono O'odham Nation and some of the surrounding off-Nation communities.
