= List of Arizona placenames of Native American origin =

The following list includes settlements, geographic features, and political subdivisions of Arizona whose names are derived from Native American languages.

== Listings ==
=== Counties ===
- Apache County – named after the Apache people.
  - Shared with cities of Apache Junction, Fort Apache and Apache Lake.
- Cochise County – named after the eponymous Chiricahua chief, from k'uu-ch'ish, meaning "oak".
- Coconino County – named after the extinct Coconino tribe, of which the Havasupai are descended from.
- Gila County – from the Yuma phrase hah-quah-sa-eel, meaning "salty running water".
  - Shared with the city of Gila Bend, and the Gila River.
- Maricopa County – named after the Maricopa people.
  - Shared with the city of Maricopa, and the village of Maricopa Colony.
- Mohave County – named after the Mohave people.
  - Shared with the villages of Fort Mohave, Mohave Valley, and Mojave Ranch Estates.
- Navajo County – named after the Navajo people.
  - Shared with Navajo Springs.
- Pima County – named after the Pima people.
  - Shared with the city of Pima.
- Yavapai County – named after the Yavapai people.
- Yuma County – named after the Yuma people.
  - Shared with the city of Yuma.

=== Settlements ===
- Ak Chin – from the O'odham phrase 'akĭ-ciñ, whose English translation is unclear.
  - Shared with the village of Ak Chin in Pinal County, or the Ak-Chin Village, also in Pinal County.
- Chilchinbito – from the Navajo phrase tsiiłchin bii' tó, whose English translation is unclear.
- Cibecue – from the Apache phrase deshchíí'bikǫ, meaning "horizontal red canyon".
- Dennehotso – from the Navajo phrase deinihootso, whose English translation is unclear.
- Huachuca City
- Kaibito – from the Navajo phrase k'ai'bii'tó, whose English translation is unclear.
- Kinlichee – from the Navajo phrase kin dah lichi'i, meaning "red house up at an elevation".
- Lake Havasu City
- Lake Montezuma
- Mesquite Creek
- Nazlini – from the Navajo phrase nazlini, meaning "flowing in a crescent shape".
- Peoria
- Sahuarita
- Tsehili – from the Navajo phrase tseehyili, meaning "flowing into the rocks".
- Tucson – from O'odham cuk ṣon, "black base".
  - Shared with the cities of South Tucson and Corona de Tucson, as well as the village of Tucson Estates.
- Tusayan

=== Bodies of water ===
- Hasbidito Creek – from a Navajo phrase meaning "dove spring".
- Kinnikinick Lake
- Lake Bekihatso – from the Navajo phrase be'e k'id hatsoh, meaning "big pond".
- Segetoa Spring – from the Navajo phrase tsiyi't ohi, meaning "spring in the forest".
- Setsiltso Spring – from the Navajo phrase chech'il tsoh, meaning "big oak".
- Zuni River – named after the Zuni people.

=== Other ===
- Bakulai Mesa – from the Navajo phrase baa lo'k'aa'i, meaning "a place with reeds in it".
- Bitsihutios Butte – from the Navajo phrase bitsu'h hwits'os, meaning "tapered formation at its base".
- Canyon de Chelly
- Chinde Mesa
- Chinle
- Chusca Mountains
- Kin Tiel
- Klagetoh
- Lukachukai Mountains
- Tunitcha Mountains – from the Navajo phrase tontsaa, meaning "big water".

== See also ==
- List of place names in the United States of Native American origin
