= Ali Molina, Arizona =

CDP in Pima County, Arizona

- Census designated place
- Location of Ali Molina in Pima County, Arizona.

- Location of Ali Molina in Arizona
- Coordinates: 31°54′09″N 111°46′49″W
- Country: United States
- State: Arizona
- County: Pima

Area
  - Total: 0.77 sq mi (2.00 km^{2})
  - Land: 0.77 sq mi (2.00 km^{2})
  - Water: 0 sq mi (0.00 km^{2})
- Elevation: 2,644 ft (806 m)

Population (2020)
  - Total: 61
  - Density: 79.1/sq mi (30.55/km^{2})
- Time zone: UTC-7 (Mountain (MST))
  - Summer (DST): UTC-7 (MST)
- ZIP code: 85634
- Area code: 520
- FIPS code: 04-01620
- GNIS feature ID: 2582725

Ali Molina is a census designated place located in Pima County, Arizona, United States. It has a land area of 0.77 sq mi (2.0 km^{2}), and as of July 1, 2015, it had a population of 71. It is also unofficially known as Magdalena. Ali Molina is located within the Tohono O'odham Indian Reservation. It has an estimated elevation of 2,644 feet (806 m) above sea level.

== Demographics ==
Historical population
Census	Pop.	Note	%±
2020	61		—
U.S. Decennial Census

== Education ==
It is in the Indian Oasis-Baboquivari Unified School District.
