= Etoi Ki =

Mountain in Pima County, Arizona

- Location within Arizona Location within the United States

Highest point
- Elevation: 2,656 ft (810 m) NGVD 29
- Coordinates: 31°57′49″N 111°56′49″W

Geography
- Location: Pima County, Arizona, U.S.
- Topo map: USGS Sells West

Etoi Ki (O'odham: I'itoi kiꞌ) is a summit in the Pima County, Arizona, United States. It is west of Kitt Peak National Observatory and northwest of the unincorporated community of Sells. It is rises adjacent to Arizona State Route 86 across the highway from Bird Nest Hill on the Tohono O'odham Indian Reservation, about 62 miles (100 km) west of Tucson and 24 miles (39 km) north of the Mexican border.
