= Ak Chut Vaya, Arizona =

- Ghost town
- Location of Ak Chut Vaya in Arizona
- Coordinates: 31°37′50″N 111°48′34″W
- Country: United States
- State: Arizona
- County: Pima
- Elevation: 2,434 ft (742 m)
- Time zone: UTC-7 (Mountain (MST))
  - Summer (DST): UTC-7 (MST)
- ZIP codes: 85634
- Area code: 520
- FIPS code: 04-01100
- GNIS feature ID: 24296

Ak Chut Vaya was a populated place on the Tohono Oʼodham Reservation, in Pima County. The settlement was located on the Tohono Oʼodham Indian Reservation. The Tohono Oʼodham name "Ak Chut Vaya" translates to "arroyo well" in English. It has an estimated elevation of 2,434 feet (742 m) above sea level. As of 2019, the townsite consists of two abandoned buildings and can be classified as a ghost town. The site is approximately two miles (3.2 km) from San Miguel, Arizona.
