= Komelik =

Komelik may refer to the following places in the United States:

- Ak Komelik, Arizona, unincorporated community in Pima County, Arizona
- North Komelik, Arizona, unincorporated community in Pinal County, Arizona
- South Komelik, Arizona, census-designated place in Pima County, Arizona
