= Haivana Nakya, Arizona =

CDP in Pima County, Arizona

- CDP
- Location within the state of Arizona Haivana Nakya (the United States)
- Coordinates: 32°00′19″N 111°42′45″W
- Country: United States
- State: Arizona
- County: Pima

Area
  - Total: 1.86 sq mi (4.82 km^{2})
  - Land: 1.86 sq mi (4.82 km^{2})
  - Water: 0 sq mi (0.00 km^{2})
- Elevation: 285 ft (87 m)

Population (2020)
  - Total: 72
  - Density: 38.7/sq mi (14.94/km^{2})
- Time zone: UTC-7 (MST)
- ZIP code: 85634
- Area code: 520
- FIPS code: 04-30850
- GNIS feature ID: 2582796

Haivana Nakya, also known as Crow Hanging or Crow Hang Village, is a census-designated place (CDP) on the Tohono Oʼodham Indian Reservation in Pima County, Arizona, United States. The population was 96 at the 2010 census.

== Geography ==
Haivana Nakya is located at 32°00′19″N 111°42′45″W (32.005154, −111.712418). According to the United States Geological Survey, the CDP has a total area of 1.86 square miles (4.8 km^{2}), all land.

== Demographics ==
Historical population
| Census | Pop. | Note | %± |
|---|---|---|---|
| 2020 | 72 | | — |
U.S. Decennial Census

As of the 2010 census, there were 96 people living in the CDP: 47 male and 49 female. 40 were 19 years old or younger, 24 were ages 20–34, 12 were between the ages of 35 and 49, 15 were between 50 and 64, and the remaining 5 were aged 65 and above. The median age was 26 years.

The racial makeup of the CDP was 99% American Indian, and 1% two or more races. 1% of the population were Hispanic or Latino of any race.

There were 26 households in the CDP, 17 family households (65%) and 9 non-family households (35%), with an average household size of 3.7. Of the family households, 2 were married couples living together, 4 were single fathers, and 11 were single mothers; the non-family households included 6 adults living alone: 3 male and 3 female.

The CDP contained 39 housing units, of which 26 were occupied and 13 were vacant.

== Education ==
It is in the Indian Oasis-Baboquivari Unified School District.
