= Achi, Arizona =

- Ghost town
- Location of Achi in Arizona
- Coordinates: 32°20′40″N 112°00′53″W
- Country: United States
- State: Arizona
- County: Pima
- Elevation: 1,759 ft (536 m)
- Time zone: UTC-7 (Mountain (MST))
  - Summer (DST): UTC-7 (MST)
- Area code: 520
- FIPS code: 04-00135
- GNIS feature ID: 24292

Achi was a small, permanent village on the Tohono Oʼodham Reservation, in Pima County, Arizona United States. It has an estimated elevation of 1,759 feet (536 m) above sea level. As of 2019, there appeared to no longer be any residents or buildings in the village, thus classifying it as a ghost town. The site is approximately one mile northeast of the CDP limits of Santa Rosa. The name "Achi" derives from the O'odham word for "ridge."
