= Wahak Hotrontk, Arizona =

CDP in Pima County, Arizona

- Census-designated place
- Location of Wahak Hotrontk in Pima County, Arizona.

- Location within Arizona
- Coordinates: 32°10′58″N 112°21′56″W
- Country: United States
- State: Arizona
- County: Pima

Area
  - Total: 1.54 sq mi (3.99 km^{2})
  - Land: 1.54 sq mi (3.99 km^{2})
  - Water: 0 sq mi (0.00 km^{2})
- Elevation: 1,939 ft (591 m)

Population (2020)
  - Total: 88
  - Density: 57.1/sq mi (22.05/km^{2})
- Time zone: UTC-7 (Mountain (MST))
- ZIP code: 85634
- Area code: 520
- GNIS feature ID: 13276

Wahak Hotrontk, also known as San Simon (O'odham name translates as "Road Dips"), is a census-designated place in Pima County, in the U.S. state of Arizona. The population was 120 as of the 2020 census. It is located along Arizona State Route 86 on the Tohono O'odham Nation reservation.

== Geography ==
According to the U.S. Census Bureau, the community has an area of 1.541 square miles (3.99 km^{2}), all land.

Located on the west end of the traditional historical village is the San Simon Health Clinic and Tohono O'odham High School. Recently, the fifth convenience store and gas station located on the reservation also opened west of the community.

== Population ==
At the 2020 census there were 120 people, 35 households, and 22 families living in the CDP. The population density was 78 people per square mile. There were 48 housing units.

The median household income was $22,683. The per capita income for the CDP was $13,577.

== Demographics ==
Historical population
Census	Pop.	Note	%±
2020	88		—
U.S. Decennial Census

== Education ==
It is in the Indian Oasis-Baboquivari Unified School District.
