= Nolic, Arizona =

CDP in Pima County, Arizona

- CDP
- Location within the state of Arizona Nolic (the United States)
- Coordinates: 32°02′03″N 111°57′18″W
- Country: United States
- State: Arizona
- County: Pima

Area
  - Total: 0.52 sq mi (1.35 km^{2})
  - Land: 0.52 sq mi (1.35 km^{2})
  - Water: 0 sq mi (0.00 km^{2})
- Elevation: 2,379 ft (725 m)

Population (2020)
  - Total: 12
  - Density: 23.0/sq mi (8.87/km^{2})
- Time zone: UTC-7 (MST)
- ZIP code: 85634
- Area code: 520
- FIPS code: 04-49710
- GNIS feature ID: 2582831

Nolic is a census-designated place (CDP) located on the Tohono O'odham Indian Reservation in Pima County, Arizona, United States. The population was 37 at the 2010 census.

== Geography ==
Nolic is located at 32°02′03″N 111°57′18″W (32.034183, −111.955021). According to the United States Geological Survey, the CDP has a total area of 0.52 square miles (1.3 km^{2}), all land.

== Demographics ==
Historical population
Census	Pop.	Note	%±
2020	12		—
U.S. Decennial Census

As of the 2010 census, there were 37 people living in the CDP: 16 male and 21 female. 17 were 19 years old or younger, 6 were ages 20–34, 2 were between the ages of 35 and 49, 3 were between 50 and 64, and the remaining 9 were aged 65 and above. The median age was 25.5 years.

The racial makeup of the CDP was 95% American Indian, and 5% White. 8% of the population were Hispanic or Latino of any race.

There were 13 households in the CDP, nine family households (69%) and four non-family households (31%), with an average household size of 2.9. Of the family households, two were married couples living together, while there were one single father and six single mothers; the non-family households included four adults living alone: three male and one female.

The CDP contained 15 housing units, of which 13 were occupied and two were vacant.

== Education ==
It is in the Indian Oasis-Baboquivari Unified School District.
