= Anegam, Arizona =

- Populated place
- Location of Anegam in Pima County, Arizona.

- Location of Anegam in Arizona
- Coordinates: 32°22′22″N 112°01′51″W
- Country: United States
- State: Arizona
- County: Pima

Area
  - Total: 2.31 sq mi (5.99 km^{2})
  - Land: 2.31 sq mi (5.99 km^{2})
  - Water: 0 sq mi (0.00 km^{2})
- Elevation: 1,762 ft (537 m)

Population (2010)
  - Total: 151
  - Estimate (2016): N/A
  - Density: 65.3/sq mi (25.2/km^{2})
- Time zone: UTC-7 (Mountain (MST))
  - Summer (DST): UTC-7 (MST)
- ZIP code: 85634
- Area code: 520
- FIPS code: 025-02270
- GNIS feature ID: 652

Anegam (O'odham) name translates as "Desert Willow", is a populated place and census-designated place (CDP), situated on the Tohono O'odham Indian Reservation, in Pima County, Arizona, United States. Its population was 151 as of the 2010 census, and 154 as of July 1, 2015. It has an estimated elevation of 1,762 feet (537 m) above sea level.

== Demographics ==
Historical population
Census	Pop.	Note	%±
1960	35		—
2010	151		—
2020	149		−1.3%
U.S. Decennial Census

The population of Anegam was 35 in the 1960 census.

Anegam appeared on the 2010 U.S. census as a census-designated place (CDP), with 151 residents. As of the 2020 census the population was 149.

== Education ==
It is in the Indian Oasis-Baboquivari Unified School District.
