= Ahan Owuch, Arizona =

- Ghost town
- Location of Ahan Owuch in Arizona
- Coordinates: 32°08′33″N 112°20′36″W
- Country: United States
- State: Arizona
- County: Pima
- Elevation: 2,000 ft (600 m)
- Time zone: UTC-7 (Mountain (MST))
  - Summer (DST): UTC-7 (MST)
- ZIP codes: 85736
- Area code: 520
- FIPS code: 04-00765
- GNIS feature ID: 24295

Ahan Owuch was a populated place on the Tohono Oʼodham Reservation, in Pima County, Arizona, United States. The community was also known as Anuawooch.
