= Maish Vaya, Arizona =

CDP in Pima County, Arizona

- CDP
- Location within the state of Arizona Maish Vaya (the United States)
- Coordinates: 32°10′13″N 112°08′03″W
- Country: United States
- State: Arizona
- County: Pima

Area
  - Total: 4.24 sq mi (10.97 km^{2})
  - Land: 4.24 sq mi (10.97 km^{2})
  - Water: 0 sq mi (0.00 km^{2})
- Elevation: 2,556 ft (779 m)

Population (2020)
  - Total: 129
  - Density: 30.5/sq mi (11.76/km^{2})
- Time zone: UTC-7 (MST)
- ZIP code: 85634
- Area code: 520
- FIPS code: 04-43920
- GNIS feature ID: 2582821

Maish Vaya is a census-designated place (CDP) in Pima County, Arizona, United States. The population was 158 at the 2010 census.

== Geography ==
Maish Vaya is located at 32°10′13″N 112°08′03″W (32.170294, −112.134199). According to the United States Geological Survey, the CDP has a total area of 4.24 square miles (11.0 km^{2}), all land.

== Demographics ==
Historical population
Census	Pop.	Note	%±
2010	158		—
2020	129		−18.4%
U.S. Decennial Census

As of the 2010 census, there were 158 people living in the CDP: 80 male and 78 female. 59 were 19 years old or younger, 31 were ages 20–34, 26 were between the ages of 35 and 49, 30 were between 50 and 64, and the remaining 12 were aged 65 and above. The median age was 29.0 years.

The racial makeup of the CDP was 98.7% American Indian, 1.8% other, and 1.3% two or more races. 0.6% of the population were Hispanic or Latino of any race.

There were 41 households in the CDP, 33 family households (80.5%) and 8 non-family households (19.5%), with an average household size of 3.85. Of the family households, 12 were married couples living together, while there were 8 single fathers and 13 single others; the non-family households included 7 adults living alone: 2 male and 5 female.

The CDP contained 59 housing units, of which 41 were occupied and 18 were vacant.

== Education ==
It is in the Indian Oasis-Baboquivari Unified School District.
