= Chiawuli Tak, Arizona =

- CDP
- Location within the state of Arizona Chiawuli Tak, Arizona (the United States)
- Coordinates: 31°56′27″N 111°46′35″W
- Country: United States
- State: Arizona
- County: Pima

Area
  - Total: 2.44 sq mi (6.31 km^{2})
  - Land: 2.44 sq mi (6.31 km^{2})
  - Water: 0 sq mi (0.00 km^{2})
- Elevation: 2,635 ft (803 m)

Population (2020)
  - Total: 48
  - Density: 19.7/sq mi (7.61/km^{2})
- Time zone: UTC-7 (MST)
- ZIP code: 85634
- Area code: 520
- FIPS code: 04-12560
- GNIS feature ID: 2582753

Chiawuli Tak is both a census-designated place (CDP) as well as a populated place in Pima County, Arizona, United States. Chiawuli Tak means "the barrel cactus sits" in the O'odham language. It is also unofficially known as Geowic, Jeowic, or Tjeavolitak. The population was 78 at the 2010 census.

== Geography ==
Charco is located at 31°56′27″N 111°46′35″W (31.940955, −111.776472). According to the United States Geological Survey, the CDP has a total area of 0.93 square miles (2.4 km^{2}), all land.

== Demographics ==
Historical population
Census	Pop.	Note	%±
2020	48		—
U.S. Decennial Census

As of the 2010 census, there were 78 people living in the CDP: 40 male and 38 female. 34 were 19 years old or younger, 17 were ages 20–34, 13 were between the ages of 35 and 49, 8 were between 50 and 64, and the remaining 6 were aged 65 and above. The median age was 25.5 years.

The racial makeup of the CDP was 100% Native American. 2.6% of the population were Hispanic or Latino of any race.

There were 19 households in the CDP, 18 family households (94.7%) and 1 non-family household (5.3%), with an average household size of 4.11. Of the family households, there were 4 married couples living together, 4 single fathers, and 10 single mothers. The single non-family household consisted of 1 female.

The CDP contained 21 housing units, of which 19 were occupied and 2 were vacant.

== Education ==
It is in the Indian Oasis-Baboquivari Unified School District.
