= Gu Oidak, Arizona =

- CDP
- Location within the state of Arizona Gu Oidak (the United States)
- Coordinates: 31°55′18″N 112°02′56″W
- Country: United States
- State: Arizona
- County: Pima

Area
  - Total: 6.92 sq mi (17.92 km^{2})
  - Land: 6.92 sq mi (17.92 km^{2})
  - Water: 0 sq mi (0.00 km^{2})
- Elevation: 2,051 ft (625 m)

Population (2020)
  - Total: 126
  - Density: 18.2/sq mi (7.03/km^{2})
- Time zone: UTC-7 (Mountain (MST))
  - Summer (DST): UTC-7 (Mountain (MST))
- ZIP code: 85634
- Area code: 520
- FIPS code: 04-30550
- GNIS feature ID: 22470

Gu Oidak (also known as Big Fields or Kuoitak) is a census-designated place (CDP) located within the Tohono O'odham Nation Division in Pima County, Arizona, United States. The population was 198 at the 2020 census. The name "Gu Oidak" is the O'odham term for "big field" and located on the Tohono O'odham Nation reservation.

== Geography ==
Gu Oidak is located at 31°55′18″N 112°2′36″W, and has a total area of 7.09 sq mi (18.4 km^{2}), all land.

== Demographics ==
Historical population
Census	Pop.	Note	%±
2020	126		—
U.S. Decennial Census

As of the census of 2020, there were 198 people, 71 households, and 53 families living in the CDP. There were 94 housing units. The racial makeup of the CDP was 100% Native American.

Of the 67 households 37.3% had children under the age of 18 living with them, 9% were married couples living together, 40.3% had a female householder with no husband present, 13.4% had a male householder with no wife present, and 37.3% were non-families. 32.8% of households were one person and 7.5% were one person aged 65 or older. The average household size was 2.81 and the average family size was 3.48.

The age distribution was 34.1% under the age of 19, 16.5% from 20 to 34, 17.3% from 35 to 49, 23.4% from 50 to 64, and 8.9% 65 or older. The median age was 33.0 years. The population was evenly split with 50% females and 50% males. The CDP saw a population growth of 0.25% between 2010 and 2015, when it reached 191 people.

As of July 2016, the average home value was $94,565. The average household income was $41,044, with a per capita income of $11,407.

== Education ==
It is in the Indian Oasis-Baboquivari Unified School District.
