= Ali Chuk, Arizona =

- Populated place
- Location of Ali Chuk in Pima County, Arizona.

- Location of Ali Chuk in Arizona
- Coordinates: 31°49′01″N 112°33′30″W
- Country: United States
- State: Arizona
- County: Pima

Area
  - Total: 1.44 sq mi (3.73 km^{2})
  - Land: 1.44 sq mi (3.73 km^{2})
  - Water: 0 sq mi (0.00 km^{2})
- Elevation: 1,762 ft (537 m)

Population (2010)
  - Total: 161
  - Estimate (2016): N/A
  - Density: 112/sq mi (43.2/km^{2})
- Time zone: UTC-7 (Mountain (MST))
  - Summer (DST): UTC-7 (MST)
- ZIP code: 85634
- Area code: 520
- FIPS code: 025-01560
- GNIS feature ID: 2582723

Ali Chuk, also known as the Menager's Dam community, is a populated place and census designated place in Pima County, Arizona, United States. Its population was 161 as of the 2010 census, and it has a land area of 1.44 sq mi (3.7 km^{2}). It has an estimated elevation of 1,762 feet (537 m) above sea level. It is located adjacent to the border with Mexico. It is not to be confused with another village on the reservation, Ali Chukson. Due to its proximity to Menager's Dam, it is at risk of flooding.

== Demographics ==
Historical population
Census	Pop.	Note	%±
2010	161		—
2020	119		−26.1%
U.S. Decennial Census

Ali Chuk first appeared on the 2010 U.S. Census as a census-designated place (CDP).

== Education ==
It is in the Indian Oasis-Baboquivari Unified School District.
