= Comobabi, Arizona =

- CDP
- Location within the state of Arizona Comobabi, Arizona (the United States)
- Coordinates: 32°03′14″N 111°48′10″W
- Country: United States
- State: Arizona
- County: Pima

Area
  - Total: 0.82 sq mi (2.12 km^{2})
  - Land: 0.82 sq mi (2.12 km^{2})
  - Water: 0 sq mi (0.00 km^{2})
- Elevation: 3,297 ft (1,005 m)

Population (2020)
  - Total: 44
  - Density: 53.6/sq mi (20.71/km^{2})
- Time zone: UTC-7 (MST)
- FIPS code: 04-15080
- GNIS feature ID: 2582760

Comobabi is both a census-designated place (CDP) and a populated place in Pima County, Arizona, United States. The population was 8 in the 2010 Census of Population. It is located within the Tohono O'odham Indian Reservation.

== Geography ==
Comobabi is located at 32°03′14″N 111°48′10″W (32.053847, −111.802885). According to the United States Geological Survey, the CDP has a total area of 1.15 square miles (3.0 km^{2}), all land.

== Demographics ==
Historical population
Census	Pop.	Note	%±
2020	44		—
U.S. Decennial Census

As of the 2010 US Census, there were 8 people living in the CDP: 4 males and 4 females. 1 was 19 years old or younger, 1 was ages 20–34, 1 was between the ages of 35 and 49, 4 were between 50 and 64, and the remaining 1 was aged 65 and above. The median age was 53.0 years.

The racial makeup of the CDP was 100% Native American. 0% of the population were Hispanic or Latino of any race.

There were 3 households in the CDP, 2 family households (66.7%) and 1 non-family households (33.3%), with an average household size of 2.67. Of the family households, there were 1 married couples living together, and 1 single mothers.

The CDP contained 5 housing units, of which 3 were occupied and 2 were vacant.

== Education ==
It is in the Indian Oasis-Baboquivari Unified School District.
