= Charco, Arizona =

- CDP
- Location within the state of Arizona Charco, Arizona (the United States)
- Coordinates: 32°14′50″N 112°36′00″W
- Country: United States
- State: Arizona
- County: Pima

Area
  - Total: 0.93 sq mi (2.41 km^{2})
  - Land: 0.93 sq mi (2.41 km^{2})
  - Water: 0 sq mi (0.00 km^{2})
- Elevation: 2,100 ft (640 m)

Population (2020)
  - Total: 27
  - Density: 29/sq mi (11.2/km^{2})
- Time zone: UTC-7 (MST)
- ZIP code: 85634
- Area code: 520
- FIPS code: 04-12150
- GNIS feature ID: 2582752

Charco is both a census-designated place (CDP) and a populated place in Pima County, Arizona, United States. The population was 52 at the 2010 census.

== Geography ==
Charco is located at 32°14′50″N 112°36′00″W (32.247321, −112.600116). According to the United States Geological Survey, the CDP has a total area of 0.93 square miles (2.4 km^{2}), all land.

== Demographics ==
Historical population
Census	Pop.	Note	%±
2020	27		—
U.S. Decennial Census

As of the 2010 census, there were 52 people living in the CDP: 27 male and 25 female. 15 were 19 years old or younger, 15 were ages 20–34, 7 were between the ages of 35 and 49, 12 were between 50 and 64, and the remaining 3 were aged 65 and above. The median age was 31.0 years.

The racial makeup of the CDP was 98.1% Native American, and 1.9% Other. 11.5% of the population were Hispanic or Latino of any race.

There were 17 households in the CDP, 10 family households (58.8%) and 7 non-family households (41.2%), with an average household size of 3.06. Of the family households, there were 0 married couples living together, 3 single fathers, and 7 single mothers. Of the non-family households, 4 were a single person living alone, 3 male and 1 female.

The CDP contained 26 housing units, of which 17 were occupied and 9 were vacant.

== Education ==
It is in the Indian Oasis-Baboquivari Unified School District.
