= Willow Canyon, Arizona =

CDP in Pima County, Arizona

- Census-designated place
- Location of Willow Canyon in Pima County, Arizona.

- Location within Arizona
- Coordinates: 32°23′19″N 110°41′55″W
- Country: United States
- State: Arizona
- County: Pima

Area
  - Total: 0.37 sq mi (0.96 km^{2})
  - Land: 0.37 sq mi (0.96 km^{2})
  - Water: 0 sq mi (0.00 km^{2})
- Elevation: 6,972 ft (2,125 m)

Population (2020)
  - Total: 2
  - Density: 5.4/sq mi (2.09/km^{2})
- Time zone: UTC-7 (Mountain (MST))
- Area code: 520
- GNIS feature ID: 36223

Willow Canyon is a census-designated place in Pima County, in the U.S. state of Arizona. The population was "S" (Seasonal) at the 2010 census.

== Geography ==
The community is an area of USFS Recreation Residences within the Coronado National Forest, north of Tucson on the Catalina Highway. According to the U.S. Census Bureau, the community has an area of 0.333 square miles (0.86 km^{2}), all land.

== Demographics ==
Historical population
Census	Pop.	Note	%±
2010	1		—
2020	2		100.0%
U.S. Decennial Census

== Education ==
It is not in any school district. The Pima County School Superintendent arranges for education of K-12 students living in areas without school districts.
