= Elephant Head, Arizona =

CDP in Pima County, Arizona

- CDP
- Location within the state of Arizona Elephant Head (the United States)
- Coordinates: 31°45′57″N 110°59′31″W
- Country: United States
- State: Arizona
- County: Pima

Area
  - Total: 7.25 sq mi (18.78 km^{2})
  - Land: 7.25 sq mi (18.78 km^{2})
  - Water: 0 sq mi (0.00 km^{2})
- Elevation: 3,104 ft (946 m)

Population (2020)
  - Total: 588
  - Density: 81.1/sq mi (31.31/km^{2})
- Time zone: UTC-7 (MST)
- Area code: 520
- FIPS code: 04-21980
- GNIS feature ID: 2582780

Elephant Head is a census-designated place (CDP) in Pima County, Arizona, United States. The population was 612 at the 2010 census.

== Geography ==
Elephant Head is located at 31°45′57″N 110°59′31″W (31.765870, −110.992047). According to the United States Geological Survey, the CDP has a total area of 7.43 square miles (19.2 km^{2}), all land.

== Demographics ==
Historical population
Census	Pop.	Note	%±
2020	588		—
U.S. Decennial Census

As of the 2010 census, there were 612 people living in the CDP: 310 male and 302 female. 145 were 19 years old or younger, 60 were ages 20–34, 101 were between the ages of 35 and 49, 216 were between 50 and 64, and the remaining 94 were aged 65 and above. The median age was 59.0 years.

The racial makeup of the CDP was 87.9% White, 1.6% American Indian, 1.5% Asian, 6.5% Other, and 2.5% Two or More Races. 26.6% of the population were Hispanic or Latino of any race.

There were 233 households in the CDP, 172 family households (73.8%) and 61 non-family households (26.2%), with an average household size of 2.63. Of the family households, 156 were married couples living together, while there were 5 single fathers, and 11 single mothers; the non-family households included 44 adults living alone: 20 male and 24 female.

The CDP contained 253 housing units, of which 233 were occupied and 20 were vacant.

== Education ==
The CDP is divided between the Continental Elementary School District and the Sahuarita Unified School District.
