= Ali Chukson, Arizona =

CDP in Pima County, Arizona

- Census designated place
- Location of Ali Chukson in Pima County, Arizona.

- Location of Ali Chukson in Arizona
- Coordinates: 31°54′41″N 111°48′06″W
- Country: United States
- State: Arizona
- County: Pima

Area
  - Total: 2.07 sq mi (5.36 km^{2})
  - Land: 2.07 sq mi (5.36 km^{2})
  - Water: 0 sq mi (0.00 km^{2})
- Elevation: 2,579 ft (786 m)

Population (2020)
  - Total: 113
  - Density: 54.6/sq mi (21.09/km^{2})
- Time zone: UTC-7 (Mountain (MST))
  - Summer (DST): UTC-7 (MST)
- ZIP code: 85634
- Area code: 520
- FIPS code: 04-01570
- GNIS feature ID: 2582724

Ali Chukson (O'odham: ʼAli Cuk Ṣon; English: Little Tucson) is a populated place and census designated place in Pima County, Arizona, United States. Its population was 113 as of the 2020 census. It is not to be confused with another village on the reservation, Ali Chuk.

== Demographics ==
Historical population
Census	Pop.	Note	%±
2010	132		—
2020	113		−14.4%
U.S. Decennial Census

== Education ==
It is in the Indian Oasis-Baboquivari Unified School District.
