= Ak Chin, Pima County, Arizona =

CDP in Pima County, Arizona

Ak Chin, Arizona
- Census-designated place
- Location of Ak Chin in Pima County, Arizona.

- Location of Ak Chin in Arizona
- Coordinates: 32°17′14″N 112°00′33″W
- Country: United States
- State: Arizona
- County: Pima

Area
  - Total: 0.53 sq mi (1.36 km^{2})
  - Land: 0.53 sq mi (1.36 km^{2})
  - Water: 0 sq mi (0.00 km^{2})
- Elevation: 1,854 ft (565 m)

Population (2020)
  - Total: 50
  - Density: 95.0/sq mi (36.69/km^{2})
- Time zone: UTC-7 (Mountain (MST))
  - Summer (DST): UTC-7 (MST)
- ZIP codes: 85634
- Area code: 520
- FIPS code: 04-00940
- GNIS feature ID: 2582721

Ak Chin, is a rural native village and a census-designated place on the Tohono Oʼodham Reservation, in Pima County, Arizona, United States. It had a population of 30 as of the 2010 U.S. Census and an estimated population of 31 as of July 1, 2015. Ak Chin has an estimated elevation of 1,854 feet (565 m) above sea level.

It is not to be confused with either Ak-Chin Village or with Ak Chin, a populated place located within Ak-Chin Village.

== Demographics ==
Historical population
Census	Pop.	Note	%±
2010	30		—
2020	50		66.7%
U.S. Decennial Census

Ak-Chin first appeared on the 2010 U.S. Census as a census-designated place (CDP).

== Education ==
It is in the Indian Oasis-Baboquivari Unified School District.
