= Valley Farms, Arizona =

Town in Pinal County, Arizona

- unincorporated town
- Location within Arizona Location within the United States
- Coordinates: 32°59′18″N 111°26′50″W
- Country: United States
- State: Arizona
- County: Pinal
- Elevation: 1,480 ft (450 m)
- Time zone: UTC-7 (Mountain (MST))
- ZIP code: 85291
- Area code: 520
- GNIS feature ID: 13168

Valley Farms is an unincorporated town in Pinal County, Arizona, United States, 4.5 miles (7.2 km) east of Coolidge. It has a post office with ZIP code 85191.
