= Ventana, Arizona =

CDP in Pima County, Arizona

- Census-designated place
- Location of Ventana in Pima County, Arizona.

- Location within Arizona
- Coordinates: 32°27′58″N 112°14′36″W
- Country: United States
- State: Arizona
- County: Pima

Area
  - Total: 1.04 sq mi (2.69 km^{2})
  - Land: 1.04 sq mi (2.69 km^{2})
  - Water: 0 sq mi (0.00 km^{2})
- Elevation: 2,238 ft (682 m)

Population (2020)
  - Total: 52
  - Density: 50.2/sq mi (19.37/km^{2})
- Time zone: UTC-7 (Mountain (MST))
- ZIP code: 85634
- Area code: 520
- GNIS feature ID: 13212

Ventana is a census-designated place in Pima County, in the U.S. state of Arizona. The population was 52 at the 2020 census. The place takes its name from the Spanish word for "window" and is located in the northeastern part of the Tohono O'odham Nation reservation.

== Geography ==
According to the U.S. Census Bureau, the community has an area of 1.037 square miles (2.69 km^{2}), all land.

== Demographics ==
At the 2020 census, there were 52 people, 16 households, and 10 families living in the CDP. The population density was 50 people per square mile. There were 30 housing units.

The median household income was $20,587. The per capita income for the CDP was $13,461.

Historical population
| Census | Pop. | Note | %± |
|---|---|---|---|
| 2020 | 52 | | — |
U.S. Decennial Census
