= Ko Vaya, Arizona =

CDP in Pima County, Arizona

- CDP
- Location within the state of Arizona Ko Vaya (the United States)
- Coordinates: 32°04′53″N 111°53′45″W
- Country: United States
- State: Arizona
- County: Pima

Area
  - Total: 1.10 sq mi (2.85 km^{2})
  - Land: 1.10 sq mi (2.85 km^{2})
  - Water: 0 sq mi (0.00 km^{2})
- Elevation: 2,710 ft (826 m)

Population (2020)
  - Total: 43
  - Density: 39/sq mi (15.1/km^{2})
- Time zone: UTC-7 (MST)
- ZIP code: 85634
- Area code: 520
- FIPS code: 04-38950
- GNIS feature ID: 2582811

Ko Vaya is a census-designated place (CDP) in Pima County, Arizona, United States. The population was 46 at the 2010 census.

== Geography ==
Drysdale is located at 32°04′53″N 111°53′45″W (32.081502, −111.895875). According to the United States Geological Survey, the CDP has a total area of 1.1 square miles (2.8 km^{2}), all land.

== Demographics ==
Historical population
Census	Pop.	Note	%±
2020	43		—
U.S. Decennial Census

As of the 2010 census, there were 46 people living in the CDP: 24 male and 22 female. 15 were 19 years old or younger, 7 were ages 20–34, 10 were between the ages of 35 and 49, 10 were between 50 and 64, and the remaining 4 were aged 65 and above. The median age was 36.5 years.

The racial makeup of the CDP was 84.8% American Indian, 10.9% White, 2.2% Other, and 2.2% two or more races. 10.9% of the population were Hispanic or Latino of any race.

There were 15 households in the CDP, 12 family households (80%) and 3 non-family households (20%), with an average household size of 3.07. Of the family households, 5 were married couples living together, while there were 4 single fathers and 5 single mothers; the non-family households were all males living alone.

The CDP contained 16 housing units, of which 15 were occupied and 1 was vacant.
