= J-Six Ranchettes, Arizona =

CDP in Pima County, Arizona

- Census-designated place
- Location within Arizona Location within the United States
- Coordinates: 31°58′00″N 110°27′59″W
- Country: United States
- State: Arizona
- County: Pima

Area
  - Total: 4.53 sq mi (11.72 km^{2})
  - Land: 4.53 sq mi (11.72 km^{2})
  - Water: 0 sq mi (0.00 km^{2})
- Elevation: 4,094 ft (1,248 m)

Population (2020)
  - Total: 647
  - Density: 143.0/sq mi (55.23/km^{2})
- Time zone: UTC-7 (MST)
- ZIP Code: 85602 (Benson)
- FIPS code: 04-36440
- GNIS feature ID: 2582841

J-Six Ranchettes is an unincorporated community and census-designated place (CDP) in Pima County, Arizona, United States. It is bordered to the east by Cochise County and is located along Interstate 10, 9 miles (14 km) west of Benson and 38 miles (61 km) southeast of Tucson. It was first listed as a CDP prior to the 2020 census. It overlaps completely or primarily with the CDP Pima County Two (Pimaco Two).

== Geography ==
According to the United States Geological Survey, the Pimaco Two CDP had a total area of 4.54 square miles (11.8 km^{2}), all land.

== Demographics ==
Historical population
Census	Pop.	Note	%±
2020	647		—
U.S. Decennial Census

=== As Pimaco Two ===
Historical population
Census	Pop.	Note	%±
2020	647		—
U.S. Decennial Census

As of the 2010 census, there were 682 people living in the CDP: 339 male and 343 female. 163 were 19 years old or younger, 67 were ages 20–34, 137 were between the ages of 35 and 49, 179 were between 50 and 64, and the remaining 136 were aged 65 and above. The median age was 47.6 years.

The racial makeup of the CDP was 89.6% White, 1.8% American Indian, 1.0% Asian, 0.4% Black or African American, 6.3% Other, and 0.9% two or more races. 13.9% of the population were Hispanic or Latino of any race.

There were 280 households in the CDP, 212 family households (75.7%) and 68 non-family households (24.3%), with an average household size of 2.44. Of the family households, 167 were married couples living together, while there were 19 single fathers and 26 single mothers; the non-family households included 61 adults living alone: 29 male and 32 female.

The CDP contained 313 housing units, of which 280 were occupied and 33 were vacant.

As of July 2016, the average home value in Pimaco Two was $357,799. The average household income was $64,268, with a per capita income of $25,318.

== Education ==
The CDP is in the Vail Unified School District.
