= Ak-Chin Village, Arizona =

CDP in Pinal County, Arizona

- CDP
- Location of Ak-Chin Village, Arizona

- Location of Ak-Chin Village in Arizona
- Coordinates: 33°1′48″N 112°3′44″W
- Country: United States
- State: Arizona
- County: Pinal

Area
  - Total: 10.54 sq mi (27.29 km^{2})
  - Land: 10.54 sq mi (27.29 km^{2})
  - Water: 0 sq mi (0.00 km^{2})
- Elevation: 1,204 ft (367 m)

Population (2020)
  - Total: 884
  - Density: 83.9/sq mi (32.39/km^{2})
- Time zone: UTC-7 (Mountain (MST))
- ZIP code: 85139
- Area code: 520
- FIPS code: 04-01090
- GNIS feature ID: 1866978

Ak-Chin Village (O'odham: ʼAkĭ Ciñ) is a census-designated place (CDP) in Pinal County, Arizona, United States on the Ak-Chin (Maricopa) Reservation. The population was 862 at the 2010 census, up from 669 in 2000.

== Geography ==
Ak-Chin Village is located at 33°1′48″N 112°3′44″W (33.029871, −112.062105).

According to the United States Census Bureau, the CDP has a total area of 10.5 square miles (27 km^{2}), all land.

== Demographics ==
Historical population
Census	Pop.	Note	%±
1990	353		—
2000	669		89.5%
2010	862		28.8%
2020	884		2.6%

Ak-Chin Village first appeared on the 1990 U.S. Census as a census-designated place (CDP).

At the 2000 census there were 669 people, 197 households, and 157 families in the CDP. The population density was 63.8 inhabitants per square mile (24.6/km^{2}). There were 212 housing units at an average density of 20.2 per square mile (7.8/km^{2}). The racial makeup of the CDP was 4.0% White, 0.3% Black or African American, 91.6% Native American, 3.3% from other races, and 0.8% from two or more races. 9.0% of the population were Hispanic or Latino of any race. Of the 197 households 49.7% had children under the age of 18 living with them, 39.6% were married couples living together, 28.9% had a female householder with no husband present, and 19.8% were non-families. 17.3% of households were one person and 1.5% were one person aged 65 or older. The average household size was 3.40 and the average family size was 3.81.

The age distribution was 41.4% under the age of 18, 10.0% from 18 to 24, 30.5% from 25 to 44, 14.2% from 45 to 64, and 3.9% 65 or older. The median age was 24 years. For every 100 females, there were 83.8 males. For every 100 females age 18 and over, there were 85.8 males.

The median household income was $23,897 and the median family income was $28,125. Males had a median income of $19,545 versus $21,875 for females. The per capita income for the CDP was $8,389. About 24.8% of families and 26.8% of the population were below the poverty line, including 34.6% of those under age 18 and 22.2% of those age 65 or over.

== Education ==
It is within the Maricopa Unified School District.
