= Arivaca Junction, Arizona =

CDP in Pima County, Arizona

- Census Designated Place
- Location of Arivaca Junction in Pima County, Arizona.

- Location of Arivaca Junction in Arizona
- Coordinates: 31°44′20″N 111°04′26″W
- Country: United States
- State: Arizona
- County: Pima

Area
  - Total: 2.95 sq mi (7.65 km^{2})
  - Land: 2.95 sq mi (7.65 km^{2})
  - Water: 0 sq mi (0.00 km^{2})
- Elevation: 3,140 ft (957 m)

Population (2020)
  - Total: 970
  - Density: 328.4/sq mi (126.79/km^{2})
- Time zone: UTC-7 (Mountain (MST))
  - Summer (DST): UTC-7 (MST)
- Area code: 520
- FIPS code: 04-03380
- GNIS feature ID: 2582731

Arivaca Junction is a census-designated place (CDP) in Pima County, Arizona, United States. The population was 970 at the 2020 census, down from 1,090 at the 2010 census. As of July 1, 2015, it had an estimated population of 1,065. Arivaca Junction has an estimated elevation of 3,140 feet (960 m) above sea level.

== Demographics ==
Historical population
Census	Pop.	Note	%±
2010	1		—
2020	970		96,900.0%
U.S. Decennial Census
