= Rincon Valley, Arizona =

CDP in Pima County, Arizona

- CDP
- Location of Rincon Valley in Pima County, Arizona.

- Location in the United States
- Coordinates: 32°6′44″N 110°41′16″W
- Country: United States
- State: Arizona
- County: Pima

Area
  - Total: 25.44 sq mi (65.90 km^{2})
  - Land: 25.44 sq mi (65.90 km^{2})
  - Water: 0 sq mi (0.00 km^{2})

Population (2020)
  - Total: 5,612
  - Density: 220.6/sq mi (85.16/km^{2})
- Time zone: UTC-7 (MST (no DST))
- FIPS code: 04-60120

Rincon Valley is a census-designated place (CDP) in the Rincon Valley, in Pima County, Arizona, United States. The population was 5,139 at the 2010 census.

The racial and ethnic composition of the population was 79.9% non-Hispanic white, 1.5% black or African American, 0.3% Native American, 1.6% Asian, 0.1% non-Hispanic from some other race, 2.5% two or more races and 15.0% Hispanic or Latino.

== Demographics ==
Historical population
| Census | Pop. | Note | %± |
|---|---|---|---|
| 2020 | 5,612 | | — |
U.S. Decennial Census

=== 2020 census ===
As of the 2020 census, Rincon Valley had a population of 5,612. The median age was 49.1 years. 21.1% of residents were under the age of 18 and 23.6% of residents were 65 years of age or older. For every 100 females there were 99.1 males, and for every 100 females age 18 and over there were 95.9 males age 18 and over.

56.1% of residents lived in urban areas, while 43.9% lived in rural areas.

There were 2,134 households in Rincon Valley, of which 28.0% had children under the age of 18 living in them. Of all households, 71.2% were married-couple households, 11.2% were households with a male householder and no spouse or partner present, and 13.2% were households with a female householder and no spouse or partner present. About 16.7% of all households were made up of individuals and 9.1% had someone living alone who was 65 years of age or older.

There were 2,269 housing units, of which 5.9% were vacant. The homeowner vacancy rate was 1.3% and the rental vacancy rate was 2.4%.

Racial composition as of the 2020 census
| Race | Number | Percent |
|---|---|---|
| White | 4,466 | 79.6% |
| Black or African American | 124 | 2.2% |
| American Indian and Alaska Native | 27 | 0.5% |
| Asian | 73 | 1.3% |
| Native Hawaiian and Other Pacific Islander | 8 | 0.1% |
| Some other race | 197 | 3.5% |
| Two or more races | 717 | 12.8% |
| Hispanic or Latino (of any race) | 878 | 15.6% |

== Education ==
The CDP is in the Vail Unified School District.
