= Santa Rosa, Arizona =

CDP in Pima County, Arizona

Santa Rosa, Arizona O'odham: Kaij Mek
- CDP
- Location in Pima County and the state of Arizona

- Location in Arizona Location in the United States
- Coordinates: 32°19′33″N 112°2′34″W
- Country: United States
- State: Arizona
- County: Pima

Area
  - Total: 6.51 sq mi (16.86 km^{2})
  - Land: 6.51 sq mi (16.86 km^{2})
  - Water: 0 sq mi (0.00 km^{2})
- Elevation: 1,811 ft (552 m)

Population (2020)
  - Total: 474
  - Density: 72.8/sq mi (28.11/km^{2})
- Time zone: UTC-7 (MST (no DST))
- ZIP code: 85634
- Area code: 520
- FIPS code: 04-64310
- GNIS feature ID: 5407

Santa Rosa, or Kaij Mek (O'odham) name translates as "Burnt Seeds", is a census-designated place (CDP) in Pima County, Arizona, United States. The population was 671 as of the 2020 census. This makes Santa Rosa the most populated historical traditional village on the Tohono O'odham Nation reservation.

== Geography ==
Santa Rosa is located at 32°19′33″N 112°2′34″W (32.325904, -112.042709).

According to the United States Census Bureau, the CDP has a total area of 5.7 square miles (15 km^{2}), all land.

== Demographics ==
Historical population
Census	Pop.	Note	%±
2020	474		—
U.S. Decennial Census

At the 2020 census there were 671 people, 174 households, and 133 families living in the CDP. The population density was 103 inhabitants per square mile (40/km^{2}). There were 231 housing units at an average density of 26.2 per square mile (10.1/km^{2}). The racial makeup of the CDP was <1% White, 99% Native American, <1% from other races, and <1% from two or more races. 1% of the population were Hispanic or Latino of any race. Of the 174 households 33% had children under the age of 18 living with them, 28% were married couples living together, 29% had a female householder with no husband present, and 27% were non-families. 22% of households were one person and 9% were one person aged 65 or older. The average household size was 3 and the average family size was 4.

The age distribution was 34% under the age of 18, 9% from 18 to 24, 28% from 25 to 44, 19% from 45 to 64, and 11% 65 or older. The median age was 29 years. For every 100 females, there were 92 males. For every 100 females age 18 and over, there were 93 males.

The median household income was $9,243 and the median family income was $12,000. Males had a median income of $22,813 versus $23,438 for females. The per capita income for the CDP was $6,090. About 50% of families and 51% of the population were below the poverty line, including 55% of those under age 18 and 69% of those age 65 or over.
