= San Miguel, Arizona =

CDP in Pima County, Arizona

- CDP
- Location of San Miguel in Pima County, Arizona.

- Location in the United States
- Coordinates: 31°37′46″N 111°46′49″W
- Country: United States
- State: Arizona
- County: Pima
- Tribe: Tohono O'odham Nation

Area
  - Total: 5.65 sq mi (14.64 km^{2})
  - Land: 5.65 sq mi (14.64 km^{2})
  - Water: 0 sq mi (0.00 km^{2})

Population (2020)
  - Total: 205
  - Density: 36/sq mi (14/km^{2})
- Time zone: UTC-7 (MST (no DST))
- ZIP code: 85634
- Area code: 520
- FIPS code: 04-63610

San Miguel is a census-designated place in Pima County, in the U.S. state of Arizona. The population was 207 as of the 2020 census. San Miguel is located near the border with Mexico on the Tohono O'odham Nation reservation.

== Demographics ==
Historical population
Census	Pop.	Note	%±
2020	205		—
U.S. Decennial Census

At the 2020 census there were 207 people, 59 households, and 43 families living in the CDP. The population density was 37 people per square mile. There were 82 housing units.

The median household income was $22,106. The per capita income for the CDP was $11,430.

== Education ==
It is in the Indian Oasis-Baboquivari Unified School District.
