= Cowlic, Arizona =

CDP in Pima County, Arizona

- CDP
- Location of Cowlic in Pima County, Arizona.

- Location in the United States
- Coordinates: 31°48′30″N 111°59′20″W
- Country: United States
- State: Arizona
- County: Pima

Area
  - Total: 0.80 sq mi (2.07 km^{2})
  - Land: 0.80 sq mi (2.07 km^{2})
  - Water: 0 sq mi (0.00 km^{2})

Population (2020)
  - Total: 105
  - Density: 131.3/sq mi (50.69/km^{2})
- Time zone: UTC-7 (MST (no DST))
- ZIP code: 85634
- Area code: 520
- FIPS code: 04-16830
- GNIS feature ID: 2582765

Cowlic or Kawulk (O'odham) name translates as "The Hill", is a census-designated place (CDP) in Pima County, Arizona, United States. The population was 147 as of the 2020 census. It is located on the Tohono O'odham Nation reservation.

== Demographics ==
At the 2020 census there were 147 people, 32 households, and 24 families living in the CDP. The population density was 178 people per square mile. There were 42 housing units.

The median household income was $20,620. The per capita income for the CDP was $11,415.

Historical population
Census	Pop.	Note	%±
2020	105		—
U.S. Decennial Census

== Toponymy ==
It has frequently been noted on lists of unusual place names.
