= Kaka, Arizona =

CDP in Maricopa County, Arizona

Kaka, Arizona O'odham: Gagka
- Census-designated place
- Location in Maricopa County, Arizona

- Location within Arizona Location within the United States
- Coordinates: 32°30′41″N 112°18′59″W
- Country: United States
- State: Arizona
- County: Maricopa

Area
  - Total: 0.50 sq mi (1.29 km^{2})
  - Land: 0.50 sq mi (1.29 km^{2})
  - Water: 0 sq mi (0.00 km^{2})
- Elevation: 2,251 ft (686 m)

Population (2020)
  - Total: 83
  - Density: 167.0/sq mi (64.48/km^{2})
- Time zone: UTC-7 (MST (no DST))
- Area code: 928
- FIPS code: 04-36780
- GNIS feature ID: 2582804

Kaka (O'odham: Gagka, translates as "A Clearing") is a census-designated place (CDP) in Maricopa County, Arizona, United States, located in the Tohono O'odham Nation. The population was 83 at the 2020 census, down from 141 at the 2010 census.

== Toponymy ==
It has frequently been noted on lists of unusual place names.

== Geography ==
Kaka is in southernmost Maricopa County, nearly touching the border with Pima County. It is 88 miles (142 km) south-southwest of Phoenix, 106 miles (171 km) west-northwest of Tucson, and 67 miles (108 km) northeast of the Mexican border at Lukeville.

== Demographics ==
At the 2020 census there were 83 people and 28 households living in the CDP.

The median household income was $39,573. The per capita income for the CDP was $13,965.

Historical population
Census	Pop.	Note	%±
2010	141		—
2020	83		−41.1%
U.S. Decennial Census

As of the census of 2010, there were 141 people living in the CDP. The population density was 545.0 people per square mile. The racial makeup of the CDP was 99% Native American and 1% from some other race. 6% of the population were Hispanic or Latino of any race.
