= Nelson, Pima County, Arizona =

CDP in Pima County, Arizona

Nelson, Arizona
- CDP
- Location within the state of Arizona Nelson (the United States)
- Coordinates: 32°25′47″N 111°15′54″W
- Country: United States
- State: Arizona
- County: Pima

Area
  - Total: 0.47 sq mi (1.23 km^{2})
  - Land: 0.47 sq mi (1.23 km^{2})
  - Water: 0 sq mi (0.00 km^{2})
- Elevation: 1,975 ft (602 m)

Population (2020)
  - Total: 249
  - Density: 525.8/sq mi (203.02/km^{2})
- Time zone: UTC-7 (MST)
- Area code: 520
- FIPS code: 04-49100
- GNIS feature ID: 2582830

Nelson is a census-designated place (CDP) in Pima County, Arizona, United States. The population was 249 at the 2020 census, down from 259 at the 2010 census.

== History ==
As early as 1934, Nelson appeared as a named location, remaining undeveloped until 1973. At the 2010 census, the area was designated as a CDP in Pima County, listed as part of the Marana CCD.

== Geography ==
Nelson is located at 32°25′47″N 111°15′54″W (32.42981, −111.264924). According to the United States Geological Survey, the CDP has a total area of 0.48 square miles (1.2 km^{2}), all land.

== Demographics ==
Historical population
Census	Pop.	Note	%±
2020	249		—
U.S. Decennial Census

As of the 2010 census, there were 259 people living in the CDP: 123 male and 136 female. 73 were 19 years old or younger, 55 were ages 20–34, 49 were between the ages of 35 and 49, 55 were between 50 and 64, and the remaining 26 were aged 65 and above. The median age was 36.2 years.

The racial makeup of the CDP was 81.9% White, 1.5% American Indian, 1.5% Black or African American, 1.2% Asian, 13.5% Other, and 0.4% two or more races. 27% of the population were Hispanic or Latino of any race.

There were 89 households in the CDP, 66 family households (74.2%) and 23 non-family households (25.8%), with an average household size of 2.91. Of the family households, 44 were married couples living together, while there were 6 single fathers and 16 single mothers; the non-family households included 16 adults living alone: eight male and eight female.

The CDP contained 100 housing units, of which 89 were occupied and 11 were vacant.

== Education ==
It is in the Marana Unified School District.
