= Kleindale, Arizona =

CDP in Pima County, Arizona

- Census-designated place
- Location within Arizona Location within the United States
- Coordinates: 32°16′1″N 110°54′45″W
- Country: United States
- State: Arizona
- County: Pima

Area
  - Total: 0.14 sq mi (0.36 km^{2})
  - Land: 0.14 sq mi (0.36 km^{2})
  - Water: 0 sq mi (0.00 km^{2})
- Elevation: 2,400 ft (730 m)

Population (2020)
  - Total: 165
  - Density: 1,186.8/sq mi (458.24/km^{2})
- Time zone: UTC-7 (MST)
- ZIP Code: 85716 (Tucson)
- FIPS code: 04-38290
- GNIS feature ID: 2805218

Kleindale is a census-designated place (CDP) in Pima County, Arizona, United States. It is bordered to the south, east, and west by the city of Tucson and to the north, across the Rillito River, by unincorporated Catalina Foothills. Kleindale was first listed as a CDP prior to the 2020 census.

== Demographics ==
Historical population
Census	Pop.	Note	%±
2020	165		—
U.S. Decennial Census

== Education ==
It is in the Tucson Unified School District.
