= Continental Elementary School District =

School district in Arizona, United States

Address
- 1991 East Whitehouse Canyon Road Green Valley, Arizona, 85614; United States

District information
- Type: Public
- Grades: PreK–8
- NCES District ID: 0402250

Students and staff
- Students: 620
- Teachers: 36.0
- Staff: 43.06
- Student–teacher ratio: 17.22

Other information
- Website: www.continentalesd.org

Continental Elementary School District 39 is a school district in Pima County, Arizona founded in 1916. The school District was named after the Continental Rubber Company.

Originally established with the purpose of being a community of Homeowner Organizations (HOA) in the 1960s, Continental now withstands a community of over about 21,000 people serving about 200 families.

Continental obtained an "A" letter grade about a few years ago after the state AASA assessment.
