= Topawa, Arizona =

Unincorporated community in the state of Arizona, United States

Topawa, Arizona O'odham: Ḍo Bawui
- Census-designated place
- Location of Topawa in Pima County, Arizona.

- Location within Arizona Location within the United States
- Coordinates: 31°48′50″N 111°49′32″W
- Country: United States
- State: Arizona
- County: Pima
- Tribe: Tohono O'odham Nation

Area
  - Total: 5.15 sq mi (13.34 km^{2})
  - Land: 5.15 sq mi (13.34 km^{2})
  - Water: 0 sq mi (0.00 km^{2})
- Elevation: 2,467 ft (752 m)

Population (2020)
  - Total: 233
  - Density: 45.2/sq mi (17.47/km^{2})
- Time zone: UTC-7 (Mountain (MST))
- ZIP code: 85639
- Area code: 520
- GNIS feature ID: 12621

Topawa (O'odham: name Ḍo Bawui translates as "Gathering Tepary Beans") is a census-designated place and unincorporated community in Pima County, Arizona, United States. The population was 315 as of the 2020 census. Topawa is located on the Tohono O'odham Nation reservation, 7.5 miles (12.1 km) south-southeast of Sells. Topawa has a post office with ZIP code 85639.

== Demographics ==
At the 2020 census there were 315 people, 101 households, and 70 families living in the CDP. The population density was 61 people per square mile. There were 140 housing units.

The median household income was $23,929. The per capita income for the CDP was $12,559.

Historical population
Census	Pop.	Note	%±
2020	233		—
U.S. Decennial Census

== Geography ==
Baboquivari Unified School District, which covers the CDP, operates Baboquivari Middle & High School just outside Topawa CDP.

Within the community is also located the San Solano Missions, the parish houses Catholic priests who serve the reservation.

Less than two miles from Topawa, the Tohono O'odham Nation also operates their Himdag Ki: Cultural Center and Museum.
