= Kohatk, Arizona =

CDP in Pinal County, Arizona

Kohatk, Arizona O'odham: Kohadk
- CDP
- Location of Kohatk in Pinal County, Arizona.

- Location in the United States
- Coordinates: 32°34′42″N 112°00′11″W
- Country: United States
- State: Arizona
- County: Pinal

Area
  - Total: 0.097 sq mi (0.25 km^{2})
  - Land: 0.097 sq mi (0.25 km^{2})
  - Water: 0 sq mi (0.00 km^{2})

Population (2020)
  - Total: 37
  - Density: 377.2/sq mi (145.64/km^{2})
- Time zone: UTC-7 (MST (no DST))
- FIPS code: 04-38530

Kohatk (O'odham: Kohadk name translates as "Hollow") is a census-designated place (CDP) in Pinal County, Arizona, United States, located in the northern part Tohono O'odham Nation reservation. The population was 31 as of the 2020 census.

== Demographics ==
Historical population
Census	Pop.	Note	%±
2000	37		—
2010	27		−27.0%
2020	31		14.8%
U.S. Decennial Census

As of the census of 2020, there were 31 people, 8 households, 6 families living in the CDP. The population density was 316 people per square mile. The racial makeup of the CDP was 93% Native American and 7% from two or more races. 7% of the population were Hispanic or Latino of any race.

== Education ==
It is within the Stanfield Elementary School District and the Casa Grande Union High School District.
