= Rillito, Arizona =

CDP in Pima County Arizona

Coordinates: 32°24′53″N 111°09′22″W

Rillito is a census-designated place (CDP) in Pima County, Arizona, United States, surrounded by the town of Marana. The largest business in the community is Arizona Portland Cement and the community has had a post office since the 1920s. There is a regional park and recreation center (Rillito Vista Community Center) in the middle of the community. Rillito has the ZIP Code of 85654; in 2000, the population of the 85654 ZIP Code Tabulation Area was 148.

== Education ==
The entire CDP is served by Marana High School and Marana Middle School. For elementary education, the portion of Rillito lying north of Avra Valley Road is served by Marjorie W. Estes Elementary School and the portion south of Avra Valley Road by the elementary division of Twin Peaks K-8 School. All of these schools are part of the Marana Unified School District.

== Public safety ==
For fire protection and emergency medical services, certain portions of the CDP are served by the Picture Rocks Fire & Medical District while other parts of served by the Northwest Fire District. Law enforcement services are provided by the Pima County Sheriff's Department's Tucson Mountain District, with the portion of Rillito lying north of Avra Valley Road served by Beat 1 and the portion lying south of Avra Valley Road served by Beat 2.

== See also ==
- List of census-designated places in Arizona
