= Tucson Estates, Arizona =

- CDP
- Location in Pima County and the state of Arizona

- Location in the United States
- Coordinates: 32°10′51″N 111°6′35″W
- Country: United States
- State: Arizona
- County: Pima

Area
  - Total: 12.73 sq mi (32.96 km^{2})
  - Land: 12.73 sq mi (32.96 km^{2})
  - Water: 0 sq mi (0.00 km^{2})
- Elevation: 2,648 ft (807 m)

Population (2020)
  - Total: 12,069
  - Density: 948/sq mi (366.2/km^{2})
- Time zone: UTC-7 (MST (no DST))
- FIPS code: 04-77035
- GNIS feature ID: 0025245

Tucson Estates is a census-designated place (CDP) in Pima County, Arizona, United States. The population was 9,755 at the 2000 census.

== Geography ==
Tucson Estates is located at 32°10′51″N 111°6′35″W (32.180867, -111.109661).

According to the United States Census Bureau, the CDP has a total area of 35.1 square miles (90.9 km^{2}), all land.

The census area is made up of several housing developments. The primary ones are

- Tucson Estates Property Owners Association
- Tucson Estates II (Sometimes called the Foothills)
- Other, smaller housing communities

== Demographics ==
Historical population
Census	Pop.	Note	%±
1980	2,814		—
1990	2,662		−5.4%
2000	9,755		266.5%
2010	12,192		25.0%
2020	12,069		−1.0%

=== 2020 census ===
As of the 2020 census, Tucson Estates had a population of 12,069. The median age was 58.1 years. 14.8% of residents were under the age of 18 and 37.9% of residents were 65 years of age or older. For every 100 females there were 96.7 males, and for every 100 females age 18 and over there were 94.6 males age 18 and over.

88.0% of residents lived in urban areas, while 12.0% lived in rural areas.

There were 5,414 households in Tucson Estates, of which 15.5% had children under the age of 18 living in them. Of all households, 48.0% were married-couple households, 20.3% were households with a male householder and no spouse or partner present, and 25.8% were households with a female householder and no spouse or partner present. About 32.5% of all households were made up of individuals and 22.0% had someone living alone who was 65 years of age or older.

There were 6,473 housing units, of which 16.4% were vacant. The homeowner vacancy rate was 1.2% and the rental vacancy rate was 18.7%.

Racial composition as of the 2020 census
Race	Number	Percent
White	7,995	66.2%
Black or African American	174	1.4%
American Indian and Alaska Native	313	2.6%
Asian	112	0.9%
Native Hawaiian and Other Pacific Islander	5	0.0%
Some other race	1,555	12.9%
Two or more races	1,915	15.9%
Hispanic or Latino (of any race)	4,357	36.1%

=== 2000 census ===
At the 2000 census there were 9,755 people, 4,222 households, and 2,883 families living in the CDP. The population density was 278.0 inhabitants per square mile (107.3/km^{2}). There were 4,891 housing units at an average density of 139.4 per square mile (53.8/km^{2}). The racial makeup of the CDP was 83.8% White, 0.7% Black or African American, 1.7% Native American, 0.3% Asian, <0.1% Pacific Islander, 11.5% from other races, and 2.0% from two or more races. 23.7% of the population were Hispanic or Latino of any race.

Of the 4,222 households 19.2% had children under the age of 18 living with them, 57.2% were married couples living together, 7.4% had a female householder with no husband present, and 31.7% were non-families. 27.1% of households were one person and 15.8% were one person aged 65 or older. The average household size was 2.31 and the average family size was 2.77.

The age distribution was 19.4% under the age of 18, 5.0% from 18 to 24, 20.1% from 25 to 44, 25.5% from 45 to 64, and 30.0% 65 or older. The median age was 50 years. For every 100 females, there were 91.5 males. For every 100 females age 18 and over, there were 90.5 males.

The median household income was $36,183 and the median family income was $40,212. Males had a median income of $30,833 versus $24,071 for females. The per capita income for the CDP was $18,771. About 6.2% of families and 7.7% of the population were below the poverty line, including 10.6% of those under age 18 and 5.9% of those age 65 or over.

== Education ==
Most of the CDP is in the Tucson Unified School District. Portions extend into Marana Unified School District and Altar Valley Elementary School District.
