= North Komelik, Arizona =

- Populated place
- Location within the state of Arizona North Komelik (the United States)
- Coordinates: 32°30′28″N 111°56′47″W
- Country: United States
- State: Arizona
- County: Pinal
- Elevation: 1,610 ft (490 m)
- Time zone: UTC-7 (Mountain (MST))
  - Summer (DST): UTC-7 (MST)
- Area code: 520
- FIPS code: 04-50035
- GNIS feature ID: 24290

North Komelik, also historically known as Gu Komelik, Komalik, Komelih, Komlih, and Kukomalik, is a populated place situated in Pinal County, Arizona, United States. The Board on Geographic Names originally designated the official name as Gu Komelik in 1947, before a final decision was made in 1978, changing the official name to the current North Komelik. It has an estimated elevation of 1,608 feet (490 m) above sea level.
