= Tucson Mountains, Arizona =

CDP in Pima County, Arizona

- Census-designated place
- Location within Arizona Location within the United States
- Coordinates: 32°16′32″N 111°3′26″W
- Country: United States
- State: Arizona
- County: Pima

Area
  - Total: 26.32 sq mi (68.17 km^{2})
  - Land: 26.32 sq mi (68.17 km^{2})
  - Water: 0 sq mi (0.00 km^{2})
- Elevation: 2,400 ft (730 m)

Population (2020)
  - Total: 10,862
  - Density: 412.7/sq mi (159.33/km^{2})
- Time zone: UTC-7 (MST)
- ZIP Code: 85745 (Tucson)
- FIPS code: 04-77179
- GNIS feature ID: 2805232

Tucson Mountains is a census-designated place (CDP) in Pima County, Arizona, United States. It is bordered to the east by the city of Tucson and to the west by the Tucson Mountains, including part of Saguaro National Park. It was first listed as a CDP prior to the 2020 census.

== Demographics ==
Historical population
Census	Pop.	Note	%±
2020	10,862		—
U.S. Decennial Census

=== 2020 census ===
As of the 2020 census, Tucson Mountains had a population of 10,862. The median age was 56.5 years. 14.4% of residents were under the age of 18 and 32.1% of residents were 65 years of age or older. For every 100 females there were 98.4 males, and for every 100 females age 18 and over there were 98.2 males age 18 and over.

74.6% of residents lived in urban areas, while 25.4% lived in rural areas.

There were 4,551 households in Tucson Mountains, of which 19.4% had children under the age of 18 living in them. Of all households, 62.9% were married-couple households, 14.3% were households with a male householder and no spouse or partner present, and 16.0% were households with a female householder and no spouse or partner present. About 20.4% of all households were made up of individuals and 10.9% had someone living alone who was 65 years of age or older.

There were 4,860 housing units, of which 6.4% were vacant. The homeowner vacancy rate was 1.0% and the rental vacancy rate was 5.2%.

Racial composition as of the 2020 census
Race	Number	Percent
White	7,723	71.1%
Black or African American	176	1.6%
American Indian and Alaska Native	136	1.3%
Asian	265	2.4%
Native Hawaiian and Other Pacific Islander	8	0.1%
Some other race	605	5.6%
Two or more races	1,949	17.9%
Hispanic or Latino (of any race)	2,906	26.8%

== Education ==
Much of the CDP is in the Tucson Unified School District, while portions are in Marana Unified School District, and Flowing Wells Unified School District.
