= South Komelik, Arizona =

CDP in Pima County, Arizona

- CDP
- Location of South Komelik in Pima County, Arizona.

- Location in the United States
- Coordinates: 31°42′52″N 111°46′26″W
- Country: United States
- State: Arizona
- County: Pima

Area
  - Total: 3.90 sq mi (10.10 km^{2})
  - Land: 3.90 sq mi (10.10 km^{2})
  - Water: 0 sq mi (0.00 km^{2})

Population (2020)
  - Total: 176
  - Density: 45.1/sq mi (17.42/km^{2})
- Time zone: UTC-7 (MST (no DST))
- ZIP code: 85634
- Area code: 520
- FIPS code: 04-68670

South Komelik (O'odham) name translates as "South Flat", is a census-designated place in Pima County, in the U.S. state of Arizona. The population was 117 as of the 2020 census. It is located in the southern part of the Tohono O'odham Nation reservation near the border with Mexico.

== Demographics ==
At the 2020 census there were 117 people, 39 households, and 27 families living in the CDP. The population density was 30 people per square mile. There were 68 housing units.

The median household income was $23,620. The per capita income for the CDP was $12,561.

Historical population
Census	Pop.	Note	%±
2020	176		—
U.S. Decennial Census
