= Pima County, Arizona =

County in Arizona, United States

- County
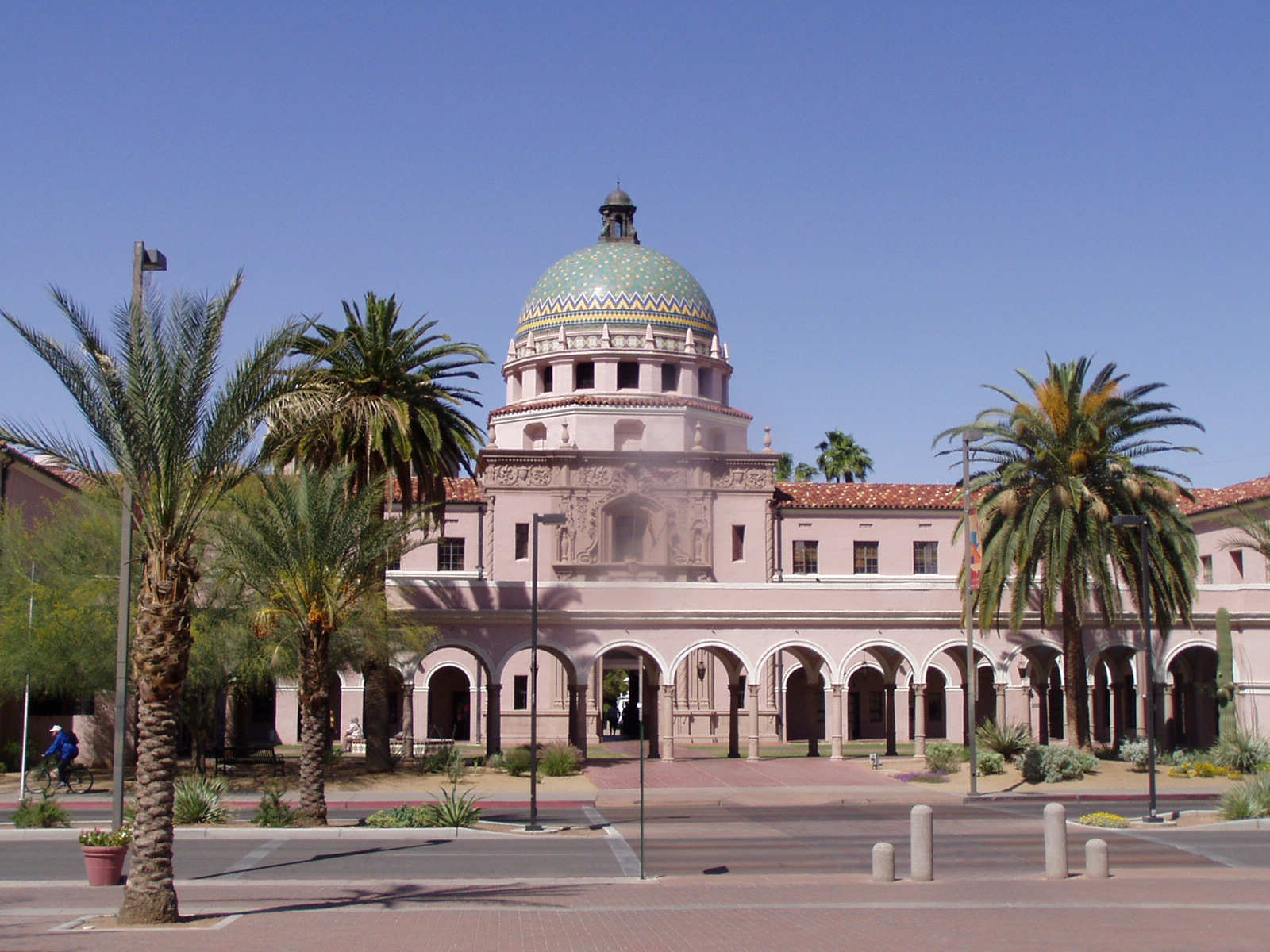
- Pima County Courthouse

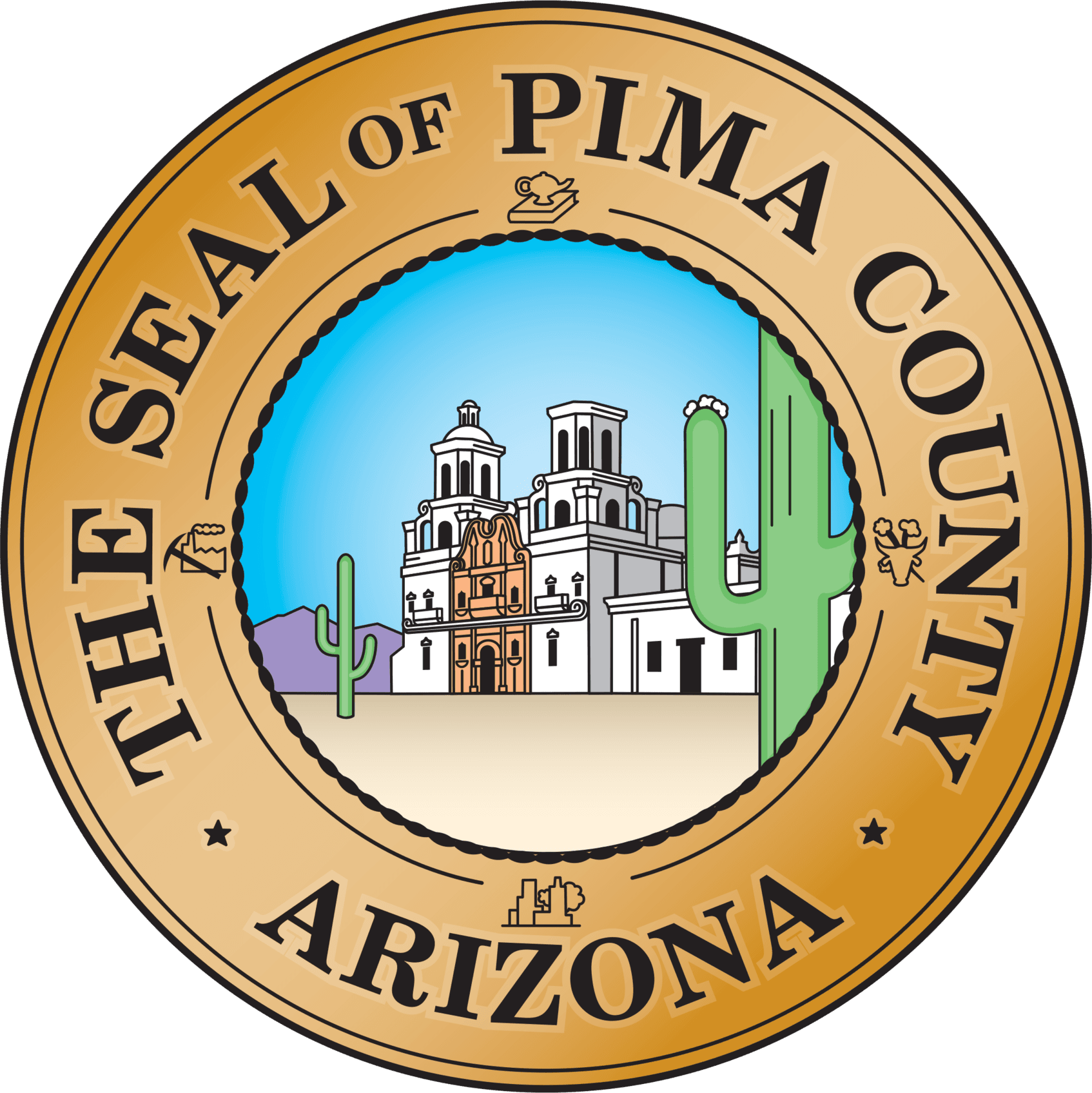
- Seal Logo

- Location within the U.S. state of Arizona
- Coordinates: 32°03′55″N 111°49′15″W
- Country: United States
- State: Arizona
- Founded: November 9, 1864
- Named for: Pima people
- Seat: Tucson
- Largest city: Tucson

Area
  - Total: 9,189 sq mi (23,800 km^{2})
  - Land: 9,187 sq mi (23,790 km^{2})
  - Water: 2.1 sq mi (5.4 km^{2}) 0.02%

Population (2020)
  - Total: 1,043,433
  - Estimate (2025): 1,074,685 ▲
  - Density: 113.6/sq mi (43.85/km^{2})
- Time zone: UTC−7 (Mountain)
- Congressional districts: 6th, 7th
- Website: www.pima.gov

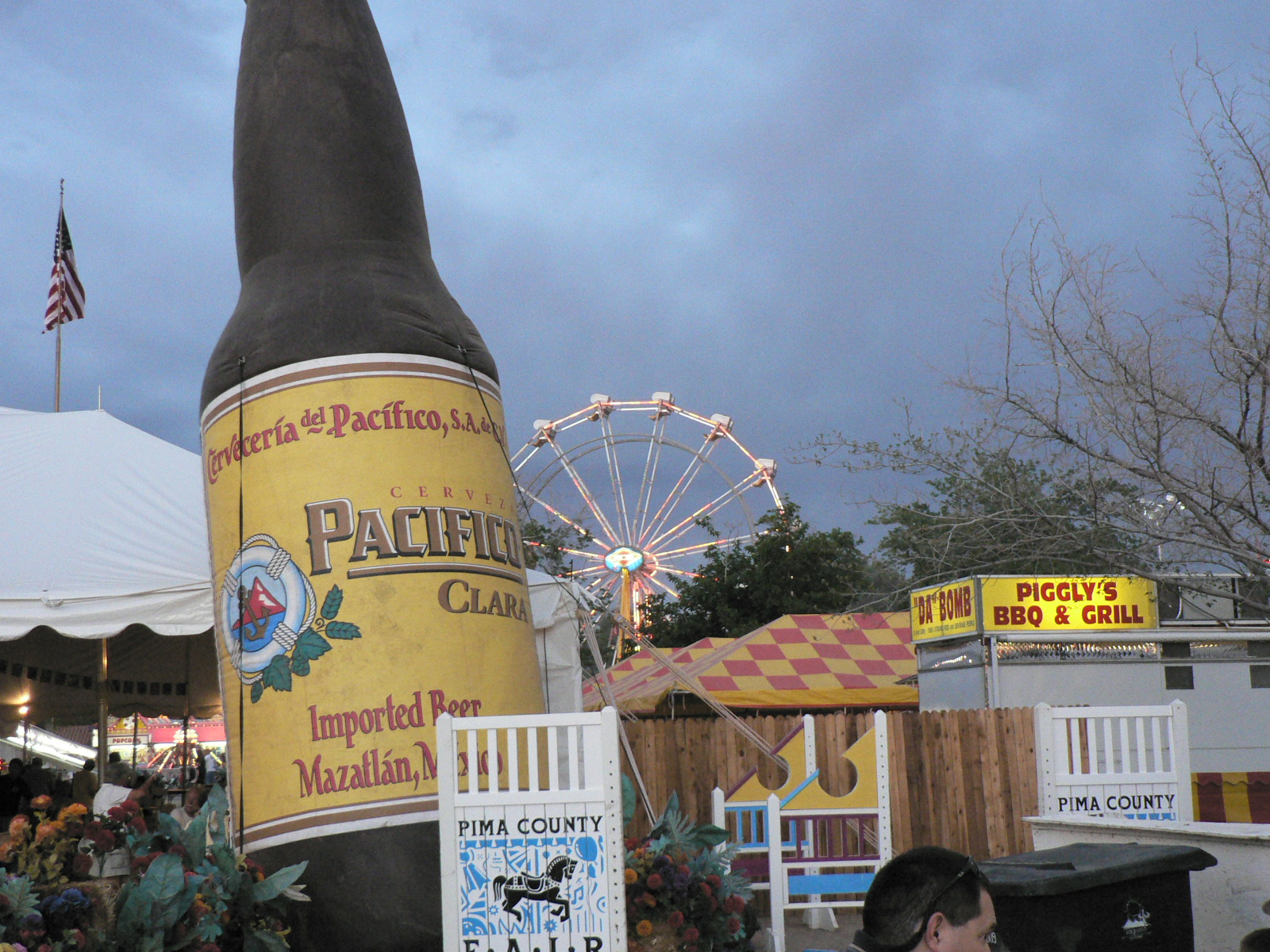
Pima County Fair, 2007

Pima County (/ˈpiːmə/ PEE-mə) is a county in the south central region of the U.S. state of Arizona, one of 15 counties in the state. As of the 2020 census, the population was 1,043,433, making it Arizona's second-most populous county. The county seat is Tucson, where most of the population is centered. The county is named after the Pima Native Americans, also known as Akimel O'odham, who are indigenous to this area.

Pima County includes the entirety of the Tucson Metropolitan Statistical Area, and it is the third largest metropolitan area in the Southwestern United States.

Pima County contains parts of the Tohono O'odham Nation, as well as all of the San Xavier Indian Reservation, the Pascua Yaqui Indian Reservation, Organ Pipe Cactus National Monument, Ironwood Forest National Monument and Saguaro National Park.

The vast majority of the county population lies in and around the city of Tucson, filling much of the eastern part of the county with urban development. As Arizona's second-largest city, Tucson is a major commercial and academic center. Other urban areas include the Tucson suburbs of Marana, Oro Valley, Sahuarita, South Tucson, and Green Valley. The rest of the county is sparsely populated; the largest towns are Sells, the capital of the Tohono O'odham Nation, and Ajo in the county's far western region.

== History ==
Pima County, one of the four original counties in Arizona, was created by the 1st Arizona Territorial Legislature with land acquired through the Gadsden Purchase from Mexico in 1853. The original county consisted of all of Arizona Territory east of longitude 113° 20' and south of the Gila River. Soon thereafter, the counties of Cochise, Graham and Santa Cruz were carved from the original Pima County.

== Geography ==
According to the United States Census Bureau, the county has a total area of 9,189 square miles (23,800 km^{2}), of which 9,187 square miles (23,790 km^{2}) is land and 2.1 square miles (5.4 km^{2}) (0.02%) is water.

=== Topographic features ===
- Mountains of Pima County
- Fresnal Canyon

=== Major highways ===
- Interstate 10
- Interstate 19
- Historic U.S. Route 80
- State Route 77
- State Route 83
- State Route 85
- State Route 86
- State Route 210
- State Route 286
- State Route 989

=== Adjacent counties and municipalities ===
- Yuma County – west
- Maricopa County – north
- Pinal County – north
- Graham County – northeast
- Cochise County – east
- Santa Cruz County – southeast east and south
- Altar, Sonora, Mexico – south
- Caborca, Sonora, Mexico – south
- General Plutarco Elías Calles, Sonora, Mexico – south
- Sáric, Sonora, Mexico – south

=== National protected areas ===
- Buenos Aires National Wildlife Refuge
- Cabeza Prieta National Wildlife Refuge (part)
- Coronado National Forest (part)
- Ironwood Forest National Monument (part)
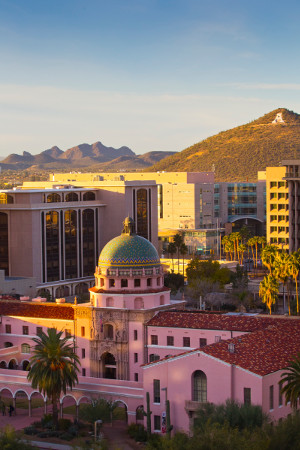
- Old Pima County Courthouse
  Las Cienegas National Conservation Area (part)
- Organ Pipe Cactus National Monument
- Saguaro National Park

=== Sonoran Desert Conservation Plan ===
The Sonoran Desert Conservation Plan (SDCP) is Pima County's plan for desert conservation. The SDCP addresses natural and cultural resources, ranches, endangered species compliance and wildlife corridors.

== Demographics ==
Historical population
Census	Pop.	Note	%±
1870	5,716		—
1880	17,006		197.5%
1890	12,673		−25.5%
1900	14,689		15.9%
1910	22,818		55.3%
1920	34,680		52.0%
1930	55,676		60.5%
1940	72,838		30.8%
1950	141,216		93.9%
1960	265,660		88.1%
1970	351,667		32.4%
1980	531,443		51.1%
1990	666,880		25.5%
2000	843,746		26.5%
2010	980,263		16.2%
2020	1,043,433		6.4%
2025 (est.)	1,074,685	▲	3.0%
U.S. Decennial Census; 1790–1960 1900–1990; 1990–2000 2010–2020

=== Racial and ethnic composition ===
Pima County, Arizona – Racial and ethnic composition Note: the US Census treats Hispanic/Latino as an ethnic category. This table excludes Latinos from the racial categories and assigns them to a separate category. Hispanics/Latinos may be of any race.
Race / Ethnicity (NH = Non-Hispanic)	2020	2010	2000	1990	1980
White alone (NH)	51.5% (536,868)	55.3% (541,700)	61.5% (518,720)	68.2% (454,919)	72.9% (387,592)
Black alone (NH)	3.5% (36,254)	3.2% (31,075)	2.9% (24,047)	2.9% (19,455)	2.6% (14,072)
American Indian alone (NH)	2.3% (23,670)	2.4% (23,558)	2.6% (21,821)	2.5% (17,005)	2.4% (12,642)
Asian alone (NH)	2.9% (29,844)	2.5% (24,592)	2% (16,595)	1.7% (11,228)	0.9% (4,896)
Pacific Islander alone (NH)	0.2% (1,937)	0.1% (1,336)	0.1% (891)		
Other race alone (NH)	0.5% (4,657)	0.2% (1,461)	0.1% (1,012)	0.2% (1,011)	0.2% (863)
Multiracial (NH)	3.6% (37,415)	1.8% (17,739)	1.6% (13,082)	—	—
Hispanic/Latino (any race)	35.7% (372,788)	34.6% (338,802)	29.3% (247,578)	24.5% (163,262)	21% (111,378)

=== American Community Survey 2025 data ===
The United States Census Bureau estimated that in 2025, Pima County’s population was 1.074.685. It was also estimated that the county's population was 49,76% Non-Hispanic White, 37,32% Hispanic or Latino, 3,80% Non-Hispanic Black, 3,41% Asian, 2,33% Native American, 0,20% Pacific Islander, and 3,19% Multiracial.

Total	Population	Percentage
Non-Hispanic White	534.710	49,76%
Hispanic or Latino	401.082	37,32%
Non-Hispanic Black	40.885	3,80%
Asian	36.606	3,41%
Native American	25.007	2,33%
Pacific Islander	2.114	0,20%
Non-Hispanic Multiracial	34.281	3,19%

=== 2020 census ===
As of the 2020 census, the county had a population of 1,043,433. Of the residents, 20.0% were under the age of 18 and 21.9% were 65 years of age or older; the median age was 41.2 years. For every 100 females there were 96.6 males, and for every 100 females age 18 and over there were 94.8 males. 91.2% of residents lived in urban areas and 8.8% lived in rural areas.

The racial makeup of the county was 60.7% White, 3.8% Black or African American, 3.3% American Indian and Alaska Native, 3.0% Asian, 0.2% Native Hawaiian and Pacific Islander, 12.2% from some other race, and 16.7% from two or more races. Hispanic or Latino residents of any race comprised 35.7% of the population.

There were 427,021 households in the county, of which 25.5% had children under the age of 18 living with them and 28.6% had a female householder with no spouse or partner present. About 31.1% of all households were made up of individuals and 13.6% had someone living alone who was 65 years of age or older.

There were 470,132 housing units, of which 9.2% were vacant. Among occupied housing units, 63.6% were owner-occupied and 36.4% were renter-occupied. The homeowner vacancy rate was 1.7% and the rental vacancy rate was 7.7%.

=== 2010 census ===
As of the census of 2010, there were 980,263 people, 388,660 households, and 243,167 families living in the county. The population density was 106.7 inhabitants per square mile (41.2 inhabitants/km^{2}). There were 440,909 housing units at an average density of 48.0 units per square mile (18.5 units/km^{2}). The racial makeup of the county was 74.3% white, 3.5% black or African American, 3.3% American Indian, 2.6% Asian, 0.2% Pacific islander, 12.3% from other races, and 3.7% from two or more races. Those of Hispanic or Latino origin made up 34.6% of the population.

The largest ancestry groups were:

- 30.8% Mexican
- 16.2% German
- 10.6% Irish
- 9.9% English
- 4.5% Italian
- 3.1% French
- 2.8% American
- 2.7% Polish
- 2.4% Scottish
- 1.8% Scotch-Irish
- 1.7% Norwegian
- 1.6% Dutch
- 1.6% Swedish
- 1.1% Russian

Of the 388,660 households, 29.8% had children under the age of 18 living with them, 44.5% were married couples living together, 12.8% had a female householder with no husband present, 37.4% were non-families, and 29.2% of all households were made up of individuals. The average household size was 2.46 and the average family size was 3.06. The median age was 37.7 years.

The median income for a household in the county was $45,521 and the median income for a family was $57,377. Males had a median income of $42,313 versus $33,487 for females. The per capita income for the county was $25,093. About 11.2% of families and 16.4% of the population were below the poverty line, including 22.6% of those under age 18 and 8.5% of those age 65 or over.

=== 2000 census ===
As of the census of 2000, there were 843,746 people, 332,350 households, and 212,039 families living in the county. The population density was 92 people per square mile (36 people/km^{2}). There were 366,737 housing units at an average density of 40 units per square mile (15 units/km^{2}). The racial makeup of the county was 75.1% White, 3.0% Black or African American, 3.2% Native American, 2.0% Asian, 0.1% Pacific Islander, 13.3% from other races, and 3.2% from two or more races. 29.3% of the population were Hispanic or Latino of any race. 22.8% reported speaking Spanish at home.

There were 332,350 households, out of which 29.2% had children under the age of 18 living with them, 47.7% were married couples living together, 11.8% had a female householder with no husband present, and 36.2% were non-families. 28.5% of all households were made up of individuals, and 9.4% had someone living alone who was 65 years of age or older. The average household size was 2.47 and the average family size was 3.06.

In the county, the population was spread out, with 24.6% under the age of 18, 10.9% from 18 to 24, 28.4% from 25 to 44, 21.9% from 45 to 64, and 14.2% who were 65 years of age or older. The median age was 36 years. For every 100 females there were 95.7 males. For every 100 females age 18 and over, there were 92.7 males.

The median income for a household in the county was $36,758, and the median income for a family was $44,446. Males had a median income of $32,156 versus $24,959 for females. The per capita income for the county was $19,785. About 10.5% of families and 14.7% of the population were below the poverty line, including 19.4% of those under age 18 and 8.2% of those age 65 or over.

== Metropolitan Statistical Area ==
The United States Office of Management and Budget has designated Pima County as the Tucson, AZ Metropolitan Statistical Area. The United States Census Bureau ranked the Tucson, AZ Metropolitan Statistical Area as the 53rd most populous metropolitan statistical area of the United States as of July 1, 2012.

The Office of Management and Budget has further designated the Tucson, AZ Metropolitan Statistical Area as a component of the more extensive Tucson-Nogales, AZ Combined Statistical Area, the 53rd most populous combined statistical area and the 59th most populous primary statistical area of the United States as of July 1, 2012.

== Government, policing, and politics ==
Pima County is governed by a five-member Board of Supervisors who set ordinances and run services for the areas that do not fall within any city or town's jurisdiction.

In Arizona, counties are creatures of the state, and do not have charters of their own. The county Board of Supervisors acts under powers delegated by state law, mainly related to minor ordinances and revenue collection. With few exceptions, these powers are narrowly construed. The state legislature devotes considerable time to local matters, with legislative approval required for many of the most basic local issues.

=== Board of Supervisors and elected positions ===
The Pima County Board of Supervisors is responsible for steering public policy in the region. The five-member board provides direction to the County Administrator, Jan Lesher, and the county's various departments as they work to ensure safe communities, nurture economic development, sustainably manage natural resources and protect public health. In addition to overseeing the delivery of a host of municipal services, from roads to parks and libraries and law enforcement, board members also are responsible for approving the county budget. Elected to four-year terms, board members also set the amount of taxes to be levied.

Party	District	Name	First elected	Area(s) represented	Official Website
Democratic	District 1	Rex Scott	2020	Oro Valley, Marana, Catalina Foothills	District 1
Democratic	District 2	Matt Heinz	2020	Tucson, Sahuarita, South Tucson	District 2
Democratic	District 3	Jennifer Allen	2024	Tucson, Marana, Three Points, Sahuarita	District 3
Republican	District 4	Steve Christy	2016	Tucson, Vail, Summerhaven, Green Valley	District 4
Democratic	District 5	Andrés Cano	2025 (Note: Appointed to replace Adelita Grijalva.)	Tucson, Sahuarita, Green Valley	District 5

Along with the Board of Supervisors the Arizona State Constitution allows for 7 other county elected officials.

Party	Office	Name	First elected	References
Democratic	Assessor	Suzanne Droubie	2020	
Democratic	County Attorney	Laura Conover	2020	
Democratic	County Recorder	Gabriella Cázares-Kelly	2020	
Democratic	County School Superintendent	Dustin Williams	2016	
Democratic	Sheriff	Chris Nanos	2020	
Democratic	Treasurer	Brian Johnson	2024	
Democratic	Clerk of Superior Court	Gary Harrison	2020	

=== Pima County sheriff ===
The Pima County Sheriff's Department provides court protection, administers the county jail, provides coroner service, and patrols the unincorporated parts of Pima County. It is the seventh largest sheriff's department in the nation. Incorporated towns within the county with municipal police departments are Tucson, Marana, Oro Valley, and Sahuarita.

=== Politics ===
Being home to the state's second-largest city and a major research university, Pima County is one of the most reliably Democratic counties in Arizona. After voting Democratic through 1930s and 1940s, it swung Republican following major population increase after World War II, becoming a Republican-leaning county. However, in 1964, it rejected Arizona's native son Barry Goldwater by seven points, who won statewide by one point. However, despite the county's Republican lean, Democrats would not win 40% of the vote only twice - in 1972, when George McGovern lost in a 49-state landslide and due to a balloting error in the county, the Socialist Workers Party came a distant third with 18% of the vote; and in 1980, when Jimmy Carter lost many votes to independent John B. Anderson. Following Bill Clinton's plurality victory by 12 points in 1992, all Democrats since 1996 have won the county by a majority and no Republican has come closer than six points in recapturing the county. In both 2016 and 2020, Donald Trump became the first Republican since Bob Dole in 1996 to fail to win 40% of the county's vote. However, Trump won 41.8% of the county's vote in his third presidential run in 2024.

United States presidential election results for Pima County, Arizona
Year	Republican		Democratic		Third party(ies)	
Year	No.	%	No.	%	No.	%
1912	353	19.57%	693	38.41%	758	42.02%
1916	2,616	53.15%	2,079	42.24%	227	4.61%
1920	3,392	58.01%	2,455	41.99%	0	0.00%
1924	3,559	42.17%	2,594	30.74%	2,286	27.09%
1928	6,635	56.94%	4,976	42.70%	42	0.36%
1932	6,152	34.70%	11,061	62.40%	514	2.90%
1936	6,079	32.70%	12,249	65.89%	262	1.41%
1940	9,445	40.09%	14,035	59.57%	82	0.35%
1944	10,850	45.37%	13,006	54.39%	57	0.24%
1948	16,968	47.63%	17,692	49.66%	965	2.71%
1952	32,113	60.19%	21,237	39.81%	0	0.00%
1956	39,298	62.49%	23,536	37.43%	51	0.08%
1960	46,734	52.43%	42,171	47.31%	239	0.27%
1964	46,955	46.36%	54,120	53.44%	203	0.20%
1968	49,479	50.61%	39,786	40.70%	8,501	8.70%
1972	73,154	45.41%	56,223	34.90%	31,733	19.70%
1976	77,264	49.83%	71,214	45.93%	6,583	4.25%
1980	93,055	49.75%	64,418	34.44%	29,584	15.82%
1984	123,830	56.90%	91,585	42.09%	2,197	1.01%
1988	117,899	50.28%	113,824	48.54%	2,750	1.17%
1992	97,036	34.47%	128,569	45.68%	55,879	19.85%
1996	104,121	39.36%	137,983	52.16%	22,448	8.49%
2000	124,579	43.31%	147,688	51.34%	15,373	5.34%
2004	171,109	46.56%	193,128	52.55%	3,255	0.89%
2008	182,406	46.20%	206,254	52.24%	6,180	1.57%
2012	174,779	45.61%	201,251	52.52%	7,143	1.86%
2016	167,428	39.71%	224,661	53.28%	29,551	7.01%
2020	207,758	39.90%	304,981	58.57%	7,996	1.54%
2024	214,669	41.81%	292,450	56.96%	6,317	1.23%

== Communities ==
Map of the incorporated and unincorporated cities and towns in Pima County. Also shown are the borders for the Indian Reservations in the county.

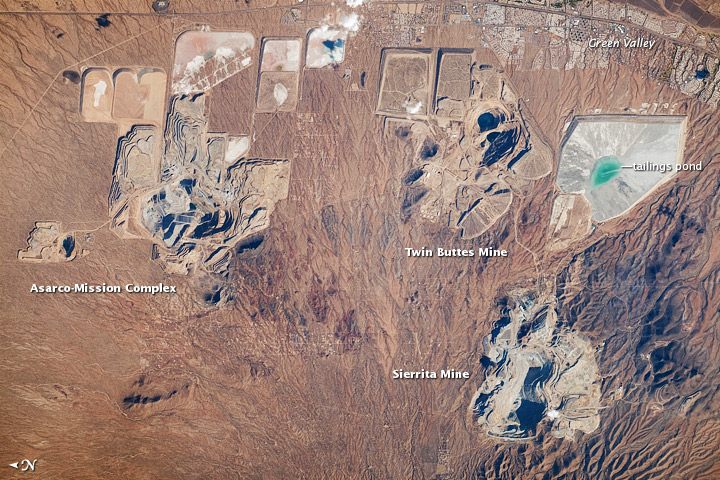
Astronaut photo of the open-pit copper mines adjacent to Green Valley, 2010. North is to the left.

=== Cities ===
- South Tucson
- Tucson (county seat)

=== Towns ===
- Marana (partially in Pinal County)
- Oro Valley
- Sahuarita

=== Census-designated places ===
- Ajo
- Ak Chin
- Ali Chuk
- Ali Chukson
- Ali Molina
- Anegam
- Arivaca
- Arivaca Junction
- Avra Valley
- Casas Adobes
- Catalina
- Catalina Foothills
- Charco
- Chiawuli Tak
- Comobabi
- Corona de Tucson
- Cowlic
- Drexel Heights
- Elephant Head
- Flowing Wells
- Green Valley
- Gu Oidak
- Haivana Nakya
- J-Six Ranchettes
- Kleindale
- Ko Vaya
- Littletown (former)
- Maish Vaya
- Nelson
- Nolic
- Picture Rocks
- Pimaco Two (former)
- Pisinemo
- Rillito
- Rincon Valley
- San Miguel
- Santa Rosa
- Sells
- South Komelik
- Summerhaven
- Summit
- Tanque Verde
- Three Points
- Topawa
- Tucson Estates
- Tucson Mountains
- Vail
- Valencia West
- Ventana
- Wahak Hotrontk
- Why
- Willow Canyon

=== Indian communities ===
- Pascua Yaqui
- San Xavier
- Tohono O'odham (part)

=== Other communities ===
- Drexel-Alvernon
- East Sahuarita
- Kentucky Camp
- Lukeville
- Redington
- Sasabe
- Tortolita

=== Ghost towns ===
- Achi
- Ahan Owuch
- Ak Chut Vaya
- Allen
- Cerro Colorado
- Helvetia
- Hahuul Kawuch Vay, Arizona
- Kentucky
- Pantano
- Redington
- San Rafael
- Total Wreck
- Twin Buttes
- List of ghost towns in Arizona

=== County population ranking ===
The population ranking of the following table is based on the 2020 census of Pima County.

† county seat

Rank	City/Town/etc.	Population (2020 Census)	Municipal type	Incorporated
1	† Tucson	542,629	City	1775
2	Casas Adobes	70,973	CDP	
3	Catalina Foothills	52,401	CDP	
4	Marana	51,908	Town	1977
5	Oro Valley	47,070	Town	1974
6	Sahuarita	34,134	Town	1994
7	Drexel Heights	27,523	CDP	
8	Green Valley	22,616	CDP	
9	Tanque Verde	16,250	CDP	
10	Flowing Wells	15,657	CDP	
11	Valencia West	14,101	CDP	
12	Vail	13,604	CDP	
13	Tucson Estates	12,069	CDP	
14	Tucson Mountains	10,862	CDP	
15	Picture Rocks	9,551	CDP	
16	Corona de Tucson	9,240	CDP	
17	Catalina	7,551	CDP	
18	Rincon Valley	5,612	CDP	
19	Avra Valley	5,569	CDP	
20	Three Points	5,184	CDP	
21	Summit	4,724	CDP	
22	South Tucson	4,613	City	1940
23	Ajo	3,039	CDP	
24	Sells	2,121	CDP	
25	Arivaca Junction	970	CDP	
26	J-Six Ranchettes	647	CDP	
27	Arivaca	623	CDP	
28	Elephant Head	588	CDP	
29	Santa Rosa	474	CDP	
30	Pisinemo	359	CDP	
31	Nelson	249	CDP	
32	Topawa	233	CDP	
33	San Miguel	205	CDP	
34	South Komelik	176	CDP	
35	Kleindale	165	CDP	
36	Anegam	149	CDP	
37	Maish Vaya	129	CDP	
38	Gu Oidak	126	CDP	
39	Why	122	CDP	
40	Ali Chuk	119	CDP	
41	Ali Chukson	113	CDP	
42	Cowlic	105	CDP	
43	Rillito	94	CDP	
44	Wahak Hotrontk	88	CDP	
45	Haivana Nakya	72	CDP	
46	Summerhaven	71	CDP	
47	Ali Molina	61	CDP	
48	Ventana	52	CDP	
49	Ak Chin	50	CDP	
50	Chiawuli Tak	48	CDP	
51	Comobabi	44	CDP	
52	Ko Vaya	43	CDP	
53	Charco	27	CDP	
54	Nolic	12	CDP	
55	Willow Canyon	2	CDP	

== Education ==
School districts with territory in the county, no matter how slight (even if the schools and administration are in other counties), include:

Unified:

- Ajo Unified School District
- Amphitheater Unified School District
- Catalina Foothills Unified School District
- Flowing Wells Unified School District
- Indian Oasis-Baboquivari Unified School District
- Marana Unified School District
- Sahuarita Unified School District
- Sunnyside Unified School District
- Tanque Verde Unified School District
- Tucson Unified School District
- Vail Unified School District

Elementary:

- Altar Valley Elementary School District
- Continental Elementary School District
- Empire Elementary School District
- Redington Elementary School District
- San Fernando Elementary School District

Arizona State Schools for the Deaf and Blind is based in Tucson.

== Tourist attractions ==
=== Annual events ===
- Pima County Fair

Tucson Gem and Mineral Show Tucson Rodeo

=== Locations of interest ===
- Arizona-Sonora Desert Museum
- Old Tucson Studios
- Arizona Historical Society (museum)
- Tucson Gem & Mineral Show
- Titan Missile Museum
- Pima Air & Space Museum
- Mission San Xavier del Bac

== County-Designated Historic Landmarks ==
- Ferguson House, Hacienda Del Bosquito, Desert Treasures, Designated 2018
- Harrenstein House, Designated 2018
- Viewpoint, Christina and Earl J. Johnson House, Designated 2021
- Jacobson House, Designated 2022

== Sister Cities ==
- Kaohsiung, Taiwan

== See also ==
- National Register of Historic Places listings in Pima County, Arizona
- Pima County Sheriff's Department
- John G.F. Speiden - Jay Six Ranch
- Federal Correctional Complex, Tucson
