= Baboquivari Unified School District =

Coordinates: 31.9132°N 111.8819°W

Baboquivari High School

Location
- AZ SR 86 and Indian Route 19; Sells, Arizona 85634; United States

Information
- School type: Public high school
- School district: Baboquivari Unified School District
- Superintendent: Edna Morris, Ed.D
- Grades: 9–12
- Enrollment: 203 students (October 1, 2014)
- Colors: Cobalt blue and gold
- Mascot: Warriors
- Website: www.busd40.org

Baboquivari Unified School District (BUSD) is a school district with its headquarters in Sells, a census-designated place in unincorporated Pima County, Arizona, United States. The school district was known as the Indian Oasis-Baboquivari Unified School District (IOBUSD) until 2012.

== History ==
As of 2014 it had almost 1,100 students. Its starting salary for teachers was $51,000. According to superintendent Edna Morris, some houses had no running water or electricity.

== Schools ==
Schools include:

Traditional:

- Baboquivari Middle & High School (Topawa CDP)
- Indian Oasis Elementary Intermediate School (Sells CDP)
- Indian Oasis Elementary Primary School (Sells CDP)

Alternative secondary:

- Indian Oasis Middle School and High School (Sells CDP) – Alternative school

Previously the school organization was different, with Baboquivari High School in Topawa, Indian Oasis Elementary School in Sells, and Baboquivari Middle School, Indian Oasis Middle School, and Indian Oasis High School sharing the same Sells campus.

== See also ==
- Tohono O'odham High School, Bureau of Indian Affairs-operated high school near Sells
