= Area code 520 =

Area code in southern Arizona, United States

Coordinates: 32°N 111°W

Clickable map of Arizona area codes in blue (and border states) with area code 520 shown in red

Area code 520 is a telephone area code in the North American Numbering Plan (NANP) for the U.S. state of Arizona. The numbering plan area comprises Tucson and most of the southeastern part of the state.

Area code 520 was created in a split of area code 602 on March 19, 1995. Previously, 602 had been the sole area code for the entire state of Arizona since the introduction of area codes in 1947. Arizona's rapid growth in demand for telecommunication services during the second half of the 20th century, and the proliferation of mobile and data communication services in the 1990s required additional numbering resources. The numbering plan area originally comprised all of the state outside the Phoenix metropolitan area, but areas outside of southeastern Arizona were split again in 2001 to form area code 928 in 2001.

== History ==
Area code 602 was the only area code for Arizona from the establishment of a nationwide telephone numbering plan in 1947. By the late 1980s, the state needed a second area code to satisfy population growth and increased demand for telephone numbers. Mountain Bell, the incumbent local exchange carrier in the state, requested a second area code for Arizona in 1988. BellCore, which at the time administered the assignment of area codes, denied Mountain Bell's request and instead placed Arizona into the first phase of interchangeable dialing, in which central office codes with a middle digit of 0 or 1 were made available for use, in 1990. This meant that in-state toll and collect calls would require dialing the area code.

By the early 1990s, Arizona was one of the largest states served by only one area code, and it was apparent that the immediate need for a second area code could no longer be staved off. In advance of the 1995 introduction of interchangeable area codes (area codes with a middle digit not 0 or 1), and in response to continued population growth, Arizona was allocated a second area code, area code 520. The new area code completely surrounded metropolitan Phoenix, which mostly retained 602. 520 was introduced on March 19, 1995. Permissive dialing of 602 continued across Arizona until October 22, 1995. On that date, use of 520 became mandatory for rural Arizona. The new area code became mandatory in Flagstaff, Prescott, and Yuma on June 30, 1996, and in Tucson on December 31, 1996. The freed central office codes in 602 were then used for new telephone numbers in the Phoenix area.

Continued line demand in Arizona outside of metropolitan Phoenix, however, necessitated a second split of 520. In 2000, the Arizona Corporation Commission, which regulates public utilities, began to discuss its options. The telecommunications industry favored a split similar to that eventually adopted but moving Cochise County into the new area code. The eventual split approved by the commission in February 2001 kept Cochise, Pima, Pinal, and Santa Cruz counties in 520 while the new area code, area code 928, was assigned to the remainder of the former 520 area. (Some areas of Pinal County are in 480, while the Gila River Indian Community, which extends into Maricopa County, is in 520.) Permissive dialing of 928 began in July 2001 and ended on January 5, 2002.

Prior to October 2021, area code 520 had telephone numbers assigned for the central office code 988. In 2020, 988 was designated nationwide as a dialing code for the National Suicide Prevention Lifeline, which created a conflict for exchanges that permit seven-digit dialing. This area code was therefore scheduled to transition to ten-digit dialing by October 24, 2021.

== Service area ==
=== Counties ===
- Cochise
- Maricopa
- Pima
- Pinal
- Santa Cruz

=== Municipalities ===
- Ajo
- Amado
- Arivaca
- Arizona City
- Bapchule
- Benson
- Bisbee
- Bowie
- Casa Grande
- Catalina
- Cochise
- Coolidge
- Cortaro
- Douglas
- Dragoon
- Elfrida
- Elgin
- Eloy
- Florence
- Fort Huachuca
- Green Valley
- Hereford
- Huachuca City
- Kearny
- Lukeville
- Mammoth
- Marana
- Maricopa
- McNeal
- Mount Lemmon
- Naco
- Nogales
- Oracle
- Oro Valley
- Patagonia
- Pearce
- Picacho
- Pirtleville
- Pomerene
- Red Rock
- Rillito
- Rio Rico
- Sacaton
- Sahuarita
- Saint David
- San Manuel
- San Simon
- Sasabe
- Sells
- Sierra Vista
- Sonoita
- Stanfield
- Superior
- Tombstone
- Topawa
- Tubac
- Tucson
- Tumacacori
- Vail
- Valley Farms
- Willcox

== See also ==
- List of North American Numbering Plan area codes
- List of Arizona area codes

Arizona area codes: 520, 602/480/623, 928
	North: 602/480/623, 928	
West: 928	520	East: 575
	South: Country code 52 (Mexico)	
New Mexico area codes: 505, 575
