= National Register of Historic Places listings in Organ Pipe Cactus National Monument =

This is a list of the National Register of Historic Places listings in Organ Pipe Cactus National Monument.

This is intended to be a complete list of the properties and districts on the National Register of Historic Places in Organ Pipe Cactus National Monument, Arizona, United States. The locations of National Register properties and districts for which the latitude and longitude coordinates are included below, may be seen in a Google map.

There are eight properties and districts listed on the National Register in the park.

This National Park Service list is complete through NPS recent listings posted May 1, 2026.

== Current listings ==
	Name on the Register	Image	Date listed	Location	City or town	Description
1	Bates Well Ranch	Bates Well Ranch	May 20, 1994 (#94000493)	Eastern side of Bates Well Rd. 32°10′06″N 112°57′01″W	Ajo	
2	Bull Pasture		September 1, 1978 (#78000380)	East of Lukeville in the Organ Pipe Cactus National Monument; 32°00′49″N 112°41′42″W	Lukeville	
3	Dos Lomitas Ranch	Dos Lomitas Ranch	May 6, 1994 (#94000426)	Organ Pipe Cactus National Monument; 31°51′29″N 112°44′25″W	Ajo	
4	Gachado Well and Line Camp	Gachado Well and Line Camp	November 2, 1978 (#78000348)	East of Lukeville in the Organ Pipe Cactus National Monument; 31°52′18″N 112°47′08″W	Lukeville	
5	Growler Mine Area		November 14, 1978 (#78000350)	North of Lukeville; 32°10′10″N 112°58′05″W	Lukeville	
6	I'itoi Mo'o-Montezuma's Head and 'Oks Daha-Old Woman Sitting		May 2, 1994 (#94000399)	Organ Pipe Cactus National Monument; 32°07′02″N 112°42′19″W	Ajo	
7	Milton Mine		September 1, 1978 (#78000351)	Northwest of Lukeville; 31°58′08″N 112°53′20″W	Lukeville	
8	Victoria Mine	Victoria Mine	September 1, 1978 (#78000349)	North of Lukeville; 31°55′46″N 112°50′11″W	Lukeville	

== See also ==
- National Register of Historic Places listings in Pima County, Arizona
- National Register of Historic Places listings in Arizona
