= Mexican Federal Highway 8 =

Highway in Mexico

Federal Highway 8
- Carretera federal 8

Route information
- Maintained by Board of Highways of the State of Sonora
- Length: 103.70 km (64.44 mi)

Major junctions
- West end: Puerto Peñasco, Son.
- SH 3 near Puerto Peñasco; SH 36 in Sonoyta; Fed. 2 in Sonoyta
- East end: SR 85 at the U.S. border in Sonoyta

Location
- Country: Mexico
- State: Sonora

Highway system
- Mexican Federal Highways; List; Autopistas; State Highways in Sonora
← Fed. 5	→ Fed. 9

Federal Highway 8 (Spanish: Carretera Federal 8, Fed. 8) is a free part of the federal highways corridors (Spanish: los corredores carreteros federales) entirely within the state of Sonora. It is connected to the roadway that transitions from the border post at Lukeville, Arizona where it connects with Arizona State Route 85, proceeds south through Puerto Peñasco with Sonoyta, Sonora, and intersects with Fed. 2. It continues through the El Pinacate and Gran Desierto de Altar Biosphere Reserve until ending at Puerto Peñasco, a length of 100 km (62 mi).

== Major intersections ==
The entire route is in Sonora.

Municipality	Location	km	mi	Destinations	Notes
Puerto Peñasco	Puerto Peñasco	0	0.0	1 de Junio	Western terminus
Puerto Peñasco		9.9	6.2	SH 3 – Golfo de Santa Clara, Sahuaro	
General Plutarco Elías Calles	Sonoyta	100	62	Fed. 2 east – Santa Ana, Caborca	West end of Fed. 2 concurrency
General Plutarco Elías Calles	Sonoyta	101	63	Fed. 2 west – San Luis Río Colorado, Mexicali	East end of Fed. 2 concurrency
General Plutarco Elías Calles	Sonoyta	104	65	SR 85 north – Lukeville	Eastern terminus at Mexico-U.S. border proceeding into Pima County, AZ
1.000 mi = 1.609 km; 1.000 km = 0.621 mi: Concurrency terminus
