= Why, Arizona =

Unincorporated community in Pima County, Arizona, United States

- Unincorporated town
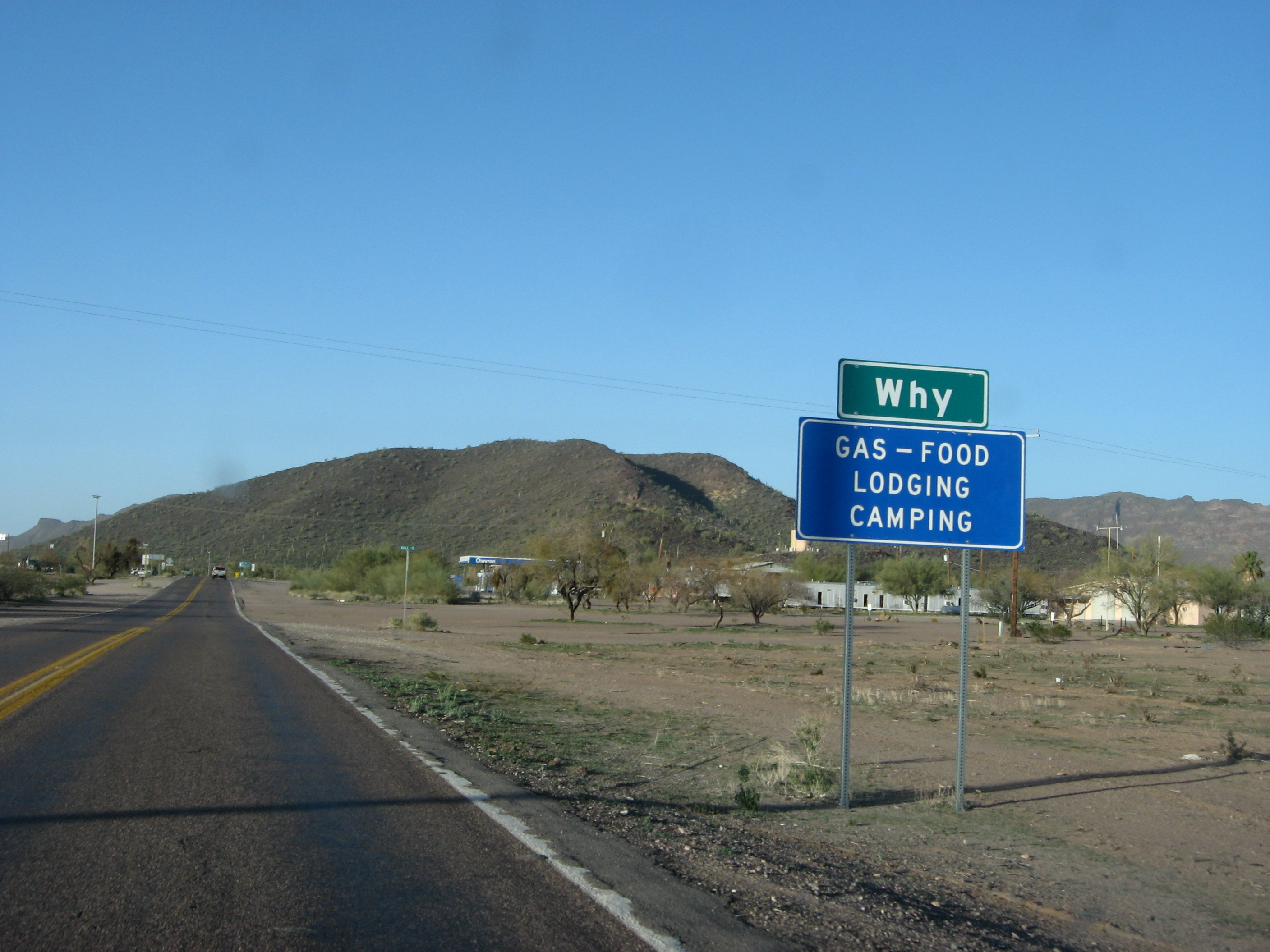
- Why road sign

- Location within the state of Arizona Why (the United States)
- Coordinates: 32°16′4.20″N 112°44′11.99″W
- Country: United States
- State: Arizona
- County: Pima

Population (2020)
  - Total: 122
- Time zone: UTC-7 (Mountain (MST))
  - Summer (DST): UTC-7 (MST)
- ZIP code: 85321
- Area code: 520

Why (Note: O'odham: Ban Hi:nk) is an unincorporated rural community in Pima County, Arizona, United States. It lies near the western border of the Tohono Oʼodham Indian Reservation and due north of Organ Pipe Cactus National Monument in Southern Arizona. It is approximately 30 miles (48 km) north of the Mexican border, where Lukeville, Arizona, and Sonoyta, Sonora, Mexico, border each other, and 10 miles (16 km) south of Ajo, Arizona.

The population of Why at the 2020 census was 122.

== History ==
The town derives its name from the two major highways, State Routes 85 and 86, that once intersected in a Y-intersection. It is rumored that when named, state law required city names to have at least three letters, so the town's founders named the town "Why" as opposed to simply calling it "Y." The Arizona Department of Transportation (ADOT) later eliminated the old Y-intersection for traffic safety and made a conventional intersection south of the original.

The town has frequently been on lists of unusual place names.

== Services ==
Why is not in a school district. The closest district is the Ajo Unified School District.

== Demographics ==
Historical population
Census	Pop.	Note	%±
2000	116		—
2010	167		44.0%
2020	122		−26.9%
U.S. Decennial Census

== Education ==
A portion of Why is in the Indian Oasis-Baboquivari Unified School District, while another is not in any school district. The Pima County School Superintendent arranges for education of K-12 students living in areas without school districts, and that office arranges for transportation to the Ajo Unified School District to the Why areas not in any school district.
