= Lukeville Port of Entry =

Border crossing between Mexico and the U.S.

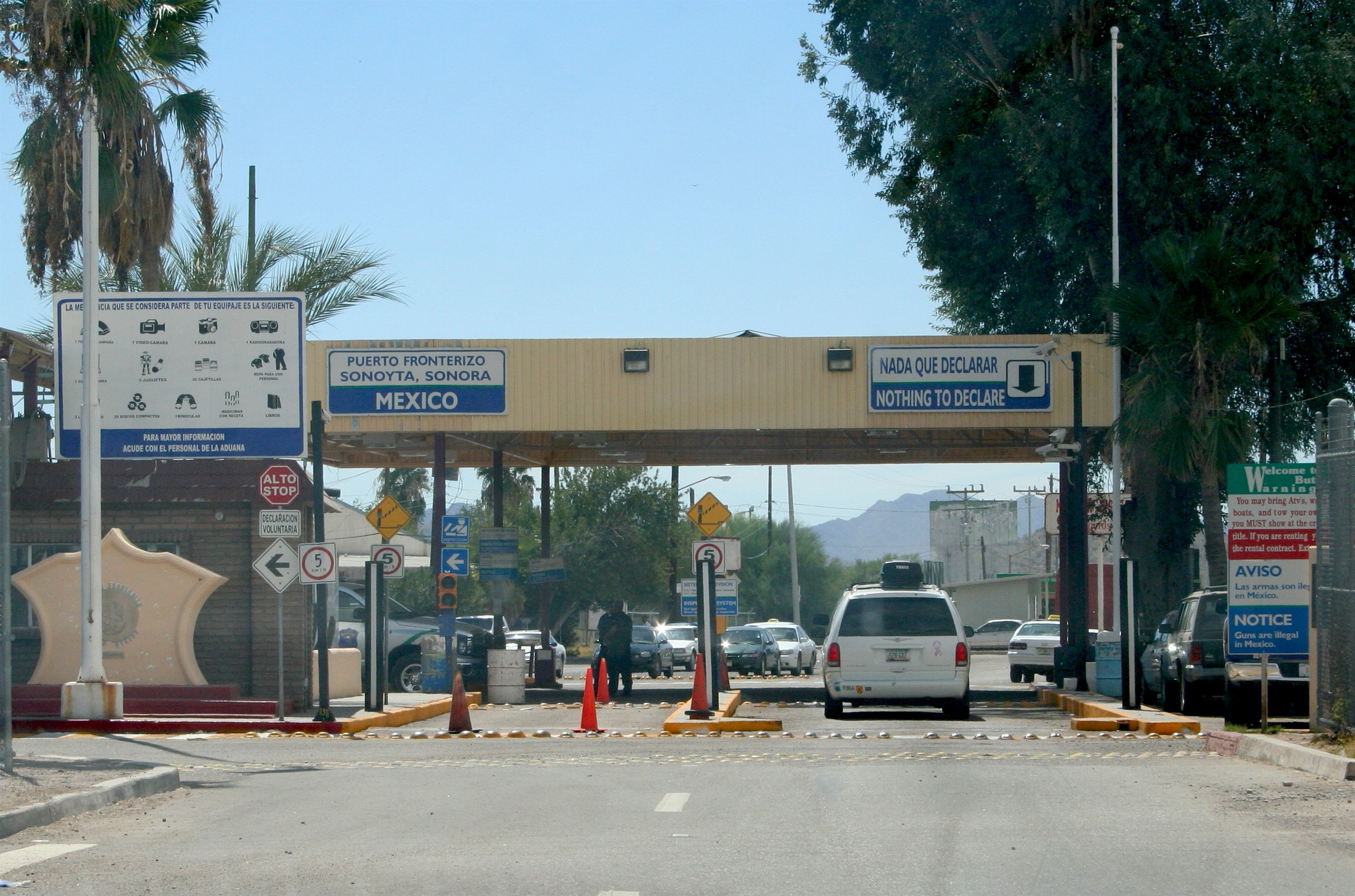
- Looking South from the Lukeville Port of Entry Towards Sonoyta, Sonora, Mexico, September 2005

Location
- Country: United States
- Location: SR 85 / Fed. 8; End of Highway 85, Lukeville, Arizona 85341
- Coordinates: 31.880423°N 112.816919°W

Details
- Opened: 1949

Statistics
- 2011 Cars: 256,238
- 2011 Trucks: 33
- Pedestrians: 41,608

Website
- http://www.cbp.gov/contact/ports/lukeville

The Lukeville, Arizona Port of Entry was established by Executive Order in 1949. It has primarily been a port of entry for passenger vehicles and pedestrians.

It connects Mexican Federal Highway 8 in Sonoyta, Sonora, with Arizona State Route 85, in Lukeville, Arizona. Modifications made using funding from the Federal Highway Administration and Mexican businesses in 2011 facilitate the inspection of trucks and improve general throughput. Much of the traffic using this crossing is people traveling to the popular beach town of Puerto Peñasco, Sonora.

The Lukeville crossing was closed on December 4, 2023, by U.S. Customs and Border Protection. This action was taken to reassign border officers to manage an increase in migrant arrivals. The closure led to devastating consequences for the communities of Lukeville and Sonoyta. The port of entry was reopened on January 4, 2024.

== See also ==
- List of Mexico–United States border crossings
