= Cedo =

Cedo may refer to:

== People ==
- Cedo Simplex or Jon Courtney, British musician
- Čedo Antolić (1951–2019), Croatian spiritual poet and songwriter
- Čedo Grbić (1921–1994), Croatian Serb communist politician
- Čedo Maras (born 1959), Yugoslav football goalkeeper
- Čedo Nikolovski (born 1961), Yugoslav wrestler
- Čedo Vuković (1920–2014), Montenegrin writer

== Other ==
- CEDO, Intercultural Center for the Study of Deserts and Oceans
