= Growler Mine Area =

- U.S. National Register of Historic Places
- Location within Arizona Location within the United States
- Location: Organ Pipe Cactus National Monument
- Nearest city: Ajo, Arizona
- Coordinates: 32°9′53″N 112°58′3″W
- Area: 500 acres (200 hectares)
- Built: late 1880s
- NRHP reference No.: 78000350
- Added to NRHP: November 14, 1978

The Growler Mine Area is a historic mine located in Organ Pipe Cactus National Monument west of the Bates Well Ranch.

== History ==
The Growler mine site "at one time featured a boarding house, three boilers, an Ingersol-Rand air compressor, and two steam hoists." The area was first mined by Frederick Wall who named the mine after John Growler, his friend. The mine reached peak production c. 1916, and ceased in 1917. Attempts to restart production were halted by rising groundwater in the mineshafts, high cost, and the low price of ore. The Growler mine claims yielded "a total of 12,000 pounds of copper, 2 ounces of gold, and 200 ounces of silver with a sum value of $2,000".

Growler had a store and office building, which were in ruins by the 1960s. Around 1928, the ghost town and mine were purchased by Charles Greer and his step-father Bert Long, of Ajo. According to Nell Murbarger, the site quickly became a popular sightseeing destination.

In 1934, visitors reported seeing camels near the old ghost town of Growler. The report was later mentioned in a 1961 issue of Arizona Highways.

Many of the old Growler buildings in the ghost town site were bulldozed in May 1962 by Organ Pipe Cactus National Monument officials for being "dangerous and unsightly". The old Growler town-site was mentioned in a 1969 Phoenix Republic article on scenic drives through the O'Neil Hills area.

The Growler Mine Area in the vicinity of Lukeville, Arizona was listed on the National Register of Historic Places in 1978.

== Rail site ==
A siding (rail) along the Union Pacific Railroad's Roll Industrial Lead, at 32°48′56.16″N 113°47′56.74″W, approximately 30 miles (48 km) northwest is also known as Growler.
