= Arizona State Route 85 =

State highway in Arizona, United States

State Route 85
- SR 85 highlighted in red

Route information
- Maintained by ADOT
- Length: 128.86 mi (207.38 km)
- Existed: 1936–present
- Tourist routes: Organ Pipe Cactus Parkway

Major junctions
- South end: Fed. 8 at the Mexican border at Lukeville
- SR 86 in Why; I-8 in Gila Bend
- North end: I-10 in Buckeye

Location
- Country: United States
- State: Arizona
- Counties: Pima, Maricopa

Highway system
- Arizona State Highway System; Interstate; US; State; Scenic Proposed; Former
← SR 84A	→ SR 86

State Route 85 (SR 85) is a 128.86-mile-long (207.38 km) state highway in the U.S. state of Arizona. The highway runs from the United States–Mexico border near Lukeville to the north ending at Interstate 10 (I-10) in Buckeye. The highway also intersects I-8 in Gila Bend and serves as a connector between I-8 and I-10 and for travelers between Phoenix and Yuma as well as San Diego. SR 85 between I-10 and I-8, as well as I-8 between SR 85 and I-10 in Casa Grande, is touted as a bypass of the Phoenix area for long-distance travelers on I-10.

SR 85 was established in 1936 as a route between Gila Bend and Ajo. It was extended southward to the Mexican border in 1955, and was extended northward to Phoenix when it replaced U.S. Route 80 (US 80) in 1977. The northern end of the highway was realigned in 1994 onto the connecting highway between I-10 and Buckeye. The remaining portion of the highway between Buckeye and Phoenix was gradually turned over to the cities and county along the route during the 1990s, with the final portion turned over in 2001.

== Route description ==
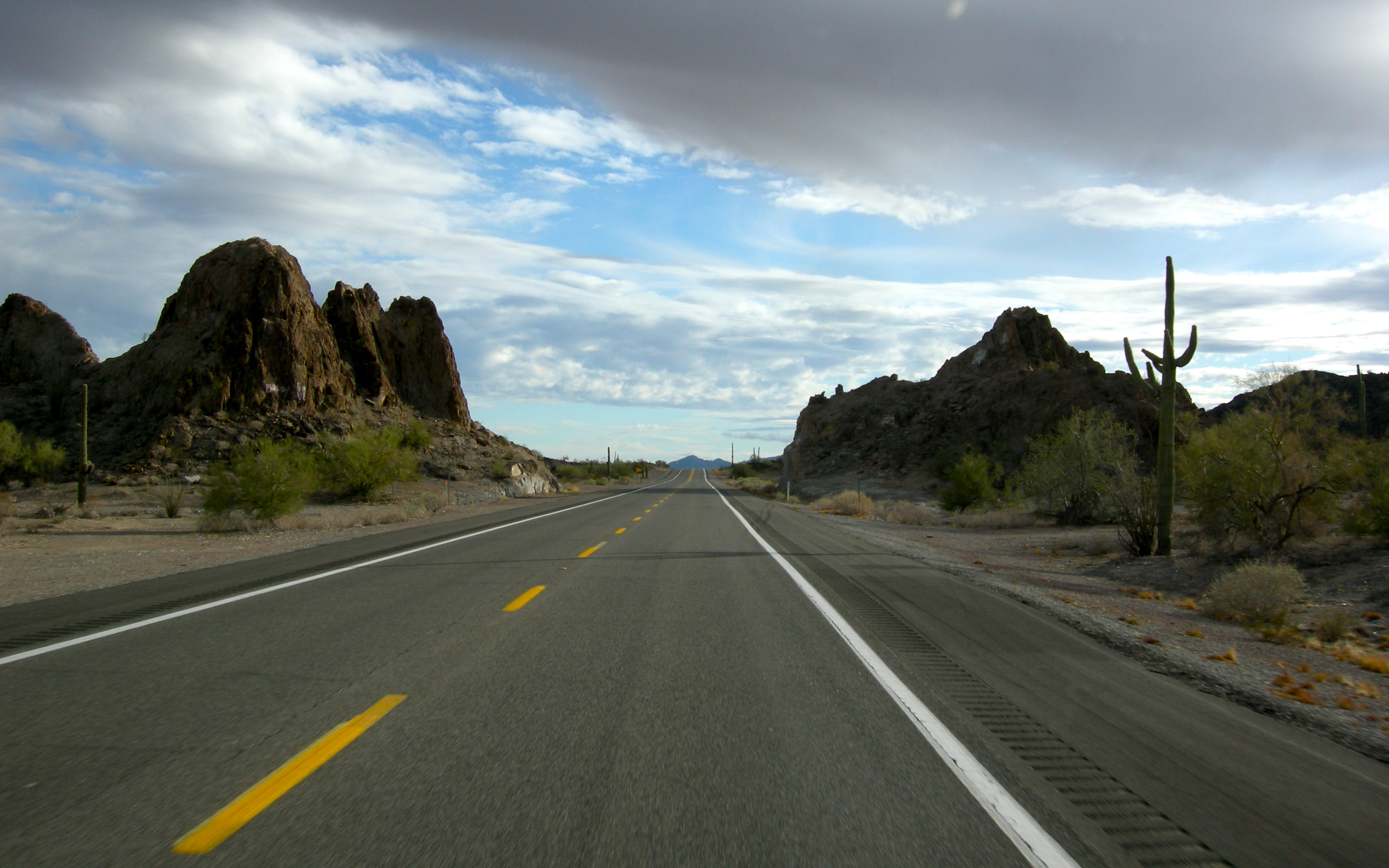
Arizona State Route 85

The southern terminus of SR 85 is located at the Mexican border near Lukeville in Pima County. From Lukeville to Why, SR 85 is designated the Organ Pipe Cactus Parkway by ADOT. The road continues across the border into Mexico to the town of Sonoyta as Mexican Federal Highway 8. SR 85 heads north from the border as a two-lane road, passing through the Organ Pipe Cactus National Monument. The highway leaves the monument boundary and heads to a junction with SR 86 in Why. SR 86 heads east from this junction towards Tucson and southeastern Arizona. SR 85 heads northwest from this junction to the town of Ajo. From Ajo, the highway heads north and enters the Barry M. Goldwater Air Force Range. While within the range, the highway enters Maricopa County. After the highway passes through the range, it continues towards the north to a junction with I-8 in Gila Bend. After passing I-8, the highway intersects the business loop of I-8 and turns towards the east to run concurrently with business loop along Pima Street in Gila Bend. The two highways split, with the business loop heading towards the southeast and SR 85 heading northeast providing access to Gila Bend Municipal Airport

SR 85 continues north from Gila Bend towards the Phoenix Metropolitan Area. The mileposts north of Gila Bend reflect the mileage of old US 80 in proximity to the California state line. This stretch of highway north of Gila Bend is a part of the National Highway System. The highway passes near the western edge of the Sonoran Desert National Monument and also provides access to the Buckeye Hills Regional Park. SR 85 continues northward to a crossing of the Gila River as it nears Buckeye. The highway intersects Buckeye Road which is where the original routing of US 80 and later SR 85 followed into Phoenix before being rerouted onto its current alignment. The highway continues towards the north, crossing over the Buckeye Canal before reaching its northern terminus at exit 112 on I-10.

== History ==
The first numbered highway along the SR 85 corridor was established in 1927 between Gila Bend and Phoenix as US 80. At the time, it was only paved from Phoenix to Hassayampa. Although not paved between Hassayampa and Gila Bend, it was an improved road. This original routing of US 80 still exists as Old US 80 west of the SR 85 alignment. A dirt road between Gila Bend and Ajo did exist at this time, but it was not a part of the state highway system. By 1935, the entire route of US 80 between Gila Bend and Phoenix had been paved. The road south of Gila Bend had also been improved to a gravel road.

In 1936, SR 85 was established, but it only extended as far north as Gila Bend and as far south as Ajo. By 1938, SR 85 had been paved as well as the portion between Ajo and Why that would eventually become part of SR 85. The portion between Why and the border with Mexico began showing up on maps at this time as a gravel road. In 1943, the portion of the highway between Ajo and Why was added to the state highway system, but as SR 86, when it was extended west from Tucson to Ajo. In 1955, the highway was extended to Lukeville at the Mexican border with an overlap with SR 86 between Ajo and Why when a county road was added to SR 85.

In 1973, the connector between I-10 and Buckeye Road was established, and was redesignated in 1978 as a spur route of SR 85. As the old, indirect US 80 was removed from Arizona, SR 85 was extended north in 1977 over the old alignment of US 80 to Buckeye and extended east to Phoenix. Portions of the route in Buckeye and Phoenix were turned over to their respective cities for maintenance in 1990. The following year, a portion of the highway between Avondale and Phoenix was turned over to Maricopa County for maintenance. (This portion is designated today as MC 85). Also in 1991, the overlap between SR 85 and SR 86 was eliminated and the western terminus of SR 86 was changed to its junction with Route 85 in Why. In 1994, the northern end of SR 85 was moved onto the SR 85 Spur that connected to I-10 and the remaining portions along the old alignment to the east were redesignated as a temporary route of SR 85. In 1999, the portion of the old route in Avondale was turned over to the city for maintenance. The portion of the old route around the state capitol complex, the last remaining section of the old route between Phoenix and Buckeye, was turned over to the city of Phoenix in 2001.

== Future ==
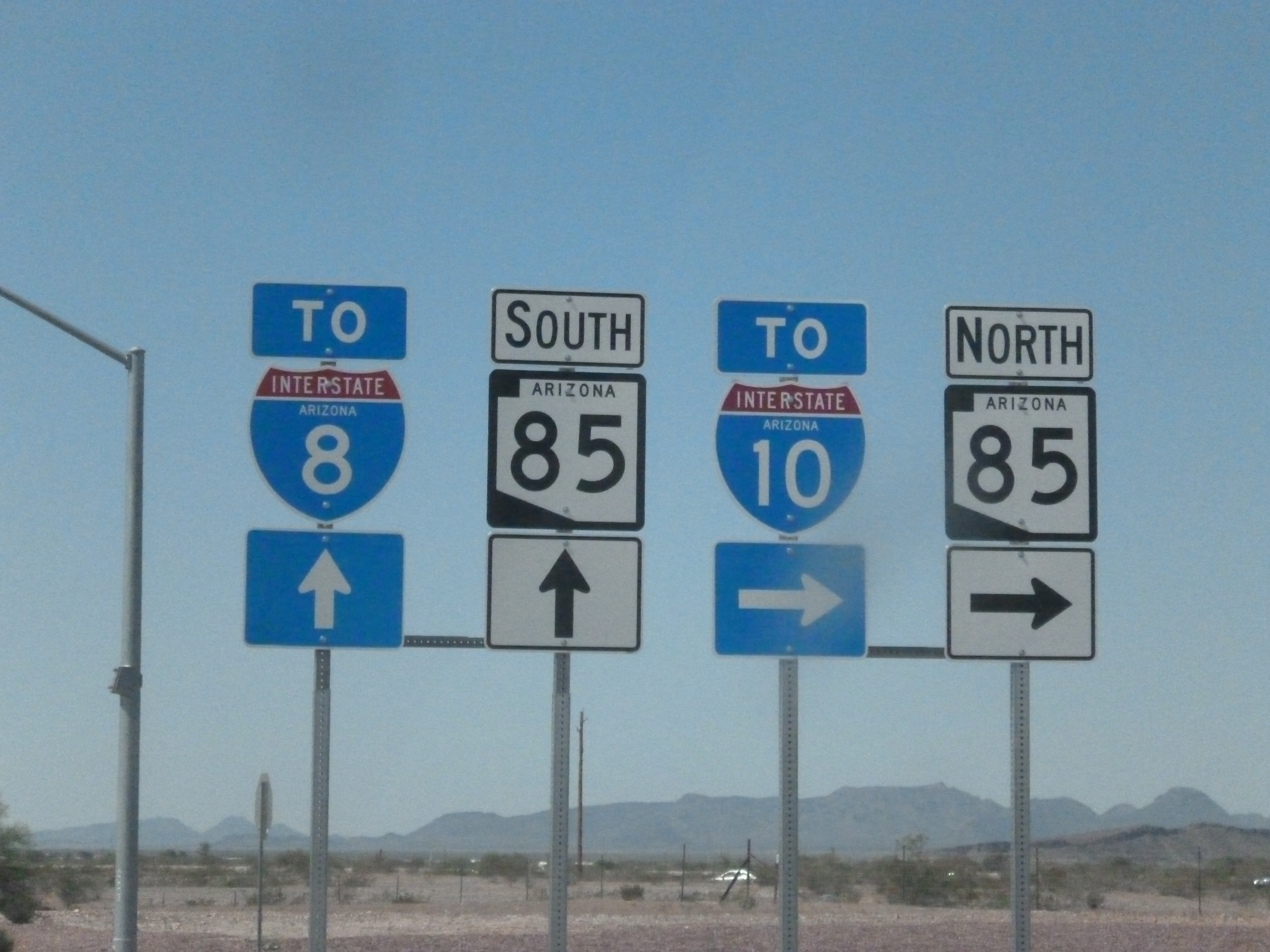
Markers for SR 85 and two Interstates

The segment of SR 85 between Buckeye and Gila Bend is a connector between I-8 and I-10, and serves both as a connector from I-8 from San Diego, California to Phoenix. This segment is being upgraded to a divided highway, and is planned to become a freeway from I-10 to SR-30.

In 2010, an environmental study into building a freeway-to-freeway interchange in Gila Bend from SR 85 to I-8 was completed by ADOT and the Federal Highway Administration. The study found no significant impact (FONSI) on the local environment and outlined a finalized full freeway standard design, bypassing the I-8 Business/Maricopa Road intersection SR 85 currently traverses through. As a part of the Gila Bend Bypass, two diamond interchanges (Maricopa Road and Watermelon Road) are planned to serve the town. Despite the completion of the study, and being acknowledged as a need by ADOT, no progress has been made towards completion of the I-8 Interchange/Gila Bend Bypass Project since the FONSI decision in 2010.

== Major intersections ==
Exit numbers reflect mileposts on former US 80.

County	Location	mi	km	Exit	Destinations	Notes
Pima	Lukeville	0.000	0.000		Fed. 8 south	Lukeville Port of Entry at Mexico–United States border; continuation into Mexico
Pima	Why	27.41	44.11		SR 86 east – Tucson	Western terminus of SR 86
Maricopa	Gila Bend	79.95	128.67		I-8 east – Tucson	Exit 115 on I-8
Maricopa	Gila Bend	80.53	129.60		BL 8 / Historic US 80 west (Pima Street) to I-8 west – San Diego	South end of concurrency with I-8 BL/Historic US 80; former US 80 west
Maricopa	Gila Bend				Historic US 80 east	North end of concurrency with Historic US 80; former US 80 east
Maricopa	Gila Bend	83.20	133.90		BL 8 east (Butterfield Trail) to I-8 east – Tucson	North end of concurrency with I-8 BL
Maricopa	Gila Bend	83.43– 83.95	134.27– 135.10		To SR 238 (Maricopa Road) – Maricopa	access to Sonoran Desert National Monument
Maricopa	Buckeye	101.23	162.91	138	Lewis Prison Road to Patterson Road	Interchange. Access to Arizona State Prison Complex – Lewis
Maricopa	Buckeye	112.36	180.83		Hazen Road (Historic US 80 west) – Palo Verde, Hassayampa, Arlington	South end of Historic US 80 concurrency
Maricopa	Buckeye	113.35	182.42		Historic US 80 east / MC 85 – Buckeye, Phoenix	North end of Historic US 80 concurrency; former US 80 east
Maricopa	Buckeye				SR 30 east (Tres Rios Freeway)	Future interchange
Maricopa	Buckeye	117.87	189.69		I-10 – Phoenix, Los Angeles	Northern terminus; exit 112 on I-10
1.000 mi = 1.609 km; 1.000 km = 0.621 mi: Concurrency terminus; Unopened

=== Planned Gila Bend-Buckeye realignment ===
County	Location	mi	km	Exit	Destinations	Notes
SR 85 continues south
Maricopa	Gila Bend	79.95 115.6	128.67 186.0	115	I-8 west	Mileposts reset to reflect mileage on former US 80; south end of concurrency with I-8; exit 116 on I-8; NB access via Old SR 85 and I-8 BL/Historic US 80 (Pima Street); south end of freeway segment
Maricopa	Gila Bend	118.0	189.9	118	I-8 east	Planned flyover interchange; north end of concurrency with I-8; future exit 118 on I-8
Maricopa	Gila Bend	121.0	194.7	121	To BL 8 / SR 238	Planned interchange
Maricopa		123.0	197.9	123	Watermelon Road	Planned interchange
Maricopa	Buckeye	138.2	222.4	138	Lewis Prison Road to Patterson Road	Interchange
Maricopa	Buckeye	149.0	239.8	149	SR 30 east (Tres Rios Freeway)	Future interchange
Maricopa	Buckeye	150.4	242.0	150	Historic US 80 east / MC 85 – Buckeye, Phoenix	Former US 80 east; future interchange
Maricopa	Buckeye	152.0	244.6	152	Southern Avenue	Future interchange
Maricopa	Buckeye	153.0	246.2	153	Broadway Road	Future interchange
Maricopa	Buckeye	154.0	247.8	154	I-10 – Phoenix, Los Angeles	Northern terminus; exit 112 on I-10
1.000 mi = 1.609 km; 1.000 km = 0.621 mi: Concurrency terminus; Unopened

== Maricopa County Route 85 ==
Maricopa County Route 85
- MC 85
- Location: Buckeye to Tolleson
- Length: 25.9 mi (41.7 km)
- Existed: 1991–present

Maricopa County Route 85 (MC 85) is an unsigned 26-mile (42 km) long road that runs along former SR 85 from Buckeye to Tolleson. A portion of the route extends west beyond old SR 85.

=== Major junctions ===
Location	mi	km	Destinations	Notes
Buckeye	0.00	0.00	Turner Road	Western terminus of MC 85
Buckeye	0.9– 1.0	1.4– 1.6	Historic US 80 west / SR 85 south (Ogelsby Road south) – Gila Bend, Yuma, San Diego SR 85 north (Ogelsby Road north) to I-10 – Los Angeles	West end of Historic US 80 concurrency
Goodyear	14.00– 15.00	22.53– 24.14	SR 303 north	Planned at-grade intersection; future southern terminus of SR 303; construction planned to begin in summer-fall 2025; opening planned in 2028
Tolleson–Phoenix line	25.9	41.7	Historic US 80 east (Buckeye Road) / 75th Avenue	Eastern terminus of MC 85; east end of Historic US 80 concurrency; road continues into Phoenix as Buckeye Road (Historic US 80 east)
1.000 mi = 1.609 km; 1.000 km = 0.621 mi: Concurrency terminus; Unopened

== See also ==
- Roads and freeways in metropolitan Phoenix
