= Alfredo López Aceves =

Mexican politician

Member of the Congress of Sonora from the 2nd district
- In office 2000–2003
- Preceded by: Óscar Federico Palacio Soto
- Succeeded by: José Rodrigo Vélez Acosta

Municipal president of Puerto Peñasco
- In office 1982–1985
- Preceded by: Fernando Pérez Barnett
- Succeeded by: Gerardo Portugal Martínez

Personal details
- Died: 5 January 2024 Hermosillo, Sonora, Mexico
- Citizenship: Mexican
- Party: PRI; PANAL
- Occupation: educator

Alfredo López Aceves (died 5 January 2024) was a Mexican educator and politician who represented the Institutional Revolutionary Party (PRI). He served in the LVI Legislature of the Congress of Sonora from 2000 to 2003.

== Biography ==
López Aceves hailed from Puerto Peñasco, Sonora, and was a noted educator who was nicknamed "Profe Tilico" or simply "Tilico". He served as municipal president of Puerto Peñasco from 1982 to 1985.

In the 2000 state elections, López Aceves won a seat representing the 2nd district in the LVI Legislature of the Congress of Sonora. He secured 48 percent of the vote while his closest opponent, Manuel Flores Díaz of the National Action Party (PAN), received 30 percent. In 2002, López Aceves presided over a special committee formed to investigate the alleged embezzlement of over MXN$9 million by Cristina Carbajal Pack, the former municipal president of Benito Juárez.

López Aceves also served as president of the PRI municipal committee in Puerto Peñasco. Despite being a committed PRI member, he switched to the New Alliance Party (PANAL) during the lead-up to the 2012 election on orders from his party superiors. Within PANAL, López Aceves was the secretary general of the state steering committee for Sonora.

López Aceves, who was remembered as a particularly effective orator, lived in Ciudad Obregón and Hermosillo in his final years; he died on 5 January 2024 in Hermosillo. There is a settlement in Puerto Peñasco Municipality which bears his name.
