= Arizona State Route 86 =

State highway in Arizona, United States

State Route 86
- SR 86 highlighted in red

Route information
- Maintained by ADOT
- Length: 118.10 mi (190.06 km)
- Existed: 1930–present

Major junctions
- West end: SR 85 in Why
- I-19 in Tucson
- East end: 16th Avenue in Tucson

Location
- Country: United States
- State: Arizona

Highway system
- Arizona State Highway System; Interstate; US; State; Scenic Proposed; Former
| ← SR 85 | → SR 87 |

State Route 86 (or SR 86) is a state highway in southern Arizona that stretches from its junction with State Route 85 in Why east to its junction at 16th Avenue east of Interstate 19 in Tucson. It formerly went east to the New Mexico border near Lordsburg, but this eastern segment has been superseded by Interstate 10. SR 86 is the primary east–west highway through the Tohono O'odham Nation.

== Route description ==
The western terminus of SR 86 is located at a junction with SR 85 in Why. From this intersection, the highway heads southeast, but curves towards the east as it enters the Papago Indian Reservation. It continues towards the east passing through the communities of Schuchuli, Gunsight, Wahak Hotrontk, Plato Vaya, and Maish Vaya before curving towards the southeast near Quijotoa. It continues southeast until curves towards the east in Sells. It curves towards the northeast near Ali Chukson and curves back to the east near San Pedro. The highway curves towards the northeast just prior to leaving the reservation. SR 86 curves towards the east as it enters Tucson. In Tucson, the highway continues east past an interchange with I-19 to 16th Avenue, which serves as its eastern terminus.

== History ==
Early highway shield used along SR 86.

SR 86 was originally designated in 1930, between Willcox and Bowie. In 1931, it was extended west to Benson and east to the New Mexico state line, effectively serving as a direct bypass to the US 80 Douglas loop. From 1927 to 1960, the remainder of the bypass between the Arizona border and Road Forks, New Mexico was served by New Mexico State Road 14. SR 86 was further extended through Tucson and the Tohono O'odham Indian Reservation to Ajo in 1943. SR 85 was extended south from Ajo to Lukeville in 1955, establishing a concurrency with SR 86 to Why. In 1970, SR 86 had its eastern end truncated to US 89 (later State Business Route 19) in Tucson after being replaced by I-10 between Tucson and New Mexico. In 1991, the concurrency with SR 85 between Ajo and Why was removed, truncating the western end of SR 86 to Why. In 2003, SR 19 Bus. was removed, truncating the eastern end of SR 86 to 16th Avenue east of I-19.

The Census Designated Place of Why was named after the Y-shaped intersection between SR 85 and SR 86. The intersection has since been rebuilt into a T-shaped intersection.

== Junction list ==
The entire route is in Pima County.

| Location | mi | km | Destinations | Notes |
|---|---|---|---|---|
| Why | 0.00 | 0.00 | SR 85 – Lukeville, Ajo | Western terminus; SR 85 north is former SR 86 west |
| | 81.01 | 130.37 | SR 386 – Kitt Peak | |
| Robles Junction | 97.11 | 156.28 | SR 286 – Sasabe | |
| Tucson | 117.88 | 189.71 | I-19 to I-10 – Nogales, Phoenix, El Paso | I-19 exit 99 |
| Tucson | 118.11 | 190.08 | 16th Avenue | Eastern terminus; road continues as Ajo Way |
1.000 mi = 1.609 km; 1.000 km = 0.621 mi
