= Ejido Valdez =

Ejido Valdez, Sonora
- Community
- Interactive map of Ejido Valdez, Sonora
- Coordinates: 31°42′06″N 112°32′35″W
- Country: Mexico
- State: Sonora
- Municipality: Plutarco Elías Calles
- Founded: In 1980s by Blas Barba

Government
  - Mayor: Raúl Martiniano Contreras García (municipality)
- Elevation: 500 m (1,600 ft)

Population (2005)
  - Total: 115
  - Demonym: Ranchero
- Time zone: UTC-7 (MST)

El Ejido Valdez, is a community land in the Mexican state of Sonora, approximately 25 miles (40 km) east from Sonoyta. It is a section of the municipality of General Plutarco Elías Calles.

== Demographics ==
According to the 2005 Census, the community had a population of 115 inhabitants. 60 inhabitants were male and 55 inhabitants were female.
