= Operation Diablo Express =

North American police action

- Part of the Mexican drug war and the war on drugs
Date	29 January 2016
Location	Sonoyta, Sonora, Mexico; Lukeville, Arizona, USA
Result	US-Mexico victory

Belligerents
Mexico; United States	Sinaloa Cartel

Casualties and losses
None	2 killed 22 arrested

Operation Diablo Express was a cross-border raid launched on 29 January 2016, by a combined force of Mexican and American police to apprehend members of the Sinaloa Cartel in Lukeville, Arizona, and the neighboring border town Sonoyta, in northwestern Sonora.

According to Immigration and Customs Enforcement (ICE) spokeswoman Gillian M. Christensen; the Sinaloa cartel "cell" targeted in Sonoyta and the adjacent Lukeville area were responsible for the "importation of millions of pounds of illegal drugs, including marijuana, heroin, cocaine and methamphetamine" into the United States, as well as the smuggling of "millions of dollars in U.S. currency, along with weapons, into Mexico." Christensen also reported that an ICE unit, Homeland Security Investigations, assisted Mexican police in the operation. The DEA, FBI, Customs and Border Protection and Arizona state and local agencies were also involved in coordinated operations on the Arizona side of the border.

Mexico's National Security commissioner, Renato Sales, issued a statement explaining that the operation was conducted via land and air and that when Federal Police moved in they came under fire from armed men, who were guarding the area. Two of the gunmen were killed in the ensuing gun battle and twenty-two others were taken into police custody.

== See also ==
- Joaquín Guzmán
- Operation Sinaloa
