= Gachado Well and Line Camp =

- U.S. National Register of Historic Places
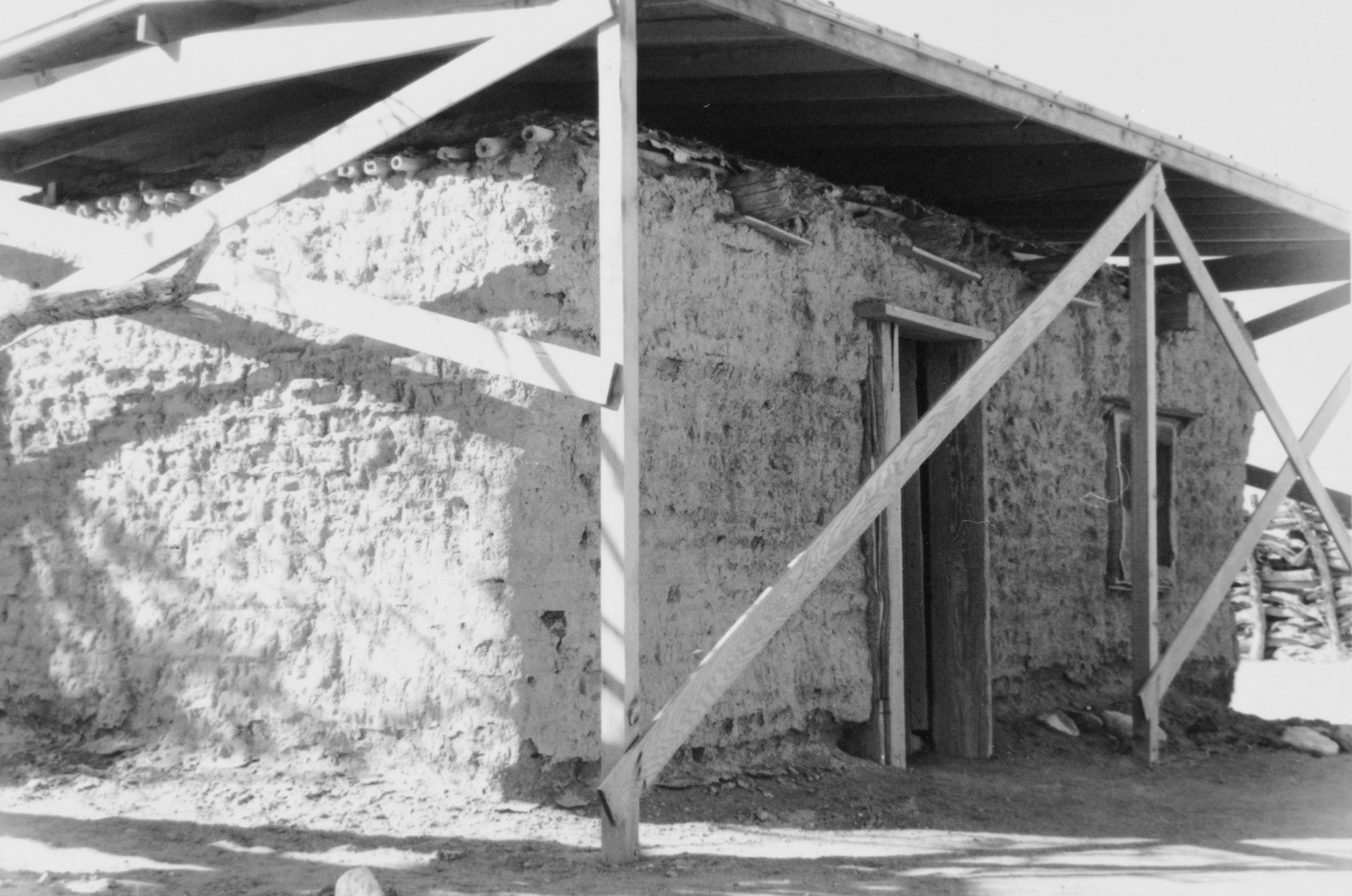
- HABS image of the adobe house

- Location within Arizona Location within the United States
- Nearest city: Lukeville, Arizona
- Coordinates: 31°52′18″N 112°47′8″W
- Area: 2 acres (0.81 ha)
- Built: 1917
- Built by: Lonald Blankenship (well); Robert Louis Gray (house)
- NRHP reference No.: 78000348
- Added to NRHP: November 2, 1978

The Gachado Well was excavated between 1917 and 1919 near the Arizona-Mexico border in Pima County, Arizona. Named after a stooped mesquite tree, the well served a ranch owned by Lonald Blankenship. The line camp and water rights were sold in 1919 to Robert Louis Gray, who built an adobe house at the site in 1930. The house became a line camp, a bunkhouse for cowboys on the range in that area. The camp was used until 1976, when the Grays discontinued ranching. The site is located within Organ Pipe Cactus National Monument. It is accessible via the rough, unpaved Camino de Dos Republicas, which also leads to Dos Lomitas Ranch, another Gray family property.

The site was placed on the National Register of Historic Places on November 2, 1978.

== See also ==
- Bates Well Ranch, another of the Gray family ranches in Organ Pipe Cactus National Monument
