= CEDO =

Mexican ecosystem study center

CEDO is the Intercultural Center for the Study of Deserts and Oceans. The acronym CEDO comes from the Spanish name: Centro Intercultural de Estudios de Desiertos y Océanos.

Located in Puerto Peñasco, Sonora, Mexico, CEDO is a center for the study of the ecosystems of the Sonoran Desert and the Gulf of California.

== History ==
In 1975, CEDO's current Executive Director Peggy Turk Boyer visited Puerto Peñasco with professors John Hendrickson and Don Thomson of the University of Arizona's Ecology and Evolutionary Biology (EEB) Department, as part of the UA's thriving marine biology program. They and their students conducted field activities out of a small beach house beside an experimental shrimp mariculture enterprise which was operated jointly by the UA's Environmental Research Lab (ERL) and the Centro de Investigación en Ciencia y Tecnología of the Universidad de Sonora (CICTUS).

Carl Hodges, ERL's first director and founder of the affiliated nonprofit Desert Development Foundation (DDF), and CICTUS director, Xico Murrieta envisioned a new organization called the Institute for Deserts and Oceans (IDO). It would operate out of a new facility located in the Las Conchas housing development east of the shrimp labs and would be supported with profits from the shrimp mariculture commercial enterprise. Nicholas Yensen was hired as the first director in 1978. After a successful fundraising campaign, Yensen was able to convert the unfinished Las Conchas recreation center and office building into a simple functional biological field station.

== Conservation and research ==
CEDO is a collaboration between Mexican and US non profit organisations and its mission is to advance and share knowledge about the Northern Gulf of California and the surrounding Sonoran Desert. CEDO also promotes the conservation and sustainable use of natural and cultural resources. This includes sustainable fisheries, coastal conservation, wetland research, community education and monthly climatological reports on Puerto Peñasco.

== Awards ==
In 2007, CEDO won Mexico's National Conservation of Nature Award for their 27-year effort to protect the Gulf of California.

CEDO received the 2010 Human Diversity Award from the Organization of Biological Field Stations in Michigan for its achievements in creating collaborative, inclusive systems with local communities and businesses which allowed sustainable fishing and other commercial developments in the Northern Gulf of California.
