= Las Conchas, Mexico =

Coordinates: 31.2892°N 113.4875°W

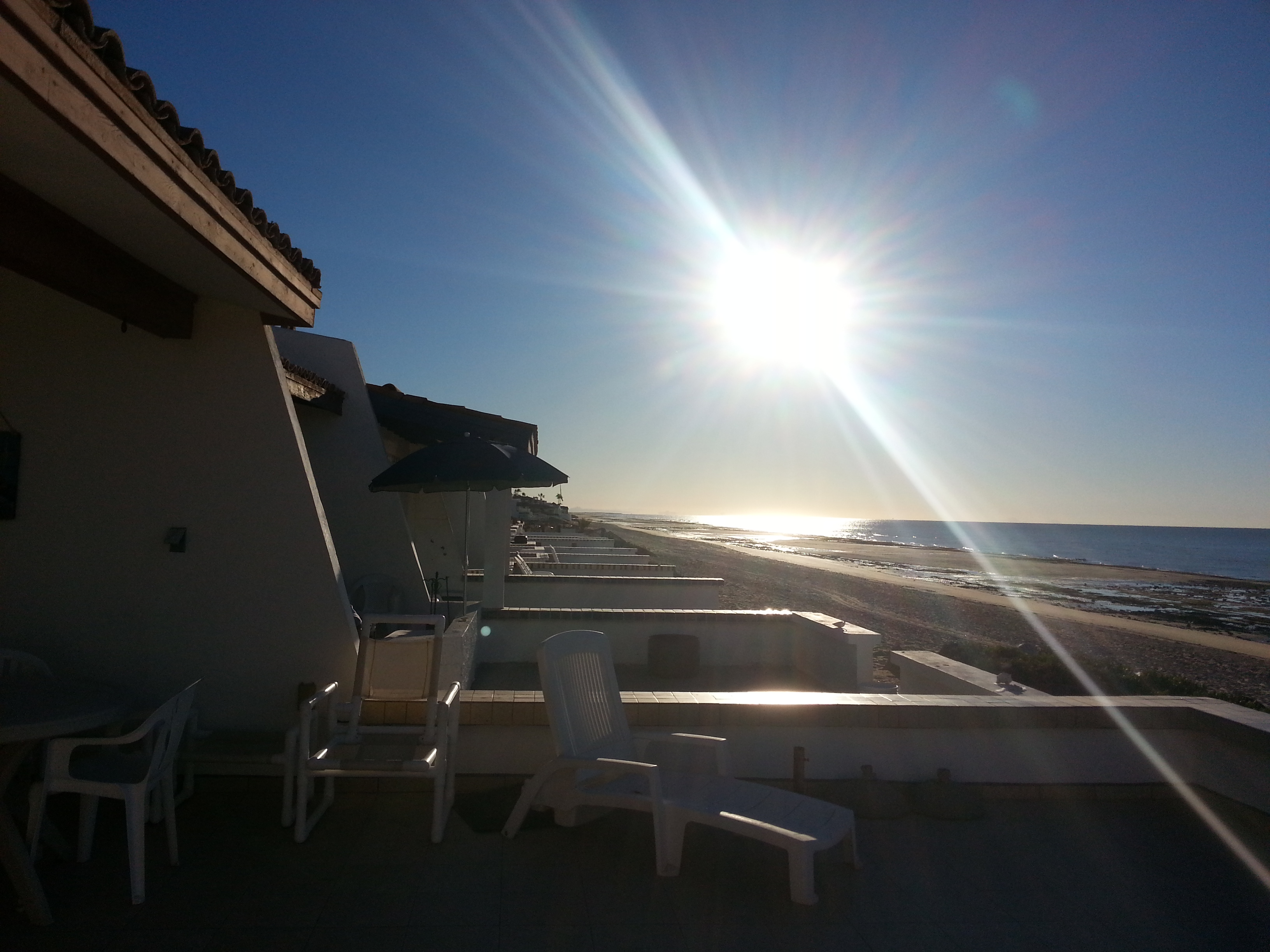
Condominiums in Las Conchas in the early morning sun

Las Conchas is a community in the east of the municipality of Puerto Peñasco in the state of Sonora, Mexico. The area contains mainly homes owned by US citizens who take advantage of the region's proximity to the US border with Arizona.

Directly to the north of Las Conchas is the Morúa Estuary, home to the environmental organisation, CEDO (Centro Intercultural de Estudios de Desiertos y Océanos).
