= General Plutarco Elías Calles Municipality =

General Plutarco Elías Calles
- Municipality
- Coat of arms

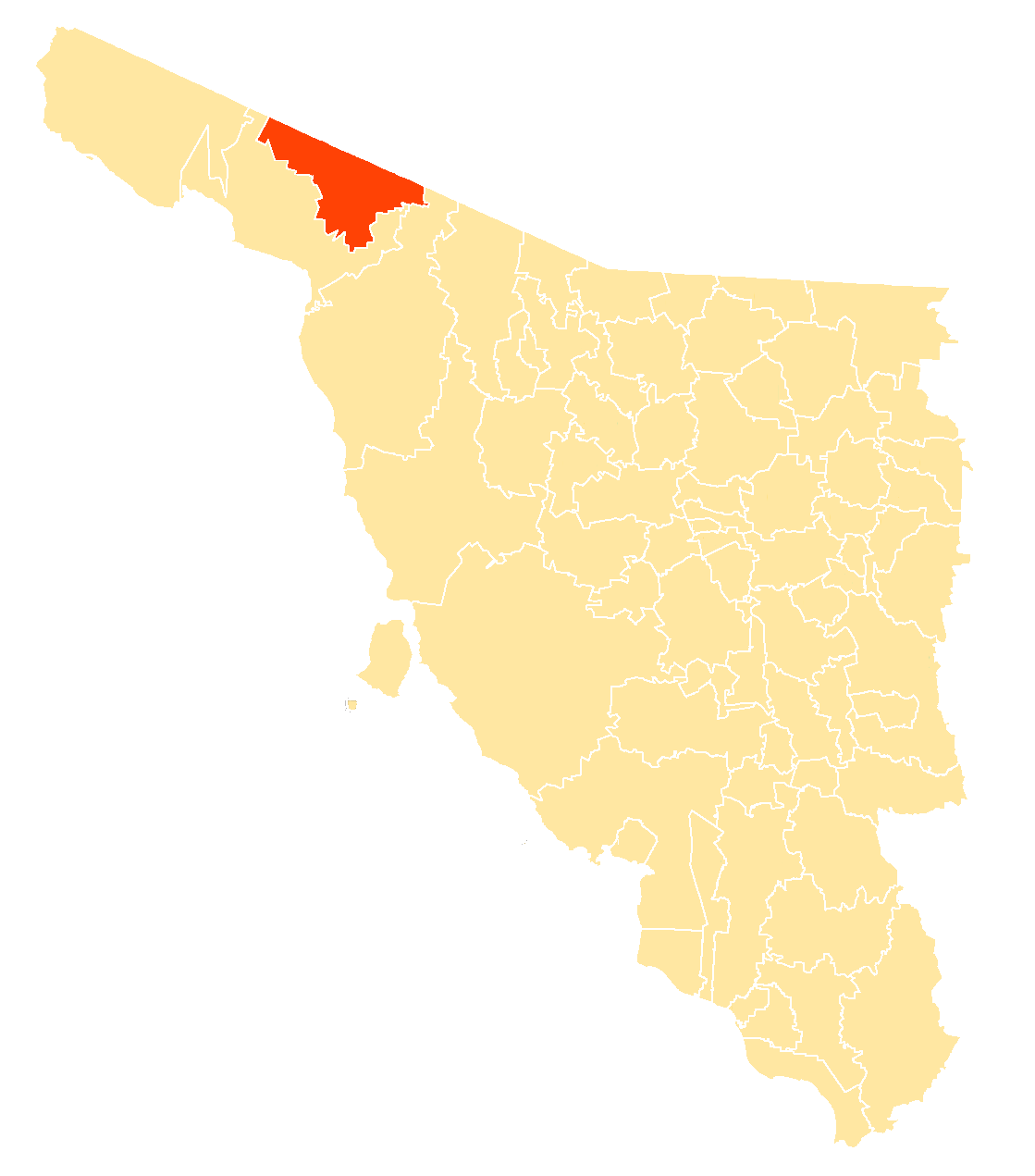

- Location within Mexico
- Coordinates: 31°51′41″N 112°51′16″W
- Country: Mexico
- State: Sonora
- Municipal seat: Sonoyta

Area
  - Total: 4,121.15 km^{2} (1,591.18 sq mi)

Population (2015)
  - Total: 16,931
  - Density: 4.1083/km^{2} (10.640/sq mi)
- Time zone: UTC–07:00 (Zona Pacífico)
- Area code: +52 651
- Sources: Plutarco Elías Calles, Enciclopedia de los Municipios de México; data tables, 2005 census, INEGI.

General Plutarco Elías Calles (named for General Plutarco Elías Calles) is a municipality in the northwest of the Mexican state of Sonora. Its municipal seat and main urban center is Sonoyta, on the United States border opposite Lukeville, Arizona.

== Area and population ==
The municipal area is 4,121.15 km^{2}. The municipal population counted in 2015 was 16,931. The population of Sonoyta, the main settlement and municipal seat was 12,849. It is located at an elevation of 406 meters. Most of the population lives in the north, as the south is an inhospitable desert. The only other locality with a population of over 1,000 inhabitants is called Desierto de Sonora, just east-southeast of Sonoyta. Its population was 1,188 in the 2010 census.

== Neighboring municipalities ==
Neighboring municipalities are Caborca to the east and Puerto Peñasco to the east, south and west. The municipality borders Pima County and Yuma County, Arizona, in the United States of America to the north.

== Geography ==
The north of the municipality is semi-desert with some hills. The south is part of the Gran Desierto de Altar, one of the driest and most inhospitable places in the Western Hemisphere.

== Economy ==
Agriculture is mainly irrigated by pumping from wells. Main crops are garden vegetables, alfalfa, beans, corn, cotton, and the production of fodder for the cattle industry, which is also important.

Industry consists of plants transforming cotton and packing houses for vegetables. There is also a small cheese factory.

== See also ==
- Ejido Valdez, Sonora
