= Dos Lomitas Ranch =

Historic house in Arizona, United States

- U.S. National Register of Historic Places
- U.S. Historic district
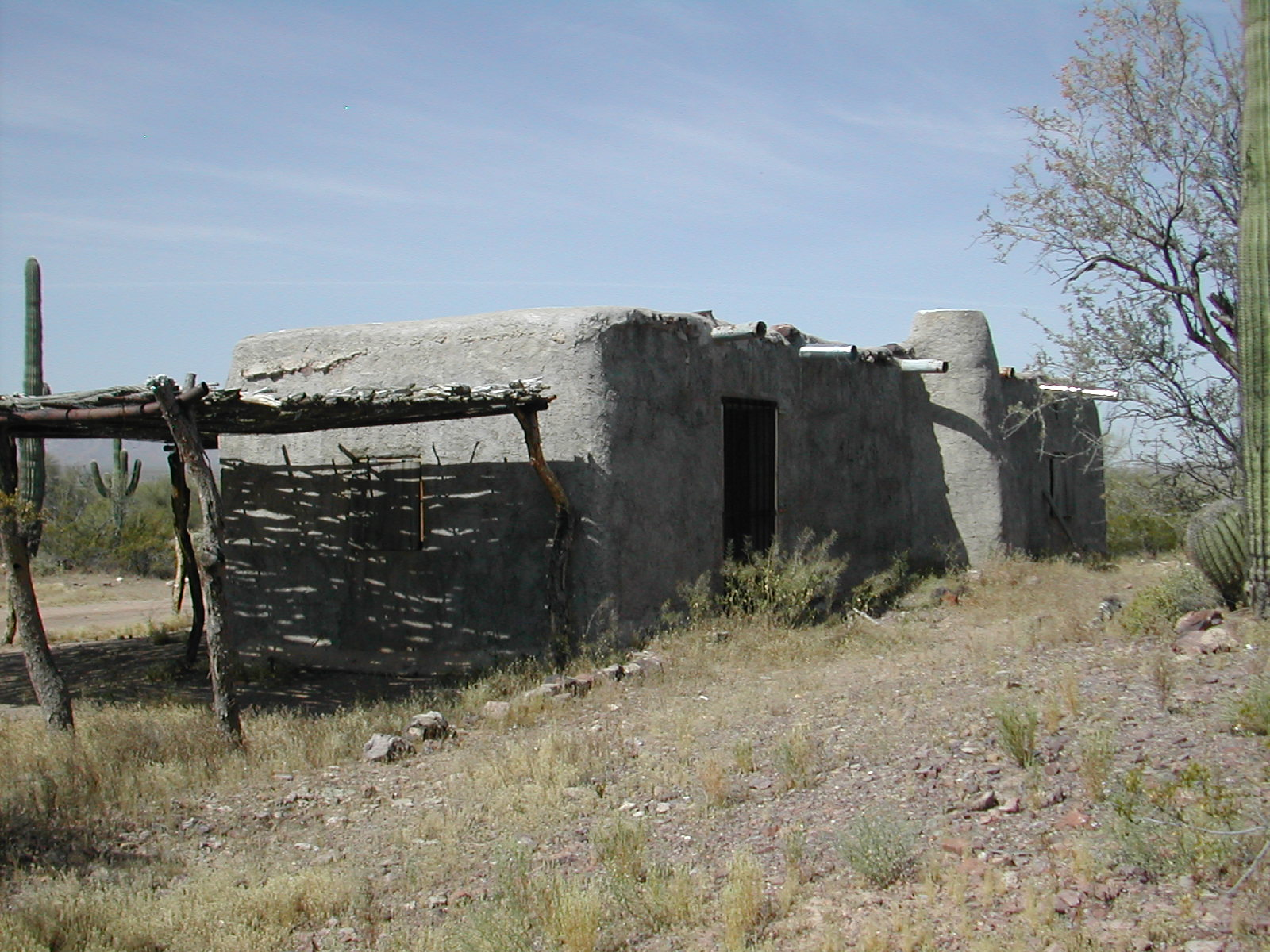
- Dos Lomitas ranch house

- Location within Arizona Location within the United States
- Location: Pima County, Arizona
- Nearest city: Ajo, Arizona
- Coordinates: 31°51′29″N 112°44′25″W
- Built: 1914
- Built by: Robert Louis Gray
- NRHP reference No.: 94000426
- Added to NRHP: May 6, 1994

The Dos Lomitas Ranch, also known as the Rattlesnake Ranch, Blankenship Well and the Gray Ranch, was the first of fifteen ranches and line camps in the Gray family cattle business in the Sonoran Desert country north of the US-Mexico border in Arizona. The ranch is now part of Organ Pipe Cactus National Monument. The period of significance begins for the district with the purchase of the water rights for the ranch in 1919 and ends with the death with the last of the three Gray sons, Robert, Jr., in 1976, and the subsequent removal of the last of the Gray's cattle from the monument.

The main ranch house, is regarded as a rare example of the earlier "Sonoran traditional ranch style," characterized by thick adobe walls, weather exposed or stuccoed, beamed ceiling, flat roof and floor of packed earth, often laid out in an L-form. An outbuilding is built of railroad ties covered with corrugated roofing.

== See also ==
- Bates Well Ranch, another of the Gray family ranches in Organ Pipe Cactus National Monument
- Gachado Well and Line Camp, a Gray family line camp
