= Čedo Antolić =

Croatian poet and songwriter (1951–2019)

Čedo Antolić (January 1, 1951 in Zagreb – August 23, 2019) was a Croatian spiritual poet and songwriter.

== Musical career ==
He became involved with spiritual music in 1974 in the group "Kraljica Apostola" at the Jesuit college at Fratrovac in Zagreb. The group later changed its name to "Kyrios" and in 1979 they appeared at the first Croatian spiritual music festival (Uskrsfest) winning the first prize with Anolić's song "Pjesma svakodnevna". The next year the group published the album "Pjesma svakodnevna" which included six Antolić's songs. The group Kyrios performs until 1988 when Antolić forms "Jutro života" and then joins with the group O. Ante Antić and they perform every Sunday at the church of Gospa Lurdska.

In 1997 he forms a group Stil and the same year publishes the retrospective album "Stvaranje" featuring 21 of his songs written in the period between 1988 and 1997 In 2004 he publishes the album "Jutro". Antolić also works together with the singer Željka Marinović as a composer and songwriter. Her album "Želim ti dati najbolje" won a Porin for spiritual music in 2001.

== Discography ==
- 1980 - Pjesma svakodnevna (Kyrios)
- 1997 - Stvaranje
  - from album "Stvaranje": Božićna popevka
- 2004 - Jutro
  - from album "Jutro": Put med zvezdanim

== Poetry ==
- Pjesnik Gospodnji (2005)
