= Bates Well Ranch =

- U.S. National Register of Historic Places
- U.S. Historic district
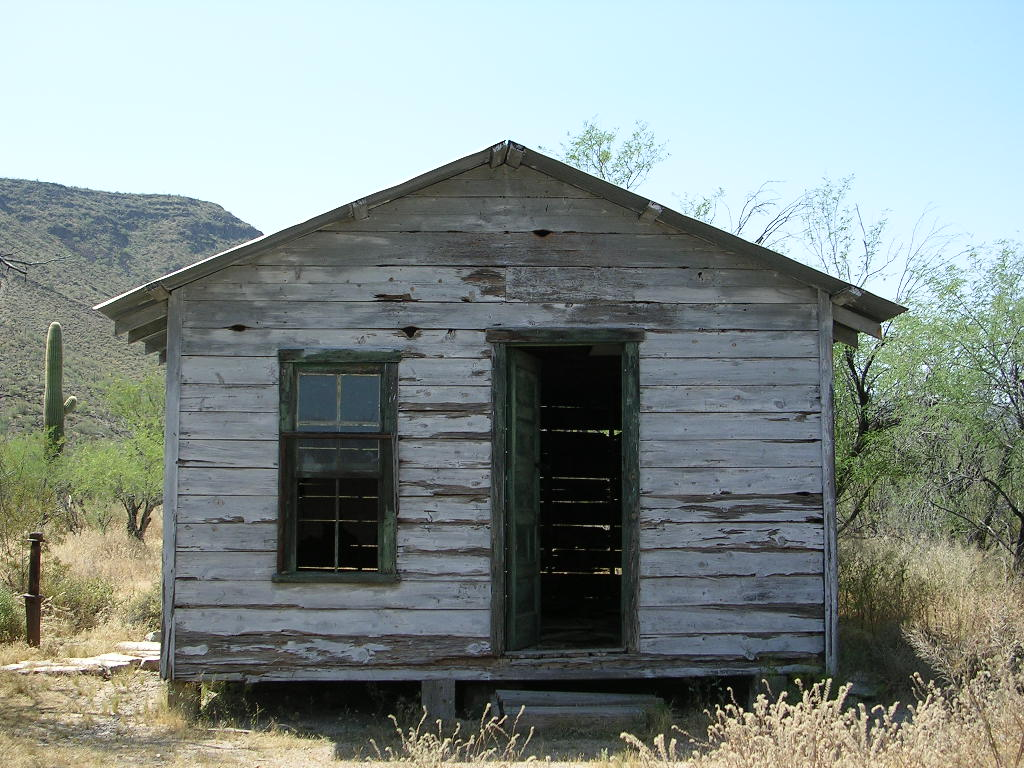
- Bates Well Ranch bunkhouse

- Location within Arizona Location within the United States
- Location: Pima County, Arizona, USA
- Nearest city: Ajo, Arizona
- Coordinates: 32°10′6″N 112°57′1″W
- Built: 1913
- Built by: Growler Copper Co.
- NRHP reference No.: 94000493
- Added to NRHP: May 20, 1994

The Bates Well Ranch, also known as the Bates Well, Growler Well, Gray Ranch and El Veit, was one of the fifteen ranches and line camps in the Gray family cattle business in the Sonoran Desert country north of the US-Mexico border in Pima County, Arizona. Operating for nearly 60 years, the ranch is now part of Organ Pipe Cactus National Monument.

The main ranch house was moved from Growler Mine to Bates Well in 1942, re-used in traditional frontier and Gray family practice. Probably originating as a miners' cabin, the northern portion was presumably added after its relocation at Bates Well. The original well may have been dug by W.B. Bates about 1870, with a later well dug by Reuben Daniels circa 1913. An arrastra, a simple ore-milling operation, existed in the early 20th century. The property was developed by Robert Louis Gray's son, Henry from 1935 on. Henry lived there until his death in 1976.

The Bates Well property represents a very complete and intact example of the frontier ranching pattern in Arizona typical of the Sonoran Desert during the first third of the twentieth century. The Gray family controlled essentially all ranching operations in the Organ Pipe National Monument area, including Aguajita Spring, Alamo Canyon Ranch, Bonita Well Line Camp, Bull Pasture, Cement Tank, Dos Lomitas Ranch, Dowling Ranch, Gachado Line Camp, Hocker Well, Pozo Nuevo Line Camp, Pozo Salado or Salt Well, Red Tanks Well, Wild Horse Tank and Williams Spring. Ranching operations ceased in 1976.
