= Puerto Peñasco =

Puerto Peñasco Geʼe Ṣuidagĭ (O'odham language)
- City
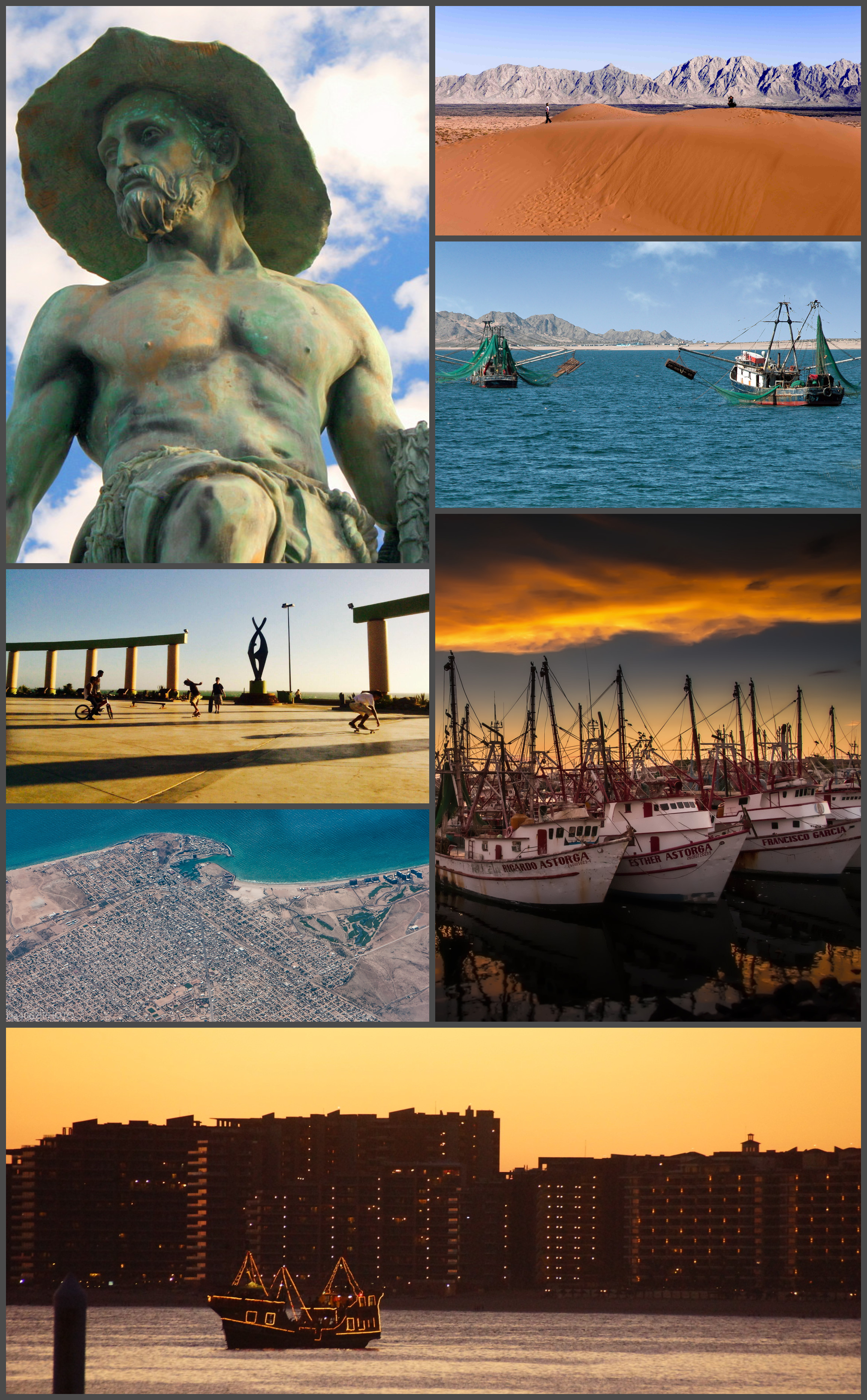
- From top, left to right: Camaronero Monument, View of the Gran Desierto de Altar from Puerto Peñasco, Puerto Peñasco fishing vessels, Plaza Gobernadores, Aerial view of Puerto Penasco, Boats in the Puerto Peñasco fishing harbor, Skyline view at sunset

- Coat of arms

- Location in Mexico Puerto Peñasco (Mexico)
- Coordinates: 31°19′00″N 113°32′13″W
- Country: Mexico
- State: Sonora
- Municipality: Puerto Peñasco
- Founded: 1927
- Municipal Status: 1952

Government
  - Municipal President: Óscar Eduardo Castro Castro; Morena

Area
  - Total: 9,774.45 km^{2} (3,773.94 sq mi)
- Elevation: 10 m (33 ft)

Population (2020)
  - Total: 62,689
- Time zone: UTC–07:00 (Zona Pacífico)
- Postal code (of seat): 83550
- Area code: +52 638
- Website: www.puertopenasco.gob.mx

Puerto Peñasco is a small city located in Puerto Peñasco Municipality in the northwest of the Mexican state of Sonora, 100 kilometres (62 mi) from the border with the U.S. state of Arizona. According to the 2020 census, it has a population of 62,689 inhabitants. It is located on the northern shores of the Sea of Cortez on the small strip of land that joins the Baja California Peninsula with the rest of Mexico. The area is part of the Altar Desert, one of the driest and hottest areas of the larger Sonoran Desert.

Since the late 1990s, there has been a push to develop the area for tourism. It is now one of the most important tourist destinations in northern Mexico. Puerto Peñasco is often called "Rocky Point" in English, and has been nicknamed "Arizona’s Beach" as it is the closest beach to cities such as Phoenix and Tucson. The warm sea surface temperatures of the northern end of the gulf cause Puerto Peñasco to have a much warmer climate than coastal cities on the Pacific both in the Mexican and American Californias. Nights also remain hot and muggy during summer due to the warm-water influence.

The Mar de Cortés International Airport serves Puerto Peñasco, but currently has no regularly scheduled flights in or out. A new highway shortens the drive from California by 160 km (100 mi). Tourism and fishing are the most important economic activities for the city. Development to date includes over one hundred restaurants, forty-two hotels and motels, and fourteen RV facilities. The new "Home Port del Mar de Cortés" (Sea of Cortez) cruise ship terminal began construction in 2014 between Sandy Beach and Cholla Bay (La Choya), northwest of the central city. The construction has been suspended for financial reasons.

== History ==
The city is known by two names, Puerto Peñasco (rocky cliff port) in Spanish and Rocky Point in English. In 1826, retired Robert William Hale Hardy of the British Royal Navy was sailing in this area searching for pearls and precious metals. He named the area Rocky Point, and it was identified as Rocky Point on marine maps until President Lázaro Cárdenas changed it to Puerto Punta Peñasco. To simplify pronunciation, the English name lost the word “Port” and the Spanish name dropped “Punta”.

Prior to the 1920s, the area was just one of the safe harbors for wandering fishermen who worked the upper Gulf of California. During fishing seasons, fishermen from Guaymas, Bahía Kino, Puerto Libertad, and Puerto Lobos began to come here to camp out. The main attraction for these fishermen was a fish called totoaba, which was fished not for its meat, but for its use in medicine. At this time the area was known as Punta de Piedra o Punta Peñasco. The name comes from a large quantity of solidified lava that hit the Gulf. Even as early as the 19th century, fishermen from Arizona came here. Since there was no source of drinking water, it was not settled permanently.

In the 1930s, under President Lázaro Cárdenas, a railroad was built to connect Baja California to the rest of Mexico, passing by Puerto Peñasco. The town began to grow again, adding a police delegation in 1932, as a dependency of the nearby municipality of Sonoyta, even though the town was part of the municipality of Caborca. The railroad line created new population centers and the initial layout of the city and port of Puerto Peñasco was begun in the 1940s. During this same time shrimp fishing was having an impact on the local economy.

In 1952, Puerto Peñasco separated from the municipality of Caborca and comprised the localities of Sonoyta, Bahía La Choya, 21 de Marzo and Cuauhtémoc. Sonoyta was the second largest population center at the time. In 1989, the municipality of Plutarco Elías Calles was split from Puerto Peñasco. Until the 1990s, there had been little tourism here except for campers and fishermen. The municipality's pristine beaches with clear waters stretched for a hundred miles north or south with almost no development. The push to make Puerto Peñasco or Rocky Point a major tourism center was initiated in 1993, with the government joining with private investors to build condominiums and other facilities. The goal has been to take advantage of the area's proximity to the United States.

Much of the inspiration for the effort came from the success of Cancún, which was a nearly virgin beach before a government/private venture developed it. Another reason to look to tourism was the declining catches of fishermen here, due to overfishing and pollution. The federal government contributed two billion pesos in infrastructure, especially roadways and an airport and the area was declared a free zone, meaning foreigners could visit the area without a visa (although a passport is still needed). There was some economic instability in 1994 and 1995, but it did not derail development here for long, coming back by 1999. Between 2002 and 2007 economic growth was at twelve percent. The local real estate market started to go bust in 2007 due to the economic slowdown in the United States.

== Cityscape ==
The oldest part of the town was founded between the edge of the sea and Ballena Hill. The base of the area is volcanic rock, much of it solidified lava flows from when ancient eruptions met the ocean. To promote tourism here, the city was declared to be part of the border “free zone” although it is about 100 km (62 mi) from the U.S. This means that foreigners can drive from the U.S. to Puerto Peñasco without obtaining visas. This makes the area attractive to visitors from Arizona, California, and Nevada. In a relatively short time, Puerto Peñasco has become a major tourist center. It contains numerous hotels as well as RV and primitive camping sites. Puerto Peñasco is described as "by far the most American city in Mexico" and "Arizona’s beach", with Tucson, Phoenix, and Yuma closer than the Mexican cities of Mexicali and Hermosillo. Most visitors come for the beaches and to fish. The annual fishing festival begins on Navy Day on June 1. These celebrations feature mariachis, folklorico dance, and a festival queen. Another fishing tournament is sponsored by the La Choya Bay Club. Beaches here include Sandy Beach, Las Conchas, El Mirador, La Choya, Playa Encanto, Estero de Morúa, Playa La Joya, Playa Miramar, and Playa San Jorge. Sandy Beach is noted for its sand which is a light brown color. One attraction of the beaches is the tidal pools. Tides here can raise and lower the sea on the relatively flat land up to 8 m (26 ft). Low tide reveals a large number of tidal pools in the craters of the rocky coast. In these pools there used to be large numbers of crabs, starfish, and other marine life. There is also an estuary by the name of Morúa east of the community of Las Conchas. Here live thousands of birds, including migratory species.

A large number of beachfront condominiums have been built in this area including Las Conchas, Sandy Beach Resorts, Costa Diamante, Las Palomas Beach and Golf Resort, Sonoran Sea, Bella Sirena, and Las Palmas. The first condos, Las Conchas and Bahías Choya, were built in the far southeast and far northwest respectively. Interest in property here has been unexpectedly strong, prompting further developments such as Sandy Beach. This development has plans for a golf course, malls, marinas and more condos.

Crafts for sale here include shell jewelry, iron pieces and carved ironwood.

The airport is a joint government and private enterprise project which was inaugurated in 2008 and has a daily capacity of 2,000 passengers. Puerto Peñasco is a popular destination for spring break, especially for high school and college students from Arizona and California for both its proximity and its 18-year-old legal drinking age.

The Universidad de Sonora has its Centro de Investigaciones Científicas y Tecnológicas (Scientific and Technological Research Center) as well as its Centro de Estudios del Desierto (Center for Desert Studies) here which are open to visitors. These institutions started as a joint project with the Laboratory of Atmospheric Sciences of the University of Arizona in 1963 to develop methods of desalinization of sea water. In 1973 and 1974, the Unidad Experimental Peñasco was founded to research the raising of blue shrimp or Penaeus stylirostris. This project has been the leader in the development of shrimp farming techniques in Mexico. The CET-MAR Aquarium is a marine research center open to the public with displays of marine life such as turtles, octopus, and numerous fish species.

Many residents are from the United States or Canada. Most restaurants offer menus in English, and most businesses accept U.S. dollars. Puerto Peñasco is popular with retirees, especially those from the United States and Canada who have trailers and RVs. However, there are retirees here from all over the world. The town also has newspapers in English.

== Geography ==
The city of Puerto Peñasco (Rocky Point) is found in the northwest of the Mexican state of Sonora, a state that is located directly to the south of the U.S. state of Arizona. It is located on the eastern coast of the Gulf of California approximately 60 miles (100 km) south of the Arizonan border, only about a four-hour drive from Phoenix or Tucson. The city's maximum elevation is 100 meters (328 feet) above sea level and its minimum is 0 meters (0 feet) above sea level. It is found in the Sonoran Desert, a desert which stretches from the U.S. states of Arizona and California down to the northern tip of the Mexican state of Sinaloa. Because of this, its climate reaches extreme temperatures during the summer and relatively high temperatures in the winter. The city itself is relatively flat, with the exception of Ballena hill that is found near its port. Further, remnants of ancient volcanoes can be found on the beaches of Puerto Peñasco and several dormant volcano peaks can be seen throughout the entire state.

=== Climate ===
Puerto Peñasco has a desert climate (Köppen climate classification BWh) with an average of 10 days of rain per year. The average yearly high temperature is 27.5 °C (81.5 °F), but temperatures of 40 °C (104.0 °F) are very common in the summer months. The average yearly low temperature is 17.5 °C (63.5 °F), and frosts are rare. Though very rare, it is possible for a tropical storm or hurricane to reach the northern Gulf of California and cause significant damage. Hurricane Kathleen in 1976, Hurricane Nora in 1997, and Hurricane Rosa in 2018 were the most recent hurricanes to hit Puerto Peñasco. Due to the influence of the Gulf waters, summers are moderated compared to inland areas in both Sonora and Arizona to its north in terms of air temperature, although the apparent temperature remains very hot due to high humidity.

Climate data for Puerto Peñasco (1981–2010), extremes (1971–present)
Month	Jan	Feb	Mar	Apr	May	Jun	Jul	Aug	Sep	Oct	Nov	Dec	Year
Record high °C (°F)	30.0 (86.0)	31.2 (88.2)	37.0 (98.6)	40.6 (105.1)	39.0 (102.2)	43.0 (109.4)	41.0 (105.8)	42.4 (108.3)	42.5 (108.5)	40.0 (104.0)	33.2 (91.8)	27.0 (80.6)	43.0 (109.4)
Mean daily maximum °C (°F)	19.1 (66.4)	20.3 (68.5)	23.2 (73.8)	26.1 (79.0)	29.3 (84.7)	32.5 (90.5)	34.9 (94.8)	35.7 (96.3)	35.0 (95.0)	30.3 (86.5)	24.5 (76.1)	18.8 (65.8)	27.5 (81.5)
Daily mean °C (°F)	14.2 (57.6)	15.4 (59.7)	17.7 (63.9)	20.5 (68.9)	23.9 (75.0)	27.3 (81.1)	31.0 (87.8)	31.6 (88.9)	30.2 (86.4)	24.8 (76.6)	18.9 (66.0)	14.3 (57.7)	22.5 (72.5)
Mean daily minimum °C (°F)	9.3 (48.7)	10.5 (50.9)	12.3 (54.1)	14.9 (58.8)	18.5 (65.3)	22.2 (72.0)	27.2 (81.0)	27.6 (81.7)	25.4 (77.7)	19.2 (66.6)	13.3 (55.9)	9.8 (49.6)	17.5 (63.5)
Record low °C (°F)	−8.0 (17.6)	−2.0 (28.4)	−2.0 (28.4)	2.0 (35.6)	8.0 (46.4)	11.5 (52.7)	11.8 (53.2)	17.0 (62.6)	14.0 (57.2)	2.0 (35.6)	2.0 (35.6)	−6.0 (21.2)	−8.0 (17.6)
Average precipitation mm (inches)	5.9 (0.23)	8.9 (0.35)	6.3 (0.25)	2.9 (0.11)	0.1 (0.00)	0.3 (0.01)	3.8 (0.15)	1.6 (0.06)	8.3 (0.33)	7.8 (0.31)	5.1 (0.20)	15.0 (0.59)	66.0 (2.60)
Average precipitation days (≥ 0.1 mm)	1.2	1.4	1.2	0.6	0.0	0.1	0.9	0.4	0.7	1.2	0.8	1.9	10.4
Average relative humidity (%)	61	67	62	61	60	62	70	65	63	58	57	73	63
Source: Servicio Meteorológico Nacional

Average sea temperature
Jan	Feb	Mar	Apr	May	Jun	Jul	Aug	Sep	Oct	Nov	Dec
63 °F; 17 °C	61 °F; 16 °C	63 °F; 17 °C	66 °F; 19 °C	70 °F; 21 °C	73 °F; 23 °C	79 °F; 26 °C	82 °F; 28 °C	82 °F; 28 °C	79 °F; 26 °C	73 °F; 23 °C	66 °F; 19 °C

== Demographics ==
Historical population
Year	Pop.	±%
1990	26,625	—
1995	27,169	+2.0%
2000	31,157	+14.7%
2005	44,875	+44.0%
2010	57,342	+27.8%
2015	62,177	+8.4%
2020	62,689	+0.8%

As of 2020, the city of Puerto Peñasco has a total of 62,689 inhabitants, making it the eighth largest locality in the state. The population of the town has doubled since the year 2000, due to the developments in tourism.

=== Education and Health ===
According to data provided by the 2010 census, approximately 2.65% of the population over the age of 15 are illiterate. And about 15.02% of the same age do not have a basic primary education. About 3.48% of children between the ages of 6 and 14 do not attend any type of institution of education. Furthermore, about 36.73% of inhabitants over the age of 15 did not finish their primary education, and about 31.74% of the population is not inscribed in any government health service. However, since 2010 Puerto Peñasco has been among the healthiest cities in the state.

==== Institutes of Education ====
Puerto Peñasco is full of educational institutions ranging from elementary schools to universities. The city also houses several private schools and trade schools. Since 2015, the following have been registered in the municipality.

· A school that specializes in special education of public character and administration for the Federal Government.

· Four education centers of elementary education, three private and one public.

· Fifteen kindergarten schools, ten of which are public and five of which are private.

· Twenty-three elementary schools, twenty of which are public and three that are private.

· Four public and two private high schools.

==== Universities ====
· Superior Technological Institute of Puerto Peñasco.

· Technological University of Puerto Peñasco.

· University of Professional Development.

· CEUNO University.

==== Health Centers ====
Puerto Peñasco also has two General Hospitals, a Center of Urban Health, a Hospital of Social Insurance, a Family Medical Unit of the IMSS (Mexican Social Security Institute), as well as many clinics and private consults all around the city.

== In popular culture ==
- The city is mentioned in Season 3 Episode 6 of Narcos: Mexico, when Ismael "El Mayo" Zambada tells Francisco Rafael Arellano Félix and Enedina Arellano Félix, "Amado's expanded operations - taken over Puerto Peñasco, made it hard for my boats to unload."
- Season 1 Episode 7 of the Netflix series Yankee is entitled "Penélope in Puerto Peñasco."
- The Hoyt Axton song “Evangelina” mentions Puerto Peñasco as the home of the protagonist’s Mexican lover.
