= Puerto Peñasco Municipality =

Coordinates: 31.4095°N 113.2486°W

Puerto Peñasco
- Municipality
- Coat of arms

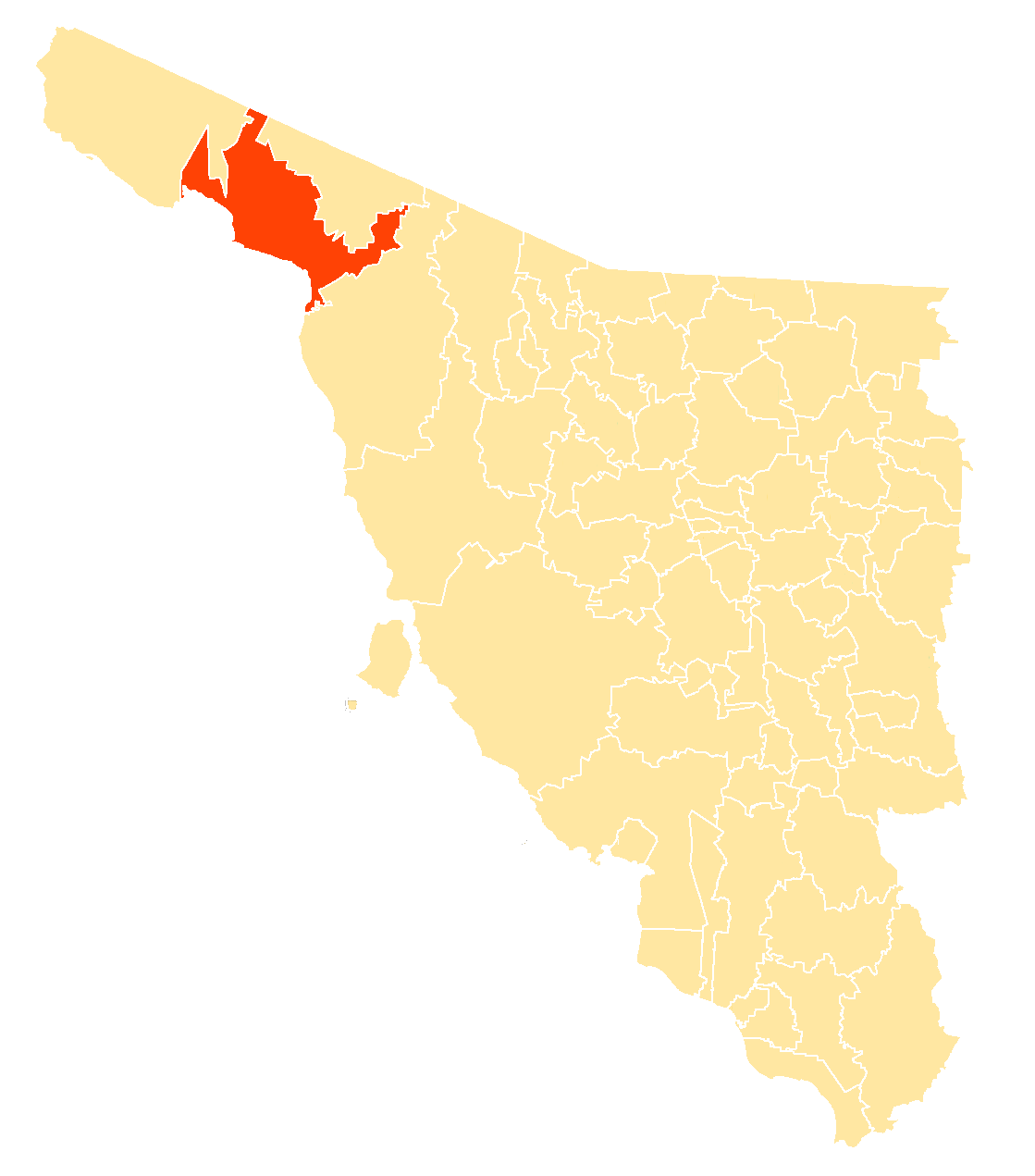
- Location of the municipality in Sonora
- Country: Mexico
- State: Sonora
- Seat: Puerto Peñasco

Population (2015)
  - Total: 62,177
- Time zone: UTC–07:00 (Zona Pacífico)
- Area code: +52 638

Puerto Peñasco is a municipality in the state of Sonora in north-western Mexico. As of 2015, the municipality had a total population of 62,177 inhabitants. The only locality with a significant population is the municipal seat, also named Puerto Peñasco, which contains almost 99% of the municipality's population.

Most of the municipality consists of empty stretches of the Gran Desierto de Altar (Altar Desert) adjacent to and south of the international border with the U.S. state of Arizona.

== Geography ==
The municipality lies at the northern end of the Gulf of California (Sea of Cortez).

As municipal seat, the city of Puerto Peñasco has governing jurisdiction over 27 other named communities, which cover a territory of 9,774.5 square kilometres (3,774.0 sq mi). The municipality has a total population of 62,177 inhabitants. The municipality borders with the municipalities of San Luis Río Colorado Municipality, Plutarco Elías Calles Municipality, and Caborca Municipality. To its north-northwest is Yuma County, Arizona, in the United States, and to the south is the Gulf of California.

=== Adjacent municipalities (municipios) and counties ===
- San Luis Río Colorado - west
- Caborca - southeast
- Plutarco Elías Calles - northeast
- Yuma County, Arizona - northwest

== The municipality ==
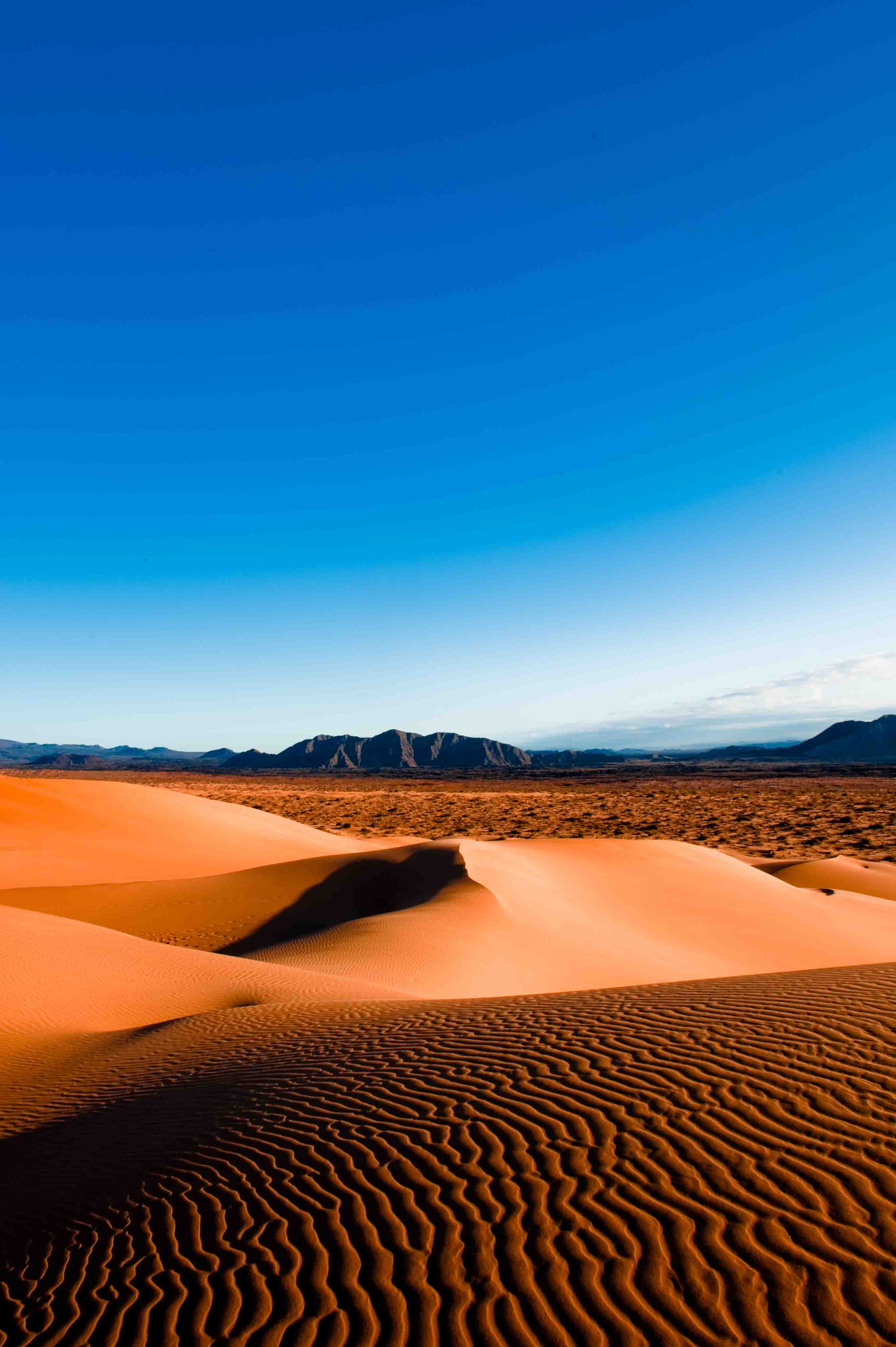
Pinacate sand dunes

The land is generally flat with the small mountain range of Sonoyta to the north and east of the area. Most of the territory is the Altar Desert, which extends north and east of the city, and a volcanic zone called Sierra El Pinacate. The municipality has 110 km of beaches. Near the city are fields of sand dunes of the Altar Desert, which is one of the driest in the world. ATVs and motocross are permitted on the sand dunes. Most vegetation and animal life is typical for sandy deserts, scrub brush, reptiles (including the Gila monster) and small mammals.

Farming and livestock is nearly non-existent due to the dry conditions. Some industry exists, associated with fishing such as canning and freezing. The commercial sector of the economy support 57% of the population selling food, clothes, pharmaceuticals and other items to both the local population and to tourists. The second most important economic sector is fishing, especially shrimp fishing. Tourism drives most of the commercial sector. The municipality receives about 1,000 visitors a day, with about 85% coming from the U.S. state of Arizona.

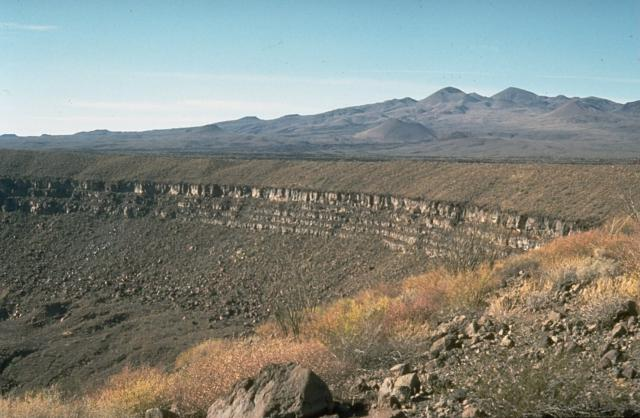
View of the Pinacate volcanic area from the Elegante Crater

El Pinacate is a volcanic region and a biosphere reserve that covers 714,556.6 hectares which covers parts of the municipalities of Puerto Peñasco, San Luis Río Colorado and Plutarco Elías Calles. This area has been considered one of the most arid and inhospitable of the Sonoran Desert. In spite of this, the area contains a wide variety of wildlife and evidence of human habitation from ancient times, which has attracted the attention of both tourists and researchers. It contains 553 species of plants with cactuses such as saguaros, chollas and ocotillos dominating. With the rainy season, the area explodes with short-lived wildflowers. The area also contains 41 species of mammals, 237 species of birds, 45 species of reptiles, and four types of amphibians. It was declared a protected biosphere reserve by the Mexican government in 1993. The entrance to the biosphere park is located 50 km from the city of Puerto Peñasco. The nucleus of the biosphere consists of the Sierra el Pinacate, Adair Bay and Sierra del Rosario which cannot be developed under any circumstances. The main attraction for tourists is the volcanic craters. The major ones are named Badillo, Molina (or Trébol), McDougal (the largest) and Caravajales. In addition, there is the Grande Volcano which stands at 3,200 feet tall, and has a depth of 950 ft.

San Jorge Island, also known as Bird Island, is really a small group of rocky outcroppings that are just above the surface of the sea about 40 km southeast of the city. The rocks are capped in white like the Alps, not with snow, but with the guano of innumerable sea birds such as seagulls and pelicans, which live here. Below the birds live approximately 3,000 sea lions very close to the water. It is the largest concentration of sea lions in Mexico. It is possible to kayak and/or snorkel here.

Nine native cultures can be found in the municipality. The Guarijíos have a wide variety of crafts such as figures made with natural materials such as palm fronds and clay. They also make hats from a variety of natural fibers. The Mayos, who call themselves the Yoreme, have a rich oral tradition. Other groups include the Opatas, the Papagos, the Pimas, the Seris, the Yaquis, the Cucapa, and the Kikapu, all of whom are noted for basketmaking using desert plants.

== Government ==
=== Municipal presidents ===
Municipal president	Term	Political party	Notes
Víctor Estrella Bustamante	1951–1954	PRI	
Rodolfo Rogel Villa	1954–1957	PRI	
Julián Bustamante	1957–1958	PRI	
Rafael Godoy Cisneros	1958–1960	PRI	
Eduardo Ibarra	1961–1964	PRI	
Francisco Higuera Padilla	1964–1967	PRI	
Gerardo Portugal Coronado	1967–1970	PRI	
Valente Cornejo López	1970–1973	PRI	
Óscar Palacio Madueño	1973–1976	PRI	
Gilberto Castillo Montiel	1976–1979	PRI	
Fernando Pérez Barnett	1979–1982	PRI	
Alfredo López Aceves	1982–1985	PRI	
Gerardo Portugal Martínez	1985–1988	PRI	
Genaro Alfredo Gastélum Cinco	1988–1991	PRI	
Fernando Martínez Vázquez	1991–1994	PRI	
Óscar F. Palacio Soto	1994	PRI	Acting municipal president
Reyes Guadalupe Hernández Vega	1994–1997	PRI	
Manuel Guillermo Flores Díaz	1997–2000	PAN	
José Rodrigo Vélez Acosta	2000–2003	PRI	
Francisco Ramón Martínez González	2003–2006	PRI	
Heriberto Rentería Sánchez	2006–2009	PRI; Panal	Coalition "Alliance PRI Sonora–Panal"
Alejandro Zepeda Munro	2009–2012	PAN	
Gerardo Figueroa Zazueta	2012–2015	PRI; PVEM	
Ernesto Roger Munro, Jr.	2015–2018	PAN	
Ernesto Roger Munro, Jr.	2018–2021	PAN; PRD	Coalition "For Sonora to the Front"
Jorge Iván Pivac Carrillo	2021–2024	PAN; PRI; PRD	
Óscar Eduardo Castro Castro	2024–	Morena; PVEM; PT; Panal Sonora; PES Sonora	
