= Organ Pipe Cactus National Monument =

UNESCO biosphere reserve in Arizona, United States

- IUCN category V (protected landscape/seascape)
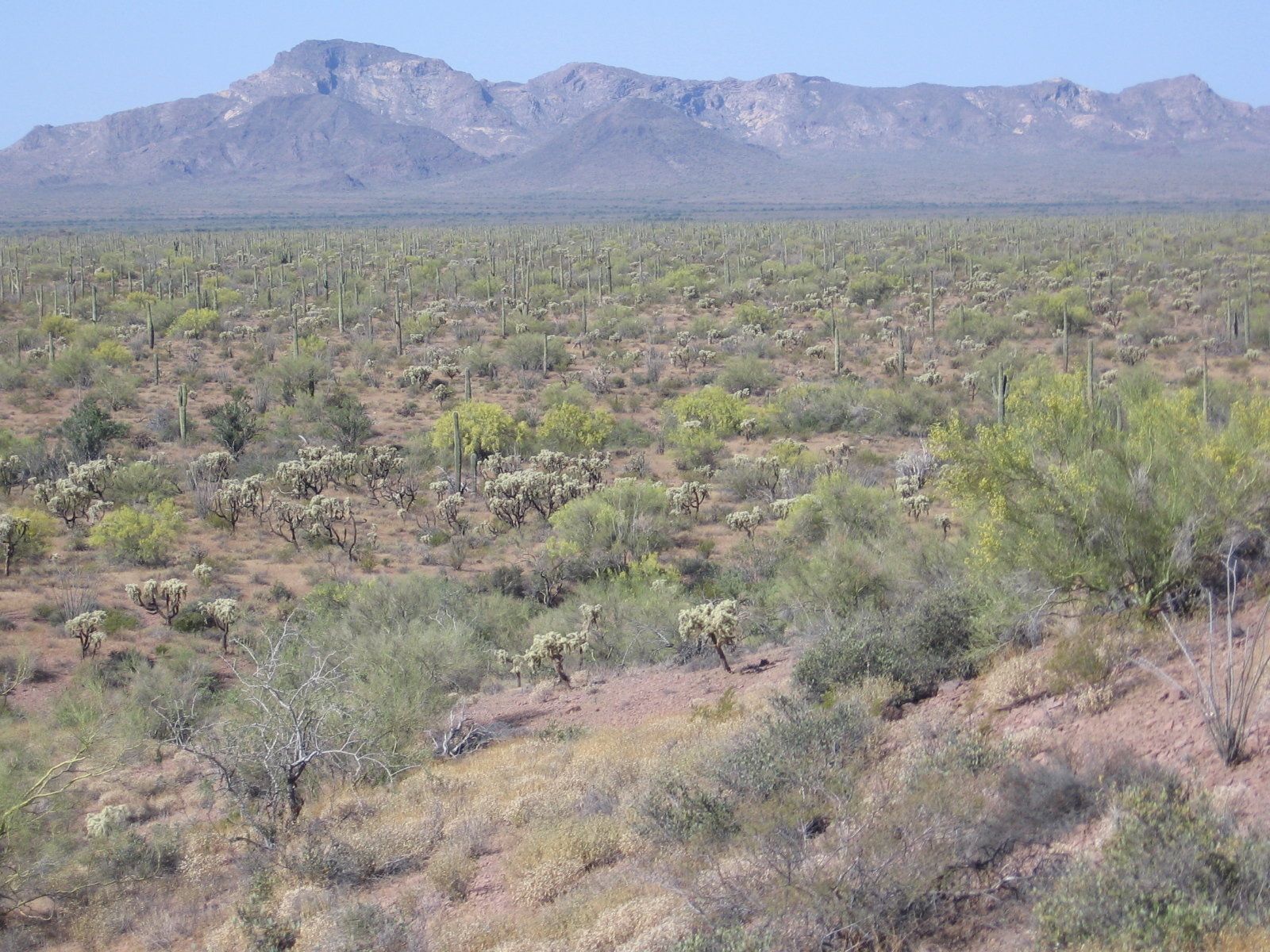

- Location within Arizona Location within the United States
- Interactive map of Organ Pipe Cactus National Monument
- Location: Pima County, Arizona, US
- Nearest city: Ajo, Arizona
- Coordinates: 31°57′14″N 112°48′04″W
- Area: 330,688 acres (1,338.25 km^{2})
- Created: April 13, 1937
- Visitors: 174,623 (in 2025)
- Governing body: National Park Service
- Website: Organ Pipe Cactus National Monument

U.S. National Monument

Short video showing panoramas from Organ Pipe Cactus National Monument

Organ Pipe Cactus National Monument is a U.S. national monument and UNESCO biosphere reserve located in southern Arizona that shares a border with the Mexican state of Sonora. The park is one of the few places in the United States where the senita and organ pipe cactus grow wild. Along with these species, many other types of cacti and other flora native to the Yuma Desert section of the Sonoran Desert region grow in the park. Organ Pipe Cactus National Monument is 517 sq mi (1,340 km^{2}) in size. In 1976 the monument was declared a Biosphere Reserve by UNESCO, and in 1977 95% of the monument was declared a wilderness area.

In 1937 the land was officially opened as a national monument.

At the north entrance of the park is the unincorporated community of Why, Arizona; the town of Lukeville, Arizona at the park's southern border is a border crossing point to Sonoyta, Sonora, Mexico.

Organ Pipe Cactus National Monument is bordered to the northwest by Cabeza Prieta National Wildlife Refuge and to the east by the Tohono Oʼodham Indian Reservation.

== Mexico-United States barrier ==
On August 9, 2002 during a United States Border Patrol operation, Ranger Kristopher "Kris" Eggle was shot and killed by a drug smuggler. With a continuing, steady flow of immigrants and drug runners from Mexico, the majority of the Organ Pipe Cactus National Monument was closed in 2003. On July 29, 2003, the park's visitor center was re-designated by the United States Congress as the Kris Eggle Visitor Center. The National Park Service reopened the backcountry in 2014 after surveillance towers, vehicle barriers, and pedestrian fences were installed along the border.

The first 30-foot (9.1 m) panels of a new Arizona, US-Mexico border wall were installed in August 2019 on a two-mile (3.2 km) stretch of Organ Pipe Cactus National Monument. It is the first of three projects that will add bollard walls along Southern Arizona's wildlife refuges. The National Park Service issued a report on September 18, 2019, stating that the barrier wall threatens archaeological artifacts representing 16,000 years of human history. The U.S. Customs and Border Protection agency said that five archaeological sites fall within the area that it wishes to construct.

In February 2020, controlled demolition and other construction work was performed within the Roosevelt Reservation. This strip of land along the border is federally controlled. Many sites within this region are considered sacred by the Tohono Oʼodham Nation. Important sites include Monument Hill, which is a ceremonial and historic battle site and burial ground; and Quitobaquito Springs, which is a local water source and the site of an annual salt pilgrimage. For this reason, construction was opposed by many locals, including Representative Raúl Grijalva and Tohono O’odham Nation Chairman Ned Norris, Jr., who testified before Congress on the matter. Customs and Border Protection officials maintained that no human remains or artifacts were discovered in the areas where explosives were used, and that Monument Hill was previously disturbed in 2010 during construction of a border wall. In 2026, construction began on a second wall parallel with the existing wall.

== Climate ==
Organ Pipe Cactus National Monument has a hot desert climate (Köppen: BWh) with very hot summers and mild winters.

Climate data for Organ Pipe Cactus National Monument, Arizona, 1991–2020 normals, extremes 1944–present
Month	Jan	Feb	Mar	Apr	May	Jun	Jul	Aug	Sep	Oct	Nov	Dec	Year
Record high °F (°C)	90 (32)	95 (35)	99 (37)	104 (40)	111 (44)	119 (48)	118 (48)	116 (47)	113 (45)	107 (42)	98 (37)	88 (31)	119 (48)
Mean maximum °F (°C)	81.3 (27.4)	84.2 (29.0)	90.8 (32.7)	97.9 (36.6)	103.4 (39.7)	110.1 (43.4)	111.5 (44.2)	110.4 (43.6)	106.9 (41.6)	100.0 (37.8)	89.9 (32.2)	80.2 (26.8)	112.7 (44.8)
Mean daily maximum °F (°C)	70.7 (21.5)	73.0 (22.8)	79.2 (26.2)	85.8 (29.9)	93.3 (34.1)	101.8 (38.8)	103.8 (39.9)	103.2 (39.6)	99.1 (37.3)	90.0 (32.2)	78.9 (26.1)	69.9 (21.1)	87.4 (30.8)
Daily mean °F (°C)	56.0 (13.3)	57.9 (14.4)	63.3 (17.4)	68.8 (20.4)	76.3 (24.6)	84.8 (29.3)	89.7 (32.1)	89.3 (31.8)	84.5 (29.2)	74.3 (23.5)	63.4 (17.4)	55.4 (13.0)	72.0 (22.2)
Mean daily minimum °F (°C)	41.4 (5.2)	42.9 (6.1)	47.3 (8.5)	51.9 (11.1)	59.3 (15.2)	67.8 (19.9)	75.6 (24.2)	75.3 (24.1)	69.9 (21.1)	58.5 (14.7)	47.9 (8.8)	40.9 (4.9)	56.6 (13.7)
Mean minimum °F (°C)	29.2 (−1.6)	31.6 (−0.2)	35.9 (2.2)	39.9 (4.4)	48.2 (9.0)	56.4 (13.6)	65.8 (18.8)	66.3 (19.1)	58.8 (14.9)	45.3 (7.4)	35.5 (1.9)	29.3 (−1.5)	26.8 (−2.9)
Record low °F (°C)	14 (−10)	18 (−8)	16 (−9)	31 (−1)	30 (−1)	46 (8)	52 (11)	50 (10)	46 (8)	29 (−2)	24 (−4)	18 (−8)	14 (−10)
Average precipitation inches (mm)	0.99 (25)	0.89 (23)	0.78 (20)	0.31 (7.9)	0.18 (4.6)	0.11 (2.8)	1.32 (34)	1.82 (46)	0.75 (19)	0.56 (14)	0.44 (11)	1.13 (29)	9.28 (236)
Average precipitation days (≥ 0.01 inch)	3.2	3.7	3.0	1.1	0.6	0.5	4.3	6.0	3.0	1.8	2.1	4.0	33.3
Source: NOAA

== Gallery ==
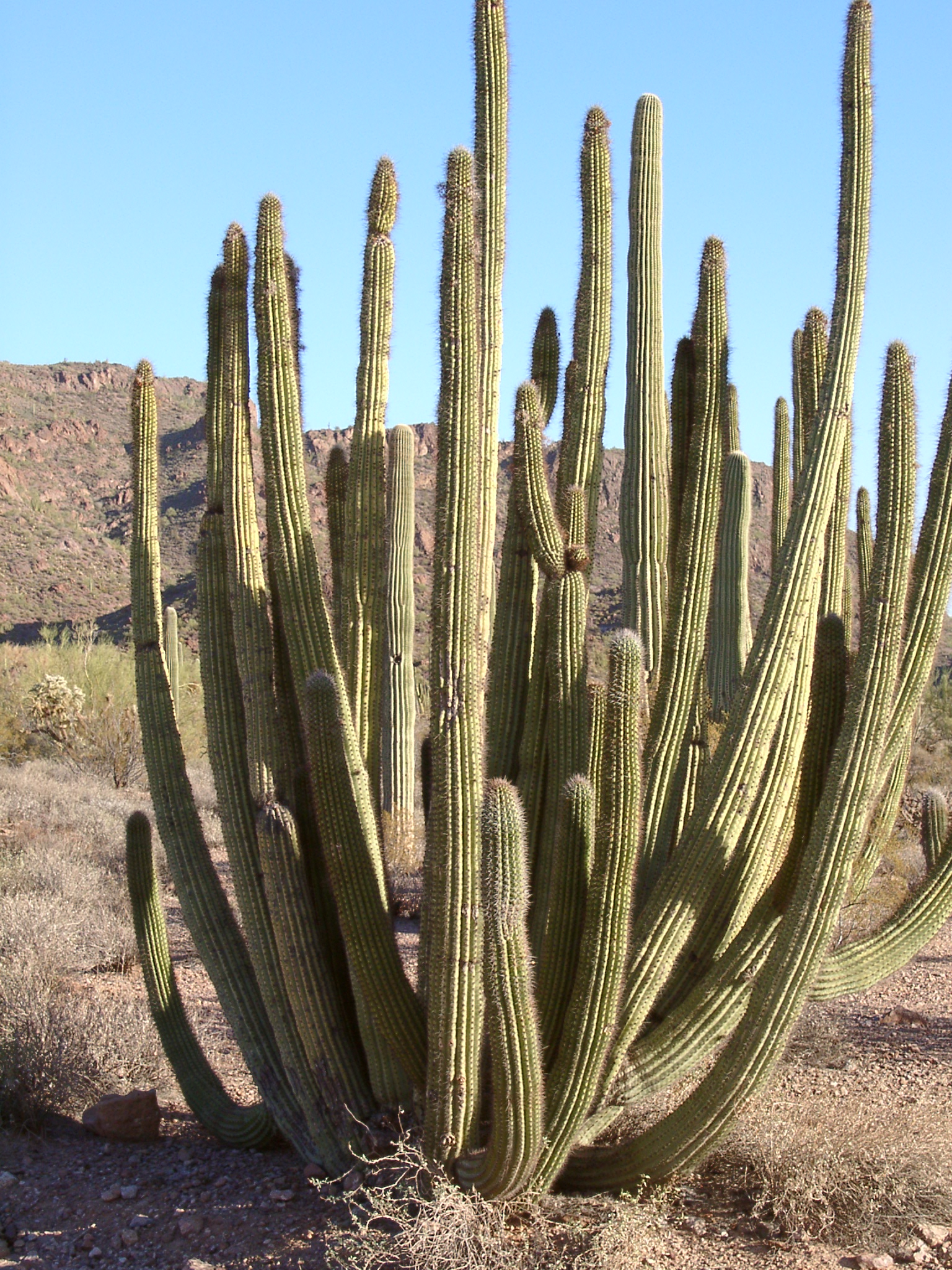
An organ pipe cactus in the monument

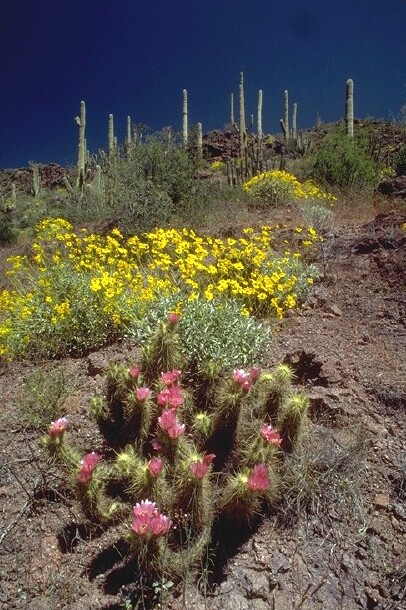
Hedgehog cactus and brittlebush in bloom at the national monument

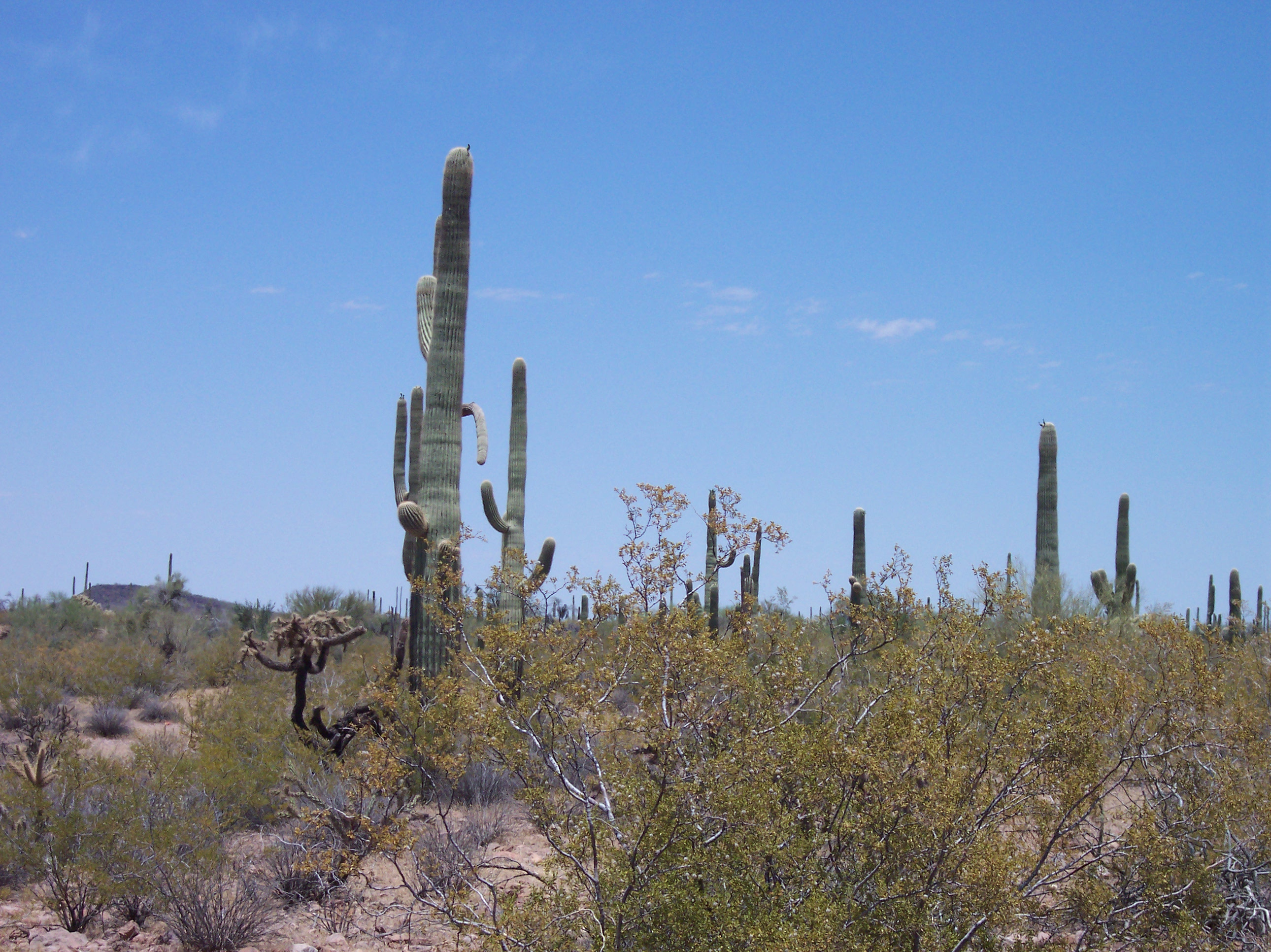
The monument is also home to many saguaro cacti.

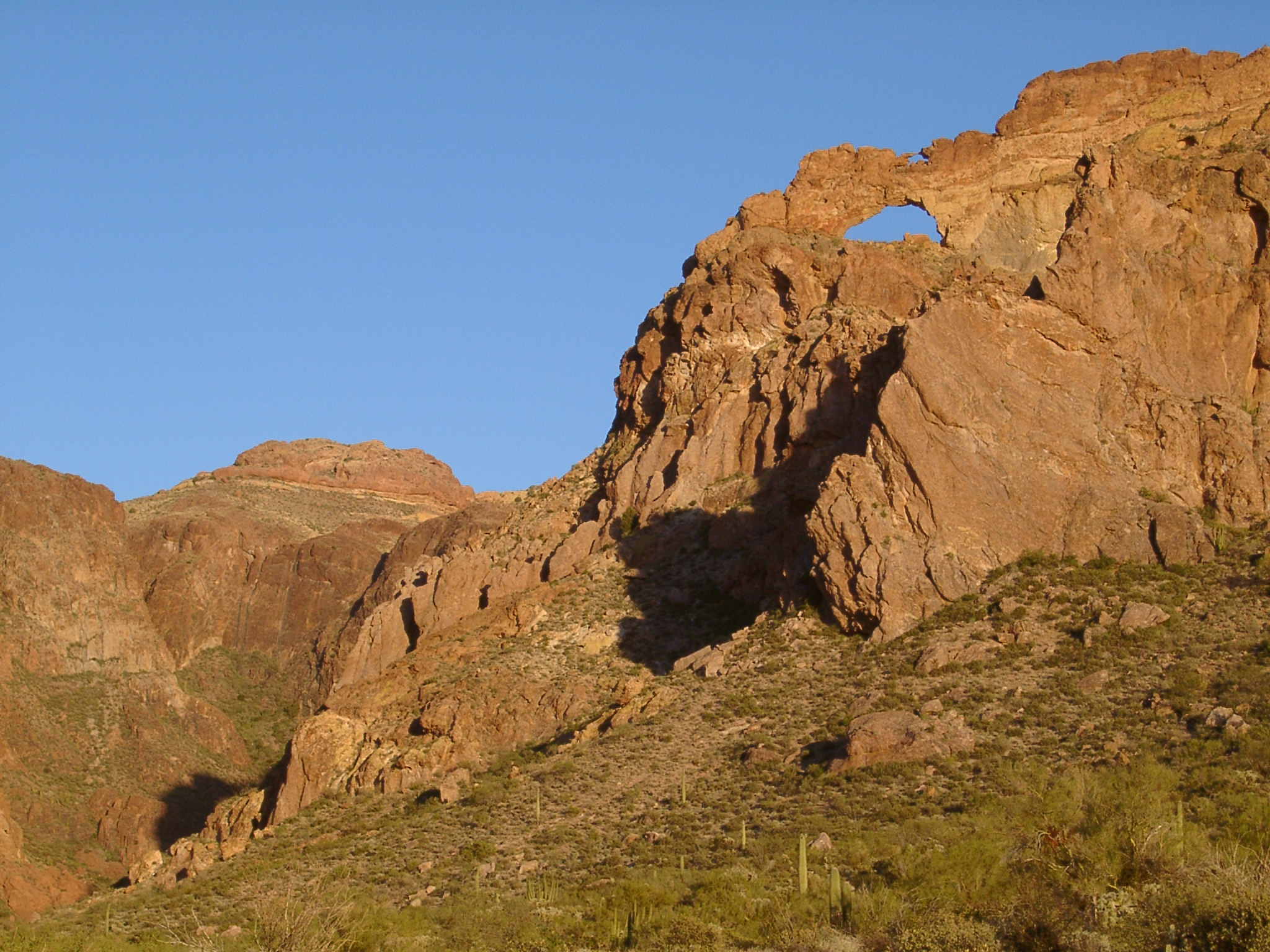
The monument contains a pair of natural arches.

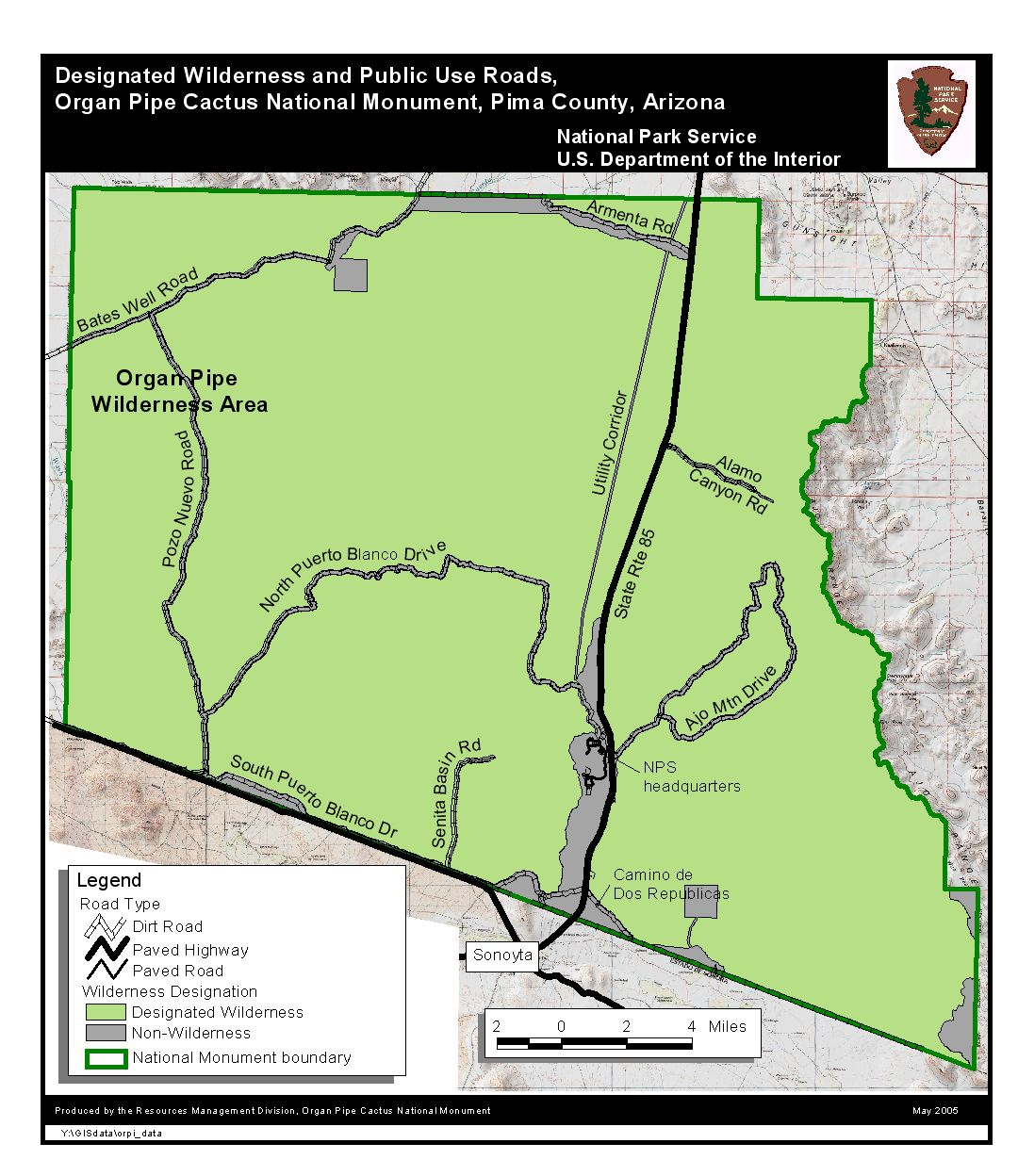
Map of Organ Pipe and its designated wilderness

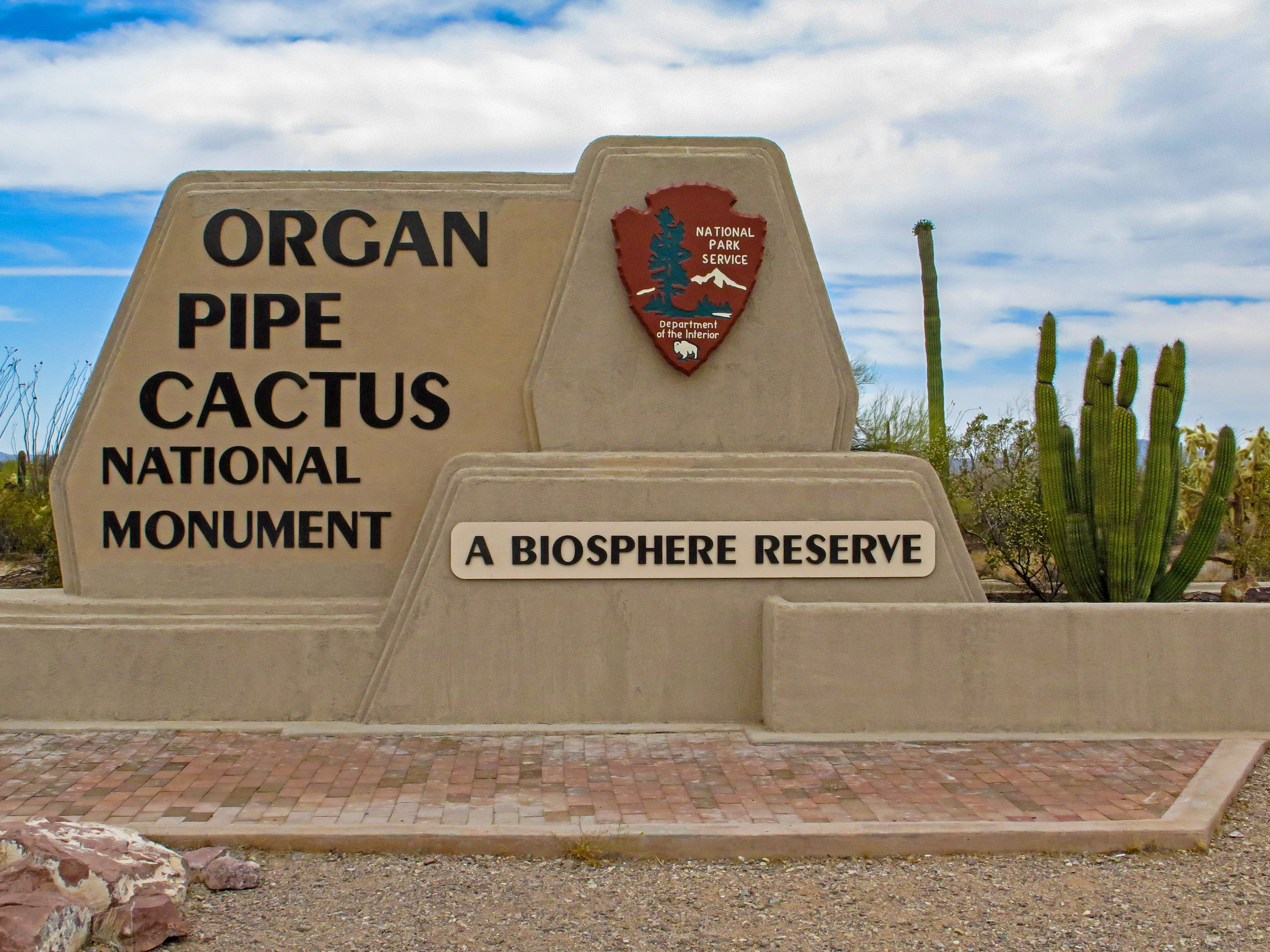
Organ Pipe Cactus National Monument, National Park Service

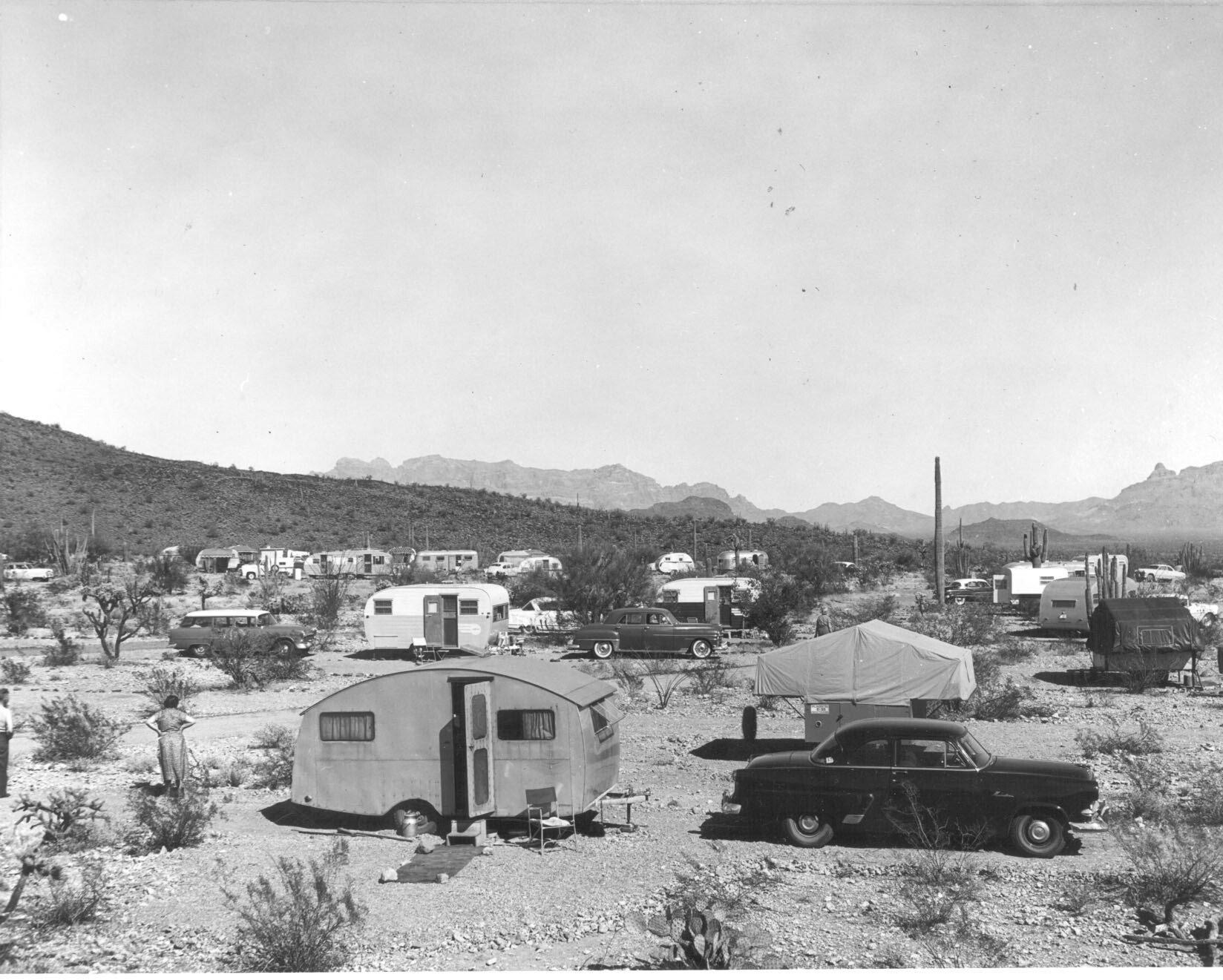
Organ Pipe Cactus National Monument campsite

== See also ==
- List of national monuments of the United States
- Bates Well Ranch, listed on the National Register of Historic Places within the park
- Dos Lomitas Ranch, also listed on the NRHP
- Growler Valley and Growler Mountains, geographic features located within the park
- El Camino del Diablo, historic road that traverses a section of the monument
