= Sonoyta =

- Town and Municipality
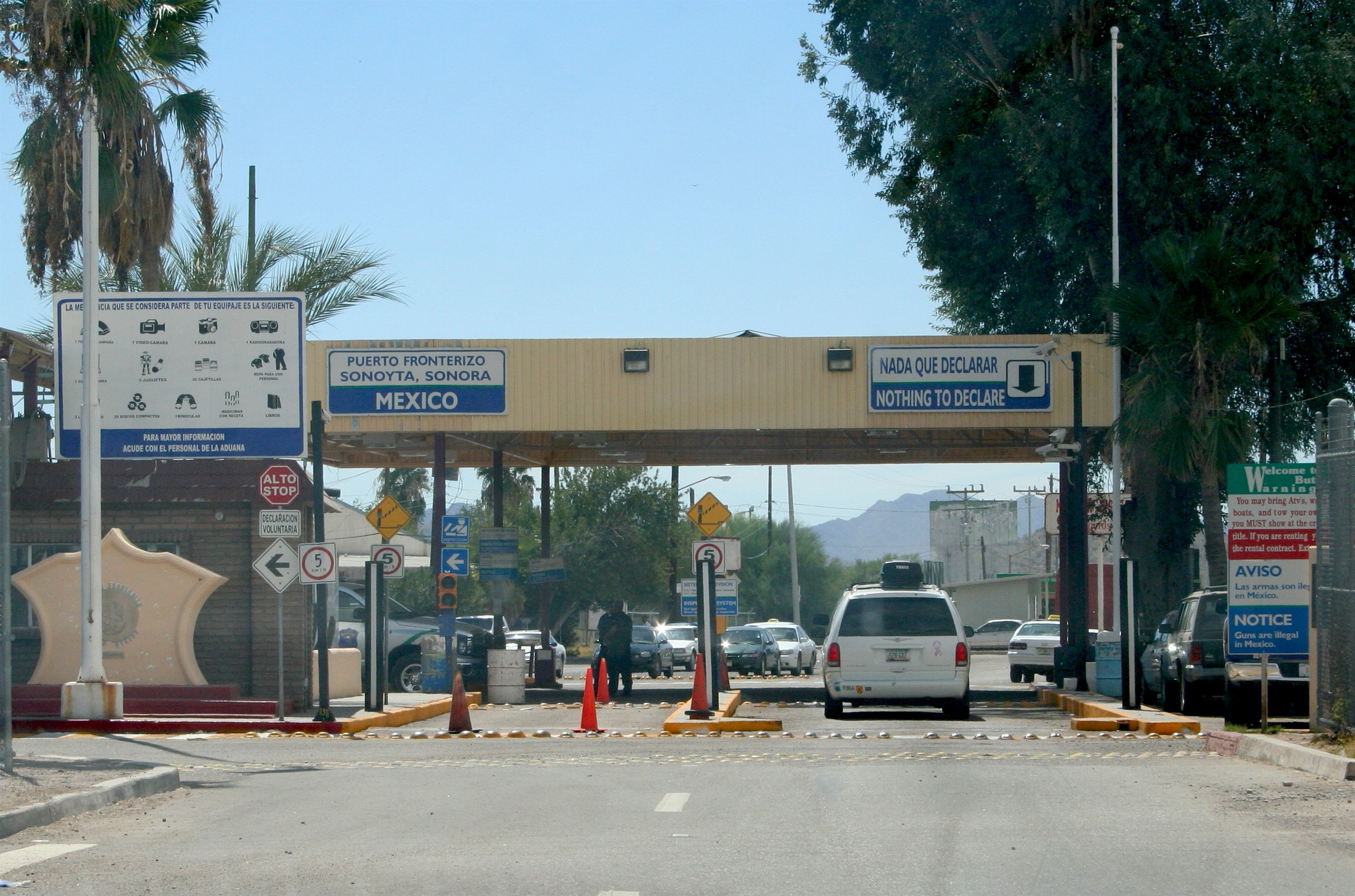
- Border crossing between Sonoyta and Lukeville, Arizona

- Location within Mexico
- Coordinates: 31°51′41″N 112°51′16″W
- Country: Mexico
- State: Sonora
- Municipality: Plutarco Elías Calles
- Founded: 1693 (San Marcelo de Sonoyta)
- Elevation: 400 m (1,300 ft)

Population (2010)
  - Total: 12,849
  - Demonym: Sonoitense
- Time zone: UTC–07:00 (Zona Pacífico)
- Postal code: 83570
- Area code: +52 651
- Website: www.sonora.gob.mx/portal/

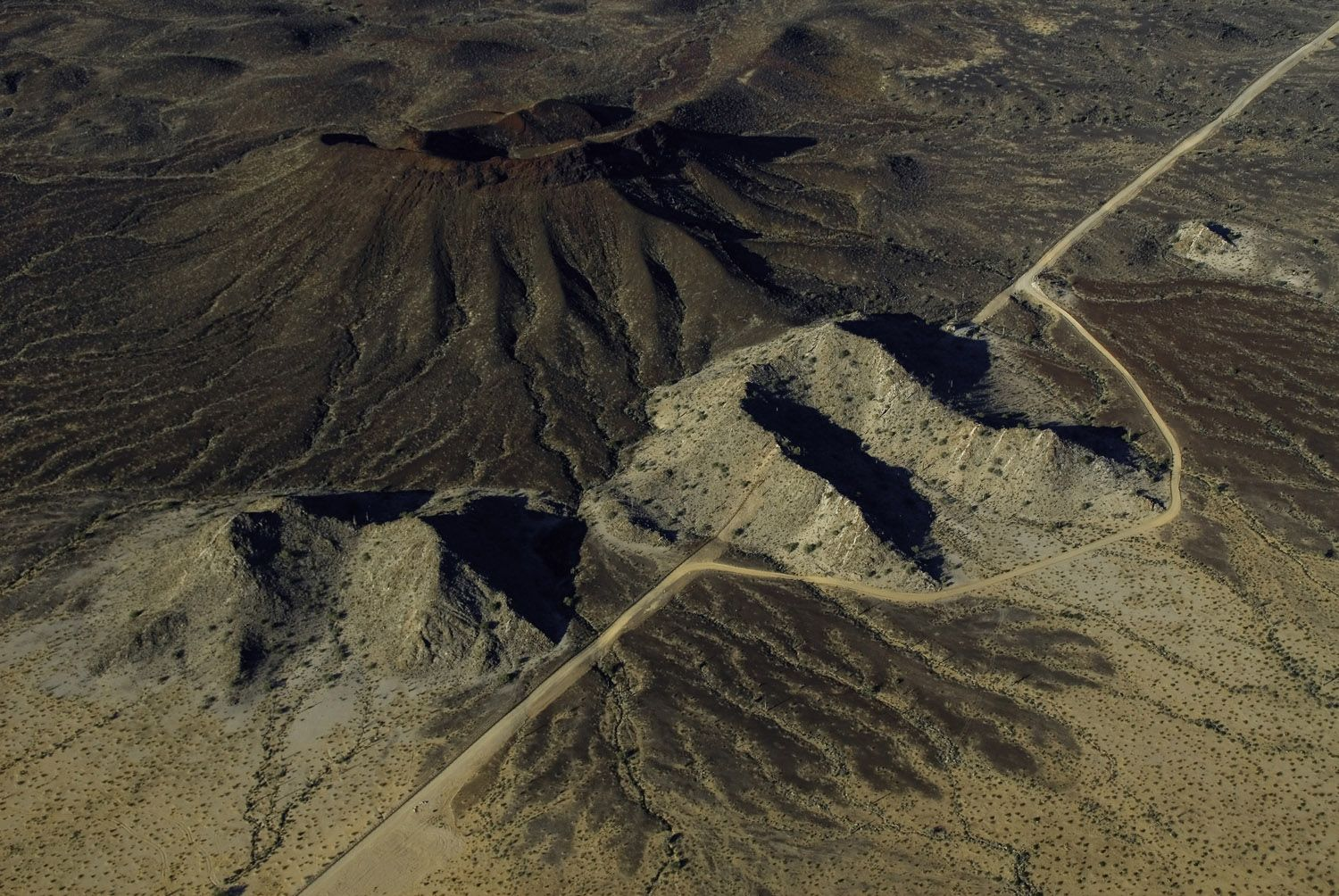
U.S.-Mexico border west of Sonoyta. Sonora is to the left (south).

Sonoyta, Sonora, is a town in the northern Mexican state of Sonora. It stands on the U.S.-Mexico border, facing Lukeville, Arizona, in the United States. It is the municipal seat of the municipality of Plutarco Elías Calles.

== Demographics ==
According to the 2010 census, the city had 12,849 inhabitants while the surrounding municipality had 15,652 inhabitants. There were 6,613 male inhabitants and 6,236 female. 96.1 percent of the population over five years of age are Roman Catholic, 3.0 percent are Evangelicals, and the remaining 0.9 percent belong to other religions.

== History ==
The first inhabitants of this region were the Tohono O'odham, who lived in the regions of Pinacate, Quitovac, and Sonoyta. The arrival of Jesuit missionaries to this zone changed their way of life. Therefore, compact communities were formed mainly on the banks of lakes and of the river. At the foothills of a spot known as Loma Alta, sprouted water from a fountain, called by the naturals Ṣon Oidag, O'odham for "base of the water".

Jesuit missionary Eusebio Kino founded the mission Nuestra Senora de Loreto y San Marcelo de Sonoyta in 1699, and built its first church in 1701. Enrique Ruhen, another missionary, rebuilt the church in 1751; it was destroyed the same year in the Pima Revolt, and Ruhen was killed.

In 1836 they discovered adjoining mines. Sonoyta was dependent to the municipality of the District of Altar during periods of the 19th century. After the Revolution it belonged to the municipality of Caborca, Sonora, through the Law No. 136 of July 9, 1952. Then it separated from the municipality of Caborca and belonged to the municipality of Puerto Peñasco, Sonora, until August 1989, when a new municipality was created and called General Plutarco Elías Calles, as a social, political, and historic need.

For a long time, the border crossing was very busy with imports/exports, but after an internal change to customs laws in Mexico, import/export business dwindled. This led to heavy migration to other cities during the late 1980s to mid-1990s.

== Education ==
The municipality has 10 preschools, 15 elementary schools, 5 junior high and high schools, 2 medium professional and 1 accredited college.

== Transportation ==
Sonoyta is situated at an important crossroads. Federal Highway 2, which runs parallel to the international border, crosses here. Federal Highway 8 leading from Lukeville, Arizona (U.S.-Mexico border of Sonoyta) to Puerto Peñasco, Sonora, also crosses the city. It is connected to the United States by the Lukeville Port of Entry.

== Present day ==
Sonoyta is well known as a crossing-point to the United States for undocumented migrants. Many immigrants use the town to make final preparations for a treacherous trek through the Sonoran Desert. On this long desert march, migrants often face death, especially during the summer season.

Conversely, the town is used as a crossover point for American tourists headed to Puerto Peñasco, Sonora, or other cities in Northern Mexico. Puerto Peñasco, a popular beach resort city, is located about 100 km (62 mi) southwest on Highway 8.

Sonoyta features many urban features, as well as a downtown with many small stores and markets. Services of major companies, such as Pemex, are available, and major airports are located in Mexicali, Baja California; Hermosillo, Sonora; Yuma, Arizona; Phoenix, Arizona; and Tucson, Arizona, all within five hours or less by car. Puerto Peñasco International Airport also serves Sonoyta residents since 2008, with flights to other points in Mexico.

The border between Sonoyta and Lukeville, Arizona, is open from 6:00 a.m. until 8:00pm MST.
