= Lukeville, Arizona =

Unincorporated town in the state of Arizona, United States

- Unincorporated town
- Location within the state of Arizona Lukeville (the United States)
- Coordinates: 31°52′57″N 112°48′57″W
- Country: United States
- State: Arizona
- County: Pima
- Elevation: 1,398 ft (426 m)
- Time zone: UTC-7 (Mountain (MST))
  - Summer (DST): UTC-7 (MST)
- ZIP code: 85341
- Area code: 520
- FIPS code: 04-42870
- GNIS feature ID: 7544

Lukeville is a small unincorporated town on the Mexico–United States border in southern Pima County, Arizona, United States. It was started by Charles Luke, brother of World War I aviator Frank Luke, an Arizona native who was awarded a posthumous Medal of Honor.

== Description ==
The community lies at Lukeville Port of Entry border crossing into Sonoyta, Sonora, Mexico. It is the terminus of State Route 85 and is located entirely within Organ Pipe Cactus National Monument. There is a stop-over spot for buses that are bound for Phoenix and Tucson along with a post office and a duty-free shop.

Its population was approximately 35 at the 2000 census, 27 (77%) of whom were Hispanic or Latino.

A project to replace portions of the Mexico–United States barrier in this area began in 2019.

Lukeville is not in a school district. The closest district is the Ajo Unified School District.

== Climate ==
This area has a large amount of sunshine year-round due to its stable descending air and high pressure. According to the Köppen Climate Classification system, Lukeville has a hot desert climate, abbreviated "BWh" on climate maps.

== Education ==
The Pima County School Superintendent arranges for education of K-12 students living in areas without school districts. It arranges for transportation to the Ajo Unified School District from the Lukeville area.

== See also ==
- Operation Diablo Express
