= Phoenix Bypass Route =

Highway bypass route in Arizona

Phoenix Bypass Route

Route information
- Maintained by Arizona Department of Transportation
- Component highways: I-8 from southeast of Casa Grande to Gila Bend SR 85 from Gila Bend to Buckeye

Major junctions
- Southeast end: I-10 southeast of Casa Grande
- I-8 in Gila Bend; SR 85 in Gila Bend
- Northwest end: I-10 in Buckeye

Location
- Country: United States
- State: Arizona
- Counties: Pinal, Maricopa

Highway system
- Arizona State Highway System; Interstate; US; State; Scenic Proposed; Former

The Phoenix Bypass Route is an informal designation for a highway combination in the U.S. state of Arizona that allows long-distance motorists to avoid traveling through the central Phoenix metropolitan area. The route consists of Interstate 8 (I-8) between Casa Grande and Gila Bend, and State Route 85 (SR 85) between Gila Bend and Buckeye, where it reconnects with Interstate 10 (I-10).

The combination of SR 85 between I-10 and I-8, together with I-8 between SR 85 and I-10 near Casa Grande, has been promoted as a bypass of the Phoenix area for long-distance travelers on I-10, particularly for traffic between southern California and Tucson or points farther east.

== Route description ==
=== Interstate 8 segment ===
The bypass begins at I-10 southeast of Casa Grande, where motorists exit onto I-8 westbound. I-8 is an east–west Interstate Highway running from San Diego to its eastern terminus at I-10 near Casa Grande. In Arizona, I-8 crosses the Sonoran Desert, passing near communities such as Stanfield and Dateland.

Approaching Gila Bend, I-8 maintains a generally northeastern heading before reaching its junction with SR 85. West of this interchange, I-8 continues toward Yuma and California; east of the Casa Grande area, it terminates at I-10.

=== State Route 85 segment ===
At Gila Bend, traffic leaves I-8 and proceeds north on SR 85. Within Gila Bend, SR 85 intersects the I-8 business loop and provides access to local facilities including Gila Bend Municipal Airport. The highway then turns northeast and continues toward the Phoenix metropolitan area.

North of Gila Bend, SR 85 runs near the western edge of the Sonoran Desert National Monument and provides access to Buckeye Hills Regional Park. This segment is part of the National Highway System. As it approaches Buckeye, SR 85 crosses the Gila River and the Buckeye Canal before reaching its northern terminus at Exit 112 on I-10.

== Function ==
The Phoenix Bypass Route is used primarily by:

- Westbound traffic from Tucson or eastern Arizona heading toward Yuma or San Diego.
- Eastbound traffic from southern California bound for Tucson, New Mexico, or Texas.
- Commercial freight traffic seeking to avoid congestion within central Phoenix.

By diverting at Casa Grande onto I-8 and reconnecting with I-10 at Buckeye via SR 85, motorists can circumvent urban traffic, construction zones, and peak-period congestion commonly experienced along I-10 through downtown Phoenix.

== Exit list ==
=== I-8 segment (Casa Grande to Gila bend) ===
County	Location	mi	km	Exit	Destinations	Notes
Maricopa	Gila Bend	115.68	186.17	115	BL 8 east (Historic US 80 east) / SR 85 – Phoenix, Ajo	Former US 80 east
Maricopa	Gila Bend			118	SR 85 north	Future interchange
Maricopa	Gila Bend	119.47	192.27	119	Butterfield Trail (BL 8 west) to SR 85 north / I-10	Former SR 84 west
Maricopa		140.86	226.69	140	Freeman Road	Access to Sonoran Desert National Monument
Maricopa		144.60	232.71	144	Vekol Valley Road	
Pinal		151.73	244.19	151	SR 84 east to SR 347 north – Maricopa	
Pinal		161.61	260.09	161	Stanfield	
Pinal		167.61	269.74	167	Montgomery Road	
Pinal		169.72	273.14	169	Bianco Road	
Pinal		172.62	277.80	172	Thornton Road – Casa Grande	
Pinal		174.62	281.02	174	Trekell Road – Casa Grande	
Pinal	Casa Grande	178.36	287.04	178	I-10 – Phoenix, Tucson	Signed as exits 178A (west) and 178B (east); additional entrance from Sunland Gin Road; exit 199 on I-10
1.000 mi = 1.609 km; 1.000 km = 0.621 mi: Incomplete access; Unopened

=== SR 85 segment (Gila Bend to Buckeye) ===
Exit numbers reflect mileposts on former US 80.

County	Location	mi	km	Exit	Destinations	Notes
Maricopa	Gila Bend	79.95	128.67		I-8 east – Tucson	Exit 115 on I-8
Maricopa	Gila Bend	80.53	129.60		BL 8 / Historic US 80 west (Pima Street) to I-8 west – San Diego	South end of concurrency with I-8 BL/Historic US 80; former US 80 west
Maricopa	Gila Bend				Historic US 80 east	North end of concurrency with Historic US 80; former US 80 east
Maricopa	Gila Bend	83.20	133.90		BL 8 east (Butterfield Trail) to I-8 east – Tucson	North end of concurrency with I-8 BL
Maricopa	Gila Bend	83.43– 83.95	134.27– 135.10		To SR 238 (Maricopa Road) – Maricopa	access to Sonoran Desert National Monument
Maricopa	Buckeye	101.23	162.91	138	Lewis Prison Road to Patterson Road	Interchange. Access to Arizona State Prison Complex – Lewis
Maricopa	Buckeye	112.36	180.83		Hazen Road (Historic US 80 west) – Palo Verde, Hassayampa, Arlington	South end of Historic US 80 concurrency
Maricopa	Buckeye	113.35	182.42		Historic US 80 east / MC 85 – Buckeye, Phoenix	North end of Historic US 80 concurrency; former US 80 east
Maricopa	Buckeye				SR 30 east (Tres Rios Freeway)	Future interchange
Maricopa	Buckeye	117.87	189.69		I-10 – Phoenix, Los Angeles	Northern terminus; exit 112 on I-10
1.000 mi = 1.609 km; 1.000 km = 0.621 mi: Concurrency terminus; Unopened

=== Planned Gila Bend-Buckeye realignment ===
County	Location	mi	km	Exit	Destinations	Notes
SR 85 continues south
Maricopa	Gila Bend	79.95 115.6	128.67 186.0	115	I-8 west	Mileposts reset to reflect mileage on former US 80; south end of concurrency with I-8; exit 116 on I-8; NB access via Old SR 85 and I-8 BL/Historic US 80 (Pima Street); south end of freeway segment
Maricopa	Gila Bend	118.0	189.9	118	I-8 east	Planned flyover interchange; north end of concurrency with I-8; future exit 118 on I-8
Maricopa	Gila Bend	121.0	194.7	121	To BL 8 / SR 238	Planned interchange
Maricopa		123.0	197.9	123	Watermelon Road	Planned interchange
Maricopa	Buckeye	138.2	222.4	138	Lewis Prison Road to Patterson Road	Interchange
Maricopa	Buckeye	149.0	239.8	149	SR 30 east (Tres Rios Freeway)	Future interchange
Maricopa	Buckeye	150.4	242.0	150	Historic US 80 east / MC 85 – Buckeye, Phoenix	Former US 80 east; future interchange
Maricopa	Buckeye	152.0	244.6	152	Southern Avenue	Future interchange
Maricopa	Buckeye	153.0	246.2	153	Broadway Road	Future interchange
Maricopa	Buckeye	154.0	247.8	154	I-10 – Phoenix, Los Angeles	Northern terminus; exit 112 on I-10
1.000 mi = 1.609 km; 1.000 km = 0.621 mi: Concurrency terminus; Unopened

== See also ==
- Interstate 8 in Arizona
- Arizona State Route 85
- Interstate 10 in Arizona
- Phoenix metropolitan area
