= Hurricane Sergio (2018) =

Category 4 Pacific hurricane

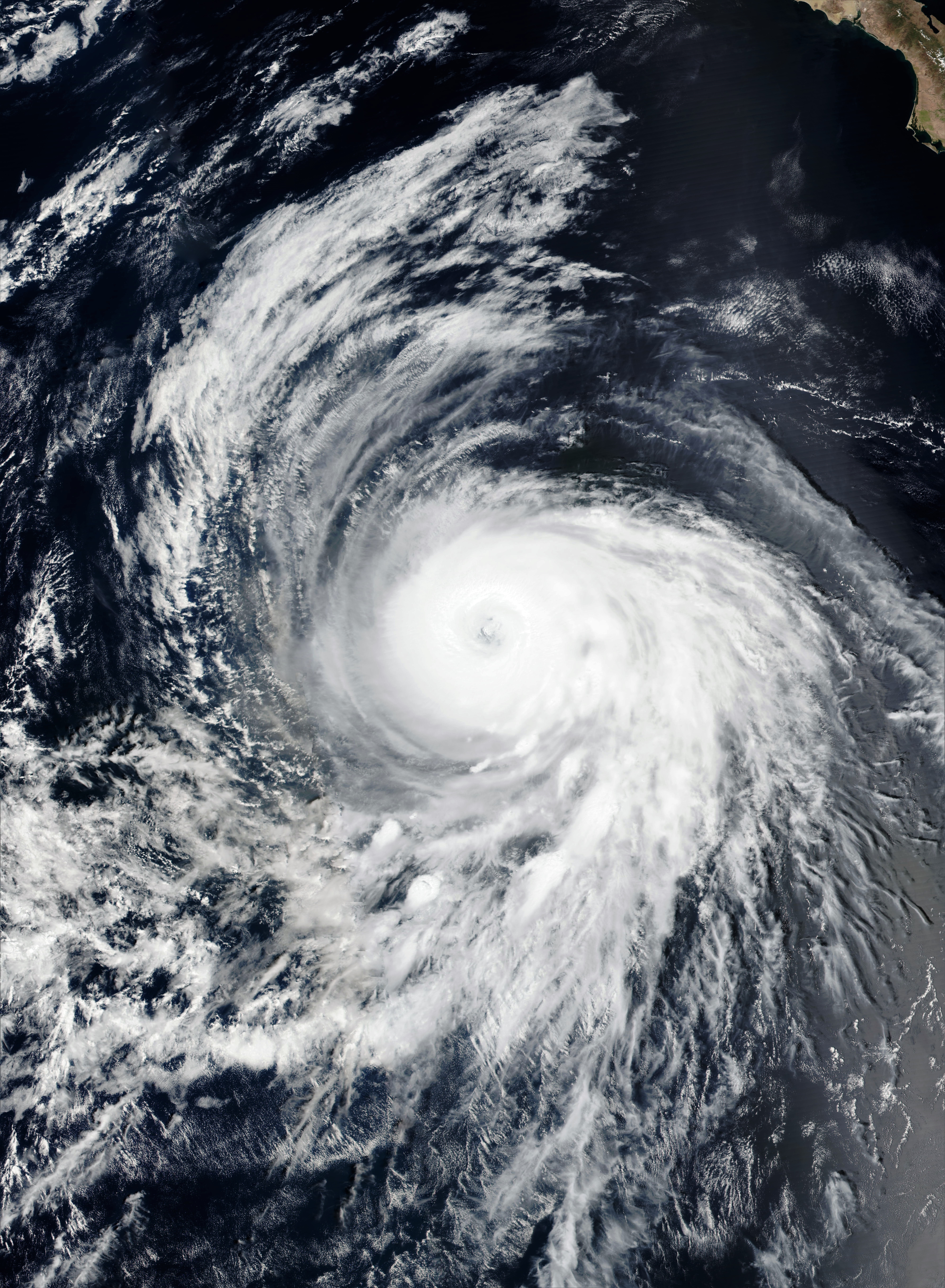
- Hurricane Sergio shortly after peak intensity on October 4

Meteorological history
- Formed: September 29, 2018
- Dissipated: October 13, 2018

Category 4 major hurricane
- 1-minute sustained (SSHWS/NWS)
- Highest winds: 140 mph (220 km/h)
- Lowest pressure: 942 mbar (hPa); 27.82 inHg

Overall effects
- Fatalities: None
- Damage: $1.34 million (2018 USD)
- Areas affected: Baja California Peninsula, Northwestern Mexico, Southwestern United States, Texas
- IBTrACS /
- Part of the 2018 Pacific hurricane season

Hurricane Sergio was a powerful and long-lived tropical cyclone that affected the Baja California Peninsula as a tropical storm and caused significant flooding throughout South Texas in early October 2018. Sergio became the eighth Category 4 hurricane in the East Pacific for 2018, breaking the old record of seven set in 2015. It was the twentieth named storm, eleventh hurricane, and ninth major hurricane of the season. (Note: A major hurricane is one that ranks at Category 3 or higher on the Saffir–Simpson scale.)

The storm originated from a disturbance located over northwestern South America on September 24. The National Hurricane Center monitored the disturbance for several days as the system organized into a tropical storm on September 29. Sergio gradually strengthened for the next couple of days as it traveled west-southwestward, becoming a hurricane on October 2. The storm then turned towards the northwest as it underwent rapid intensification and an eyewall replacement cycle, before peaking as a Category 4 hurricane on October 4, with maximum sustained winds of 140 mph (230 km/h). The hurricane maintained peak intensity for 12 hours before undergoing a second eyewall replacement and turning towards the southwest. The system then began another period of intensification, achieving a secondary peak with winds of 125 mph (201 km/h) on October 6. The next day, Sergio began a third eyewall replacement cycle, falling below major hurricane strength. At the same time, the system unexpectedly assumed some annular characteristics. Over the next few days, the cyclone curved from the southwest to the northeast, weakening into a tropical storm on October 9. Sergio made landfall as a tropical storm on October 12 on the Baja California Peninsula, and later in northwestern Mexico as a tropical depression before dissipating early on October 13.

Sergio's approach warranted the issuance of tropical storm watches and warnings along the western and eastern coasts of Baja California from October 10–11. The cyclone made landfall in western Baja California Sur and Sonora on October 13 as a tropical storm and tropical depression, respectively, causing around US$691,000 (Note: All currencies are in their 2018 values and are converted to United States dollars using data from the International Monetary Fund published by the World Bank.)in damage, over a thousand school closures, and a few hundred evacuations due to severe flooding. Sergio's remnants brought heavy rainfall to Arizona, resulting in the closure of its state fair. Multiple tornadoes also spawned in Texas as a result of the increased moisture. About US$648,000 in damage occurred throughout both states. No injuries or deaths were reported in association with the hurricane or its remnants.

== Meteorological history ==
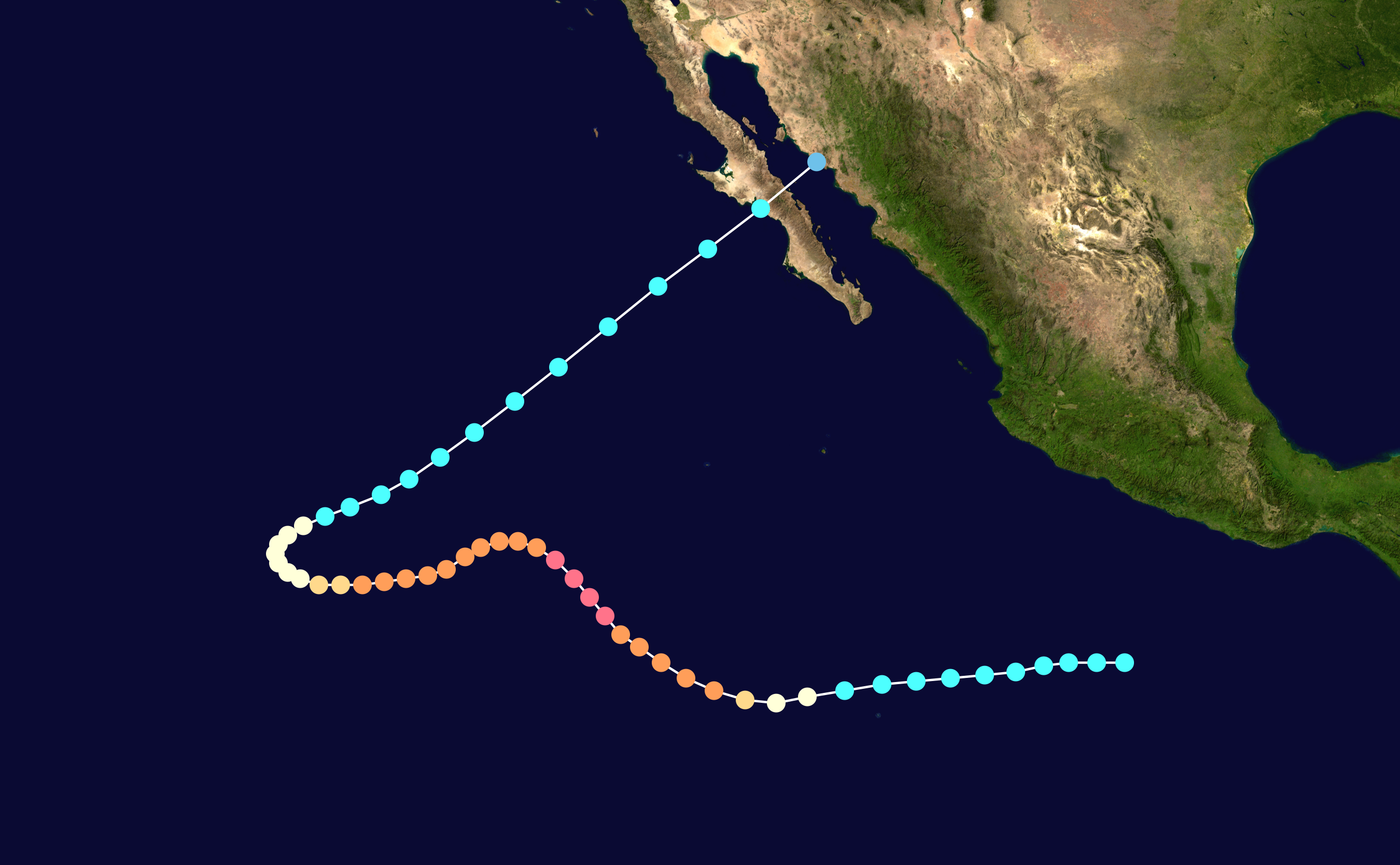
Map plotting the storm's track and intensity, according to the Saffir–Simpson scale Map key Saffir–Simpson scale Tropical depression (≤38 mph, ≤62 km/h) Tropical storm (39–73 mph, 63–118 km/h) Category 1 (74–95 mph, 119–153 km/h) Category 2 (96–110 mph, 154–177 km/h) Category 3 (111–129 mph, 178–208 km/h) Category 4 (130–156 mph, 209–251 km/h) Category 5 (≥157 mph, ≥252 km/h) Unknown Storm type Tropical cyclone Subtropical cyclone Extratropical cyclone, remnant low, tropical disturbance, or monsoon depression

The origins of Hurricane Sergio can be traced to a weather system that was located over northwestern South America on September 24. Although uncertain, there is a possibility that Sergio arose from a tropical wave that departed from the west coast of Africa on September 13. The National Hurricane Center (NHC) forecast on September 25 that a low-pressure area would form a few hundred miles south of the Gulf of Tehuantepec in about two days. A low-pressure system materialized a few hundred miles south-southeast of Mexico's southern coast around 12:00 UTC on September 26. The NHC continued to track the disturbance for a few more days as the system traveled west-northwest, before it developed into Tropical Storm Sergio on September 29 at 12:00 UTC, while approximately 385 mi (620 km) south of Zihuatanejo, Mexico. Unlike most other tropical cyclones, Sergio did not possess an inner wind core. Instead, the maximum sustained winds were located in a rainband approximately 125 mi (201 km) east of the center.

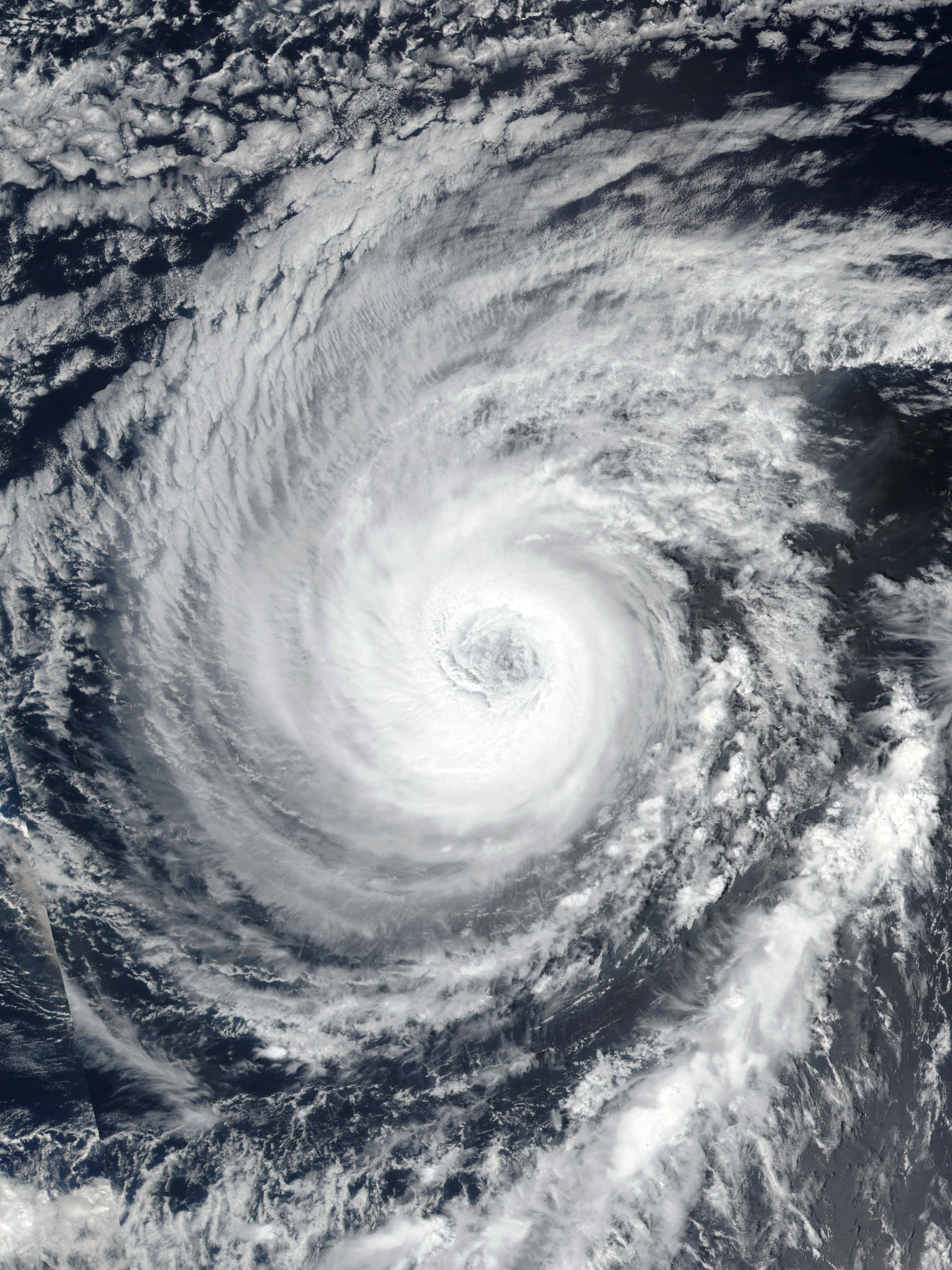
Hurricane Sergio acquiring annular characteristics on October 7

Despite being located within a favorable environment of warm sea surface temperatures and low wind shear, Sergio only gradually intensified over the next couple of days, the system becoming a Category 1 hurricane on October 2 at 00:00 UTC. Meanwhile, the storm tracked just south of west as a mid-level ridge developed to the north. At that point, the storm had developed a well-defined eye surrounded by −85 °C (−121 °F) clouds. The hurricane then began a period of rapid intensification, reaching Category 3 major hurricane status by 18:00 UTC. The wind speed then leveled off for about 18 hours as the system underwent an eyewall replacement cycle. At the same time, the mid-level ridge had weakened, resulting in the storm traveling to the northwest. Sergio then began another period of intensification, becoming the eighth Category 4 hurricane of the season on October 4 at 00:00 UTC, breaking the old record of seven set in 2015. Six hours later, the system peaked with maximum sustained winds of 140 mph (230 km/h) and a minimum central pressure of 942 mbar (27.8 inHg), while located about 825 mi (1,328 km) southwest of Cabo San Lucas. The storm maintained peak intensity for 12 hours before weakening due to another eyewall replacement cycle. As a result, its structure deteriorated, the eye fading and the surrounding cloud tops warming. A faraway mid-latitude ridge caused Sergio to turn towards the southwest from October 5–6.

After bottoming out as a low-end Category 3 hurricane on October 5 at 06:00 UTC, Sergio began to intensify once more, reaching a secondary peak with winds of 125 mph (201 km/h) on October 6 at 00:00 UTC. After maintaining its intensity for 18 hours, the hurricane began to weaken around 00:00 UTC on October 7 due to upwelling and a third eyewall replacement cycle. Soon after, Sergio began another turn, rotating from the southwest to the northeast over the next few days due to the influence of a mid-latitude trough. It unexpectedly acquired some annular characteristics early on October 7, with the eye having doubled in size while most of the banding features disappeared. The system gradually weakened over the next two days, falling to tropical storm status on October 9 at 18:00 UTC, due to cooling sea surface temperatures. Sergio made landfall near Los Castros, Baja California Sur, around 12:00 UTC on October 12, as a 50 mph (80 km/h) tropical storm. After crossing over the Baja California Peninsula and traversing the Gulf of California, the storm made a second landfall near Guaymas, Sonora, as a tropical depression around 18:00 UTC, before dissipating over northwest Mexico around midnight. Its remnants continued northeastward, causing heavy rainfall and tornadoes in the United States.

Sergio's slow movement speed and large size resulted in the ocean cooling 4.5–9.4 °F (−15.3 – −12.6 °C) as a result of its passage. Rainfall from Sergio was discovered to contain 11.8% less Oxygen-18 than expected of convective-based storms across the Sonora River Basin.

== Preparations and impact ==
=== Mexico ===
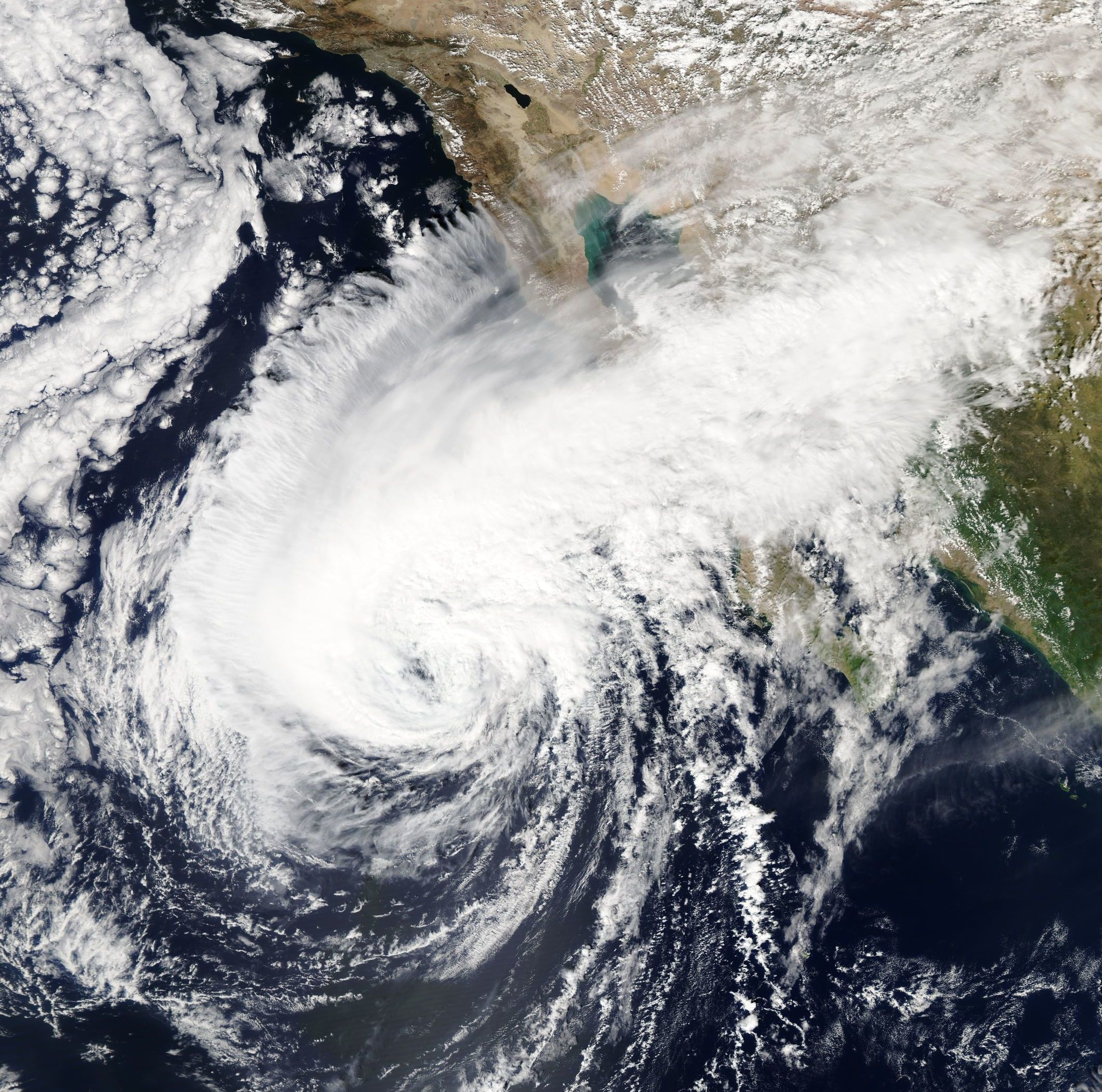
Tropical Storm Sergio approaching the Baja California Peninsula on October 11

The Government of Mexico issued a tropical storm watch on October 10 along the western coast of the Baja California Peninsula from Punta Eugenia to Cabo San Lázaro and along the eastern coast from Bahia San Juan Bautista to San Evaristo. As Sergio rapidly approached the peninsula on the next day, the tropical storm watch on the west coast was upgraded to a tropical storm warning, while the watches on the east coast were upgraded to warnings later in the day. All watches and warnings were discontinued as Sergio moved inland. Civil protection agencies in Baja California, Baja California Sur, and Sonora issued yellow alerts, indicative of moderate danger, in anticipation of severe weather conditions. Several municipalities around the landfall area in Sonora had orange alerts, which signaled high danger. Plan DN-III-E and the Marine Plan were activated in advance for Baja California Sur, allowing the Mexican Army to help with disaster relief efforts and rescue operations. A blue alert, meaning minimal danger, was issued for Sinaloa and emergency shelters were opened due to rainfall and Sergio's proximity.

Sergio made landfall in western Baja California Sur and later in Sonora, bringing heavy rains and strong winds to northern Mexico. In Baja California Sur, Sergio's impact was mainly minimal, with homes experiencing power outages and roof damage. Multiple roads and schools in Loreto were damaged. Damage across the Baja California Sur amounted to MX$13.3 million (US$691,000). In Sonora, almost 400 people had to evacuate to a temporary shelter as a result of flooding. Strong winds up to 70 km/h (43 mph) downed trees, utility poles, and damaged homes and businesses in Guaymas, the city council requested MX$40 million (US$2.08 million) to repair the damage caused by Sergio as well as several power outages. Hermosillo experienced street flooding which impeded traffic and overflowed sewers in several areas; multiple power outages also occurred. A concert scheduled to take place in the city was canceled in the interest of public safety. In Punta de Aqua II, over 5.05 in (128 mm) of rain was reported. Mazatán and Plutarco Elías Calles reported rainfall totals of 4.59 in (117 mm) and 4.53 in (115 mm), respectively. The Puerto Peñasco Municipality was impacted, causing flood damage to houses in the region. More than 1,000 schools were closed in Chihuahua and classes in 72 municipalities of Sinaloa were suspended. In the Chihuahuan municipality of Nuevo Casas Grandes, heavy rainfall flooded streets and houses. Throughout the state of Michoacán, the combined effects from Sergio and nearby Hurricane Rosa destroyed 86,000 acres (35,000 ha) of crops.

=== United States ===
High waves from Sergio affected Hawaii and its remnants moved into Arizona, California and Texas, generating heavy rains and spawning multiple tornadoes. Sergio produced 10–15 feet (3.0–4.6 m) waves and rip currents along the shores of Hawaii's Big Island, Maui, Molokai, and Oahu on October 10. As a result, high surf advisories were issued for east-facing shores. These swells gradually relaxed over the next couple of days. No injuries or damage was reported in Hawaii.

In Arizona, a Pacific upper-level low and remnant moisture from Sergio led to heavy rainfall; some areas in Phoenix recorded rainfall totals of 3 in (80 mm) and ankle-deep flooding. The Arizona State Fair was closed for the first time in "recent memory" due to flooding. Damage on the fairgrounds and to the surrounding roads was estimated at US$50,000. A portion of Old U.S. Route 80 was closed between Gila Bend and Buckeye after rainfall exceeding 1 in (25 mm) per hour caused flooding in the area. Moderate to heavy rainfall in the deserts southeast of Phoenix caused flash flooding, halting traffic on State Route 187 between state routes 87 and 387. Runoff from heavy rainfall in the Maricopa Mountains flowed across State Route 238, resulting in multiple closures from Mobile to Bosque and US$2,000 in damage. Numerous other road closures occurred throughout the Phoenix Metropolitan Area as a result of flash floods, damage in the region totaling approximately US$73,000. Moisture from Sergio's remnants also entered Southern California, producing thunderstorms mainly to the south of Point Conception. Widespread storms caused flash floods throughout the Coachella Valley, with a 12-hour rainfall total of 0.72 in (18 mm) observed at Palm Desert. In nearby Indio, hail up to 1 in (25 mm) in diameter was reported. Floodwaters up to 1.5 ft (0.46 m) deep were reported on a segment of Interstate 10 near Cactus City. Multiple flood-related road closures also occurred near Rimlon and Thousand Palms. Total damage in California is estimated at $100,000.

The remnants of Sergio moved through Texas from October 12–13, producing severe thunderstorms that caused US$475,000 in damage throughout the state. About US$15,000 in damage was reported after 69 mph (111 km/h) wind gusts damaged a storage unit between Eureka and Mildred. Wind gusts of 75 mph (121 km/h) caused about US$4,000 in damage to power lines and a carport near Greenwood. Outside of Shiloh, 75 mph (121 km/h) wind gusts destroyed a metal barn and either damaged or destroyed multiple trees, resulting in US$5,000 in damage. Wind gusts between 65–70 mph (105–113 km/h) were reported (Note: No significant damage was reported.) in numerous other counties. There were also reports of hail in several counties. Just outside Baxter, hail 1.5 in (38 mm) in diameter fell on several properties, causing US$5,000 in damage. Flash flooding affected the state, resulting in multiple road closures. In Wink, the intersection of State Highway 115 and Wildcat Drive was closed due to flooding. Outside of Midland, State Highway 158 experienced flooding near Interstate 20.

At least ten tornadoes spawned in Texas as a result of the increased moisture. An EF2 tornado near Knickerbocker extensively damaged a metal building and either uprooted or snapped many trees, causing US$200,000 in damage. In Brady, an EF0 tornado uprooted one tree, which caused another to fall on a home, which triggered roof damage, resulting in US$150,000 in damage. Approximately US$25,000 in damage occurred near Sardis when an EF0 tornado damaged a corner of a gymnasium, broke out windows on cars, bent down light-poles and handicap signs in a parking lot, and threw a trailer into a nearby field. Two tornadoes occurred near Chat. The first was an EF0 tornado that damaged a few trees as well as shingles and fences at multiple homes, generating US$15,000 in damage. The second was an EF1 tornado that substantially damaged one home, damaged the roof and deck of another, destroyed a shed, and tossed a boat and RV trailer, resulting in about US$50,000 in damage. An EF0 tornado near Brandon caused about US$5,000 in tree damage. At least four more EF0 tornadoes occurred: two in Navarro County, one in Freestone County, and one in Panola County.

== See also ==
- Weather of 2018
- Tropical cyclones in 2018
- List of Category 4 Pacific hurricanes
- Other tropical cyclones named Sergio
- List of California hurricanes
- List of Arizona hurricanes
- Hurricane Raymond (1989) – A Category 4 hurricane that impacted the same area, resulting in one death and over a million dollars (USD) in damage.
- Hurricane Javier (2004) – A Category 4 hurricane that made landfall in the same area, causing minimal damage.
- Hurricane Rosa (2018) – A long-lived Category 4 hurricane that took a similar path, made landfall in Baja California as a tropical depression.
