= Arizona State Route 347 =

State highway in Arizona, United States

State Route 347
- SR 347 highlighted in red

Route information
- Maintained by ADOT and the City of Maricopa
- Length: 28.69 mi (46.17 km)
- Existed: 1997–present

Major junctions
- South end: SR 84 near Stanfield
- SR 238 in Maricopa
- North end: I-10 near Sun Lakes

Location
- Country: United States
- State: Arizona
- Counties: Pinal, Maricopa

Highway system
- Arizona State Highway System; Interstate; US; State; Scenic Proposed; Former
← Loop 303	→ SR 360

State Route 347 (SR 347) is a 28.69-mile (46.17 km) long, north–south state highway in central Arizona. The route begins at SR 84 and heads north. It passes through Maricopa, meeting SR 238. The route ends at an interchange with Interstate 10 (I-10) south of Chandler. It primarily serves as the major road to Maricopa; much of the road lies within the Gila River Indian Community, with another short stretch through the Ak-Chin Indian Community. The road was built in the late 1930s and established as a state highway in the 1990s. Most of it is also known as the John Wayne Parkway. On average, between 4,000 and 35,000 vehicles use the roadway daily.

== Route description ==
The route begins at an intersection with SR 84 west of Stanfield. SR 347 then heads northward as John Wayne Parkway, a four-lane divided highway, through a desert landscape. After intersecting Meadowview Road and crossing a canal, SR 347 meets Carefree Place, where a farm appears to the west part of the road. At Clayton Road, the east side of the road becomes farmland as well. John Wayne Parkway becomes Maricopa Road at Emerald Road and serves as the southwestern boundary of the Ak-Chin Indian Community between Emerald Road and Peters and Nall Road. At Peters and Nall Road it enters the reservation for one mile (1.6 km) before become the dividing line at Steen Road between the Maricopa proper to the east and Ak-Chin to the west. Harrah's Ak-Chin Casino and Ak-Chin Circle Entertainment Center sit on the southwest corner of BIA Route 14 (also known as Farrell Road) and John Wayne Parkway within the community. Route 14 ends at SR 347 but continues west as Farrell Road within the Maricopa city limits. It is also at this point that road changes names back to John Wayne Parkway. The southernmost subdivision in Maricopa—Palo Brea—appears on the east side while the west side is a residential neighborhood on the reservation. Continuing on its northerly path, the road fully enters Maricopa past Palo Brea where another subdivision appears to the highway's west and the Copper Sky Recreational Complex appears on the east. Past Bowlin Road, subdivisions continue to dot the landscape with empty land near the highway zoned for future commercial use. The road then intersects Alterra Parkway/Desert Cedars Drive and Honeycutt Avenue before crossing a Union Pacific (UP) railroad on an overpass.

North of this overpass, SR 347 continues into the city's Heritage District, where some of the city's oldest homes and properties are located. It first intersects Honeycutt Road before having a partial interchange with Maricopa-Casa Grande Highway. North of the road's intersection with Edison Road, SR 347 enters a major commercial area where several businesses are located. SR 347 then serves as the eastern terminus for SR 238 also known as Mobile Road, which continues as Smith-Enke Road, a major east–west corridor for Maricopa. The route then separates two major housing subdivisions before abruptly entering the Gila River Indian Community and empty desert. Here, the road drops its John Wayne Parkway name and returns to Maricopa Road. The road turns more northeasterly, and serves as the western terminus for Casa Blanca Road. Turning back north and slightly northeast again, the road crosses from Pinal County into Maricopa County. After intersecting Riggs Road, Maricopa Road continues northeast to serve the Wild Horse Pass Casino while SR 347 bends directly east, becoming Queen Creek Road. SR 347 ends at a diamond interchange at I-10 (Exit 164), while Queen Creek Road continues east through the Gila River Indian Reservation towards Chandler and the Chandler Municipal Airport.

The route is maintained by the Arizona Department of Transportation (ADOT), which is responsible for maintaining highways in the state. As part of this role, the department periodically conducts surveys to measure traffic on highways in Arizona. These surveys are most often presented in the form of average annual daily traffic (AADT), which is the number of vehicles that use a highway on any average day during the year. In 2009, ADOT calculated that around 4,500 vehicles used the road daily near the SR 84 intersection and about 33,000 vehicles used the route near the I-10 interchange on an average day. A 2018 report said traffic was 31,000 vehicles daily within Maricopa. The ADOT Traffic Monitoring Group calculated an AADT of 42,939 cars in 2018, and calculated an AADT estimate of 71,978 cars in 2040 for a portion of this road. In 2012, SR 347 from Farrell Road in Maricopa north to I-10 was added to the National Highway System, a system of roads in the United States important to the nation's economy, defense, and mobility.

== History ==
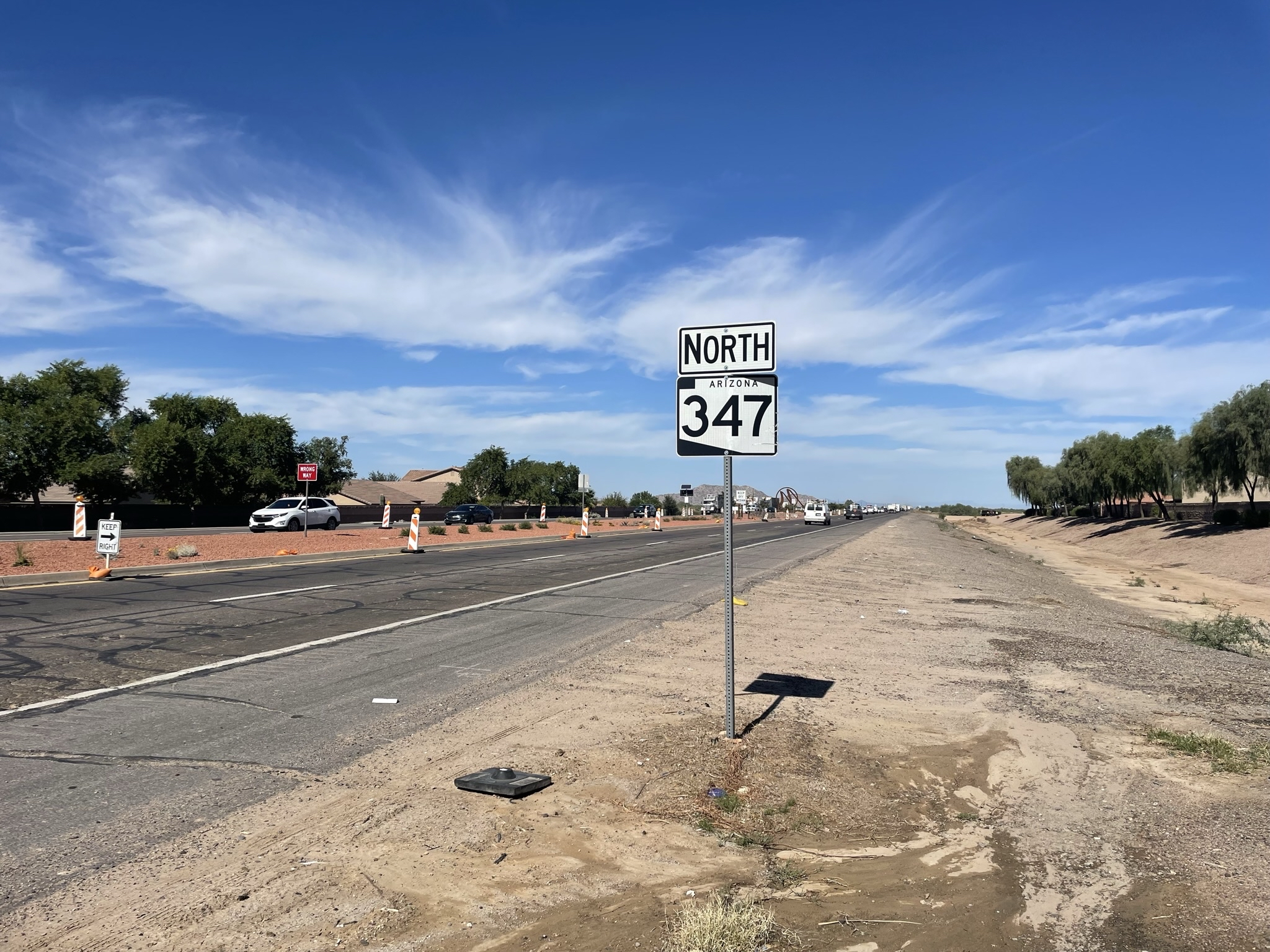
Arizona Route 347 North Marker

The section north of Maricopa, toward present day I-10, was built by 1939. It was built upon the old Phoenix-Maricopa Railroad right of way after service was discontinued. The road headed north toward Tempe to U.S. Route 80. Between 1951 and 1958, the road was extended south to its current terminus at SR 84; at this time, I-10 had still not been built, nor had the route become a state highway. By 1971, I-10 was finished through the south and east edges of the Phoenix area. In 1989, ADOT made preparations to establish the number along Maricopa Road and reserved the right-of-way along the parkway. This may have been because of a controversy over the name of John Wayne Parkway, which the road was dubbed at the time. The Gila River Native Americans, whose reservation the parkway ran on, did not want this name, as John Wayne, the actor who formerly owned a ranch in modern Maricopa, had appeared in several movies in which he had killed Native Americans. Maricopa Road was widened from two lanes to four in the early 1990s, and was also realigned to use Queen Creek Road to meet I-10. In 1997, the route was officially established as a state highway with its current routing.

In Maricopa, north of the road's intersection with Alterra Parkway/Desert Cedars Drive, the road previously ran alongside Maricopa High School to the west, having a railroad crossing on the UP line, and then having an at-grade intersection with Maricopa-Casa Grande Highway. This railroad crossing caused traffic to stop for passing trains more than sixty times per day. A project to reroute the road slightly east over a new six-lane overpass began in 2018. The city of Maricopa hosted a ribbon-cutting ceremony for the new overpass on July 13, 2019, and it was opened to traffic on July 15, 2019. Funding of $15 million for the project was provided by the federal government's Transportation Investment Generating Economic Recovery program, and $14 million by the Maricopa government.

== Major intersections ==
County	Location	mi	km	Destinations	Notes
Pinal		0.00	0.00	SR 84 – Stanfield, Casa Grande, Gila Bend, Yuma	Southern terminus
Pinal	Maricopa	12.58	20.25	Maricopa-Casa Grande Highway	Partial interchange; southbound entrance and exit only; northbound access via Honeycutt Road
Pinal	Maricopa	13.68	22.02	SR 238 west – Mobile	Eastern terminus of SR 238
Pinal	Maricopa	13.79	22.19	North end state maintenance	
Pinal	Gila River Indian Community	14.77	23.77	South end state maintenance	
Pinal	Gila River Indian Community	21.61	34.78	Mammoth Way	Proposed interchange
Maricopa	Gila River Indian Community	24.41	39.28	Riggs Road	Proposed interchange
Maricopa	Gila River Indian Community	28.69	46.17	I-10 – Phoenix, Tucson	Northern terminus; I-10 exit 164
Maricopa	Gila River Indian Community	28.69	46.17	Queen Creek Road east – Chandler Municipal Airport	Continuation beyond I-10
1.000 mi = 1.609 km; 1.000 km = 0.621 mi: Proposed
