= Robert Miguel =

American politician

Chairman of the Ak-Chin Indian Community
- Incumbent
- Assumed office 2016
- Vice President: Lemuel Vincent

Personal details
- Born: Arizona, U.S.
- Spouse: Connie Miguel
- Children: 5
- Occupation: Photojournalist
- Profession: Politician

Robert Miguel is a Native American politician. He has served as the Chairman of the Ak-Chin Indian Community since 2016.

== Early life ==
Robert Miguel was raised on the Ak-Chin Indian Community reservation in Maricopa, Arizona. His mother, Janice Miguel, had Robert when she was a teenager. His father is of Mexican descent. Miguel's mother had three additional children, three brothers, two of died in adulthood. His grandparents, Matilda and Jonas Miguel, were his primary caregivers. Jonas Miguel served as Chair of the Ak-Chin Indian Community when Miguel was a boy. He did not know his father, Robert Villarreal, until Miguel was seventeen. After meeting Villarreal, Miguel learned he had three half-siblings, two sisters and a brother.

As a child, Miguel lived in an adobe house. He was also raised speaking the Oʼodham language with English being his second language.

Miguel played baseball as a teen, an activity he credits with helping him avoid drug and alcohol use. He played with his brother Norbert. Their team traveled across the region to play against other Indian tribes. He played the sport well and tried out for the Chicago Cubs and Cincinnati Reds.

== Career ==
After graduating high school, Miguel worked for the Ak-Chin Indian Community. He worked for the tribal newspaper, the Ak-Chin O'odham Runner as a photojournalist. He also served on various community boards. He decided to run for the Community Council, inspired by his grandfather.

=== Community Council ===
He was elected chairman in 2016, he is focused on wellness and recreation for Community members, including those with special needs. He also supports increased use of Ak-Chin Indian Community traditional culture. He also supports bringing events like the Super Bowl and the Phoenix Open to the state, which he believes can benefit the tribe financially through their casino. In 2022, the tribe joined Avnet and the Gila River Indian Community as partners on the Arizona Super Bowl Host Committee for the 2023 Super Bowl.

As of 2020, Miguel is the chair of the Arizona Tribal Governments for Gaming, a board member of the Native American Rights Fund and vice president of the Inter-Tribal Council of Arizona.

== Personal life ==
Miguel is married to a woman named Connie. Together, they have seven children.
