= Table Top Mountain (Arizona) =

Summit and wilderness area in Pinal County, Arizona

Table Top Wilderness
- IUCN category Ib (wilderness area)
- Location within the United States
- Location: Pinal County, Arizona, US
- Nearest town: Maricopa, AZ
- Coordinates: 32°46′09″N 112°08′32″W
- Area: 34,400 acres (139 km^{2})
- Established: 1990
- Governing body: U.S. Department of Interior Bureau of Land Management

Table Top Wilderness is a protected wilderness area centered around its namesake Table Top Mountain, a summit of 4,373 feet (1332 m) in the Table Top Mountains in the U.S. state of Arizona. Established in 1990 under the Arizona Desert Wilderness Act the area is managed by the Bureau of Land Management. It is located in the Sonoran Desert National Monument south of Interstate 8 between the towns of Casa Grande and Gila Bend. The flat-topped mesa rises from the desert floor in Vekol Valley to the east surrounded by smaller canyons and desert washes with views of the desert plain in all directions. There are two established trails in the wilderness area, one of which leads to the summit.

The region consists of a typical Sonoran Desert landscape with vegetation that includes saguaro cactus, palo verde, ironwood tree, bursage, and creosote bush.

== See also ==
- List of Arizona Wilderness Areas
- List of U.S. Wilderness Areas
