= Jacob Cowing =

American football player (born 2001)

No. 4 – San Francisco 49ers
- Positions: Wide receiver, punt returner
- Roster status: Active

Personal information
- Born: February 4, 2001 (age 25); Phoenix, Arizona, U.S.
- Listed height: 5 ft 9 in (1.75 m)
- Listed weight: 171 lb (78 kg)

Career information
- High school: Maricopa (Maricopa, Arizona)
- College: UTEP (2019–2021); Arizona (2022–2023)
- NFL draft: 2024: 4th round, 135th overall pick

Career history
- San Francisco 49ers (2024–present)

Awards and highlights
- First-team All-CUSA (2021); Second-team All-CUSA (2020)

Career NFL statistics as of Week 9, 2026
- Receptions: 9
- Receiving yards: 132
- Rushing yards: 19
- Return yards: 429
- Stats at Pro Football Reference

Jacob Henry Cowing (born February 4, 2001) is an American professional football wide receiver and punt returner for the San Francisco 49ers of the National Football League (NFL). He played college football for the UTEP Miners and Arizona Wildcats and was selected by the 49ers in the fourth round of the 2024 NFL draft.

== Early life ==
Jacob Cowing grew up in Maricopa, Arizona, and attended Maricopa High School. As a senior, he had 28 receptions for 872 yards and 10 touchdowns. Cowing committed to play college football at UTEP, which was his only Division I FBS offer.

== College career ==
=== UTEP ===
Cowing became a starter at UTEP as a wide receiver during his freshman season in 2019 and caught 31 passes with a team-leading 550 receiving yards and three touchdown receptions. In his sophomore year, he started all eight games and was named second team All-Conference USA after leading the Miners with 41 receptions for 691 yards and three touchdowns. As a junior in 2021, Cowing was named first team All-Conference USA after starting all 13 games for the Miners and catching 69 passes for 1,354 yards and seven touchdowns, as well as completing four carries for 75 yards and a touchdown. After the season, he entered the NCAA transfer portal.

=== Arizona ===
Cowing ultimately transferred to Arizona. He was named to the watchlist for the Fred Biletnikoff Award entering his first season at Arizona. His week one debut as a Wildcat featured three reception touchdowns and 152 receiving yards in a win over San Diego State. In another win over the Colorado Buffaloes, he scored one touchdown and completed 12 passes for 180 receiving yards, his college record. After starting all 12 games, Cowing finished his senior year with 85 receptions for 1,034 yards and seven touchdowns, as well as three rushing attempts for one yard. He also completed seven punt returns for 56 yards. Leading the conference in receptions, he received the All-Pac-12 Honorable Mention in 2022. He returned to the Wildcats in 2023 with his fifth year of eligibility. Cowing set a school record of four touchdowns, two in overtime, in a week five loss to the USC Trojans after three overtimes. In the Valero Alamo Bowl, he caught a 35-yard touchdown pass in the first quarter and a 57-yard touchdown pass in the fourth quarter to help Arizona defeat Oklahoma 38-24, earning Offensive MVP of the match. Cowing finished the season with 90 receptions for 848 yards and 13 touchdowns, Arizona's single-season record for receiving touchdowns. He also completed five rushing attempts for 26 yards and six punt returns for 65 yards. Again, he received the All-Pac-12 Honorable Mention.

== Professional career ==
Pre-draft measurables
Height	Weight	Arm length	Hand span	Wingspan	40-yard dash	10-yard split	20-yard split	20-yard shuttle	Three-cone drill	Vertical jump	Broad jump	Bench press
5 ft 8 3/8 in (1.74 m)	168 lb (76 kg)	29 1/4 in (0.74 m)	9 in (0.23 m)	5 ft 9 1/8 in (1.76 m)	4.38 s	1.54 s	2.54 s	4.32 s	7.02 s	36.0 in (0.91 m)	10 ft 1 in (3.07 m)	13 reps
All values from NFL Combine/Pro Day

On April 27, 2024, Cowing was drafted by the San Francisco 49ers in the fourth round with the 135th overall pick in the 2024 NFL draft. The 49ers initially were supposed to draft 131st overall, until the pick was deferred four spots below. In 15 appearances for San Francisco during his rookie campaign, Cowing recorded four receptions for 80 yards and one rush attempt for seven yards. As a punt returner, he completed 28 returns for 245 total yards and also attempted one kick return for 32 yards.

On August 27, 2025, Cowing was placed on injured reserve due to a hamstring injury suffered during the preseason, causing him to miss out on the entire 2025 regular season.

== NFL career statistics ==
Regular season statistics
Year	Team	Games		Receiving					Rushing					Fumbles	
Year	Team	GP	GS	Rec	Yds	Avg	Lng	TD	Att	Yds	Avg	Lng	TD	Fum	Lost
2024	SF	15	0	4	80	20	41	0	—	—	—	—	—	1	0
Career		15	0	4	80	20.0	41	0	0	0	0	0	0	1	0
