= Sergio =

Sergio may refer to:

- Sergio (name), for people with the given name Sergio
- Sergio (carbonado), the largest rough diamond ever found
- Sergio, the mascot for the Old Orchard Beach Surge baseball team
- Sergio, a 2009 documentary film about United Nations diplomat Sérgio Vieira de Mello
- Sergio, a 2020 biographical drama film about United Nations diplomat Sérgio Vieira de Mello

== See also ==
- Hurricane Sergio (disambiguation)
