= Ak-Chin Indian Community =

Indian tribe in Arizona, United States

Ak-Chin Indian Community ʼAkĭ Ciñ Oʼodham (O'odham)
- Indian reservation
- Location in Arizona
- Coordinates: 33°0′10.08″N 112°1′22.44″W
- Country: United States
- State: Arizona
- County: Pinal
- Established: 1912

Government
  - Chair: Gabriel Lopez
  - Vice Chair: Delia Carlyle
  - Tribal Council: Council Members: Dennis Antone; Lisa Garcia; Cecil Peters

Area
  - Total: 22,000 acres (8,900 ha)
  - Rural: 15,000 acres (6,100 ha)
- Elevation: 1,186 ft (361 m)

Population (2020)
  - Total: 1,070
  - Density: 31/sq mi (12/km^{2})
- Time zone: UTC−7 (Mountain Time Zone)
  - Summer (DST): UTC−6 (Mountain Daylight Time)
- Area code: 520
- FIPS code: 04-04021
- GNIS feature ID: 542
- Website: ak-chin.nsn.us

The Ak Chin Indian Community of the Maricopa (Ak-Chin) Indian Reservation (Oʼodham language: ʼAkĭ Ciñ Oʼodham) is a federally recognized tribe of Native Americans headquartered in the Santa Cruz Valley in Pinal County, Arizona, 37 miles south of Phoenix and near the city of Maricopa.

The community is composed mainly of Akimel Oʼodham and Tohono Oʼodham, as well as some ethnic Hia-Ced Oʼodham people. According to the 2020 United States Census, the reservation has 1,070 residents. The community comprises more than 1,100 citizens who live on and off the reservation.

The Maricopa Reservation was established by the federal government in 1912, under President William Howard Taft; within a few months his administration reduced it by more than half, due to opposition from non-Native farmers in the area. Gaining federal recognition in 1961, the tribe has established a large agricultural operation, aided by gaining water rights to the Colorado River in a 1984 federal settlement. This settlement enabled it to continue using irrigation to support its agriculture and other needs.

The Ak-Chin Community opened a gaming casino in 1994, Harrah's Ak-Chin Casino, with related hotel facilities. In 2011, the casino and resort was the major contributor to the economy of Pinal County. In July 2011, the casino underwent a $20 million expansion, with the addition of a new 152-room hotel tower that doubled its capacity. The resort, completed in 2012, has 300 rooms and an outdoor swimming pool.

In 2006, the Ak-Chin Indian Community purchased the Phoenix Regional Airport, which was later renamed Ak-Chin Regional Airport. Located near the Santa Cruz Commerce Center, the 170-acre Ak-Chin Regional Airport consists of an airport building with a 5,000 ft. runway.

== Reservation ==
The Maricopa Reservation was established by the federal government in 1912, under President William Howard Taft, at 47,600 acres (193 km^{2}) in size. Within months the administration gave in to opposition from European-American farmers and other non-Natives and reduced the reservation to 22,000 acres (89 km^{2}). The reservation is located in Pinal County within the Sonoran Desert, about 40 miles south of Phoenix and next to Maricopa. Averaging an elevation of 1,186 feet (361 m), the reservation is located 37 miles (60 km) south of Phoenix. Much of the land is good for farming, and 15,000 acres (6,100 ha) are under irrigation.

== Government ==
The Ak-Chin Indian Community is headquartered in Maricopa, Arizona. In the mid-20th century, it reorganized with a newly ratified constitution, bylaws, and elected government, gaining federal recognition in 1961.

The chairman and vice chairman are elected by an at-large vote to serve four-year terms. The three council members serve two-year terms.

The November 2016 election was historic because it was the first time that tribal citizens were able to vote directly for chairman and vice chairman. Previously they had been elected from among the council members. A constitutional amendment in 2016 allowed candidates to run for a specific office, and for tribal citizens to vote specifically for the chairman and vice chairman in addition to council members.

As of 2025, the tribal council members and presiding officers are the following:

- Chairman: Gabriel Lopez
- Vice Chairman: Delia Carlyle
- Council Member: Dennis Antone
- Council Member: Delia M. Carlyle
- Council Member: Lisa Garcia
- Council Member: Cecil Peters.

== Demographics ==
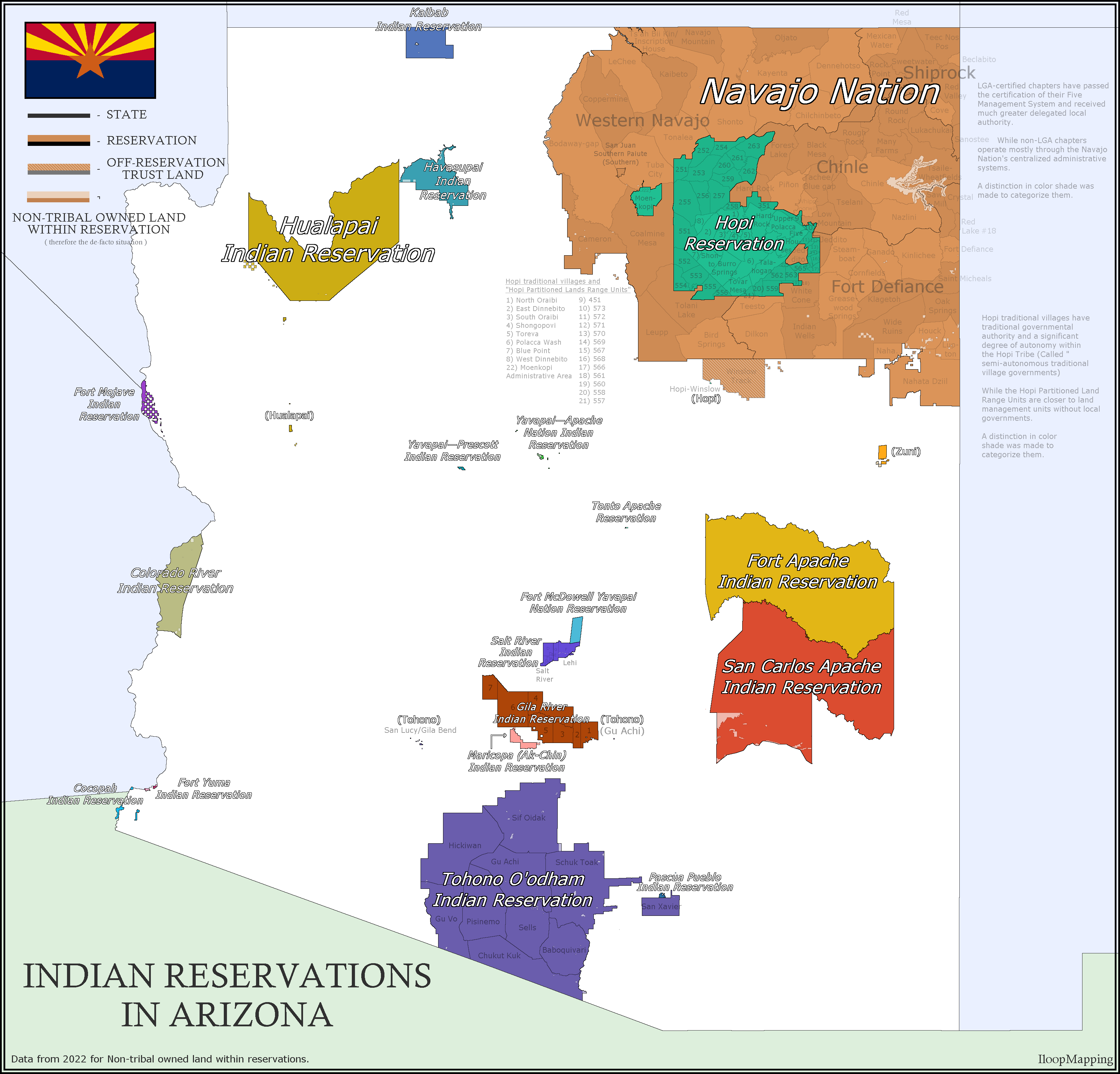
Map of Ak-Chin Indian Community and other Arizona tribes

Most of the population lives in Ak-Chin Village, in the western part of the reservation. Part of the city of Maricopa also lies within reservation territory. In total, the area (including tribal citizens and non-citizens) comprises 1,070 as of the 2020 United States Census. The 2020 U.S. Census also reports that 87.5% (914 individuals) of the total 1,070 population comprises American Indian or Native Alaskans. This is an increase of 742 from 2000. Of those individuals, 90.2% were born on the reservation and/or in Arizona. Additionally, 16.3% identify as Hispanic or Latino, 6.2% two or more races, 1.5% White, and 0.3% African American or Black. Of the total population, 47.8% are male and 52.2% are female. The majority of the population are ages 25 to 44 (29%) or 5 to 17 years of age (23.5%), with 7.9% ages 65 and older. The average median age is 27.9 years old.

Of the total population, 37.4% live below the federal poverty line. The 2020 American Community Survey reports that 33.7% of the working population is employed in the service industry, specifically public administration, education, health care, social services, and arts and recreation. Regarding housing, 94.5% of the total population are renters.

== Language ==
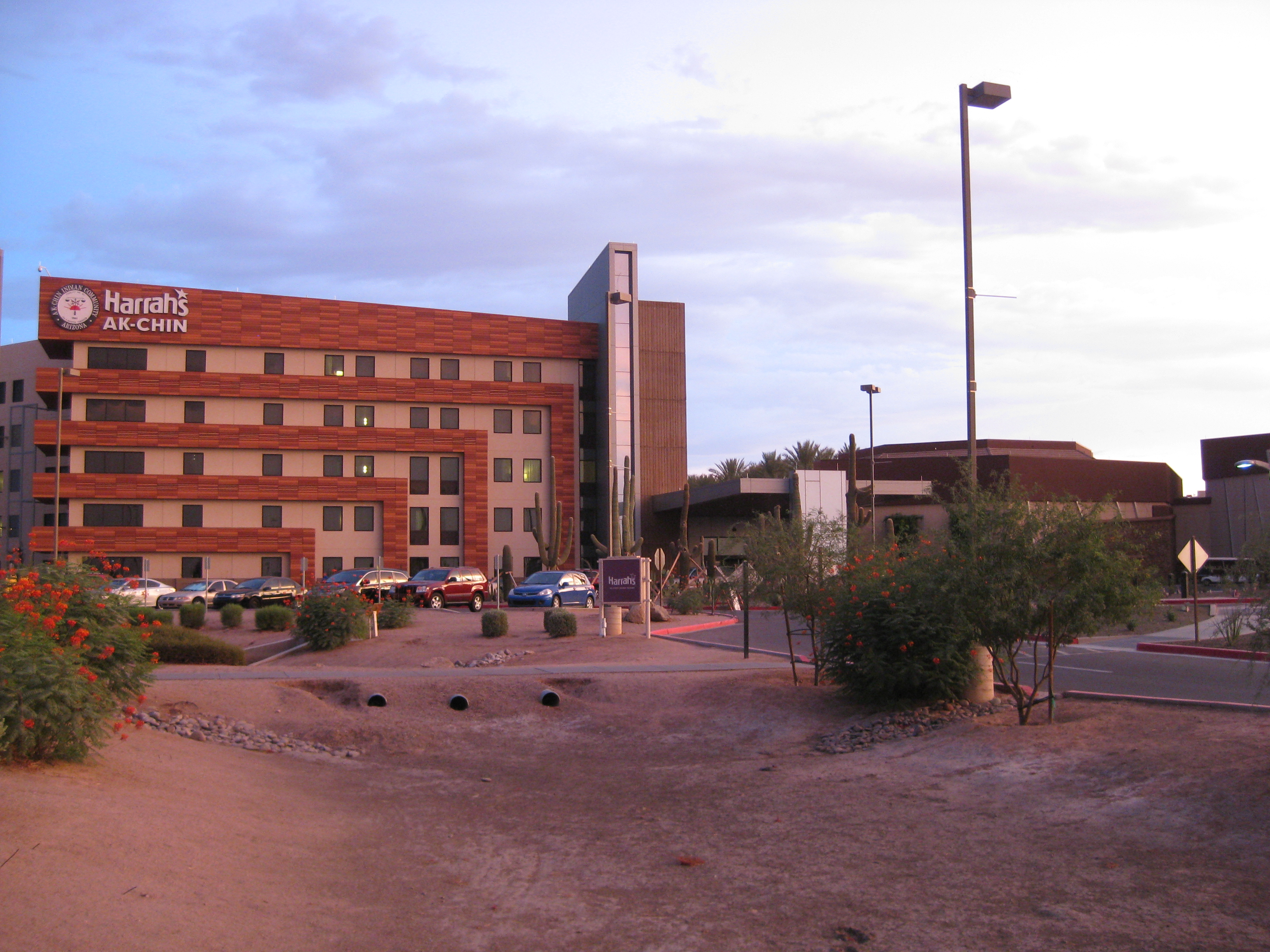
Harrah's Ak-Chin Casino

The Ak-Chin Indian Community has its own written form of the Oʼodham language. It is in the Piman group of the Uto-Aztecan language family. The name Ak-Chin is an Oʼodham word that means the "mouth of the arroyo."

== Education ==
The reservation is served by the Maricopa Unified School District. For elementary education, it's zoned partially to Maricopa Elementary School and partially to Saddleback Elementary School. Secondary education is provided by Maricopa Wells Middle School and Maricopa High School.

== Economy ==
Ak-Chin Farms Enterprises is the Community's agricultural business. It controls 15,000 acres, making it one of the largest agricultural communities in the country. It has long used irrigation to support this enterprise. In 1984 the tribe gained a federal settlement for water rights, being entitled to 75,000 acre-feet of Colorado River water. The farms raise mostly cotton, barley, wheat and milo.

The tribe also owns and operates Harrah's Ak-Chin Casino, which opened in 1994, and related resort facilities: Agave's Southwestern Restaurant, Copper Cactus Grill, Harvest Buffet, the Range restaurant, and hotel, all located in Maricopa. The tribe owns the naming rights for the Ak-Chin Pavilion, a venue in Phoenix designed for various entertainment acts. The casino and resort draw customers from Maricopa and nearby county population, as well as from the large Phoenix metropolitan area.

According to a study conducted in 2011, "Harrah's Ak-Chin Casino Resort is the largest contributor to the Pinal County economy, accounting for nearly 1,100 jobs and generating more than $205.3 million in economic activity in 2010." Expansion of the resort by addition of a large hotel tower has generated higher revenues since then.

Revenues from the casino and resort have enabled the tribe to invest in other development. In 2006 it purchased the 450-acre former Phoenix Regional Airport property, renamed in 2012 as Ak-Chin Regional Airport. It is being improved. Nearby the tribe acquired the 50-acre Santa Cruz Commerce Center industrial park, which is being developed under leases. The tribe has set up the Ak-Chin Industrial Park Board to make leases and monitor development there. The tribe applied to the BIA to have both properties taken into trust on its behalf. It continues to work with local communities on development nearby.

In 2010, the tribe purchased the Southern Dunes Golf Club, which is open to the public for fees. The tribe makes it available as an amenity to guests at Harrah's Ak-Chin Casino Resort.

In November 2012, the tribe opened the $50 million, 165,000-square foot Ak-Chin entertainment complex, with a multi-theater cinema, bowling alley, restaurants, arcade and areas for staging events. It is located at the edge of the reservation next to the city of Maricopa. Mayor Christian Price said he thought the project would be "a great addition to the area" and that the city and tribe could encourage other development in the area.

From its strong gaming and resort revenues, the tribe has made several improvements within the reservation, including the construction of a new fire station, water reclamation facility, and surface water treatment plant.

== Notable tribal citizens ==
- Robert Miguel, former tribal chairman
