= Desert Sunrise High School =

Public school in Arizona, United States

Coordinates: 33°1′35″N 111°56′53″W

Location
- 16200 North Murphy Road; Maricopa, Arizona 85138

Information
- School type: Public high school
- Established: 2022
- School district: Maricopa Unified School District
- Principal: Phillip Verdugo
- Teaching staff: 40.30 (FTE)
- Enrollment: 1,016 (2023-2024)
- Student to teacher ratio: 25.21
- Colors: Blue and gold
- Mascot: Gary the Golden Hawk
- Website: www.musd20.org/dshs

Desert Sunrise High School is a comprehensive public high school in Maricopa, Arizona, in the United States. The school is in the Maricopa Unified School District, and is located on Murphy Rd and Farrell Rd in Maricopa. Its school mascot is Gary the Golden Hawk, and its colors are blue and gold. Desert Sunrise opened in July 2022 with grades 9 and 10 for the 2022-23 school year. Grade 11 was added for the 2023-24 school year, followed by grade 12 for the 2024-25 school year.

== History ==
In 2018, about $26 million was approved by the School Facilities Board to construct a second high school in the Maricopa Unified School District. The school district noticed a growing student population and the need for additional classroom space. It was designed by the Orcutt Winslow architectural firm and was built by Chasse Building Team. Ground was broken on May 7, 2021. The school will be built in three phases. The first phase consists of classroom space that can be scaled up as the student population grows. It also includes a gymnasium and cafeteria. A third building houses the administrative offices. A soft opening was held on May 24, 2022. On the same day, ground was broken for phase 2, which includes sporting facilities, a building for a library, counseling offices, and a performance stage. Phase 2 opened at the beginning of the 2023-2024 school year. Future plans include additional classrooms, an arts complex, and a career and technical education building.

=== RED Awards ===
In March 2024, Desert Sunrise received top honors at the 2024 Real Estate Development Awards in the K-12 category.

=== AgriScience Greenhouse ===
In April 2024, it was announced that a greenhouse would be constructed for the school's AgriScience program, and it would be used for various student projects.

=== Acid Fume Exposure and Evacuation ===
On October 24, 2024, students at Desert Sunrise High School were evacuated to the school parking lot sometime around 10:24 a.m. due to exposure to salicylic acid fumes in a science classroom. Students returned to classes around 11:36, after a response to the situation by the Maricopa police and fire departments. Parents were promptly notified about the situation and were asked to monitor their children for "any signs of breathing difficulty over the next 24 hours."
