= Pet Social Worker / Tails of Hope Rescue =

Pet Social Worker / Tails of Hope is an animal rescue group based in Maricopa, Arizona. Pet Social Worker (PSW) is a nonprofit organization that is a 501(c)3 exempt entity.

PetSocialWorker.org offers a free online database of stray, rescued, lost and found pets in the Maricopa area. In addition, they offer tips, instructions and links to the local Pinal County Animal Care and Control forms needed to report a lost or found pet.

Pet Social Worker/Tails of Hope started in 2004. The website, PetSocialWorker.org began in 2007 as a place for animals available for adoption in Maricopa to be posted by rescue organizations and individuals helping to find forever homes for these pets. To consolidate information and offer local Maricopa area residents a place to go to find information if they have lost or found an animal, the rescue added the lost and found service to PetSocialWorker.org in December 2008.

Pet Social Worker has collaborated with Maricopa Wells Veterinary Hospital and the Maricopa Animal Hospital, Pinal County, Arizona Animal Care and Control, as well as the City of Maricopa, Arizona and local websites and newspapers on an incentive basis. If a report of a lost or found pet comes into either Vet or through contact with the staff of Pet Social Worker / Tails of Hope Rescue, the information is posted on PetSocialWorker.org and posted via news feeds on the other websites.

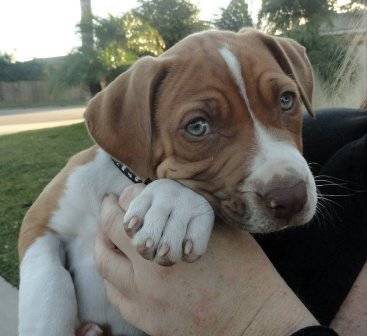
Dolli was recently posted on PetSocialWorker.org.

== Grants ==
In 2009, Pet Social Worker was awarded a $100 grant from the Build-A-Bear Foundation. This grant helped fund the Pet Social Worker SNAP, the low and no-cost Spay And Neuter Program in Maricopa, Arizona.

In 2011 Pet Social Worker was awarded a $100 grant from the Allstate Insurance / Allstate Foundation to continue rescue efforts in the City of Maricopa, Arizona.
