= Maricopa Mountains =

Landform in Maricopa County, Arizona

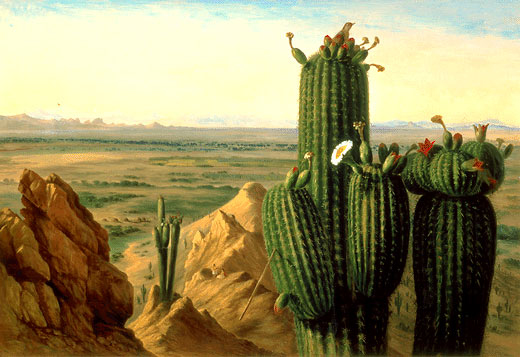
Henry Cheever Pratt - View from Maricopa Mountain near the Rio Gila - 1855

Maricopa Mountains are a range of mountains in Maricopa County, Arizona.The range runs from 33°08′51″N 112°34′23″W and extends southeastward to 32°53′43″N 112°20′41″W. The range is protected as the North Maricopa Mountains Wilderness and South Maricopa Mountains Wilderness, divided by Arizona State Route 238 all within the Sonoran Desert National Monument.

== See also ==
- List of mountain ranges of Arizona
