= Ak-Chin Regional Airport =

Airport in Pinal County, Arizona

Ak-Chin Regional Airport (previously Phoenix Regional Airport)
- IATA: none; ICAO: none; FAA LID: A39

Summary
- Airport type: Public
- Owner/Operator: Ak-Chin Indian Community
- Serves: Phoenix, Arizona
- Elevation AMSL: 1,300 ft (400 m)
- Coordinates: 32.9908°N 111.9186°W

Map
- Location within Arizona Location within the United States

Runways
Direction	Length		Surface
Direction	ft	m	Surface
4/22	5,000	1,524	Asphalt
- Source: Federal Aviation Administration

Ak-Chin Regional Airport (FAA LID: A39) (previously "Phoenix Regional Airport") is a privately owned public-use airport located 32 miles (28 nmi; 51 km) south east of the CBD of Phoenix, in Pinal County, Arizona, United States.

== Facilities and aircraft ==
Ak-Chin Regional Airport covers an area of 170 acres (69 ha) at an elevation of 1,300 feet (400 m) above mean sea level. It has one runway:

- 4/22 measuring 4,751 x 50 feet (1,448 x 15 m) with an asphalt surface.

The runway was repaired, resealed, and painted in January 2019.

For the 12-month period ending April 21, 2017, the airport had 31,682 aircraft operations, an average of 2640 per month. At that time there were 10 aircraft based at this airport: 9 single-engine and 1 multi-engine.

== See also ==
- List of airports in Arizona
