= List of storms named Sergio =

The name Sergio has been used for four tropical cyclones in the Eastern Pacific Ocean.

- Tropical Storm Sergio (1978) – weak tropical storm that dissipated near Baja California
- Hurricane Sergio (1982) – Category 3 hurricane that moved parallel to Mexico
- Hurricane Sergio (2006) – late-season Category 2 hurricane that stayed at sea
- Hurricane Sergio (2018) – Category 4 hurricane that made landfall in Baja California as a tropical storm
