= Sardis, Texas =

Unincorporated community in Ellis County, Texas, United States

Coordinates: 32°25′43.5″N 96°54′22.0″W

Sardis is an unincorporated community in Ellis County, Texas, United States. The community is located alongside U.S. Route 287, west of Waxahachie.

== History ==
The first settlers arrived in 1855, and in 1858 Captain William Wade Peevey settled in the area.
