= Harrah's Ak-Chin Casino =

Hotel and casino in Maricopa, Arizona

Harrah's Ak-Chin
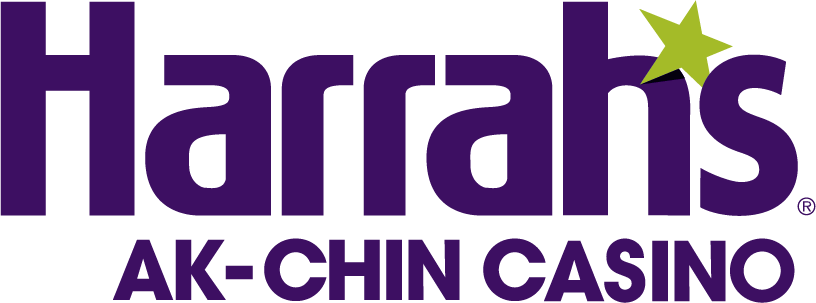

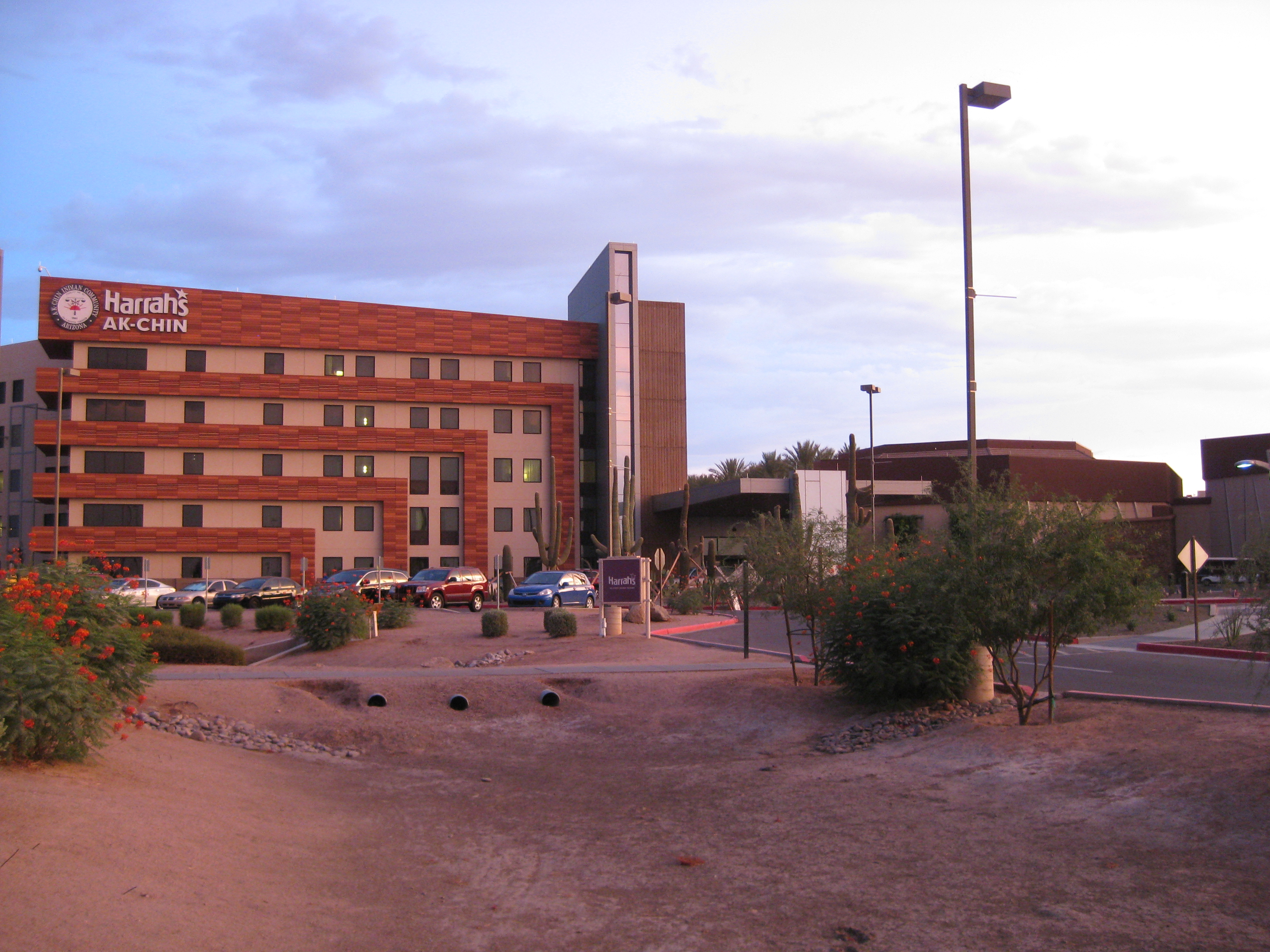
- Interactive map of Harrah's Ak-Chin
- Location: Maricopa, Arizona, U.S.; 15406 North Maricopa Road; 33.02413°N 112.05016°W
- Opened: December 27, 1994; 31 years ago
- No. of rooms: 529
- Gaming space: 40,000 sq ft (3,700 m^{2})
- Notable restaurants: Agave's Restaurant; Copper Cactus Grill; Dunkin' Donuts; Oak & Fork; Chop, Block & Brew
- Owner: Ak-Chin Indian Community
- Operating license holder: Caesars Entertainment
- Website: caesars.com/harrahs-ak-chin

Harrah's Ak-Chin is a hotel and casino located 39 miles (63 km) south of Phoenix, Arizona, in Maricopa. It is owned by the Ak-Chin Indian Community and operated by Caesars Entertainment. The casino offers an extensive array of gaming options, including bingo, craps, sports betting, slot machines, video poker, video keno, statewide progressives, and blackjack.

In July 2011, the casino underwent a $20 million expansion, with the addition of a new 152-room hotel tower that doubled its capacity. The resort completed another expansion in 2018 to include a 12-story hotel tower with an additional 200 rooms, totaling 529 total rooms. The pool and swim-up bar were renovated in early 2019. This expansion also included an 18,000-square-foot multi-use entertainment space for live shows, weddings, and banquets, a spa and fitness center as well as a multi-story parking garage.

== History ==
Harrah's Ak-Chin has served more than one million customers since opening on December 27, 1994. It has hosted more than 750,000 hotel guests since 2001.

=== Timeline ===
- December 27, 1994 – Harrah's Ak-Chin Casino opens in Maricopa, Arizona. It is Arizona's first and only Indian casino to have a management partner, Caesars Entertainment.
- October 1997 – A Harrah's Ak-Chin guest wins $330,000 on a malfunctioning Quartermania slot machine. Debate follows as to whether the guest will be paid because the machine was faulty, but Harrah's eventually awards her the full sum.
- March 2001 – Harrah's Ak-Chin opens its resort hotel with 144 guest rooms and four guest suites.
- February 2003 – The casino begins to offer table games such as poker and blackjack.
- June 2003 – Ak-Chin bingo operations move from the casino to the newly built Bingo Hall.
- November 2009 – The 148 rooms on the property are remodeled.
- December 2009 – The Ak-Chin Indian Community extends the Harrah's management agreement for five more years.
- June 2010 – Harrah's Ak-Chin breaks ground on the site of its hotel expansion: a five-story, 152-room hotel tower on the existing property. All 152 rooms include upgraded amenities, including 50-inch flat-screen televisions.
- July 2010 – The Ak-Chin Indian Community purchases Southern Dunes Golf Club, which is managed by Troon Golf. The club is open to the public and offered as an amenity to resort guests.
- November 2010 – Harrah's Ak-Chin completes a remodel of The Buffet.
- July 2011 – Harrah's Ak-Chin completes a $20 million expansion and opens the new hotel tower.
- May 2012 – Harrah's Ak-Chin completes a remodel of the pool with a swim-up bar.
- August 2013 – Harrah's Ak-Chin completes a $1.25 million renovation of the 2,765-square-foot Lounge.
- December 2013 – Harrah's Ak-Chin completes renovation of the Total Rewards (now known as Caesars Rewards) Center and adds Dunkin' Donuts.
- June 2016 – Harrah's Ak-Chin begins a multi-million-dollar expansion.
- November 2017 – Harrah's Ak-Chin opens a multi-level parking garage and expands the gaming floor.
- December 2017 – Harrah's Ak-Chin opens a renovated Bingo Hall and a new restaurant called Oak & Fork, offering wine and small plates.
- March 2018 – The Ak-Chin Indian Community opens the Ak-Chin Circle Pedestrian Bridge connecting Harrah's Ak-Chin and Ultra-Star Multitainment Center (now known as the Ak-Chin Circle Entertainment Center).
- July 2018 – Fitness Center opens.
- August 2018 – The Spa at Harrah’s Ak-Chin Casino opens and features four treatment rooms, including one couple's suite. Chop, Block & Brew opens and features gourmet burgers and a wood-burning mesquite grill, offering steaks, prime rib, and seafood. In addition, the restaurant includes a full bar with more than 30 draft and bottled craft beers, hand-crafted cocktails, premium whiskey, and scotch.
- November 2018 – Addition of a 12-story hotel tower and 730-space parking garage is completed.
- February 2019 – The loyalty program Total Rewards rebrands as Caesars Rewards.
- April 2019 – Pool renovation is completed.
- July 2019 – The 18,000-square-foot Events Center at Harrah’s Ak-Chin opens with seating capacity for more than 2,000 and features entertainment events.
- January 2020 – Agave's Restaurant renovation is completed.
- March 2020 – The entire property closes due to the COVID-19 pandemic. The Ak-Chin Tribal Council provides funding to keep all employees on payroll.
- May 2020 – The entire property reopens with new health and safety procedures in place.
- July 2020 – Caesars Entertainment is acquired by Eldorado Resorts.
- October 2020 – Ultra-Star Multitainment Center becomes Ak-Chin Entertainment Circle Entertainment Center.
- April 15, 2021 – Sports betting becomes legal in Arizona when Governor Doug Ducey signs House Bill 2772 into law.
- September 2021 – Live craps, roulette, and baccarat open.
- September 9, 2021 – The first online and retail sportsbooks officially launch in Arizona.
- December 16, 2021 – Harrah’s Ak-Chin Casino guests can place sports bets at the Caesars Sportsbook at Harrah’s Ak-Chin.
- March 2026 – Caesars Sportsbar opens to casino and hotel guests.
- May 2026 – A new expanded gaming space is set to open.

== Amenities ==
=== Dining ===
- Agave's Restaurant – a casual café with indoor and outdoor seating serving breakfast, lunch and dinner.
- Copper Cactus Grill – Pizza, burgers, sandwiches, nachos and all-day breakfast.
- Dunkin'® - serving donuts, breakfast sandwiches, and coffee.
- The Buffet at Harrah's is permanently closed.
- Oak & Fork – Offering a stylish setting and outdoor patio, the family-friendly restaurant features Italian inspired dishes, beer, wine and cocktails.
- Chop, Block & Brew – serving gourmet steaks and seafood, craft beer and hand-crafted cocktails.
- Caesars Sportsbar - a lively gathering spot featuring wall-to-wall TVs, sports memorabilia, a full bar, and classic game day foods.

=== Entertainment ===
The Events Center at Harrah's Ak-Chin is an 18,000-square-foot entertainment hall, featuring live performances such as comedy acts and national headliners.

=== Additional amenities ===
The Ak-Chin property features an outdoor pool with swim-up bar, private cabanas and daybeds available for rent. Cocktail and food service are available for guests.

The Spa at Harrah's Ak-Chin offers traditional and modern spa treatments with four treatment rooms, including one couple's suite.

In July 2010, the Ak-Chin Indian Community purchased Southern Dunes Golf Club, located in Maricopa, Ariz., near Harrah’s Ak-Chin. Southern Dunes is managed by Troon Golf and covers more than 320 acres and features an 8,000-square-foot (740 m²) clubhouse. In 2009, Southern Dunes was named among Golfweek's "Best You Can Play, State-By-State" list of courses in the United States.

In the fall of 2012, the Ak-Chin Indian Community opened the 165,000-square-foot UltraStar Multi-Tainment Center at Ak-Chin Circle, operated by California-based UltraStar Cinemas. The $50 million project features restaurants, a bowling alley, and areas for staging events. It neighbors Harrah's Ak-Chin Casino and is accessible via a pedestrian bridge connecting the two properties. As of October 2020, the facility is operated by the Ak-Chin Indian Community and was renamed AK-Chin Circle Entertainment Center.

== Awards ==
- Harrah's Ak-Chin was named a "2010 Most Admired Company" by Arizona Business Magazine and BestCompanies AZ. *Phoenix Business Journal has ranked the facility as one of the "Best Places to Work in the Valley" in 2008, 2009, 2010, and 2011.
- Ak-Chin Southern Dunes was ranked #5 in 2015 of "Best Courses You Can Play in Arizona" by Golf Magazine & Golfweek
- Harrah's Ak-Chin was awarded the 2011 Volunteer Service Award from the Arizona Governor's Commission on Service and Volunteerism.
- Harrah's Ak-Chin was voted the Best Employer of Maricopa for the Creme de la Copa 2021.
- Tripadvisor, the world’s largest travel platform, recognizes Harrah’s Ak-Chin Casino as a 2021 Travelers’ Choice Award winner.
- Harrah's Ak-Chin Casino’s managing partner Caesars Entertainment recognized as a Top 1,000 Employer in the United States for 2023.
- Harrah's Ak-Chin Casino recognized as one of Arizona’s Most Admired Companies (MAC) of 2023.
