= Maricopa Unified School District =

School district in Arizona, United States

Address
- 44150 West Maricopa Casa Grande Highway Maricopa, Arizona, 85138; United States

District information
- Type: Public
- Grades: PreK–12
- NCES District ID: 0404720

Students and staff
- Students: 7,683
- Teachers: 393.99
- Staff: 413.55
- Student–teacher ratio: 19.5

Other information
- Website: www.musd20.org

The Maricopa Unified School District is the main public school district in the city of Maricopa, Arizona. It operates six elementary schools, two middle schools, and two high schools as well as an online school. The district (as of 2018) is at an "A" rating.

== Schools ==
=== Elementary ===
- Butterfield Elementary
- Saddleback Elementary
- Santa Rosa Elementary
- Santa Cruz Elementary
- Maricopa Elementary
- Pima Butte Elementary

=== K-8 ===
- Alma Farrell Inovation Academy

=== Middle ===
- Desert Wind Middle School
- Maricopa Wells Middle School

=== High ===
- Desert Sunrise High School
- Maricopa High School

=== Online School ===
- Maricopa Virtual Academy
