= Maricopa High School =

Public high school in Maricopa, Arizona

Location
- 45012 W. Honeycutt Avenue; Maricopa, Arizona 85139; United States
- Coordinates: 33°3′14″N 112°3′11″W

Information
- School type: Public high school
- Established: Circa 1955
- School district: Maricopa Unified School District
- CEEB code: 030202
- Principal: Kevin Sotomayor
- Teaching staff: 89.20 (FTE)
- Grades: 9–12
- Enrollment: 2,041 (2023–2024)
- Student to teacher ratio: 22.88
- Colors: Red, white and black
- Mascot: Rams
- Website: www.musd20.org/mhs

Maricopa High School is a high school in Maricopa, Arizona under the jurisdiction of the Maricopa Unified School District.

Maricopa High School was opened in 1955 with the first freshman class, which had 35 students, and for the next decade, it held fewer than 100 students. The school's first graduating class was the class of 1959. At the height of the Baby Boom era, Maricopa peaked in 1976 with 218 students. It next surpassed that in 1985, when the school had 221 students. At the end of 1999, the school had some 306 students.

The 2000s were a decade of stunning growth in Pinal County (which saw 109% growth) and especially Maricopa (which grew 4,180%). In 2000, Maricopa had 308 students. That jumped quickly (within five years) to 551, then to 1190 by October 2007, 1473 in October 2008, and 1612 in October 2010. Maricopa High School is now larger than the town of Maricopa was in the year 2000 (1,040 residents).

== Notable alumni ==
- Jacob Cowing, NFL wide receive for the San Francisco 49ers. Played college football wide receiver for the Arizona Wildcats.
