= Sonoran Desert National Monument =

Protected area in Arizona

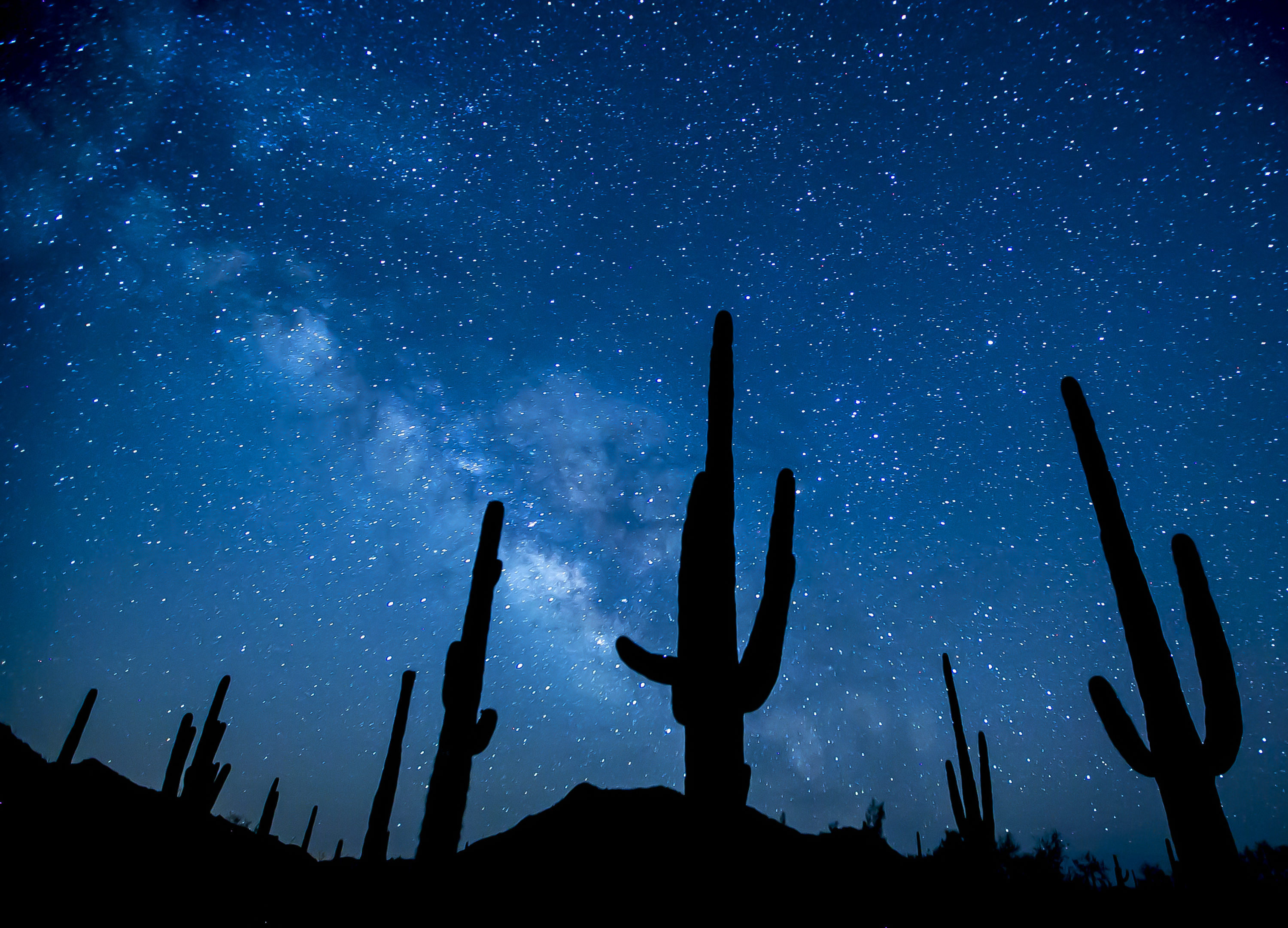

- Location within the United States
- Interactive map of Sonoran Desert National Monument
- Location: Maricopa County & Pinal County, Arizona, United States
- Nearest city: Phoenix, AZ
- Coordinates: 33°0′6″N 112°27′18″W
- Area: 496,400 acres (200,886 ha)
- Established: January 17, 2001
- Governing body: U.S. Bureau of Land Management
- Website: Sonoran Desert National Monument

U.S. National Monument

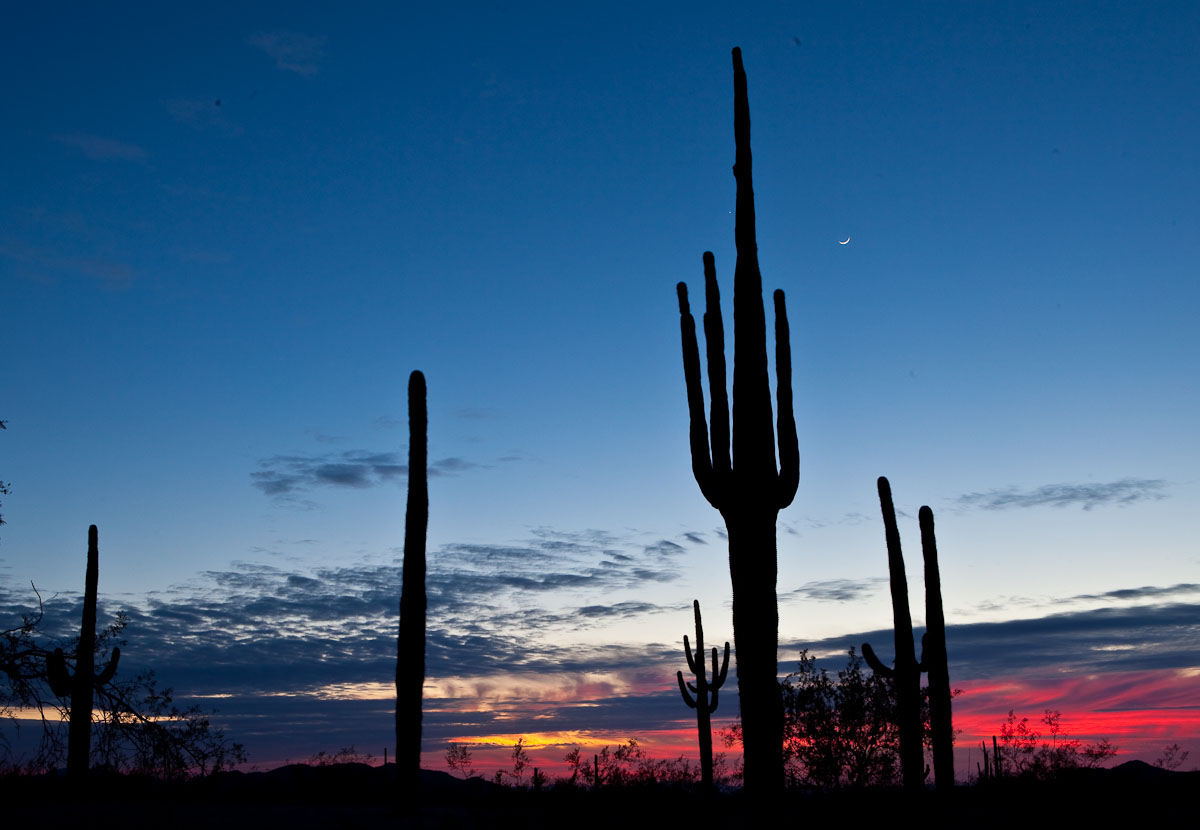
Sonoran Desert National Monument, sunset view

Sonoran Desert National Monument is south of Goodyear and Buckeye and east of Gila Bend, Arizona. Created by Presidential proclamation on January 17, 2001, the 496,400 acres (200,886 ha) monument is managed by the U.S. Bureau of Land Management as part of the National Landscape Conservation System. The BLM already managed the lands, however under monument status, the level of protection and preservation of resources is enhanced. Sonoran Desert National Monument protects but a small portion of the Sonoran Desert, which is 120,000 square miles (311,000 km^{2}), and extends well into California and the country of Mexico. The North Maricopa Mountains, South Maricopa Mountains and the Table Top Wildernesses protect the richest regions of desert habitat from development.

== Proclamation ==
The Sonoran Desert National Monument is unique among monuments in that its establishing Proclamation specifically mentioned the impacts of livestock grazing on Monument "objects." The Proclamation mandated the closure of all grazing allotments south of Interstate 8 at the expiration of their permits. The BLM was charged with determining compatibility of livestock grazing and resource protection for the grazing allotments north of the Interstate, which it has thus far not completed.

In his Proclamation, President Clinton wrote a description of the protected area:

"The Sonoran Desert National Monument is a magnificent example of untrammeled Sonoran desert landscape. The area encompasses a functioning desert ecosystem with an extraordinary array of biological, scientific, and historic resources. The monument’s biological resources include a spectacular diversity of plant and animal species. The monument also contains many significant archaeological and historic sites, including rock art sites, lithic quarries, and scattered artifacts. The most biologically diverse of the North American deserts ..."

The Monument is home to several federally listed endangered species.

== See also ==
- List of national monuments of the United States
