= Arizona State Route 238 =

State highway in Arizona, United States

State Route 238
- SR 238 highlighted in red

Route information
- Maintained by ADOT
- Length: 20.27 mi (32.62 km)
- Existed: 1986–present

Major junctions
- West end: Maricopa Road near Mobile, Arizona
- East end: SR 347 in Maricopa

Location
- Country: United States
- State: Arizona
- Counties: Maricopa, Pinal

Highway system
- Arizona State Highway System; Interstate; US; State; Scenic Proposed; Former
← SR 210	→ SR 260

State Route 238, also known as SR 238, is an east–west state highway in central Arizona.

== Route description ==
While the mile markers indicate a start in Gila Bend, the highway is not actually part of the State Highway System until 11 miles (17.70 km) west of the Maricopa/Pinal County line near the Goodyear neighborhood of Mobile, at Mile Marker 24 in the Sonoran Desert National Monument. The road west of this point is actually a county route. This stretch of road is known as Maricopa Road (except for a brief portion signed as Smith Enke Road within the city of Maricopa) and serves as a direct route between the two towns as well as an access road for the Sonoran Desert National Monument. It was originally a dirt road from Gila Bend to Maricopa, it was upgraded to a state highway to serve a proposed hazardous waste management facility west of Mobile. The official State Highway map shows this road terminating at Maricopa at the junction with State Route 347. Since its upgrade to a paved highway, this road has become a common shortcut for residents of the southern part of the Phoenix Metropolitan Area travelling to Yuma and San Diego.

Some road maps show a continuation of the route eastbound; after briefly overlapping a short southbound stretch of State Route 347 (also, confusingly, known as Maricopa Road or the John Wayne Parkway), the highway beelines southeast to its eastern terminus at Casa Grande; this stretch of the highway is known as the Maricopa-Casa Grande Highway. According to ADOT, this section of road is not currently commissioned .

Virtually the entire road follows the Union Pacific Railroad's Sunset Route, with brief detours at the Maricopa and Casa Grande townsites.

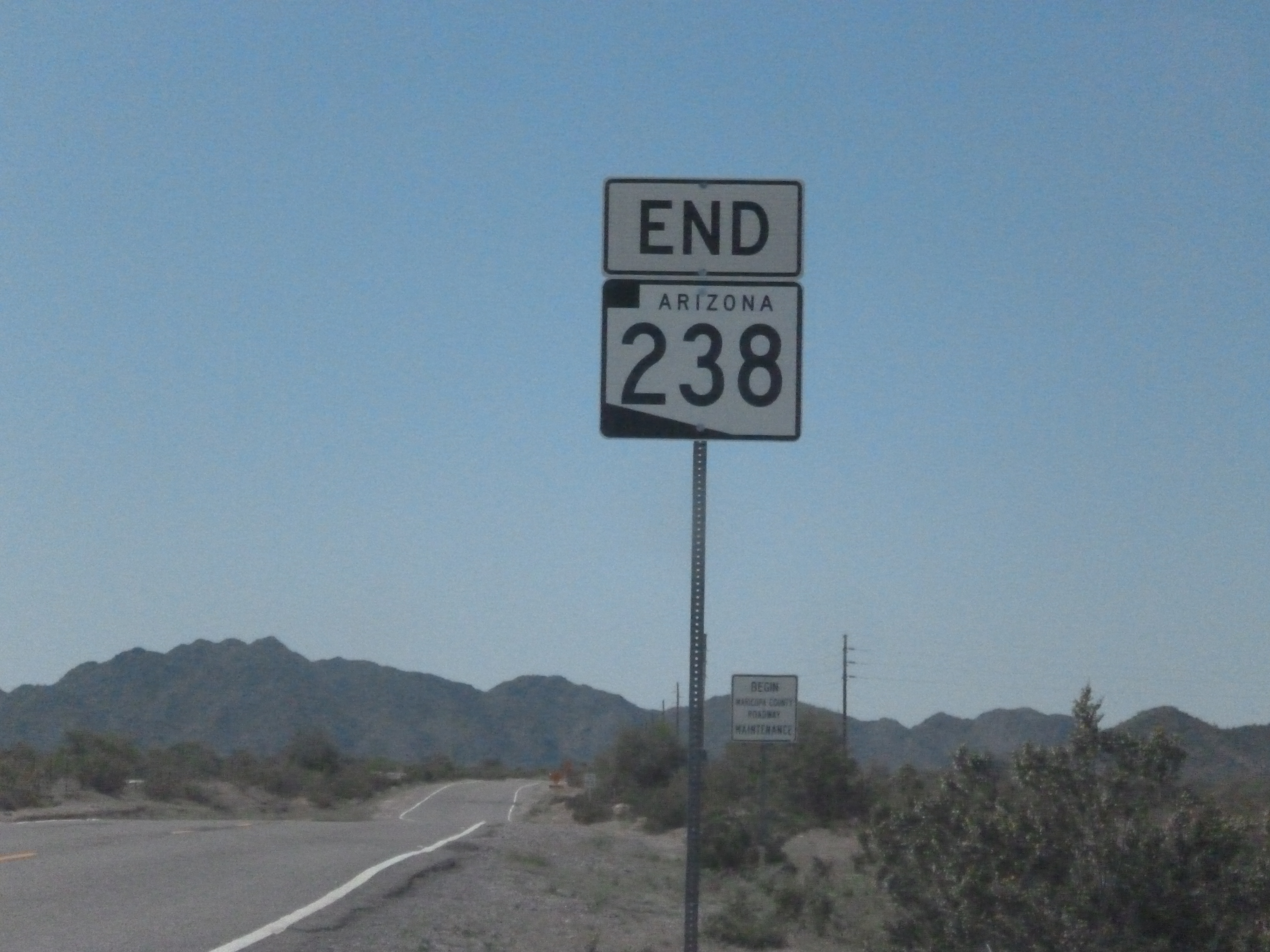
Arizona Route 238 End Marker

== Junction list ==
The highway begins on Maricopa Road, MP 24.

County	Location	mi	km	Destinations	Notes
Maricopa		24.00	38.62	Maricopa Road west	Continuation beyond western terminus
Pinal	Maricopa	44.25	71.21	SR 347 (John Wayne Parkway)	Eastern terminus; road continues as Smith Enke Road
1.000 mi = 1.609 km; 1.000 km = 0.621 mi
