= Maricopa, Arizona =

City in Arizona, United States

Maricopa
- City
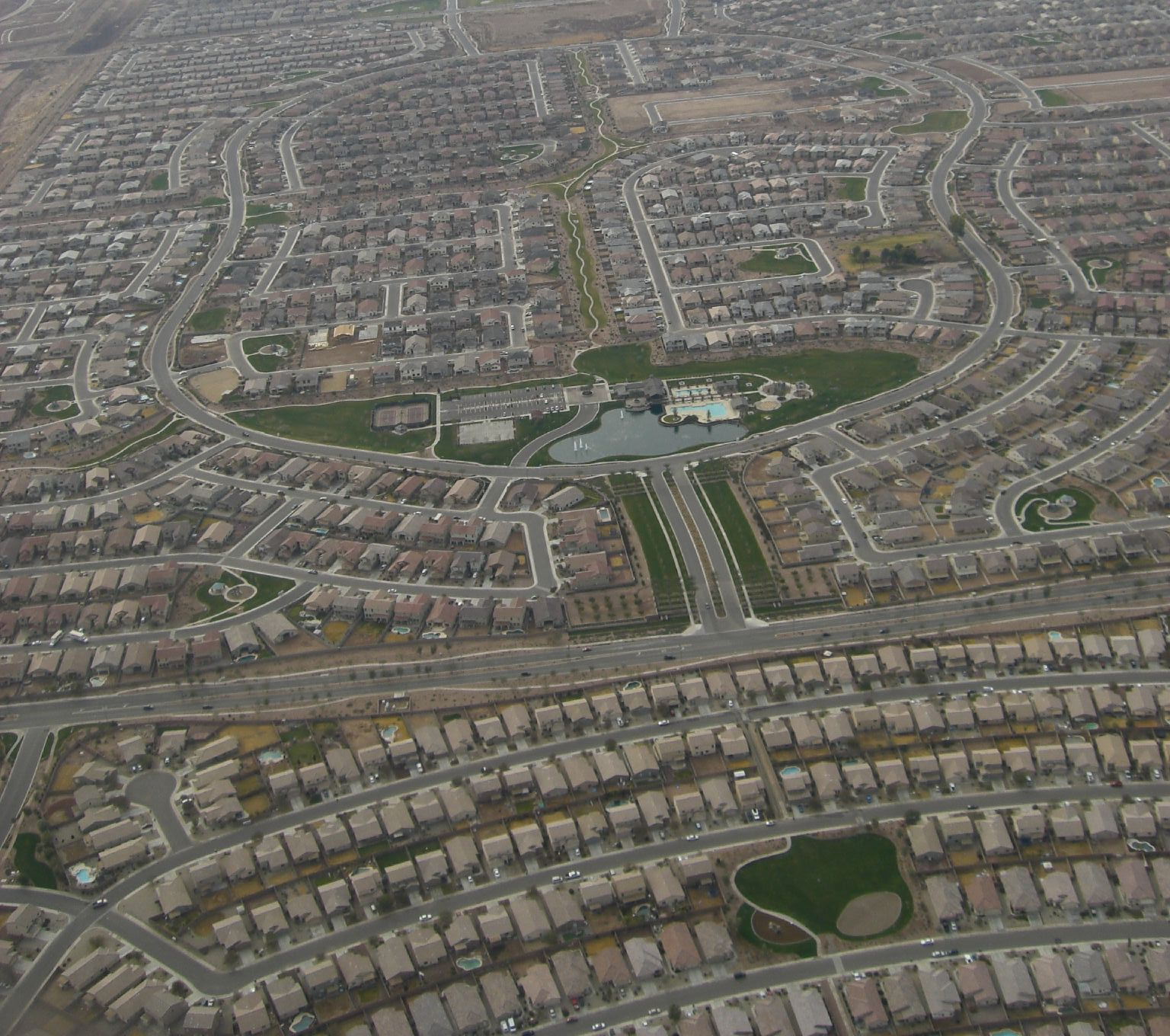
- Residential developments dominate the landscape of Maricopa

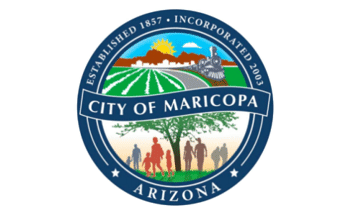
- Flag Seal Logo

- Location of Maricopa in Pinal County, Arizona

- Location in the United States
- Coordinates: 33°3′24″N 112°2′48″W
- Country: United States
- State: Arizona
- County: Pinal
- Established: 1857
- Incorporated: 2003

Government
  - Type: Council-manager government
  - Mayor: Nancy Smith
  - Vice Mayor: Henry Wade
  - City Council: Vincent Manfredi, Amber Liermann, Bob Marsh, Eric Goettl, AnnaMarie Knorr
  - City Manager: Benjamin Bitter
  - City Clerk: Vanessa Bueras

Area
  - Total: 42.59 sq mi (110.32 km^{2})
  - Land: 42.49 sq mi (110.06 km^{2})
  - Water: 0.10 sq mi (0.26 km^{2})
- Elevation: 1,201 ft (366 m)

Population (2020)
  - Total: 58,125
  - Density: 1,556.3/sq mi (600.89/km^{2})
- Demonym: Maricopan or Arizonan
- Time zone: UTC-7 (MST (no DST))
- ZIP code: 85138, 85139
- Area code: 520
- FIPS code: 04-44410
- GNIS feature ID: 2411032
- Website: https://www.maricopa-az.gov/home

Maricopa is a city in the Gila River Valley in Pinal County, Arizona, United States. With 76,654 residents as of 2024, Maricopa is the second largest incorporated municipality in Pinal County.

== History ==
The settlement currently known as Maricopa has been located in three different places with three previous names: Maricopa Wells, Maricopaville and Maricopa Junction; the latter gradually became known as Maricopa. It began as an oasis around a series of watering holes eight miles north of present-day Maricopa, and about a mile west of Pima Butte. European-American traders and travelers called it Maricopa Wells. Several of Arizona's rivers, the Gila, Santa Cruz, Vekol and Santa Rosa, provided this oasis in the desert with an ample supply of water during this time.

During the late 1800s, Maricopa Wells was one of the most important relay stations along the San Antonio-San Diego Mail Line and the later more famous Butterfield Overland Mail Route. Today, very little remains of this once bustling community, but it played an important part in the progress and development of the Southwest. It was one of the best-known spots in Arizona during this period of time because it had a reliable source of water, and offered an abundant supply of food. The peaceful Pima and Maricopa farmers who lived and farmed nearby sold supplies to travelers and migrants.

The most prosperous period of time for Maricopa Wells was in the 1870s. During this time the trading center at the Wells provided water and food for not only the east–west travelers, but those who traveled to the north to Phoenix. Fairly good roads had been built by James A. Moore, the proprietor at Maricopa Wells, to all points north.

Maricopaville developed south and west of the Wells, following construction of a railroad line from this terminus to Phoenix. In 1879, the Southern Pacific Railroad was in the process of building a railroad line from Yuma to Tucson, and a second railroad line was to be built from Maricopaville, wrapping around the western edge of South Mountain into Phoenix. With the railroad, Maricopaville took on the appearance of a gold rush boom town, as men worked day and night building hotels, saloons, warehouses, restaurants, theaters, and other facilities. One local newspaper at the time believed that with its thousands of people and good location, Maricopaville would be an ideal choice for the location of the state capital. But the railroad never built the anticipated line from Maricopaville into Phoenix. Tempe also wanted to be on the railroad line and lobbied the territorial government for a stop; officials agreed.

In the early 1880s, the settlement was essentially rebuilt as Maricopa Junction, three miles to the east, at the present location of Maricopa, in order to accommodate the Maricopa and Phoenix Railroad, which was planned to go through Kyrene and Tempe to the north on the way to Phoenix. The first train departed from Maricopa for Phoenix on July 4, 1887. All east–west rail travelers had to stop at Maricopa, and those who wanted to go north had to shift to the M & P Railroad.

Maricopa was officially incorporated as a city on October 15, 2003, becoming the 88th incorporated municipality in Arizona. Between 2000 and 2010, the city's population grew from 1,040 residents to 43,482, an increase of 4080%. In 2018, estimates by the US Census Bureau and Arizona State Demographer's Office put Maricopa's population at 51,977, pushing the city over the 50,000 mark for the first time.

Data from the 2020 Census put Maricopa's population at 58,125, surpassing Casa Grande to become the most populous incorporated place in Pinal County and second most populous place in the county overall, behind the unincorporated San Tan Valley (incorporated as of 2025). Population of Maricopa has continued to grow, reaching 66,290 residents as of 2022; a 6.2% increase from 2021, making Maricopa the 12th fastest growing municipality in the United States and second fastest growing in Arizona (behind Queen Creek, which is partially in Pinal County).

A part of the city is within the boundaries of the Ak-Chin Indian Community. The small, federally recognized tribe has developed Harrah's Ak-Chin Casino and resort, cinema multiplex, and operates a golf course. All are open to the public and draw customers from Maricopa as well as the greater Phoenix area. In addition, the tribe operates the Ak-Chin Regional Airport and an industrial park. A 2011 study said that its casino and resort made up a large part of the economy of Pinal County, in terms of number of jobs and revenue generated.

== Geography and climate ==
Maricopa is located at 33°3′24″N 112°2′48″W (33.056702, -112.046656).

According to the United States Census Bureau, the city has a total area of 31.9 square miles (83 km^{2}), all land.

The topography in Maricopa is flat, with several mountain ranges 10 to 20 miles away. The elevation of Maricopa is 1190 feet.

Climate data for Maricopa, AZ
Month	Jan	Feb	Mar	Apr	May	Jun	Jul	Aug	Sep	Oct	Nov	Dec	Year
Record high °F (°C)	86 (30)	90 (32)	100 (38)	106 (41)	113 (45)	122 (50)	124 (51)	117 (47)	113 (45)	109 (43)	95 (35)	84 (29)	124 (51)
Mean daily maximum °F (°C)	68 (20)	73 (23)	79 (26)	88 (31)	98 (37)	107 (42)	108 (42)	106 (41)	102 (39)	90 (32)	77 (25)	67 (19)	89 (31)
Mean daily minimum °F (°C)	36 (2)	39 (4)	44 (7)	50 (10)	59 (15)	68 (20)	77 (25)	76 (24)	68 (20)	54 (12)	42 (6)	35 (2)	54 (12)
Average precipitation inches (mm)	0.83 (21)	0.91 (23)	1.00 (25)	0.28 (7.1)	0.17 (4.3)	0.08 (2.0)	0.98 (25)	0.96 (24)	0.72 (18)	0.47 (12)	0.58 (15)	0.97 (25)	7.98 (203)
Source: The Weather Channel

== Demographics ==
Historical population
Census	Pop.	Note	%±
2000	1,040		—
2010	43,482		4,081.0%
2020	58,125		33.7%
2024 (est.)	76,654	▲	31.9%
U.S. Decennial Census

=== Racial and ethnic composition ===
Maricopa city, Arizona – Racial composition Note: the US Census treats Hispanic/Latino as an ethnic category. This table excludes Latinos from the racial categories and assigns them to a separate category. Hispanics/Latinos may be of any race.
Race (NH = Non-Hispanic)	% 2020	% 2010	% 2000	Pop 2020	Pop 2010	Pop 2000
White alone (NH)	49.4%	57.7%	20.9%	28,735	25,084	217
Black alone (NH)	11.9%	9.2%	2.7%	6,901	3,987	28
American Indian alone (NH)	1.8%	1.5%	5%	1,042	638	52
Asian alone (NH)	2.8%	3.9%	0%	1,609	1,705	0
Pacific Islander alone (NH)	0.5%	0.3%	0%	287	114	0
Other race alone (NH)	0.6%	0.1%	0.3%	351	63	3
Multiracial (NH)	5.2%	2.9%	0.8%	3,035	1,274	8
Hispanic/Latino (any race)	27.8%	24.4%	70.4%	16,165	10,617	732

=== 2020 census ===
As of the 2020 census, Maricopa had a population of 58,125. The median age was 36.5 years. 28.4% of residents were under the age of 18 and 14.5% of residents were 65 years of age or older. For every 100 females there were 95.9 males, and for every 100 females age 18 and over there were 92.4 males age 18 and over.

98.3% of residents lived in urban areas, while 1.7% lived in rural areas.

There were 18,934 households in Maricopa, of which 41.1% had children under the age of 18 living in them. Of all households, 59.3% were married-couple households, 13.1% were households with a male householder and no spouse or partner present, and 19.2% were households with a female householder and no spouse or partner present. About 15.1% of all households were made up of individuals and 5.9% had someone living alone who was 65 years of age or older.

There were 20,955 housing units, of which 9.6% were vacant. The homeowner vacancy rate was 1.9% and the rental vacancy rate was 5.4%.

Racial composition as of the 2020 census
Race	Number	Percent
White	32,522	56.0%
Black or African American	7,229	12.4%
American Indian and Alaska Native	1,397	2.4%
Asian	1,689	2.9%
Native Hawaiian and Other Pacific Islander	313	0.5%
Some other race	6,089	10.5%
Two or more races	8,886	15.3%
Hispanic or Latino (of any race)	16,165	27.8%

=== 2010 census ===
As of the census of 2010, there were 43,482 people, 14,359 households, and 11,110 families residing in the city. The population density was 1,356.8 inhabitants per square mile (523.9/km^{2}). There were 17,240 housing units at an average density of 540.4 per square mile (208.6/km^{2}). The racial makeup of the city was 70.2% White, 9.7% Black or African American, 2.0% Native American, 4.1% Asian, 0.3% Pacific Islander, 8.5% from other races, and 5.3% from two or more races. 24.4% of the population is Hispanic or Latino of any race.

There were 14,359 households, out of which 47.1% had children under the age of 18 living with them, 37.5% were married couples living together, 10.9% had a female householder with no husband present, and 22.6% were non-families. 15.6% of all households were made up of individuals, and 2.5% had someone living alone who was 65 years of age or older. The average household size was 3.03 and the average family size was 3.38.

In the city, the population was spread out, with 32.5% under the age of 18, 6.2% from 18 to 24, 35% from 25 to 44, 19.8% from 45 to 64, and 6.5% who were 65 years of age or older. The median age was 31.2 years. For every 100 females, there were 98.5 males. For every 100 females age 18 and over, there were 94.8 males.

=== 2009 estimates ===
According to 2009 Census Bureau estimates, the median income for a household in the city was $67,692, and the median income for a family was $69,818. The per capita income for the city was $27,618. About 3.7% of families and 5.2% of the population were below the poverty line.

== Infrastructure ==
=== Roads ===
Maricopa is primarily served by Arizona State Route 347, a north–south highway that connects to Interstate 10, approximately 14 miles north of Maricopa, as well as Arizona State Route 84 11 miles south of Maricopa. State Route 84 then ends at Interstate 8 approximately 6 miles west of State Route 347. Within Maricopa, State Route 347 is John Wayne Parkway. As it leaves the city for the Gila River Indian Community to the north or the Ak-Chin Indian Community to the south, the road changes names to Maricopa Road. A portion of old State Route 347 within Maricopa also exists as Maricopa Road.

Maricopa is also served by Arizona State Route 238, which connects Maricopa to the town of Mobile, which is incorporated into the city of Goodyear. Past Mobile, State Route 238 becomes a county route that connects to Arizona State Route 85 in Gila Bend. State Route 238 and Mobile Road designations are used interchangeably. State Route 238 ends at State Route 347, and continues east as Smith-Enke Road, a major east–west corridor for the city of Maricopa. Maricopa-Casa Grande Highway also makes up a major corridor for the city, connecting it to the city of Casa Grande. This road parallels the Union Pacific Railroad at a diagonal, ultimately becoming Plainview Street within Maricopa and Cottonwood Lane in Casa Grande.

=== Rail ===
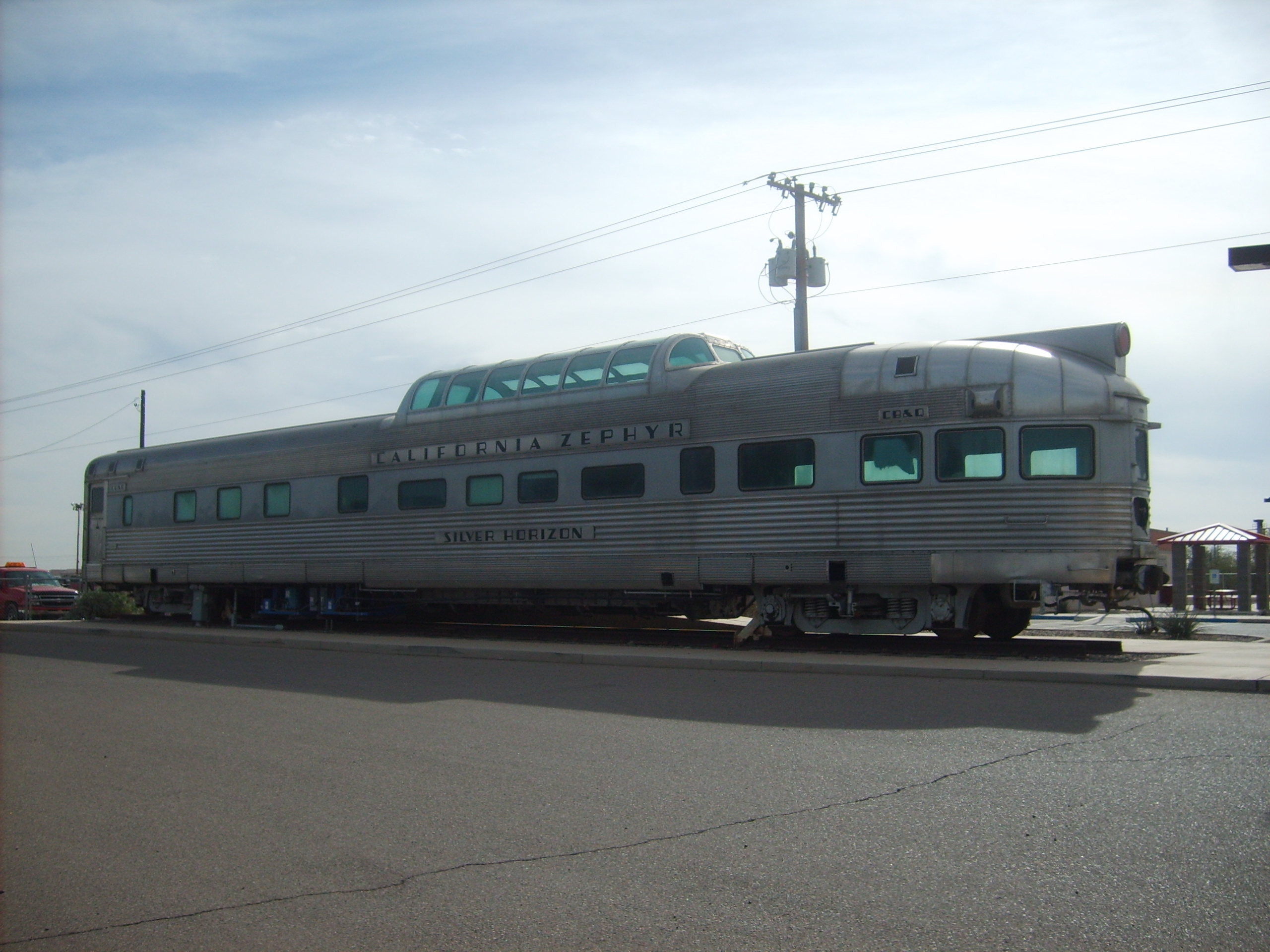
California Zephyr railcar at the Maricopa, AZ Amtrak station

Maricopa is located on a Union Pacific Railroad line. The city is currently the closest stop to Phoenix served by Amtrak's Sunset Limited and Texas Eagle trains. Maricopa station opened in 2001, originally in a converted passenger rail car but now in a metal building. Amtrak Thruway offers connecting service between Maricopa and Phoenix.

=== Utilities ===
Maricopa is served by the following utilities:

- Cable: Orbitel Communications
- Electricity: Electrical District #3
- Natural Gas: Southwest Gas
- Telephone/DSL: CenturyLink
- Water: Global Water (Santa Cruz Water Company, Palo Verde Utilities), Maricopa Domestic Water Improvement District

=== Bus ===
The City of Maricopa operates Maricopa Express Transit (MET), which provides local bus service.

== Municipal organization ==
Maricopa is governed by a Council-Manager form of government. This type of government structure combines the political leadership of elected officials with the managerial experience of an appointed professional manager. The City Council and City Manager work as partners to direct and guide local government.

The Maricopa City Council consists of the Mayor and six City Council members. The Mayor is elected to serve a four-year term and the City Council members are elected to serve four-year terms on a rotating basis. City Council meetings are held on the first and third Tuesdays of the month.

There are 10 citizen advisory groups that guide the Maricopa City Council on a myriad of activity. They are the Board of Adjustment, Heritage District Advisory Committee, Industrial Development Authority Board, Merit Board, Parks, Recreation and Library Advisory Committee, Planning and Zoning Commission, Public Safety Personnel Retirement System Board, Transportation Advisory Committee and the Youth Council. Selection to these groups is by City Council action.

The city is organized into nine departments: the City Manager's Office, the City Clerk's Office, Community Services, Development Services, Economic Development, Finance, Fire, Human Services and the Police Department. More than 250 individuals work for the municipality.

== Civic and nonprofit organizations ==
- F.O.R. Maricopa - local food bank
- Maricopa Historical Society - historical organization
- Maricopa Seniors - area senior citizen group
- Pet Social Worker / Tails of Hope Rescue - local animal rescue group
- Recycling Association of Maricopa (R.A.M.) - community drop-off recycling
- Thunderbird Arena Community Council (TACC) - area organization supporting the renovation of the Thunderbird Farms Arena
- Maha Ganpati Temple of Arizona - Hindu Temple with Rajagopuram[main tower] built as per Dravidian architecture of South India.
- The Opportunity Tree - nonprofit program for children and adults with intellectual and developmental disabilities.

== Education facilities ==
=== Public school districts ===
- Maricopa Unified School District
- Mobile Elementary School District

=== Public elementary schools ===
- Butterfield Elementary School
- Maricopa Elementary School
- Mobile Elementary School
- Pima Butte Elementary School
- Saddleback Elementary School
- Santa Cruz Elementary School
- Santa Rosa Elementary School

=== Public middle schools ===
- Desert Wind Middle School
- Maricopa Wells Middle School

=== Public K-8 Schools ===
- Alma Farrel Innovation Academy

=== Public high schools ===
- Desert Sunrise High School
- Maricopa High School

=== Charter schools ===
- Leading Edge Academy Maricopa
- Legacy Traditional School-Maricopa Campus
- A+ Charter Schools
- Heritage Academy Maricopa

=== Community college ===
- Central Arizona College

== Notable people ==
- Former state senator Steve Smith resides in Maricopa
- Charles Smith, lawman, friend of Wyatt Earp
- John Wayne, movie star, owned land in the area and frequented local establishments
