= Mobile, Arizona =

Community in Maricopa County, Arizona

Sonoran Valley, Goodyear, Arizona
- Goodyear Planning Area
- Nicknames: Mobile, Arizona
- Location of Mobile in Maricopa County
- Coordinates: 33°3′19″N 112°16′16″W
- Country: United States
- State: Arizona
- County: Maricopa
- Time zone: UTC-7 (Mountain (MST))

Sonoran Valley, also referred to as Mobile, is a community in the southern planning area of Goodyear, Maricopa County, Arizona, United States. It is situated about 35 miles southwest of Phoenix, Arizona, and has a population of less than 100. Sonoran Valley is also home to a number of landfills. Lufthansa operates a private airport to the north of Sonoran Valley, used for pilot training by student pilots of Lufthansa Flight Training, All Nippon Airways and KLM being based in Goodyear. Its ICAO airport code is 1AZ0, and features ILS on runway 9.

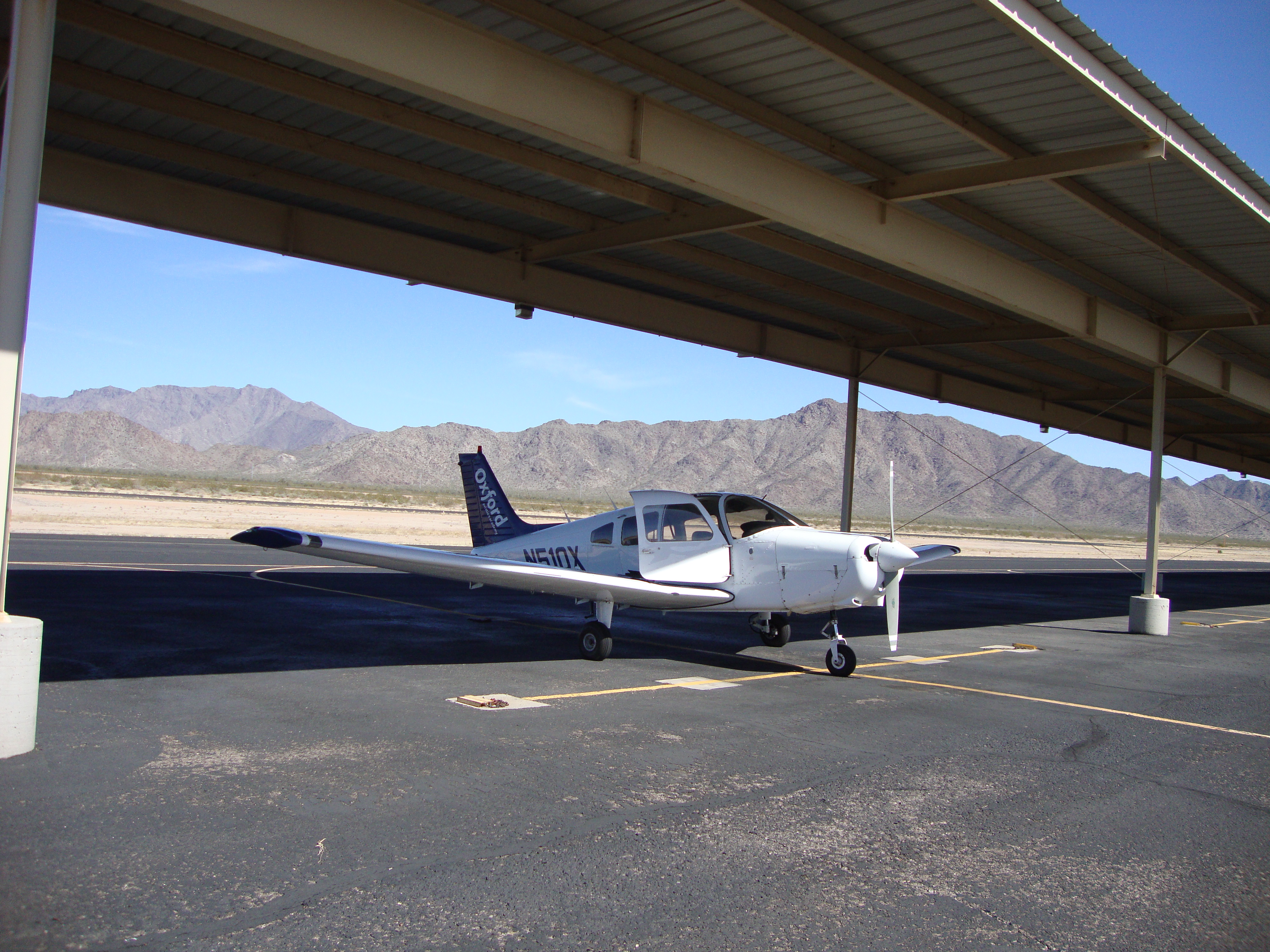
Piper PA-28 Warrior of Oxford Aviation Academy on Mobile "Lufthansa pvt" Airfield's ramp

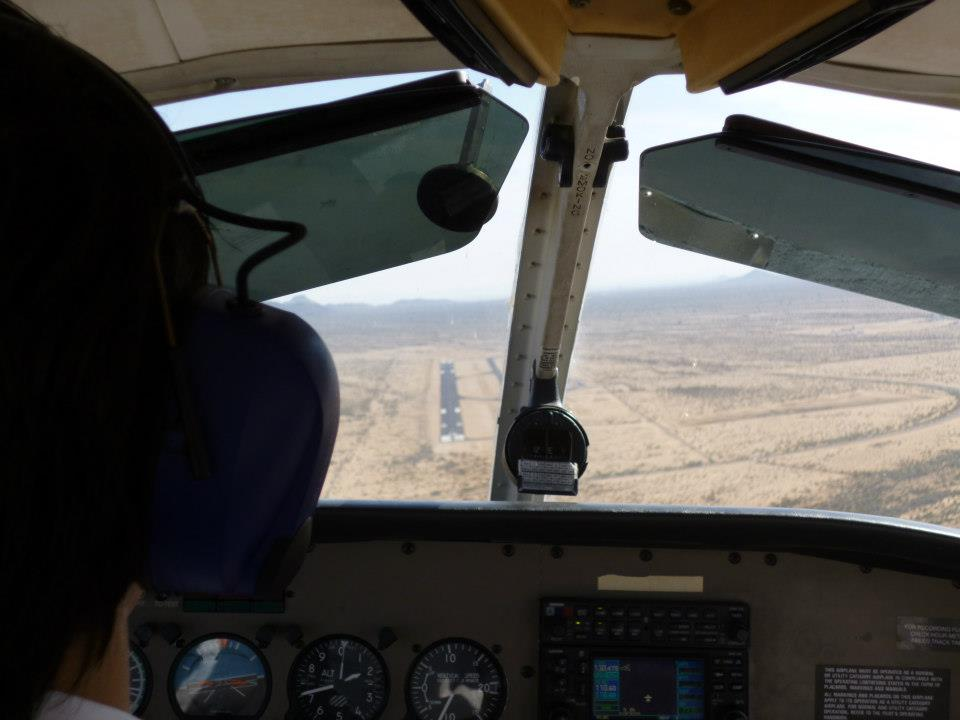
Piper PA-28 Warrior of Oxford Aviation Academy approaching Mobile "Lufthansa pvt" Airfield

== History ==
Mobile was founded in the 1930s as an area for African Americans to live. Notable African-American woman of Mobile, Rebecca Dallis, taught in Casa Grande c. 1939. Local lore has it that some of its early residents were African Americans from Mobile, Alabama. However, researchers have found that railroad companies referred to the area as "Mobile" almost a decade before the first permanent settler in the area in the 1920s. In the 1930s, two railroad cars were used for two separate schoolhouses (one black and one for whites), and the population of local homesteaders reached about 100. By the 1950s the town was booming with almost 400 inhabitants, but the lack of employment, running water and educational facilities (no education past 8th grade) led to the exodus of most of the original residents and their descendants.

In 2007, Sonoran Valley was annexed into the city of Goodyear as part of a 67 square miles (170 km^{2}) expansion, part of an agreement with Montage Holdings, a local developer, to develop a planned community in the area. The planned community, named Amaranth, envisioned as a self-sustaining community with a regional mall, employment centers and eventually home to over 50,000 people, has been placed on hold until at least 2010 due to economic slowdown. The delay, as well as the developer's inability to meet financial obligations to the city, has forced Goodyear to cut back on emergency services to the area.

== Geography ==
Sonoran Valley is located at geographical coordinates 33° 3' 19" N 112° 16' 16" W (33.055301, -112.271102). The private airstrip is located at 33° 6'43.27"N 112°16'8.66"W (33.111720, -112.269517).

== Transportation ==
Sonoran Valley is accessible by car from State Route 238.
