= Sahuarita Air Force Range =

Former training range in Pima County, Arizona

Sahuarita Air Force Range
- Sahuarita, Arizona, United States
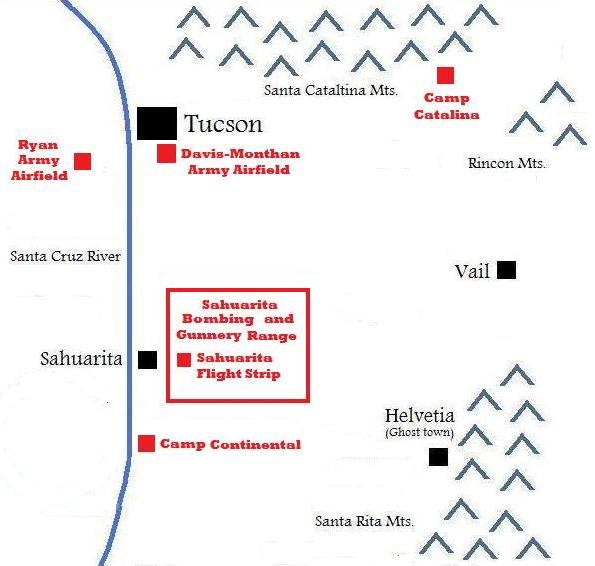
- Military installations in the Tucson area during World War II.

Site information
- Type: Training ground
- Controlled by: United States

Location
- Coordinates: 31.97°N 110.88°W

Site history
- Built: 1942
- In use: 1942–1978

Garrison information
- Occupants: United States Army (1942–1947); United States Air Force (1947–1978)

The Sahuarita Air Force Range, also known as the Sahuarita Bombing & Gunnery Range, was built just east of Sahuarita, Arizona, in 1942. It was used for the training of bombardiers, aerial gunners, anti-aircraft gunners, and others during World War II and the Korean War. The abandoned Sahuarita Flight Strip (31°57′50″N 110°55′29″W) is located in the southwestern corner of the range, and was used as an emergency flight strip until 1978. Before deactivation, the airspace over the range was protected by its own restricted area, R-310.

== History ==
The range was completed by April 1942, shortly after the United States joined in the war, and was called the Sahuarita Bombing & Gunnery Range. It was located approximately twenty miles southeast of Tucson and about two miles east of Sahuarita. The range itself spanned 27,045-acres and consisted of multiple large round targets made of stone. Most of the range was located east of the town, although some areas that are now part of Sahuarita's northern end were also used. The Sahuarita Flight Strip wasn't opened until 1943. Before that time, the air crewmen who used the facility were flying out of Davis-Monthan Army Airfield. The Sahuarita airfield had twelve buildings and other structures, observation towers, a 5,540-foot paved runway, utility lines, and a range for radio-controlled aircraft operations.

After World War II ended, the range was closed, but in 1950 it was reopened again and renamed the Sahuarita Air Force Range. Most of those who used the range at this time were bomber crews flying out of Carswell Air Force Base in Texas. After the Korean War, the Strategic Air Command kept the airfield in service as an emergency flight strip, even though it was "dangerously close" to the targets used for training. In 1978, the range was finally closed when the federal government released the lands to the public. The land is now owned by the State of Arizona, which has leased most of it to a cattle rancher. It was noted that in 1978, 2,550 acres of the range were cleared of explosive ordnance.

Today, the site of the airfield is occupied by Walden Grove High School and the adjacent Sahuarita Park, although most of the flight strip remains intact. There have been "only a few" bombs found on the range over the years, as well as other objects that resemble bombs, but most of the bombs dropped by the military were actually "dummies," which were filled with sand. However, officials from the Army Corps of Engineers say that there is still a chance that unexploded ordnance remains buried in the ground. Lloyd Godard, a project manager with the Corps of Engineers' Los Angeles regional office, said: "On any bombing range, there's always a chance that things could have gone under the surface... High explosives were used on one of the Sahuarita range target areas."

== Gallery ==
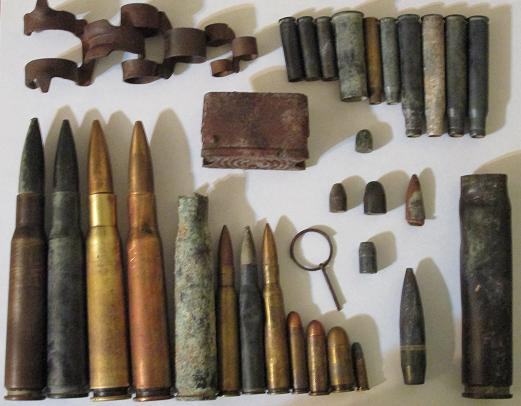
Artifacts found at the former Sahuarita Air Force Range, including a 20 mm anti-aircraft gun casing and belt link, M2 bullets and casings, M1919 bullets, casings, and a machine gun belt link, M1 Garand bullets, casings, and a stripper clip, M1 Carbine bullets and casings, M1911 bullets and casings, a .22 bullet and casing, some unidentified casings, and an Mk 2 grenade pin.

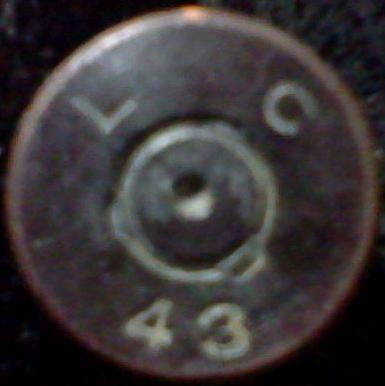
Headstamp of a .50 caliber bullet casing made at the Lake City Army Ammunition Plant in 1943.

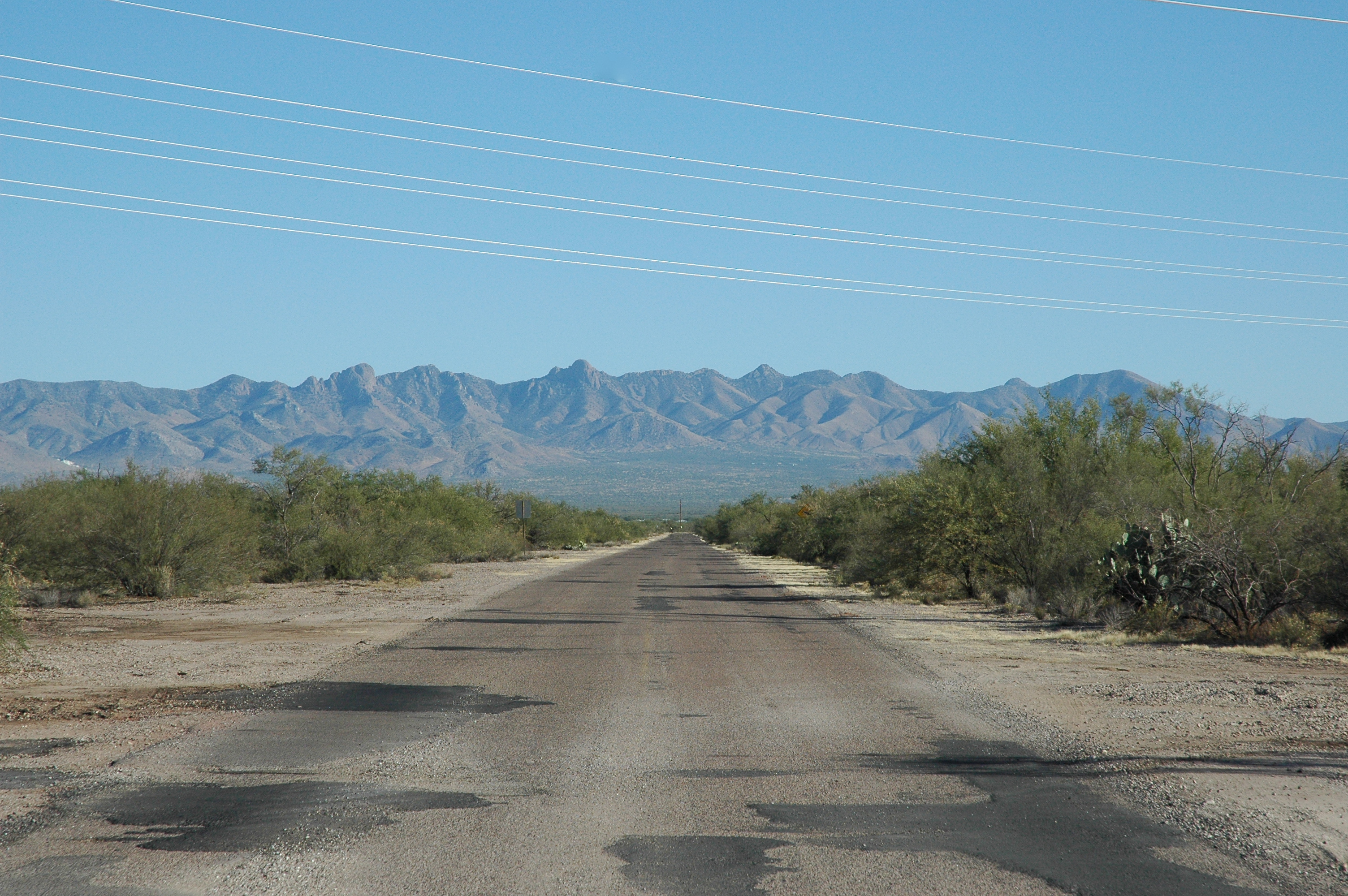
The Sahuarita Flight Strip in 2007, facing southeast towards the Santa Rita Mountains.

== See also ==
- Arizona during World War II
- Arizona World War II Army Airfields
