= Walden Grove High School =

Location
- 15510 S. Sahuarita Park Rd; Sahuarita, Arizona 85629; United States; 31°58′12″N 110°55′59″W

Information
- Type: Public high school
- Motto: Be More Than You Think You Are
- Established: 2011 (15 years ago)
- School district: Sahuarita Unified School District
- CEEB code: 030731
- Principal: TBD
- Teaching staff: 50.50 (FTE)
- Grades: 9-12
- Enrollment: 1,154 (2023–2024)
- Student to teacher ratio: 22.85
- Colors: Cardinal and white
- Mascot: Red Wolves
- Website: wghs.susd30.us

Walden Grove High School is the second comprehensive high school in the town of Sahuarita, Arizona, operated by the Sahuarita Unified School District. It opened in August 2011 to freshmen and sophomores. The school opened with an enrollment of over 400 freshmen and sophomores and currently has approximately 1112 students.

== History ==
Sahuarita High School had 1,502 students as of October 1, 2010, taking it some 250 students over its state-listed capacity. The overcrowding, a consequence of the meteoric 679% growth of Sahuarita in the 2000s –growth that added 2,200 students to the Sahuarita Unified School District from July 2005 to early 2011— another high school was clearly needed.

Some 20 suggestions were given for the name of the school, such as Ravenswood; Copper Hills; Madera Canyon; and Hohokam. The name Walden Grove was chosen, partly because the Walden family, through their Farmer's Investment Company, donated the land for the school. The Waldens grow pecans on much of their land.

The mascot is the Red Wolves, which was determined by a vote of students that would be attending Walden Grove in its first year. It had originally been planned that the students would choose school colors, but construction moved so quickly on the school that the construction company was starting to ask for school colors so that it could order items such as the gymnasium floor.

Construction began toward the end of March 2010. Core Construction was the contractor. It cost $25.99 million to build Walden Grove; $3.3 million of that came from taxpayer-approved bonds, and the remainder was supplied by the Arizona School Facilities Board.

A time capsule was buried on campus on May 25, 2011. It will be opened in 2061.

Upon opening, Walden Grove became the new home of the district's robotics program, and upperclassmen began to commute to Walden Grove from Sahuarita to participate. It also is a first for the district in honors English courses for freshmen and sophomores, which Sahuarita would not offer until 2012. The second floor of the school was not used in the first year of operation.

Based on the major population growth predicted for the long-term, the Sahuarita school board plans to build a third comprehensive high school in Sahuarita for 2017, though it is not funded.

The school began varsity sports in 2012 with independent schedules; the 2013-2014 seasons will find it placed into more normal scheduling as the Arizona Interscholastic Association begins a new two-year scheduling block.

On May 22, 2014, Walden Grove celebrated its first ever graduation.
