= Sun Tran =

Public transit system serving Tucson, Arizona

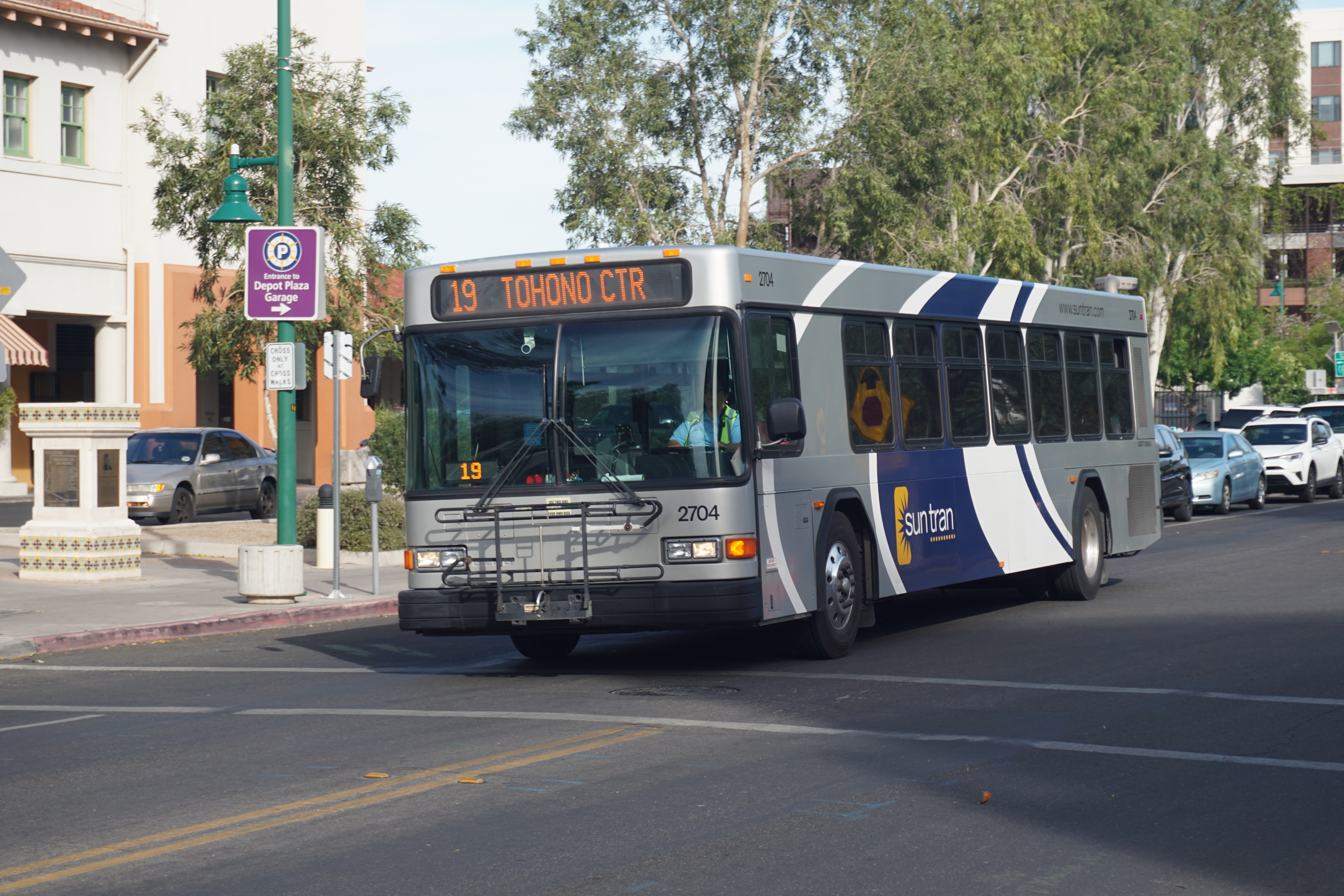
- Parent: City of Tucson
- Founded: 1969
- Headquarters: 3920 N. Sun Tran Blvd
- Locale: Tucson, Arizona
- Service type: Bus; Streetcar; Paratransit
- Routes: 42 bus routes (29 regular & 13 express); 1 streetcar line
- Stops: 2,200+
- Stations: 3
- Fleet: 189 buses 139 cutaway vans 8 streetcars
- Daily ridership: 58,900 (weekdays, Q1 2026)
- Annual ridership: 18,315,300 (2025)
- Fuel type: Biodiesel, Biodiesel-Urea, CNG
- Operator: Fixed-Route, Sun Link: Tucson Transit Management, (RATP Dev)/ Sun Shuttle: Total Transit, Ajo Transportation
- Website: suntran.com

Sun Tran is the public transit system serving the city of Tucson, Arizona. In 2025, the system had 18,315,300 rides, or about 58,900 per weekday as of the first quarter of 2026. 100% of the fleet utilizes clean-burning fuels, such as compressed natural gas (CNG), biodiesel, and hybrid technologies. In addition to more than 40 bus routes, the system also includes the Sun Link modern streetcar line.

== History ==
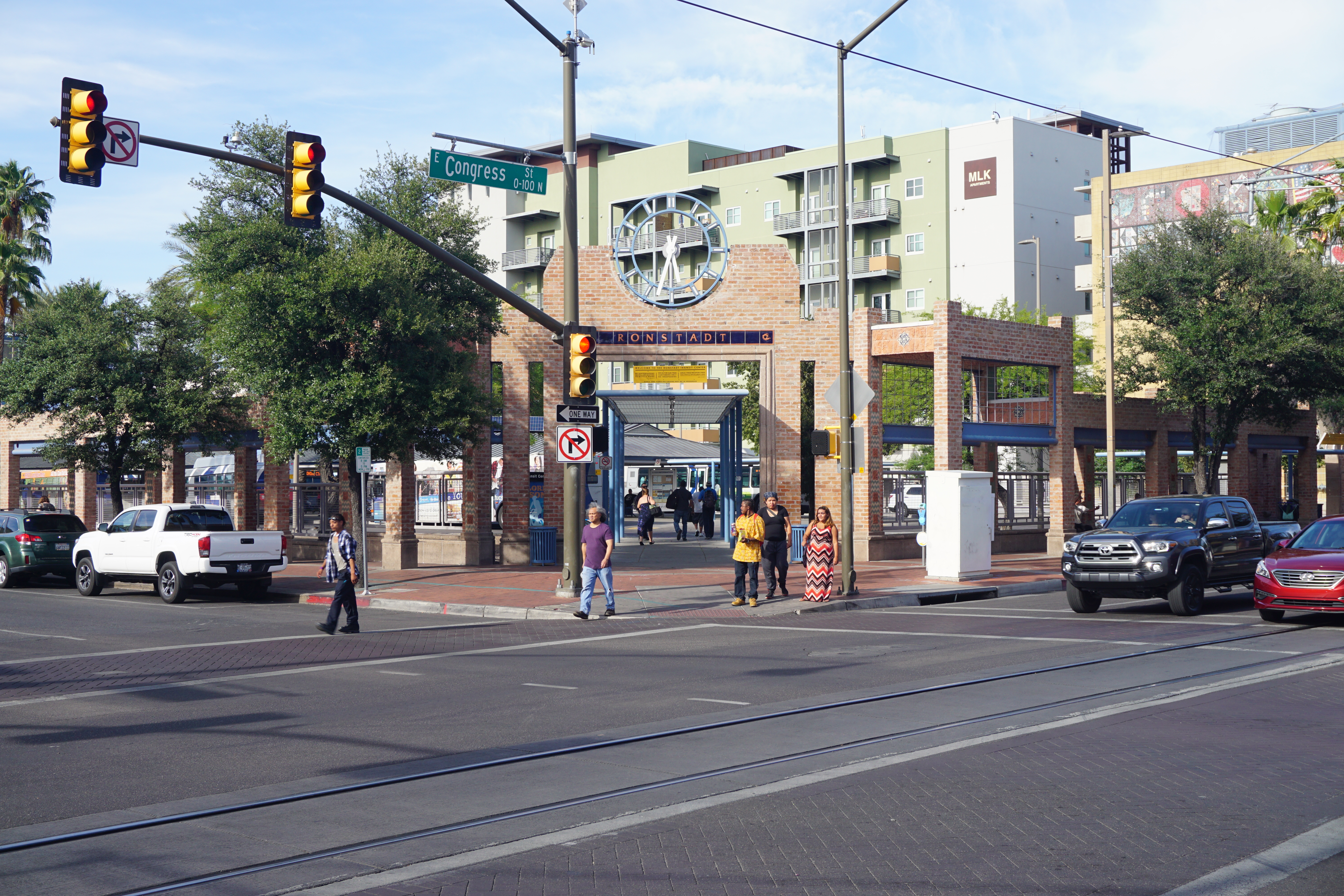
Ronstadt Transit Center in 2019

=== Predecessors ===
According to David Leighton, historian for the Arizona Daily Star newspaper, Sun Tran's history began in 1897 with the organization of the Tucson Street Railway, which by the following year was providing Tucsonans with regular mule-powered streetcar service. Streetcar tracks existed in parts of present-day downtown and to the University of Arizona. Within a few years, lack of profit caused the company to be sold and it was reorganized as Tucson Rapid Transit Co. (TRT). It shortly came under common ownership with Tucson Gas, Electric Light and Power Co.

By 1906, mules were replaced by electricity as the driving force behind the streetcars in Tucson. Four years later, TRT published its intent to increase the amount of track for its electric cars but insufficient money prevented this from occurring. In 1910, TRT owner United States Light and Traction was acquired by the newly formed Federal Light and Traction.

In October 1925, Tucson Rapid Transit Co., having realized that buses were more flexible and economical to run than streetcars and were the future of public transportation in the Old Pueblo, bought the White Star Bus Line. This small bus company would become the basis for TRT's bus service in town. Also around the same time, Roy Laos Sr., noting the lack of transit service to the south and west sides of town founded the Occidental Bus Line to serve these areas. Laos' bus service would later be called Old Pueblo Transit.

In 1930, control of Federal Light and Traction was acquired by Cities Service. On January 1, 1931, Tucson Rapid Transit formally ended all electric streetcar service in town. From this day forward it became strictly a bus company. Five years later, Jacob M. Bingham established the Mountain View Bus Line with one bus. His goal was to provide service to outlying areas that TRT didn't serve but turning a profit or even just paying his bills was difficult and soon enough TRT bought his small enterprise.

During World War II, ridership increased to a large degree, in part due to tire and fuel rationing that was carried out to support the war effort. The secondary reason for the surge was the need for public transportation for workers in the growing defense industry.

After the passage of the Public Utility Holding Company Act of 1935, Federal Light and Traction/Cities Service was forced to sell most of their operations. TRT was sold to W. Culver White, John B. Tigrett, A.V. Lindseth and L.A. Tanner. Tucson Gas & Electric was sold in a public offering.

In late 1951, the Hughes Missile Plant (now called Raytheon Missiles & Defense) was finished and was operating with a small number of employees. Competition for ridership to the new factory between Old Pueblo Transit and Tucson Rapid Transit became heated and OPT filed an injunction in court to prevent TRT from providing service for employees. Early the following year, the Arizona Corporation Commission decided against OPT and allowed TRT to also provide bus service to the plant.

=== Founding ===
The 1950s and 1960s saw a steady decline in riders for Tucson Rapid Transit. Even a change in ownership in 1965 to American Transit Corp. (and a name change to Tucson Transit Corp.) and the installation of air conditioners seemed to do little for the failing bus service. As a result, in 1969, the City of Tucson acquired TTC, changing the name to the City of Tucson Transit System.

In 1975, a contest was held to give a new name to the bus system, with Benjamin Rios, a 25-year-old University of Arizona architecture student from Mexico, submitting the winning entry: “Sun Tran.” His prize was a $150 portable television.

Three years later, Sun Tran bought its competition the Old Pueblo Transit Co. and the city had but one bus service for riders. The year 1987 saw the opening of the Roy Laos Transit Center at 205 W Irvington Road, and in 1991, the Ronstadt Transit Center opened in downtown, named for historic Tucson business leader Federico José María Ronstadt.

=== Unification ===
On January 22, 2009, a regional seamless transit system was unveiled that helps to better unify the various public transit services in and around the Tucson metropolitan area. One change was the renaming of several of the services under the "Sun" moniker: the Sun Tran express bus routes become Sun Express; Van Tran (paratransit) becomes Sun Van, circulator routes in outlying areas become Sun Connect, and RideShare (carpooling) becomes Sun RideShare. Along with this name change comes a new logo and color scheme, replacing the old red, yellow, and white with a blue, yellow, silver, and white livery. The new livery was introduced into service on February 16, 2009, with the addition of 47 new Sun Tran buses and 42 Sun Van (formerly Van Tran) paratransit vehicles to the fleet.

Sun Connect service started on May 4, 2009, under the name Sun Shuttle, with routes that serve the communities of Casas Adobes, Tucson Estates, Ajo, Oro Valley, Rita Ranch, Marana, Avra Valley, Tohono O'odham Nation, Green Valley, and Sahuarita.These transit services are operated by the Regional Transportation Authority of Pima County (RTA).

In 2010, Sun Tran received shipment of its first bus using hybrid technology and two years later Sun Tran's Northwest Bus Facility located at 3920 N. Sun Tran Blvd was completed.

In summer of 2023, Sun Tran released their Comprehensive Operational Analysis, a pseudo bus network redesign that would increase frequency, realigning and extending routes and improving access and quality of service.

== Services ==
=== Sun Tran ===
Sun Tran operates 29 regular fixed bus routes. Most routes provide service from 6 am to 11 pm. A few routes provide service until midnight. Sun Tran does not provide overnight service.

==== Current routes ====
Route No.	Route Name	Termini			Major Streets/Areas Serviced	Notes
1	Glenn/Swan	Ronstadt Transit Center, Downtown	↔	Swan Road/29th Street	Downtown, Main Gate Square, University of Arizona, Park Avenue, Glenn Street, Swan Road.	Route was restructured in 2015 and service on 29th St was eliminated.
2	Tucson Marketplace	Banner University Medical Center-Southern Campus	↔	Ronstadt Transit Center, Downtown	Irvington Road, Country Club Road, Campbell Avenue, 36th Street, Pueblo Gardens, Downtown.	
3	6th St./Wilmot	Pima Community College (PCC) East	↔	Pima Community College (PCC) West	Stella Road, Wilmot Road, 5th Street, 6th Street, University of Arizona, Downtown, St Mary's Road, Anklam Road.	
4	Speedway	Broadway/Houghton Park & Ride (1st segment); Udall Transit Station (2nd segment)	↔	Ronstadt Transit Center, Downtown	Speedway Boulevard, Harrison Road, Kolb Road, University of Arizona, Downtown.	Route 4 rerouted from Golf Links/Kolb Park & Ride to Udall Transit Station in 2026
5	Pima/W. Speedway	Udall Transit Station	↔	Pima Community College (PCC) West	West Speedway Boulevard, University of Arizona, Pima Street, Tanque Verde Road, Udall Park.	
6	Euclid Ave./N. 1st Ave.	Ronstadt Transit Center, Downtown	↔	Tohono Tadai Transit Center	Downtown, Main Gate Square, University of Arizona, Euclid Avenue, 1st Avenue.	Original Route 6 was restructured and split into Route 6 and Route 25 in 2015.
7	22nd St.	Broadway/Houghton Park & Ride	↔	Ronstadt Transit Center, Downtown	Downtown, 22nd Street	
8	Broadway	Ronstadt Transit Center, Downtown	↔	Broadway/Houghton Park & Ride	Downtown, Broadway Boulevard	Original Route 8 was restructured in 2015 and was split into Route 8 and Route 18.; Route 8 was restructed again in 2026 to merge with 108X and eliminate Udall Transit Station branch, with all trips traveling to Broadway/Houghton Park & Ride.
9	Grant	Pima Community College (PCC) West	↔	Pima Community College (PCC) West	Grant Road, Kolb Road	Route 9 was merged with the former Route 20 in 2016, to create a continuous route on Grant Road.; Route 9 no longer services the University of Arizona and Downtown.; Route 9 was rerouted from Udall Transit Station to Pima Community College in 2026.
10	Ruthrauff	Davis Avenue/Ruthrauff Rd	↔	Ronstadt Transit Center, Downtown	Ruthrauff Rd, Romero Rd, River Road, Miracle Mile, Oracle Road, Downtown.	
11	Alvernon/Ajo	Ajo Way/Mission Road (1st segment); Tucson International Airport (2nd segment)	↔	Dodge Boulevard/River Road	Alvernon Way, Palo Verde Road, Ajo Way, Corona Road, Valencia Road, Tucson Airport.	Laos Transit Center branch merged with Route 50 in 2025, to create a continuous route along Ajo Way.
12	S. 12th Avenue	Los Reales Road/Nogales Highway	↔	Ronstadt Transit Center, Downtown	12th Avenue, 10th Avenue, South Tucson, Tucson Convention Center, Downtown.	Merged with Route 24 to become a circular in 2025.
15	Campbell	Banner University Medical Center-Southern Campus	↔	Tohono Tadai Transit Center	Roger Road, Campbell Avenue, University of Arizona, Eastland Street.	
16	Oracle/S. 6th Avenue	Laos Transit Center	↔	Tohono Tadai Transit Center	Downtown, Oracle Road, 6th Avenue	Original Route 16 was restructured in 2015, and it was split into Route 12 and Route 16. It was restructured once again in 2025, where service north of TTC was split into Route 62 and the remainder of the route was merged with Route 18.
17	Country Club/29th St.	Broadway/Houghton Park & Ride	↔	Tohono Transit Center	Harrison Road, Golf Links Road, 29th Street, Country Club Road, Prince Road, Flowing Wells Rd	
19	Stone	Ronstadt Transit Center, Downtown	↔	Tohono Tadai Transit Center	Stone Avenue, Downtown	
21	W. Congress/Silverbell	Ronstadt Transit Center, Downtown	↔	West Goret Road/Dales Crossing Drive	Silverbell Road, Congress Street, Downtown.	
23	Mission	Laos Transit Center	↔	Ronstadt Transit Center, Downtown	Irvington Road, Mission Road, 36th Street, Silverlake Road/29th Street, 4th Avenue, South Tucson, Downtown.	
25	S. Park Avenue	Tucson International Airport	↔	Ronstadt Transit Center, Downtown	Downtown, Park Avenue, Irvington Road, Tucson Airport.	
26	Benson Highway	Craycroft Road/Benson Highway	↔	Laos Transit Center	Valencia Road, Benson Highway, Drexel Road, Campbell Avenue, Irvington Road.	
27	Midvale/Valencia	Valencia Road/Camino De Oeste	↔	Laos Transit Center	Valencia Road, Cardinal Avenue, Drexel Road, Midvale Park Road, Santa Clara Avenue, 12th Avenue.	Route 27 frequency during peak hours was reduced to every 30 minutes in 2016.
29	Pasqua Yacui/UMC Banner South	Banner University Medical Center-Southern Campus	↔	Casino del Sol, AVA Amphitheater Park & Ride	6th Avenue, Valencia Road, Los Reales Road, Tetakusim Road, Pasqua Yaqui Pueblo.	
34	Craycroft/Ft. Lowell	Davis Monthan Air Force Base Visitor Center	↔	Tohono Tadai Transit Center	Davis Monthan Air Force Base, Craycroft Road, East Fort Lowell Road, North Stone Avenue.	
37	Pantano	Pima College (PCC) East; Amazon (Kolb Road/Valencia Road)	↔	Udall Transit Station	Pantano Road, Tanque Verde Road.	Route 37 buses do not stop on the 22nd Street segment.; Select trips serve Amazon at Kolb Road/Valencia Road.; Route 37 was restructured in 2016 to eliminate the segment north of Tanque Verde due to low demand.
61	La Cholla	Tohono Tadai Transit Center	↔	Foothills Mall Drive at La Cholla (in front of Walmart)	Wetmore Road, Auto Mall Drive, La Cholla Boulevard, Ina Road, Shannon Road.	
62	Ina Road	Tohono Tadai Transit Center	↔	Thornydale/Ina Roads (parking lot of Lowe's at Ina)	Ina Road	

=== Sun Express ===
Sun Trans operates 10 Sun Express routes, which offer limited-stop service on weekdays during peak commute hours.

==== Current routes ====
Route No.	Route Name	Termini			Areas/corridors served
Express Routes to and from Downtown
101X	Golf Links-Downtown Express	22nd Street/Harrison Road	→ AM ---- ← PM	Downtown Tucson	Golf Links Road, Downtown Tucson
103X	Northwest-UA Downtown Express	Ina Road/Camino de las Capas	→ AM ---- ← PM	Downtown Tucson	Ina Road, Oracle Road, River Road, Campbell Avenue, Speedway Boulevard, University of Arizona, Downtown Tucson.
105X	Foothills-Downtown Express	Sunrise/Kolb Roads	→ AM ---- ← PM	Downtown Tucson	Catalina Foothills, Swan Road, Speedway Boulevard, University of Arizona, Downtown Tucson.
107X	Oro Valley-Downtown Express	Rancho Vistoso Park & Ride	↔	Downtown Tucson	Oro Valley, Oracle Road, Downtown Tucson.
109X	Catalina Highway-Downtown Express	Catalina Highway/Tanque Verde Road	→ AM ---- ← PM	Downtown Tucson	Tanque Verde Road, 5th Street, University of Arizona, Downtown Tucson.
110X	Rita Ranch-Downtown Express	Downtown Tucson	↔	Old Vail Road Park & Ride	Downtown Tucson, University of Arizona Science & Technology Park, Rita Ranch.
124X	Northwest-Downtown Express	CDO Riverfront Park at Lambert Lane	→ AM ---- ← PM	Downtown Tucson	La Canada Drive, Ina Road, Marana, Downtown Tucson.
Express Routes to and from Aero Park
201X	Eastside-Aero Park Express	Harrison/Golf Links Roads	→ AM ---- ← PM	Aero Park, Raytheon	Tucson East side, Harrison Road, Speedway Boulevard, Alvernon Way, Palo Verde Road, Aero Park Area, Raytheon.
203X	Oro Valley-Aero Park Express	Rancho Vistoso Park & Ride	→ AM ---- ← PM	Aero Park, Raytheon	Oro Valley, Laos Transit Center, Aero Park Area, Raytheon.
204X	Northwest-Aero Park Express	Crossroads Park at Silverbell Road	→ AM ---- ← PM	Aero Park, Raytheon	Marana, Laos Transit Center, Aero Park Area, Raytheon.

=== Sun Link ===
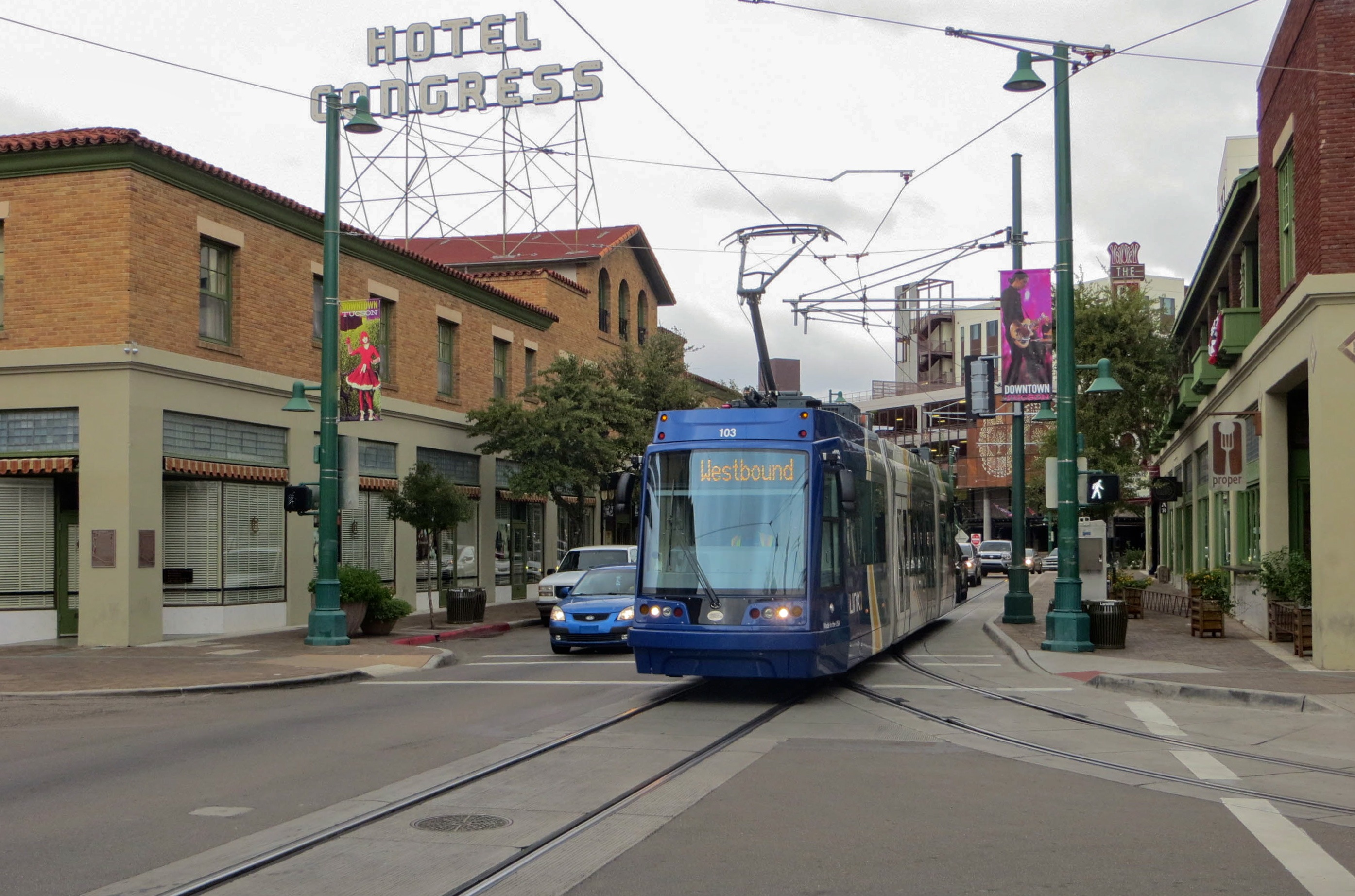
A Sun Link streetcar on Congress Street in 2014

Sun Link is a 3.9 mi (6.28 km) modern streetcar system that travels through the downtown area, connecting the main University of Arizona campus with the Mercado District on the western edge of downtown. Construction began in April 2012, with revenue service beginning in July 2014. The rolling stock is manufactured by Oregon-based United Streetcar.

Sun Link is double-tracked, replacing a single-track configuration previously used by Old Pueblo Trolley (OPT), a volunteer-run heritage streetcar operation, begun in 1993, mainly used by tourists and local patrons (including University of Arizona students) of the numerous small shops, bars and restaurants along the line. The maintenance facility is located just west of the OPT car barn and yard on 8th Street west of 4th Avenue. OPT last ran on October 31, 2011, when service was suspended for Sun Link construction; the plan was for Old Pueblo Trolley to share operations, trackage and stations with Sun Link, but no date has yet been set for OPT service to resume.

=== Sun Shuttle ===
Sun Tran operates 10 Sun Shuttle routes, which connect outlying neighborhoods to Sun Tran and Sun Express service. As of 2024, service in Ajo is operated by Ajo Transportation.

=== Sun Van ===
Sun Van is a paratransit service that offers alternative transportation for riders that are unable to use fixed-route buses because of a disability. Trips must be reserved 1-7 days in advance. In 2022, Sun Tran launched an app that allows riders to track their reserved shuttle in real time.

== Fares ==
All fares have been free since March 2020. Previously, the base fare was $1.75 and reduced fare was $0.75. The express bus fare was $2.35. No fares had applied to kids under 6 with fare-paying rider, limit 3. All fares used to be paid with a SunGo smart card, which can be loaded with cash value or passes. 24-hour passes & 30-day tickets were available. The University of Arizona provided discounted passes for eligible students, faculty and staff through the UA's Parking and Transportation Services.

== Fleet ==
Sun Tran has an active fleet of 126 buses. In 2008, Sun Tran signed a contract with Gillig to purchase 119 biodiesel buses. This was done to avoid the need to expand CNG fueling capacity at its depot. However, Sun Tran plans to replace all diesel buses with CNG buses by FY26.

Current fleet
Image	Builder and Model	Year	Length	Fuel	Number(s)	Quantity	Notes
	Gillig Low Floor	2006	40'	B5 Biodiesel	2601-2612	12	These buses have a different seating configuration compared to the 2005 Gillig buses, as seats are all arranged lengthwise (except for the last row of seats). This was done to reduce vandalism that has been caused to bus windows and the interior.
	Gillig Low Floor BRT	2008–2009	40'	B5 Biodiesel	2901-2936	36	These buses, labeled "Sun Express", are used on express routes 101X-312X, and occasionally as shuttles for special events. Features include head rests, reclining seats, and heat resistant windows.
	Gillig Low Floor	2009	40'	B5 Biodiesel	2937-2950, 3001-3010	14	The 29XX buses (known as transition buses) are Low Floor, not BRT, and feature head rests and reclining seats. The rest (3001-3010) are regular Low Floor buses.
	Gillig Low Floor	2009	40'	B5 Biodiesel-Electric Hybrid	3000	1	First hybrid bus introduced in 2010. It featured a promotional livery until 2014 when it was painted with the same livery as the other regular buses.
	Gillig Low Floor	2011–2012	40'	B5 Biodiesel-Urea	3011, 3101-3156	57	These buses run with a blend of Biodiesel-5% Urea.
	Gillig Low Floor	2012	40'	B5 Biodiesel-Electric Hybrid	4001-4010	10	New hybrid buses placed in service at the end of December 2012.
	Gillig Low Floor	2014	40'	CNG	3201-3224	24	The majority of the buses will go into service by the end of August. These new buses will eventually replace the 14-year-old Nova buses.
	Gillig Low Floor	2014	35'	CNG	3225-3229	4	These new CNG buses are smaller (35-foot-long compared to the standard 40 feet) and have a total of 30 seats. These will replace the 14-year-old Nova buses.
	Gillig Low Floor	2014	40'	CNG	3230-3245	16	New CNG buses placed in service to replace the old CNG buses.
	Gillig Low Floor	2018	40'	CNG	3301-3323	23	
	Gillig Low Floor	2020	40'	CNG	3401-3420	20	
	Gillig Low Floor	2022	40'	CNG	3501-3518	18	
	Gillig Low Floor	2020	40'	CNG	4011	1	This is a 2019 model
	Gillig Low Floor	2021	40'		4012-4016	5	
	Gillig Low Floor	2022	40'		4017-4021	5	
