= Jon Proudstar =

American actor

- Born: January 3, 1967 (age 59); Tucson, Arizona, U.S.
- Occupations: Actor, writer, director
- Years active: 1989 – present

Jon Santaanta Proudstar (born January 3, 1967, in Tucson, Arizona) is an American film actor, film and comic book writer, and director.

He first appeared in Madhouse with John Larroquette and Kirstie Alley in 1990.

Proudstar wrote the one-shot comic book Tribal Force, illustrated by Ryan Huna Smith, and published in 1996.

Proudstar attended the 1998 Sundance Writers Lab as well as the Sundance Director's Lab in 2005.

Proudstar wrote, directed, and starred in his first independent film, Dude Vision, in 2005. Dude Vision won Best Comedy at the 2005 Arizona International Film Festival and Best Short Subject at the 2005 Native Voice Film Festival.

In 2009, Proudstar released his first feature film, So Close to Perfect.

In 2013, Proudstar contributed a story (illustrated by Terry LaBan) to the Graphic Classics volume Native American Classics.

== Personal life ==
Proudstar's heritage includes Yaqui, Maya, Jewish, and Mexican ancestry. He is a citizen of the Pascua Yaqui Tribe.

== Selected filmography ==
- The Lowdown (2026)
- Reservation Dogs (2021)
- Jackrabbit Sky (2007)
- Four Sheets to the Wind (2007)
- Into The West (2006)
- Dude Vision (2005)
- Border Warz (2004)
- Auf Wiedersehen, Pet (2002)
- Walker, Texas Ranger (1998)
- Bodies, Rest & Motion (1993)
- Madhouse (1990)
