= Ingenious (2009 American film) =

- Theatrical release poster
- Directed by: Jeff Balsmeyer
- Screenplay by: Mike Cram
- Produced by: Mike Cram; Brian Neufang
- Starring: Dallas Roberts; Jeremy Renner; Ayelet Zurer; Marguerite Moreau
- Cinematography: Geoffrey Hall
- Edited by: Suresh Ayyar; Marcus D'Arcy; Gavin Whalen
- Music by: Nicola Freegard (music coordinator Howe Gelb (composer: theme music); Gavin Whalen (music editor / music supervisor)
- Production company: Arriba
- Distributed by: Lionsgate
- Release date: February 1, 2009
- Running time: 85 minutes
- Country: United States
- Language: English

Ingenious (originally titled Lightbulb) is a 2009 American film. It is a rags-to-riches story of two friends, a small-time inventor and a sharky salesman, who hit rock bottom before coming up with a gizmo that becomes a worldwide phenomenon. It is based on the true story of some friends who are trying to come up with an invention, before hitting on an idea.

== Cast ==
- Dallas Roberts as Matt, an inventor
- Jeremy Renner as Sam, Matt's lifelong friend and business partner
- Ayelet Zurer as Gina, Matt's wife
- Marguerite Moreau as Cinda
- Amanda Anka as Louisa
- Richard Kind as Newkin
- Eddie Jemison as Bean
- Judith Scott as Rita
- Debby Rosenthal as Brenda
- Michael Kagan as Mort
- Rob Brownstein as Kent
- Vince Grant as Randall
- François Chau as Mr. Chow

== Production ==
The film was shot on location in Tucson, Arizona and Hong Kong. It premiered at the 2009 Santa Barbara International Film Festival.

== Reception ==
In 2012, when the film went on release after Renner's success in The Hurt Locker and other films, The Los Angeles Times reviewed it: "the storytelling is wildly uneven, with an off-balance structure that leaves the ending feeling abrupt and rushed. Whatever other Renner B-sides are floating around out there, let’s hope they feel a little more genius than Ingenious."

== See also ==
- List of films shot in Arizona
