= Seth Gandrud =

American actor

Seth Gandrud is an American actor from North Dakota and currently living in Los Angeles, California. He is known for several films including The Crypt, Dead Enders, Perspective, Promise, and for the role of Dr. Nasir in the film Isis Rising: Curse of the Lady Mummy. Currently he is the host of the television talk show Men with No Lives.

== Filmography ==
=== Feature films ===
| Year | Title | Role | Notes |
|---|---|---|---|
| 2007 | Yesterday's Tomorrow | Jay | |
| 2007 | Asylum | SWAT member | |
| 2008 | Promise | Mason | |
| 2009 | References | Shane | |
| 2009 | Red Corvette | Federal agent | |
| 2009 | The Crypt | Dagmar | |
| 2010 | Dead Enders | Robert | |
| 2010 | Western X | Voice | |
| 2011 | Predatory Instinct | Feral Man | |
| 2011 | Sustisimo Nivel | Sam | |
| 2012 | Ghost Magnet | Riley | |
| 2012 | A Moment in Time | James | |
| 2012 | Black Cloud | Neighbor | |
| 2012 | Suspicion | Thug #2 | |
| 2012 | A Man Called Nereus | Keith Taylor | |
| 2012 | The Five Day Crucifixion | John Santo | |
| 2013 | Isis Rising: Curse of the Lady Mummy | Dr. Nasir | |
| 2013 | A Day on Bleaker Street | Anthony Colletta | |
| 2013 | Split | Unknown | |
| 2013 | Perspective | Castiel Jude | |
| 2014 | Star Babies | Unknown | |
| 2013 | Star Babies | Unknown | |
| 2013 | Possible | Boyfriend | |
| 2014 | Thomas Hardy's the Three Strangers | Unknown | |
| 2014 | D.H. Lawrence's You Touched Me | Unknown | |
| 2014 | Kate Chopin's the Locket | Unknown | |
| 2014 | Fyodor Dostoevsky's a Little Hero | Unknown | |
| 2013/VI | Torn | Demon | |
| 2015 | Grief | Josh | |
| 2015 | Soldier Girl | Anthony Gang #1 | |
| 2015 | Hidden Highway: WLL2LIV | Dylan Clark | |
| 2015 | The Haunted | Reverend Michaels | |
| 2015 | Durant's Never Closes | Mike | |

=== Television ===
| Year | Title | Role | Notes |
|---|---|---|---|
| 2008 | The Unjust | Elias Sampson | |
| 2012 | H.O.P.E | Craig | |
