= Roger Hedden =

American playwright and screenwriter

Roger Franklin Hedden (born 20th century) is an American playwright, screenwriter and producer.

== Biography ==
After studying playwriting at Columbia University in New York City, he has staged plays at theaters, including Lincoln Center Theater in New York. His screenplays include Bodies, Rest & Motion (1993), Sleep with Me (1994), and Hi-Life (1998). He wrote the episode "Out of the Light" on Season 6 of Criminal Minds.

== See also ==
- List of American writers
- List of Columbia University people
- List of people from New York City
- List of playwrights from the United States
- List of screenwriters

== External link ==
- Roger Hedden at IMDb
