= Sahuarita Unified School District =

School district in Pima County, Arizona

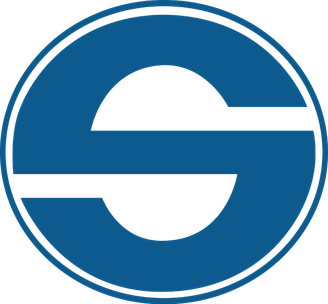

Location
- Sahuarita and Green Valley United States

District information
- Type: Public
- Motto: Together, we make a difference!
- Grades: Pre K-12
- Established: 1896
- Superintendent: Dr. Manuel Valenzuela
- Deputy superintendent(s): Scott Downs, Brett Bonner

Students and staff
- Students: 5,800

Other information
- Website: susd30.us

The Sahuarita Unified School District is the school district serving Sahuarita and Green Valley, Arizona. The district serves 5,800 students.

== Campuses ==
=== Elementary and middle schools ===
- Sahuarita Primary (K-2)
- Sahuarita Intermediate (3-5)
- Sahuarita Middle (6-8)
- Sopori School (K-6) (originally the sole school of the now annexed Sopori Elementary School District (Pima County School District No. 49)
- Anza Trail (K-8)
- Copper View Elementary (K-5)
- Wrightson Ridge (K-8)

=== High schools ===
- Sahuarita High School
- Walden Grove High School
