= Hi-Life (film) =

- Directed by: Roger Hedden
- Screenplay by: Roger Hedden
- Produced by: Erica Silverman
- Starring: Katrin Cartlidge; Charles Durning; Daryl Hannah; Moira Kelly; Peter Riegert; Campbell Scott; Eric Stoltz
- Cinematography: John Thomas
- Edited by: Tom McArdle
- Music by: David Lawrence
- Production company: Gun for Hire Films
- Distributed by: Lions Gate Films
- Release dates: October 1998 (Chicago); November 27, 1998 (United States)
- Running time: 82 minutes
- Country: United States
- Language: English

Hi-Life is a 1998 American Christmas romantic comedy film written and directed by Roger Hedden and starring Katrin Cartlidge, Charles Durning, Daryl Hannah, Moira Kelly, Peter Riegert, Campbell Scott and Eric Stoltz.

== Plot ==
At Christmas-time, a generally disliked out-of-work actor finds himself in debt for $900 to a local bookie, who threatens to start breaking bones if he doesn't pay. Knowing he won't get much sympathy, he tells his girlfriend that he needs money for an emergency abortion for his sister. Soon a bartender and a friendly bar customer starts hitting everyone up for the cash. Meanwhile everyone is roaming amongst Christmas parties and spreading the word. In the end, everyone meets back at the bar and only then does the actor's ploy stand revealed.

== Cast ==
- Katrin Cartlidge as April
- Charles Durning as "Fatty"
- Daryl Hannah as Maggie
- Moira Kelly as Susan
- Peter Riegert as Minor
- Campbell Scott as Ray
- Eric Stoltz as Jimmy
- Anne De Salvo as Sherry
- Saundra Santiago as Elena
- Bruce MacVittie as "Cluck"
- Tegan West as Phil
- Carlo Alban as Ricky

== Reception ==
The film has an 83% rating on Rotten Tomatoes.
