= Sahuarita High School =

Location
- 350 West Sahuarita Rd. Sahuarita, Arizona 85629; United States; 31°57′34″N 110°58′23″W

Information
- School type: Public high school
- Motto: "Go Mustangs!" and "We Bleed Blue & Gold!"
- Established: 1967 (59 years ago)
- School district: Sahuarita Unified School District
- CEEB code: 030357
- Principal: Stephanie Magnuson
- Teaching staff: 58.70 (FTE)
- Grades: 9-12
- Enrollment: 1,181 (2023–2024)
- Student to teacher ratio: 20.12
- Colors: Blue and gold
- Mascot: Mustangs
- Website: shs.susd30.us

Sahuarita High School ("SHS") is a high school located in Sahuarita, Arizona under the jurisdiction of the Sahuarita Unified School District. The school is located a few miles south of Tucson.

The 153,000-square-foot (14,200 m^{2}), $11 million ($21.7 million in 2025 dollars) campus, built in 1998 to house 1,100 students, consists of a student services/media center; three two-story classroom buildings; an art and music building, carpentry shop; and an auto shop/technology building.

== Alumni ==
- Anthony Birchak – professional mixed martial artist
