= Dennis Rowland =

American jazz vocalist (born 1948)

- Born: February 3, 1948 (age 78); Detroit, Michigan
- Genres: Vocal jazz
- Occupation: Singer
- Years active: 1970–present
- Label: Concord

Dennis Rowland is an American jazz vocalist born and raised in Detroit.

== Career ==
Having grown up in a household of jazz enthusiasts, Rowland developed an appreciation for jazz music at an early age. At the age of five or six Rowland heard the vocals of Joe Williams of the Count Basie Orchestra, which has influenced his approach to singing ever since.

In the early 1970s, Rowland worked as a singer and actor in Detroit. In 1977 Count Basie hired him to sing on tour, filling the same role his idols Joe Williams and Jimmy Rushing had occupied. For Rowland, it was a dream come true, and he toured with Basie for the next seven years. During his time with Basie, he had the chance to share the stage with Sarah Vaughan, Ella Fitzgerald and Tony Bennett. Rowland was seen as Jimmy Baker in the film Real Gone Cat directed by Robert Sucato.

== Discography ==
=== Studio albums ===
- Rhyme, Rhythm & Reason (Concord Jazz, 1995)
- Get Here (Concord Vista 1996)
- Now Dig This! A Vocal Celebration of Miles Davis (Concord Jazz, 1997)

=== Credits ===
Count Basie Album	Year	Label
Count Basie: The Golden Years	—	Pablo
On the Road	1979	Pablo/Original Jazz Classics
Kansas City Shout	1980	Pablo
Wendell Harrison Album	Year	Label
Birth of a Fossil	1985	Rebirth
Ray Anthony Album	Year	Label
Swing Back to the 40s	1991	Aerospace
Joe Sample Album	Year	Label
Sample This	1997	Warner Bros.
Frank Foster Album	Year	Label
We Do It Diff'rent	2003	Mapleshade
