= East Sahuarita, Arizona =

Community in Pima County, Arizona

- former CDP
- Location in Pima County and the state of Arizona
- Coordinates: 31°56′43″N 110°55′6″W
- Country: United States
- State: Arizona
- County: Pima

Area
  - Total: 14.6 sq mi (37.9 km^{2})
  - Land: 14.6 sq mi (37.9 km^{2})
  - Water: 0 sq mi (0.0 km^{2})
- Elevation: 2,782 ft (848 m)

Population (2000)
  - Total: 1,419
  - Density: 97/sq mi (37.4/km^{2})
- Time zone: UTC-7 (MST (no DST))
- FIPS code: 04-21537
- GNIS feature ID: 1853157

East Sahuarita was a census-designated place (CDP) in Pima County, Arizona, United States. The population was 1,419 at the 2000 census. The CDP comprises the unincorporated neighborhoods east of incorporated Sahuarita.

== Geography ==
East Sahuarita is located at 31°56′43″N 110°55′6″W (31.945388, -110.918388).

According to the United States Census Bureau, the CDP has a total area of 14.6 square miles (37.9 km^{2}), all land.

== Demographics ==
At the 2000 census, there were 1,419 people, 472 households, and 376 families living in the CDP. The population density was 96.9 inhabitants per square mile (37.4/km^{2}). There were 512 housing units at an average density of 35.0 per square mile (13.5/km^{2}). The racial makeup of the CDP was 77.6% White, 0.6% Black or African American, 2.2% Native American, 0.6% Asian, 16.4% from other races, and 2.8% from two or more races. 48.1% of the population were Hispanic or Latino of any race. Of the 472 households 42.8% had children under the age of 18 living with them, 60.8% were married couples living together, 12.5% had a female householder with no husband present, and 20.3% were non-families. 15.0% of households were one person and 4.7% were one person aged 65 or older. The average household size was 3.0 and the average family size was 3.4.

The age distribution was 32.1% under the age of 18, 9.2% from 18 to 24, 29.2% from 25 to 44, 22.2% from 45 to 64, and 7.2% 65 or older. The median age was 32 years. For every 100 females, there were 97.9 males. For every 100 females age 18 and over, there were 98.1 males.

The median household income was $33,083 and the median family income was $37,292. Males had a median income of $29,107 versus $21,406 for females. The per capita income for the CDP was $12,484. About 15.7% of families and 24.0% of the population were below the poverty line, including 30.6% of those under age 18 and 14.3% of those age 65 or over.
