= Green Valley, Arizona =

CDP in Pima County, Arizona

- CDP
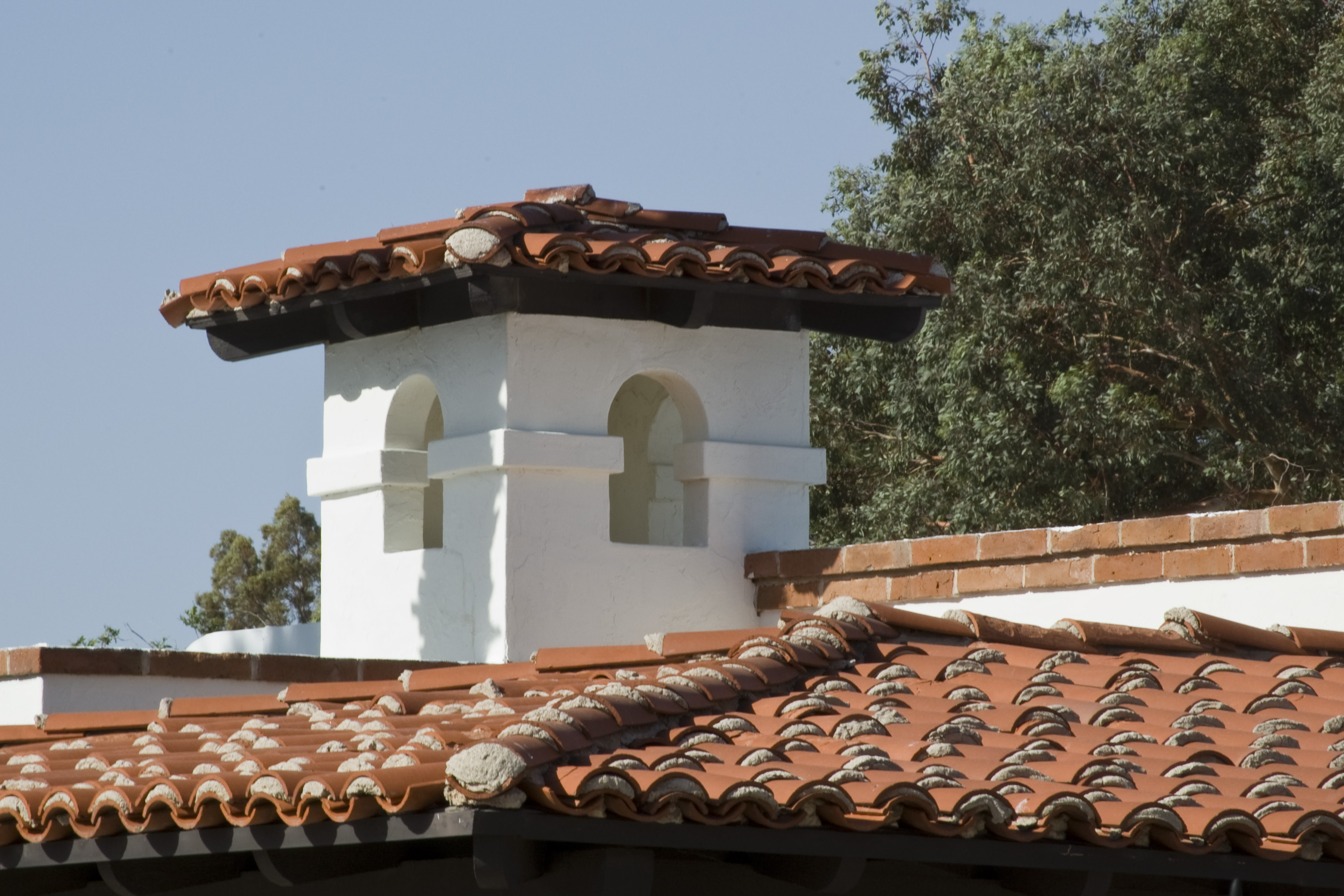
- Tile rooftop in Green Valley

- Location in Pima County and Arizona

- Location in the United States
- Coordinates: 31°51′N 111°0′W
- Country: United States
- State: Arizona
- County: Pima

Area
  - Total: 19.75 sq mi (51.14 km^{2})
  - Land: 19.73 sq mi (51.10 km^{2})
  - Water: 0.015 sq mi (0.04 km^{2})
- Elevation: 2,979 ft (908 m)

Population (2020)
  - Total: 22,616
  - Density: 1,146.3/sq mi (442.59/km^{2})
- Time zone: UTC−7 (Mountain (MST))
- ZIP codes: 85614, 85622
- Area code: 520
- FIPS code: 04-29710
- GNIS feature ID: 37327

Green Valley is an unincorporated community and census-designated place (CDP) in Pima County, Arizona, United States. The population was 22,616 at the 2020 census.

== Geography ==
Green Valley is located along the western side of the Santa Cruz River at 31°51′N 111°0′W (31.8556, -111.0001). Continental is to the east of Green Valley, on the other side of the river.

According to the United States Census Bureau, the CDP has a total area of 26.3 square miles (68 km^{2}), of which 26.2 square miles (68 km^{2}) is land and 0.04 square miles (0.10 km^{2}) (0.08%) is water.

Green Valley is twenty miles (32 km) south of Tucson and 40 miles (64 km) north of Nogales, Sonora, Mexico. Surrounded by copper mines, and near the cycling, hiking and birding areas of the Santa Rita Mountains, Green Valley is an unincorporated retirement community composed of 59 Homeowner Associations.

The largest of the mines are the Sierrita Mine owned by Freeport-McMoRan and the Mission Mine of ASARCO. Compared to other mines in Arizona the two mines are large; Sierrita is low-grade.

=== Climate ===
Green Valley has a borderline hot semi-arid/hot desert climate (Köppen BSh/BWh) with three seasons: a warm to mild winter with chilly nights from October through March; a hot, extremely dry summer season from April to late June; and a hot, relatively humid monsoon season from July through September. Outside monsoon season, rainfall is uniformly scarce, having exceeded 4.0 inches or 100 millimetres only in October 2000 amongst other months. The wettest month on record has been July 1990 with 10.43 inches or 264.9 millimetres, of which 3.22 inches or 81.8 millimetres fell on July 15. The wettest calendar year has been 1993 with 22.00 inches or 558.8 millimetres while the driest since 1988 has been 1997 with 9.90 inches or 251.5 millimetres.

Temperatures are uniformly hot during the summer and monsoon seasons, with 90 °F or 32.2 °C exceeded on 154 days during an average year, and 77 nights failing to fall below 70 °F or 21.1 °C, including every night during August 2011. Frosts occur 37 nights per winter on average, and daytime highs fail to top 50 °F or 10 °C on nine days.

Climate data for Green Valley, Arizona (1991–2020 normals, extremes 1998–present)
Month	Jan	Feb	Mar	Apr	May	Jun	Jul	Aug	Sep	Oct	Nov	Dec	Year
Record high °F (°C)	88 (31)	90 (32)	101 (38)	100 (38)	108 (42)	112 (44)	111 (44)	110 (43)	109 (43)	103 (39)	93 (34)	86 (30)	112 (44)
Mean daily maximum °F (°C)	66.9 (19.4)	69.2 (20.7)	75.6 (24.2)	82.1 (27.8)	90.6 (32.6)	99.8 (37.7)	98.9 (37.2)	97.2 (36.2)	94.4 (34.7)	86.5 (30.3)	75.7 (24.3)	66.3 (19.1)	83.6 (28.7)
Daily mean °F (°C)	51.5 (10.8)	54.2 (12.3)	60.0 (15.6)	66.1 (18.9)	74.5 (23.6)	83.8 (28.8)	85.4 (29.7)	84.2 (29.0)	80.4 (26.9)	70.4 (21.3)	59.5 (15.3)	51.2 (10.7)	68.4 (20.2)
Mean daily minimum °F (°C)	36.1 (2.3)	39.1 (3.9)	44.4 (6.9)	50.0 (10.0)	58.4 (14.7)	67.8 (19.9)	72.0 (22.2)	71.2 (21.8)	66.4 (19.1)	54.3 (12.4)	43.3 (6.3)	36.1 (2.3)	53.3 (11.8)
Record low °F (°C)	17 (−8)	16 (−9)	29 (−2)	31 (−1)	44 (7)	52 (11)	60 (16)	60 (16)	50 (10)	31 (−1)	22 (−6)	21 (−6)	16 (−9)
Average precipitation inches (mm)	0.78 (20)	0.86 (22)	0.58 (15)	0.27 (6.9)	0.18 (4.6)	0.44 (11)	2.86 (73)	2.69 (68)	1.70 (43)	0.84 (21)	0.51 (13)	1.14 (29)	12.85 (326.5)
Source: Tucson National Weather Service

== Demographics ==
Historical population
Census	Pop.	Note	%±
1980	5,717		—
1990	13,231		131.4%
2000	17,283		30.6%
2010	21,391		23.8%
2020	22,616		5.7%
U.S. Decennial Census

=== 2020 census ===
As of the 2020 census, Green Valley had a population of 22,616. The median age was 73.1 years. 1.6% of residents were under the age of 18 and 79.9% of residents were 65 years of age or older. For every 100 females there were 79.9 males, and for every 100 females age 18 and over there were 79.7 males age 18 and over.

96.7% of residents lived in urban areas, while 3.3% lived in rural areas.

There were 13,607 households in Green Valley, of which 2.3% had children under the age of 18 living in them. Of all households, 49.9% were married-couple households, 14.7% were households with a male householder and no spouse or partner present, and 31.4% were households with a female householder and no spouse or partner present. About 40.5% of all households were made up of individuals and 33.6% had someone living alone who was 65 years of age or older.

There were 16,974 housing units, of which 19.8% were vacant. The homeowner vacancy rate was 2.3% and the rental vacancy rate was 19.3%.

Racial composition as of the 2020 census
Race	Number	Percent
White	20,731	91.7%
Black or African American	88	0.4%
American Indian and Alaska Native	84	0.4%
Asian	186	0.8%
Native Hawaiian and Other Pacific Islander	7	0.0%
Some other race	427	1.9%
Two or more races	1,093	4.8%
Hispanic or Latino (of any race)	1,471	6.5%

=== 2010 census ===
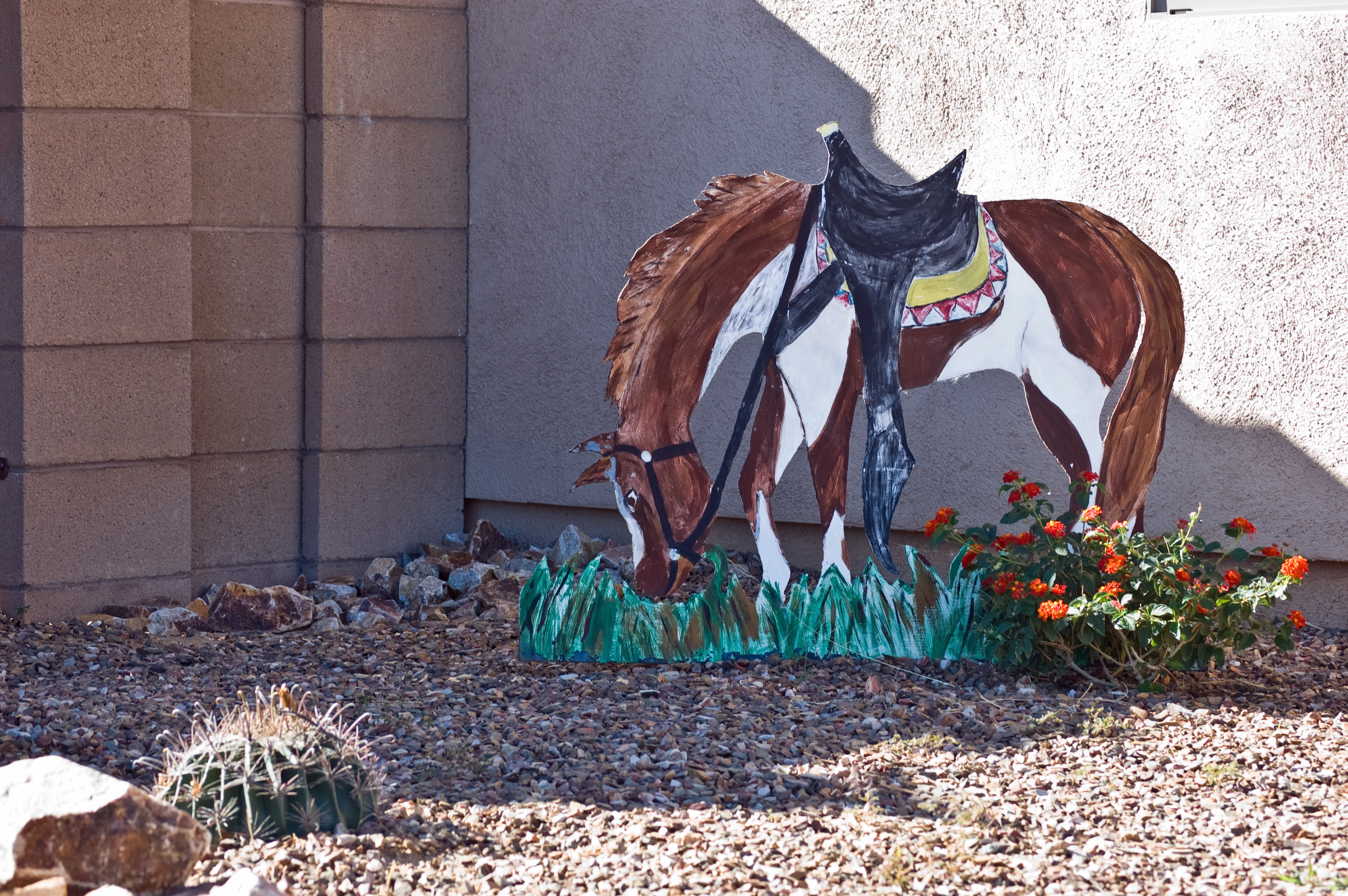
Yard art in Green Valley neighborhood

As of the census of 2010, there were 21,391 people residing in Green Valley. The population density was 663.4 people per square mile. There were 17,322 housing units. The racial makeup of the CDP was 93.4% non-Hispanic White, 0.4% Black or African American, 0.3% Native American, 0.7% Asian, 0.4% from other races, and 0.7% from two or more races. 4.9% of the population were Hispanic or Latino of any race.

The median income for a household in Green Valley was $46,732 in 2014 dollars. The per capita income for the CDP was $35,416. 4.6% of the population was below the poverty line.

=== 2000 census ===
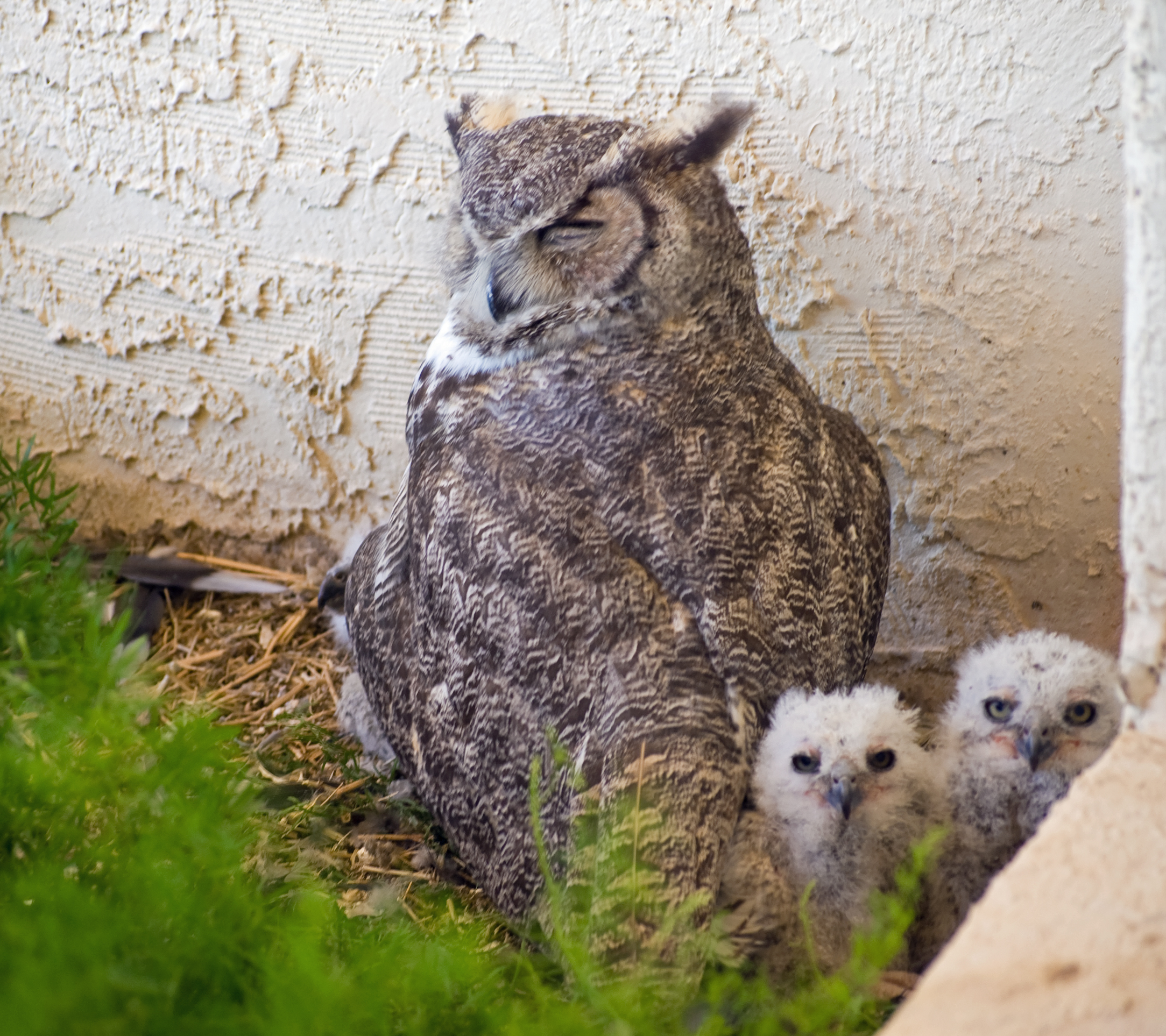
Great Horned Owl mother & three chicks, April 2008, Green Valley

As of the census of 2000, there were 17,283 people, 9,995 households, and 6,296 families residing in the CDP. The population density was 658.6 inhabitants per square mile (254.3/km^{2}). There were 13,263 housing units at an average density of 505.4 per square mile (195.1/km^{2}). The racial makeup of the CDP was 98.4% White, 0.2% Black or African American, 0.2% Native American, 0.3% Asian, 0.1% Pacific Islander, 0.4% from other races, and 0.5% from two or more races. 2.3% of the population were Hispanic or Latino of any race.

There were 9,995 households, out of which 1.5% had children under the age of 18 living with them, 59.8% were married couples living together, 2.5% had a female householder with no husband present, and 37.0% were non-families. 34.1% of all households were made up of individuals, and 28.5% had someone living alone who was 65 years of age or older. The average household size was 1.71 and the average family size was 2.07.

In the CDP, the population consisted of 1.6% of inhabitants under the age of 18, 0.7% from 18 to 24, 2.8% from 25 to 44, 21.7% from 45 to 64, and 73.3% who were 65 years of age or older. The median age was 72 years. For every 100 females, there were 79.7 males. For every 100 females age 18 and over, there were 79.3 males.

The median income for a household in the CDP was $40,213, and the median income for a family was $48,369. Males had a median income of $34,500 versus $25,932 for females. The per capita income for the CDP was $31,138. About 1.7% of families and 3.0% of the population were below the poverty line, including 3.1% of those under age 18 and 2.8% of those age 65 or over.

== Government ==
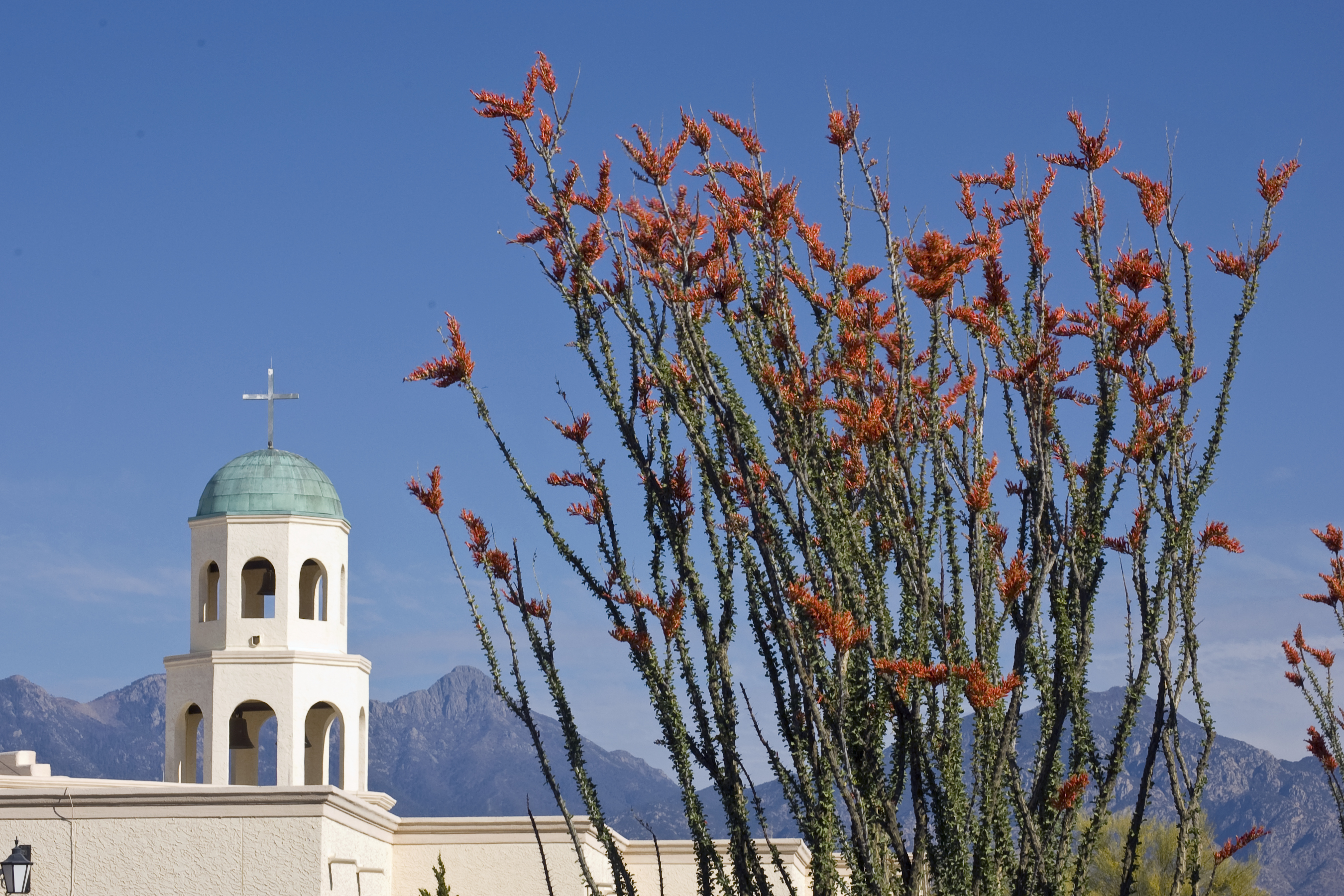
Ocotillos at Valley Presbyterian Church, Green Valley, Arizona

As an unincorporated community, most government services are provided by Pima County. The Green Valley Council, a community association, represents Green Valley to the county government. A second community association, Green Valley Recreation, provides recreation services to Green Valley.

Santa Rita Fire District provides fire and emergency services to Green Valley and Neighboring town of Sahuarita.

== Economy ==
Freeport McMoRan's Sierrita mine is located in Green Valley and is one of the town's largest employers and is involved in investing in the community.

== Transportation ==
Green Valley is served by Sun Shuttle service to Tucson.

== Water sustainability ==
According to a 2007 report by Pima County, 76,000 acre-feet (94,000,000 m^{3}) of water was pumped from the aquifer in the Upper Santa Cruz Valley in 2006, with 85 percent of that water being used for mining and agriculture. The remaining 15 percent was split between water used for golf courses and residential/commercial water use. The report explains that "The Green Valley area does not have a sustainable water supply given current groundwater pumping rates... the water table in Green Valley has been declining in past years, and is expected to decline even faster as water demands [continue to increase]...". The report concludes that "Water supplies will become critical within the next ten years."

The original 2007 report from Pima County contained a number of recommendations. Four out of five of the recommendations suggested taking advantage the "Central Arizona Project (CAP) renewable water supplies, as well as recharge of the same". The report states, "the size of a pipeline that would convey Central Arizona Project water for direct use or recharge for the entire Upper Basin would need to be at least 72 inches in diameter." As of 2017 one 36" CAP pipeline has been completed with a second 36" CAP pipeline slated for completion in the later part of 2017. (Note, however, that two 36-inch pipes provide only one half the capacity of a single 72-inch pipe, because capacity scales with cross-sectional area, not with diameter.)

The Upper Santa Cruz Valley has several major water users, all pumping water out of the same aquifer. Most area water users are for-profit companies. ASARCO-Mission Mine, Freeport-McMoRan Sierrita Mine and Farmers Investment Co. (farming) are industrial scale water users. Residential water is provided by Farmers Water Company, Sahuarita Water Company, Las Quintas Serenas Water Company, Quail Creek Water Company, Community Water Company of Green Valley (a nonprofit member owned cooperative), and the Green Valley Water District (a governmental water utility). The proliferation of water companies can be partially explained by the fact that Arizona water law places few limits on the amount of water that can be pumped with costs limited only to drilling, pumping, distribution, etc. Since 2007 the Upper Santa Cruz Providers and Users Group (USCPUG) has been working to bring all local water entities, including the Town of Sahuarita, to the same table. Most of the water users and utilities are now members of USCPUG. The organization has published an analysis and projection of area water use through 2030. It has joined with the U S Bureau of Reclamation to lay the groundwork for transportation and use of Colorado River water from the Central Arizona Project canal to greatly reduce reliance on pumping groundwater. If a system is successfully completed, the excess pumping will be largely or fully eliminated. The process through design and construction is expected to take several years with funding being the major challenge.

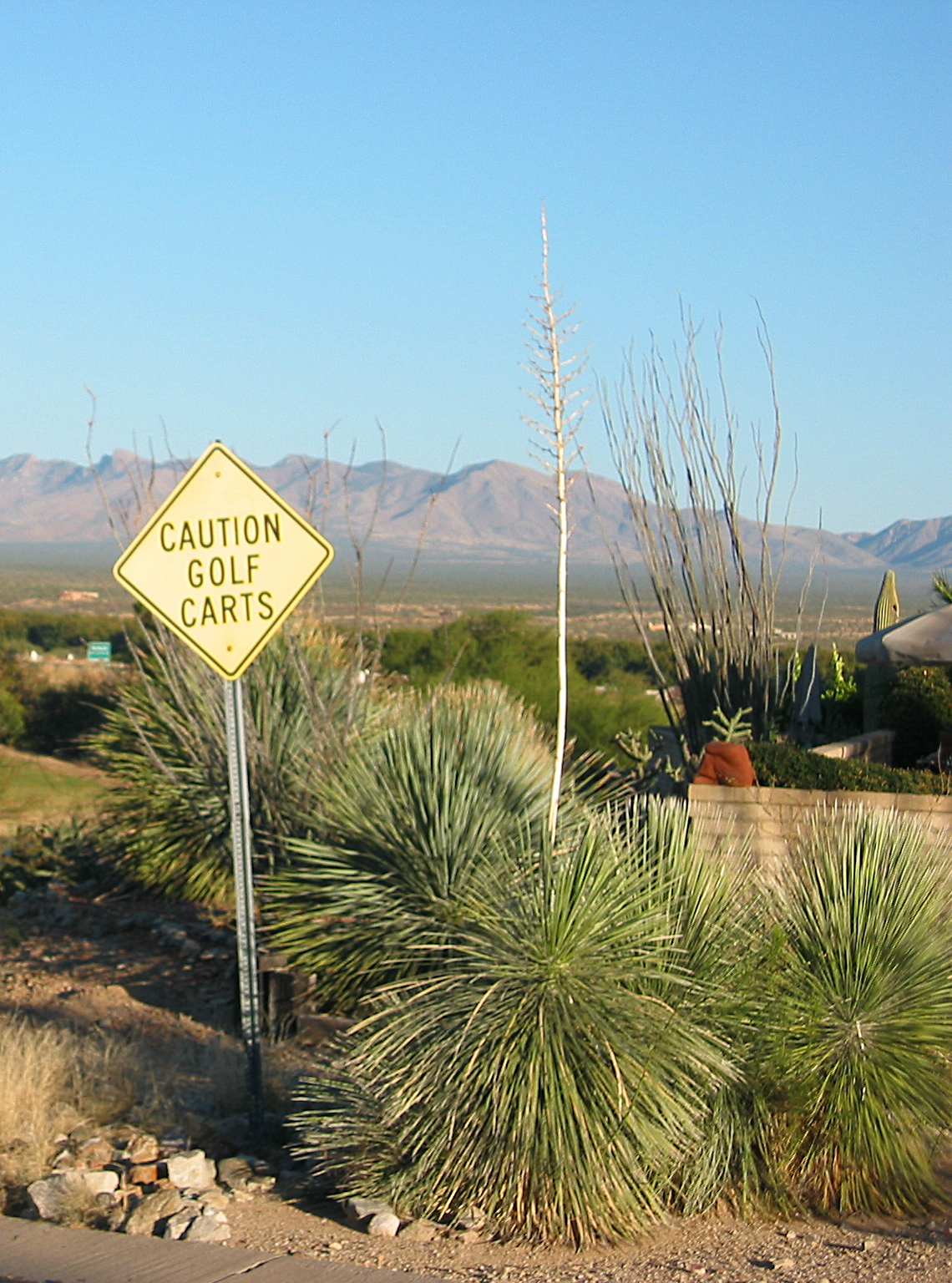
Golf carts are popular in Green Valley

== Attractions ==
In 2005 Green Valley was the host of the SAE Mini Baja 100 competition. Mini Baja vehicles are custom made by students. In this case there were about 60 teams from various universities, including some from Canada. ETS – École de technologie supérieure of the Université du Québec, from Montreal, Quebec, Canada, won the competition.

Green Valley is home to the Titan Missile Museum, America's largest nuclear weapons museum.

Green Valley is also home to the White Elephant Thrift Store, a establishment widely known as a passing through location of the belongings of the dead and soon-to-be.

== Education ==
The Consolidated District Plan (CDP) is in the Continental Elementary School District.(K-8). Students typically attend high schools in the neighboring Sahuarita Unified School District, which serves surrounding areas and provides secondary education for Green Valley residents.
