= Real Gone Cat =

- Promotional movie poster for the film
- Directed by: Robert Sucato
- Written by: Scott Hopkins
- Produced by: Monsoon Films; Hopcat Productions
- Starring: Dennis Rowland; Scott Hopkins; Tracy Sucato; Mark Gluckman; Gary Imel; Jesse McGuire
- Release date: April 2006 (U.S.)
- Running time: 19 minutes
- Country: United States
- Language: English

Real Gone Cat is a 2006 film directed by Robert Sucato and starring Dennis Rowland and Scott Hopkins. The film was an official selection of both the Sedona Film Festival and the Phoenix Film Festival. Hopkins wrote and starred in the film with Rowland.

== Cast ==
- Dennis Rowland as Jimmy Baker
- Scott Hopkins as Picasso
- Tracy Sucato as Darlene
- Jesse McGuire as Ziggy Charles
- Mark Gluckman as Nick
- Gary Imel as Peter
- James Forsmo as Man at bar

== Crew ==
- Director - Robert Sucato
- Writer - Scott Hopkins
- Producer - Robert Sucato and Scott Hopkins
- Director of photography - Steve Wargo
- Sound editor - Danny Coltrane

== Film Festivals ==
- 2006 Sedona Film Festival
- 2006 Phoenix Film Festival
- 2006 San Tan Short Film Festival
- 2007 Kansas City Filmmakers Jubilee (Kansas City FilmFest)
