= Bodies, Rest & Motion =

1993 film by Michael Steinberg

- Poster artwork
- Directed by: Michael Steinberg
- Screenplay by: Roger Hedden
- Based on: Bodies, Rest & Motion by Roger Hedden
- Produced by: Joel Kastelberg
- Starring: Phoebe Cates; Bridget Fonda; Tim Roth; Eric Stoltz
- Cinematography: Bernd Heinl
- Edited by: Jay Cassidy
- Music by: Michael Convertino
- Distributed by: Fine Line Features
- Release dates: January 1993 (Sundance): April 9, 1993 (United States)
- Running time: 95 minutes
- Country: United States
- Language: English
- Box office: $764,724

Bodies, Rest & Motion is a 1993 American drama film written by Roger Hedden based on his 1986 play, and directed by Michael Steinberg. The film stars Phoebe Cates, Bridget Fonda, Tim Roth, and Eric Stoltz as four people whose interests in life and each other start to change. The film partly takes place at small gas stations in the Arizona desert. Bridget Fonda's real-life father, Peter Fonda, has a cameo as a motorcycle rider. Bodies, Rest & Motion premiered at the 1993 Sundance Film Festival and was screened in the Un Certain Regard section at the 1993 Cannes Film Festival.

== Cast ==
- Phoebe Cates as Carol
- Bridget Fonda as Beth
- Tim Roth as Nick
- Eric Stoltz as Sid
- Alicia Witt as Elizabeth
- Sandra Lafferty as Yard Sale Lady
- Sidney Dawson as TV Customer
- Jon Proudstar as Station Attendant
- Scott Johnson as Chip
- Kezbah Weidner as Dine Woman
- Peter Fonda as Motorcycle Rider
- Amaryllis Borrego as Waitress
- Rich Wheeler as Elizabeth's Grandfather
- Scott Frederick as TV Store Kid
- Warren Burton as Radio Preacher (voice)

== Original stage version ==
Hedden wrote the script based on his own play, which premiered off-Broadway on December 21, 1986, at the Mitzi E. Newhouse Theater, with William H. Macy as Nick, Christina Moore as Carol, Laurie Metcalf as Beth, and Andrew McCarthy as Sid. According to Frank Rich, the play's "meager plot—an arbitrary coupling or two, followed by equally whimsical leave-takings and reunions—leads to nothing more than a sentimental final-curtain reaffirmation of the transforming powers of true love." The original run lasted 22 performances.

== Reception ==
Janet Maslin called the characters played by the four central actors "quirky, magnetic", saying they are set against the backdrop of a "bland, artificial culture winning its war with nature"; the film is "much too studiedly hip to indulge in a happy ending, but in its wry, offbeat way it does inch forward. In this jaded context, a small step in the right direction is indeed a large step for mankind." According to People, the film "wants desperately to say something profound about the condition of twentysomethings. But it succeeds only in sounding like outtakes from an undergrad bull session. While Fonda and Cates manage to keep their footing, Roth elicits no emotion beyond irritation, and Stoltz acts as if he's had his nose in the latex too long." Roger Ebert gave the film two stars out of four, saying it is "one of those movies that not only comes accompanied by supporting materials, but seems fairly pointless unless you brief yourself"; according to Ebert, if the viewer knows Newton's first law of motion and keeps in mind that "'Generation X' is a media buzzword for the late-twentysomethings [who have been] so named, apparently, for their lack of an identity", it is "possible to watch Bodies, Rest and Motion, and find that it makes a statement about its generation. Without the cheat sheet, you'd more likely say the movie is about a bunch of aimless, boring, hopeless drips, who inspire neither sympathy nor interest. If I were a doctor, I'd suspect Lyme disease."

On Rotten Tomatoes, Bodies, Rest & Motion has an approval rating of 61% based on 36 reviews.

== Home video ==
The film received a LaserDisc release from the Criterion Collection in December 1993. In December 2020, the film received a Blu-ray release from Kino Lorber.
