= The Crypt (film) =

2009 horror film by Craig McMahon

The Crypt is an independent 2009 horror film written and directed by Craig McMahon. The film depicts a group of thieves who break into a catacomb to steal jewels and then encounter undead beings intent on killing them.

== Plot ==
The movie begins with a sole grave robber in 1979, who steals his way into the crypt in order to find jewelry. He is killed by the undead after he finds some jewelry and is trying to get more. Decades later, a man is shown getting out of prison. His girlfriend picks him up at the prison gate with a car and takes him to a meeting place with some of her friends. There, one experienced thief, a lady, says that she knows how to make much money quickly by getting jewelry from a crypt under the city and that she has connections able to sell the jewelry for them. She shows the others a gold ring from down below. She says that rich families during the Great Depression in the U.S. were afraid that the government would take the jewelry away from them, so they buried their riches in the crypts with the remains of their family members. At first the others are very unhappy about the idea of the scheme and are about to leave, but the ringleader manages to persuade them to go with her.

The group makes it into the crypt and the members fill their backpacks with diamond necklaces and other expensive jewelry from the concrete coffins, but one by one several of the members of the group are killed by the undead, who apparently are taking revenge for the people taking the jewelry. In the end, only the ringleader and the girlfriend of the one guy who was released from prison make it out of the crypt alive. Before they leave the crypt, they get rid of the jewelry, one of them saying that they would not get out of there alive with it.

Once back at her apartment, the ringleader finds a very expensive diamond studded piece of jewelry in her belongings that she remembers having put in her brassiere while first treasure hunting in the crypt. She shows her friend, but her friend is really angry about it and wants her to get rid of it apparently because she fears that the undead would come out of the crypt to kill them. The ringleader puts the piece of jewelry in her car and is later killed by the same undead individual who killed most of the other people. The remaining lady has a dream that her boyfriend, the one newly released from prison, is an undead and is angry at her for having left him down in the crypt. She goes back down into the crypt and sees that he is still alive. She dumps the jewelry that he has into the water, but he indicates that he is not sure that it is all of the jewelry that he has. Right after that, the undead kills the boyfriend by crushing his head. His girlfriend is shown in shock leaning up against the wall of the crypt. The movie ends.

== Cast ==
- Sarah Oh as PJ
- Seth Gandrud as Dagmar
- Abra May as Gina
- Mike Ranallo as Michael Ranallo
- Cristen Irene as Dorian
- Abra May as Gina
- Delaina Stevens as Morgan
- Joanna Ke as Adrianna
- R. Keith Wilson as Grave Robber
- Hollywood Yates as Hollywood Don Yates
- Nathan Hill as Correctional Officer
- Michael David Hill as Bobby
- E. Adam Thomas as Welch
- Savanah McMahon as Constance
