= Border Warz =

- Directed by: Rob Walker
- Written by: Joe Reyes; Rob Walker
- Produced by: Anthony Auriemma; Majica Enríquez
- Starring: Adrianne Bottrell; Princess Noemi Zavala; Anthony Auriemma; Jon Proudstar
- Cinematography: Darin Meyer
- Edited by: Carolyn Marbry
- Music by: Jay Everett
- Release date: December 6, 2004
- Language: English

Border Warz is a 2004 thriller film directed by Rob Walker and released by Trinity Home Entertainment.

The film is about a pair of women who try to investigate a drug cartel.

== Cast ==
- Adrianne Bottrell as Fabiola
- Princess Noemi Zavala as Fee
- Anthony Auriemma as Andreas (credited as Anthony Auriema)
- Jon Proudstar as Cassel
- Joe Jones as Echevaria
- Jenny Lind Mance as Julia
- Sylvianna Wood as Rafaella
- Frank Cavanaugh as Murphy
- Carolyn Marbry as Professor Cottingham / Camille
- Arnulfo Bermudez as Arnie
- James Ferguson as McMurdo
- Rachel Rieley as Esmeralda
- Luis Carlos Romero-Davis as Carlos
- Richard Ortiz as Homero
- Jacob Martinez as Mauricio
- Jesse Andre as Manny
- Ben Lopez as Esquema
- Sean Marbry as Tomas, Cemetery Thug / Tino, Roof Thug / Pablito / Little One
- Jack Tunks as Cowboy
- Tommy Tunks as Cowboy
- Larry Dempster as Quad Bike Killer
- Michael M. Hojjatie as Roberto
- Jon Marbry as Ramon, Hill Thug
- Mike Mafera as Dossantos
- Cristina Dunk as Ginger
- Darin Meyer as Big One
