= Sahuarita, Arizona =

Town in Pima County, Arizona

- Town
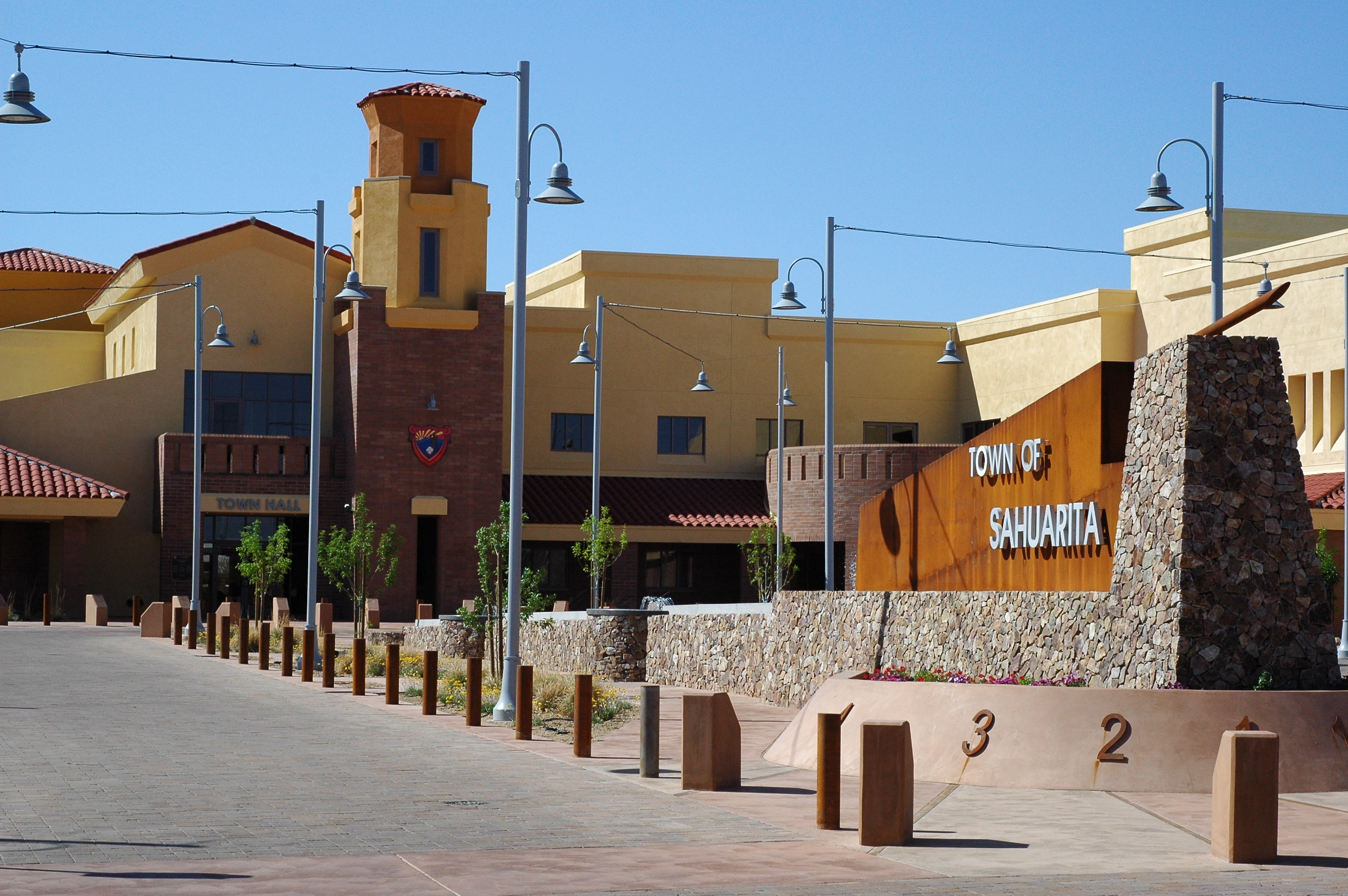
- Sahuarita Town Hall

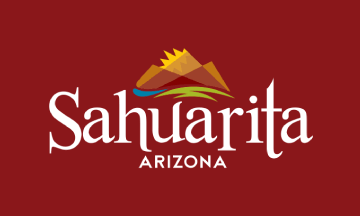
- Flag

- Location of Sahuarita in Pima County, Arizona.

- Location in Arizona Location in the United States
- Coordinates: 31°55′45″N 110°58′56″W
- Country: United States
- State: Arizona
- County: Pima
- Founded: 1911
- Incorporated: 1994

Government
  - Type: Council-manager
  - Body: Sahuarita Town Council
  - Mayor: Tom Murphy
  - Vice Mayor: Kara Egbert
  - Town Manager: Shane Dille
  - Town Council: List: • Kim Lisk; • Edgar Lytle; • Kara Egbert; • Steven Gillespie; • Diane Priolo; • Deborah Morales; • Tom Murphy

Area
  - Total: 31.68 sq mi (82.06 km^{2})
  - Land: 31.68 sq mi (82.06 km^{2})
  - Water: 0 sq mi (0.00 km^{2})
- Elevation: 2,703 ft (824 m)

Population (2020)
  - Total: 34,134
  - Density: 1,077.4/sq mi (415.97/km^{2})
- Time zone: UTC-7 (MST (no DST))
- ZIP code: 85629
- Area code: 520
- FIPS code: 04-62140
- GNIS feature ID: 33948
- Website: http://www.sahuaritaaz.gov/

Sahuarita /sɑːwəˈriːtə/ is a town in Pima County, Arizona, United States. Sahuarita is located south of the Tohono O'odham Nation and the north end of Green Valley, 15 miles (24 km) south of Tucson. The 2022 population estimate was 35,638.

== History ==
Sahuarita was founded in 1911 and incorporated in 1994.

=== Hohokam (200–1450) ===
The first known human inhabitants of the Sahuarita region were the Hohokam people, which may be the ancestors of the modern day Tohono O'odham nation. The Hohokam were known for their highly innovative and extensive use of irrigation. The Hohokam were very peaceful people, they had extensive trade routes extending to Mesoamerica, and showed many cultural influences from their southern neighbors.

=== Sobaipuri (1400–1900) ===
The Sobaipuri were possibly related to the Hohokam, and occupied the Southern portion of the Santa Cruz, with the Pima to their North and South. While Coronado passed just east of Sahuarita in 1521, it was not until Eusebio Kino's 1691 journey along the Santa Cruz River that he met the leaders of the Sobaipuri people. Kino was a true champion of the indigenous Indians, opposing forced labor in mines by Spanish overseers. Kino would later go on to found the Mission San Xavier del Bac in 1699, just north of Sahuarita. In 1775, Francisco Garcés would follow the same path, laying the groundwork for the founding of Tucson.

=== Spanish and Mexican control (1775–1853) ===
In 1775, after building a series of missions in the region, the Spanish established a fort in the Tucson region to control the Native American settlements nearby. This just north of Sahuarita, which effectively placed the region under Spanish control. Eventually a town came to be and was named Tucson. After the Mexican War of Independence in 1821, the region came under Mexican control until they sold the land to the United States as part of the Gadsden Purchase.

=== Incorporation into the U.S. (1854–1874) ===
In 1854, following the Gadsden Purchase, Sahuarita would become a part of the Territory of New Mexico, in the United States of America. In the same year, Andrew B. Gray would travel the region on behalf of the Texas Western Railroad, in order to run a preliminary survey of the region. Meanwhile, the Native American peoples of the region were being pushed onto each other's land through American expansionism. In 1857, the Sobaipuri, who had acted as a buffer between the hostile Mexicans to the south and Apache to the north, finally collapsed under the pressure and vacated the area, generally moving westward to Papago territory. Sahuarita was part of the Confederate Arizona Territory between 1861 and 1862 before being captured by the Union and incorporated into Arizona Territory in 1863. In 1867, Fort Crittenden was created between Sonoita and Patagonia in order to support the establishment of American settlements in the Santa Cruz Valley. In 1874, the San Xavier reservation was created, now called the Tohono O'odham Reservation, and Native Americans were forcibly relocated to the reservation.

=== Sahuarita on the map (1870–1925) ===
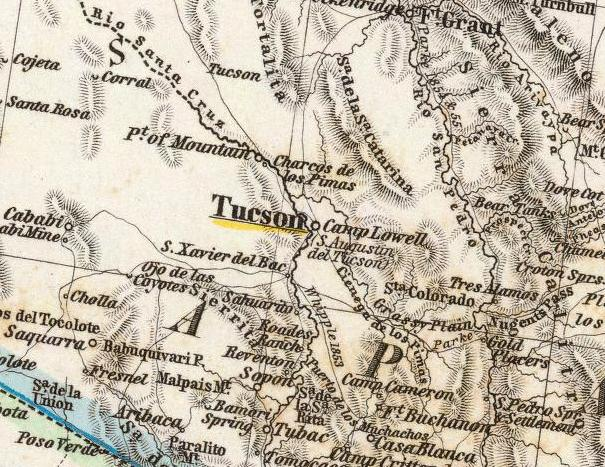
The first known map to list the town.1875

An 1870 map of Arizona shows an "Indian Village" just north of Sahuarita. The earliest known reference to the town can be found on a German map from 1875, which labels the town "Sahuarito". The first known US map to list the town came in 1879, by the US Department of Interior, calling the town "Saurita". The Saurita town name would continue to be found on successive maps of 1880 and 1890. Finally, a 1925 map of "Auto Trails" (e.g. roadways) of Arizona and New Mexico lists "Continental" instead of Sahuarita. The roadway at the time was an "improved road", one step inferior to a "paved road", laying the route to what today is called the Old Nogales Highway.

=== Sahuarita Ranch (1879–1886) ===
In 1879 Sahuarita Ranch was created by James Kilroy Brown. Brown chose the name Sahuarita due to the preponderance of saguaros in the area. The ranch was used as a staging area between Tucson, Arivaca, and Quijotoa. A small community developed in the area named Sahuarito, while the railroad laid tracks through the area (which remain to this day) and established a station and post office. Although originally surveyed by the Texas Western Railroad, the route would soon be run by the Southern Pacific Railroad up until the late 20th century. Brown sold his ranch in 1886 which caused the region to stagnate for three decades.

During this time, the hub of Sahuarita commerce was at the intersection of Sahuarita Road and Nogales Highway, in the form of the One Stop Market and Sahuarita Bar and Grill. These 130-year-old buildings which remained intact were demolished for a road expansion in 2013.

=== Continental Farm (1915–present) ===
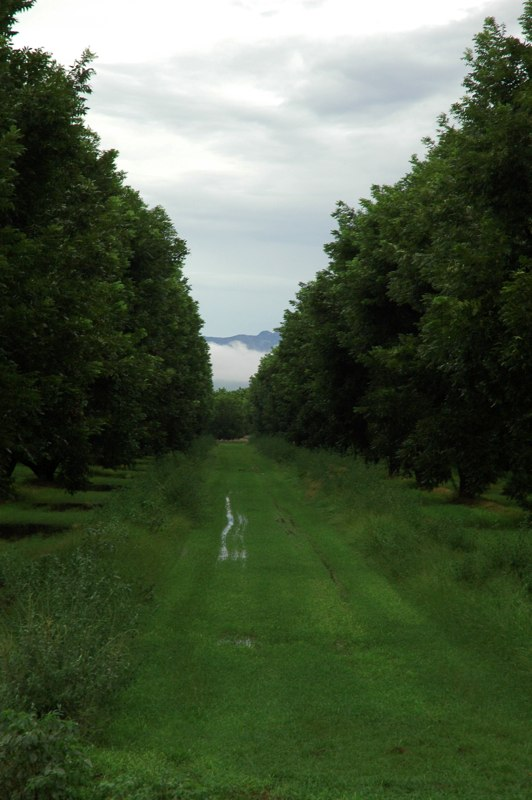
A view of the Pecan groves, with a glimpse of Santa Rita Mountains in the background, during the August monsoons (2007).

The Continental Farm of Sahuarita plays a central role in town history. In 1915, worried about the possibility of a German blockade of rubber imports, Bernard Baruch, Joseph Kennedy and J.P. Morgan founded the farm along the Santa Cruz River with hopes of growing guayule: plants that provide rubber. The project was abandoned after the end of World War I, and in 1922, was sold to Queen Wilhelmina of the Netherlands. The Queen rented the land to cotton farmers, in what would be the primary crop for the following four decades. In 1948, R. Keith Walden relocated the Farmers Investment Co. (FICO) from California to Arizona, buying the Continental Farm lands from the Queen. In 1965, over fears of a fall in demand for cotton resulting from the advent of synthetic fibers, Walden switched his crop to pecans. Today, the FICO pecan orchard is the largest in the world, with over 6,000 acres (24 km^{2}) and 106,000 trees.

=== World War II (1941–1945) ===
During World War II, Sahuarita was home to the Sahuarita Airstrip which was used to train bomber pilots for service in the war. Camp Continental, a labor camp for German prisoners of war was also located in Sahuarita. The location of the camp was around what is now Continental Ranch, West of the Nogales Highway and the Quail Crossing Boulevard intersection. It was established around November 1944, as one of 21 "branch" POW camps established throughout the state. The population of 250 prisoners primarily worked in agriculture, tending to cotton and vegetable crops. More than one escape attempt was made by the Germans, all of which failed.

=== Sahuarita Bombing and Gunnery Range (1942–1978) ===
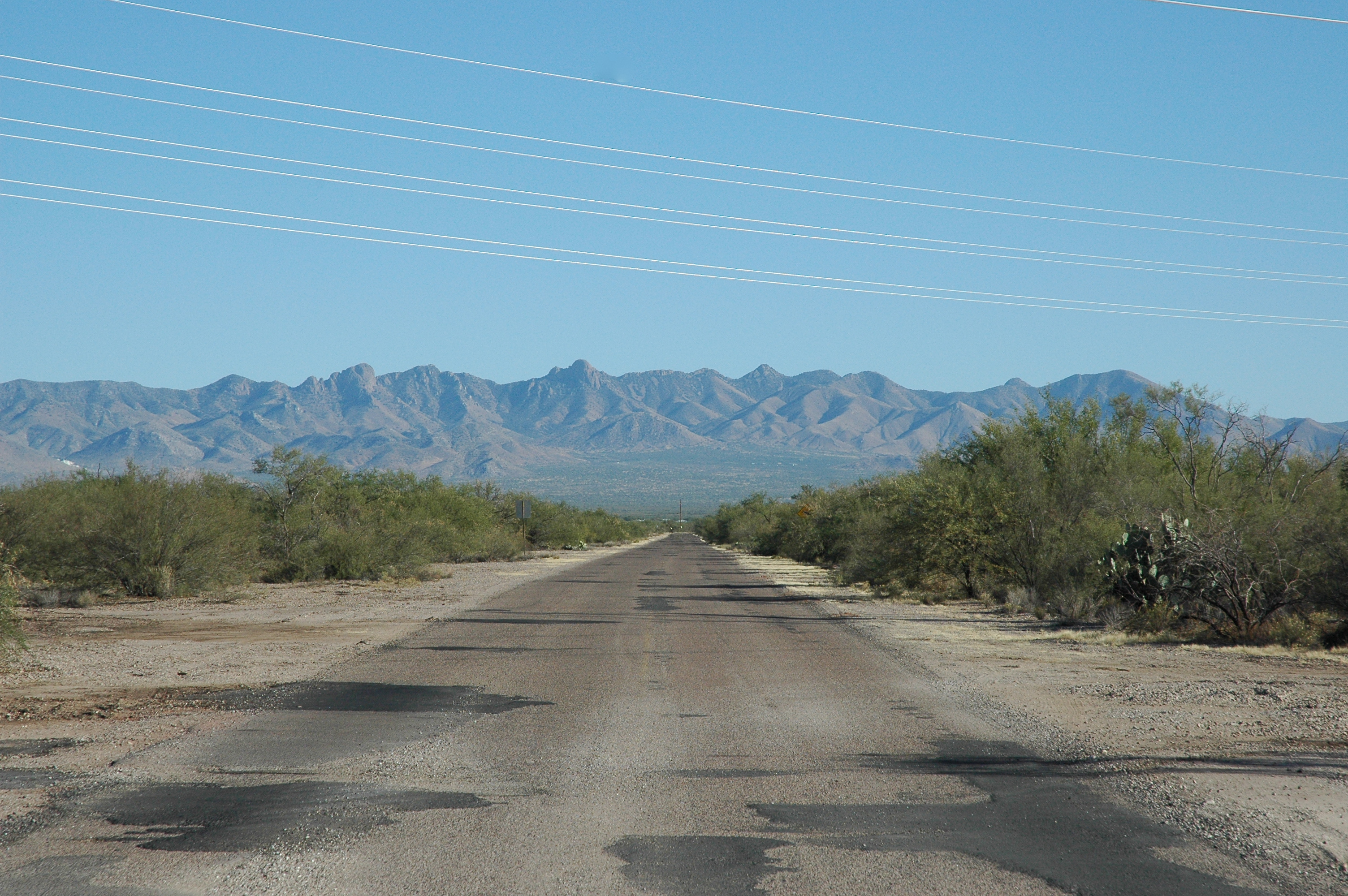
The former Sahuarita Airstrip, with the Santa Rita Mountains in the background (2007).

The United States Army Air Corps, from Davis–Monthan Air Force Base, first used this 27,046-acre (109.45 km^{2}) range in April 1942 for practice bombing runs. The Sahuarita Flight Strip was completed in 1943, with a 5,540-foot (1,690 m) paved runway, and the bombing runs ceased shortly thereafter. The site included 12 buildings in addition to the airstrip, and four observational towers. In 1950, bomber crews operating out of Carswell AFB, Texas, restarted bombing runs on the range, which would last until 1962, with the airway strip remaining in use as an emergency landing strip thereafter. The Federal government soon released the land to the State of Arizona in 1978, who in turn leased the land to a cattle rancher. The former airstrip has been converted into a roadway that leads to "Sahuarita Park", while the remaining land remains in use for cattle grazing.

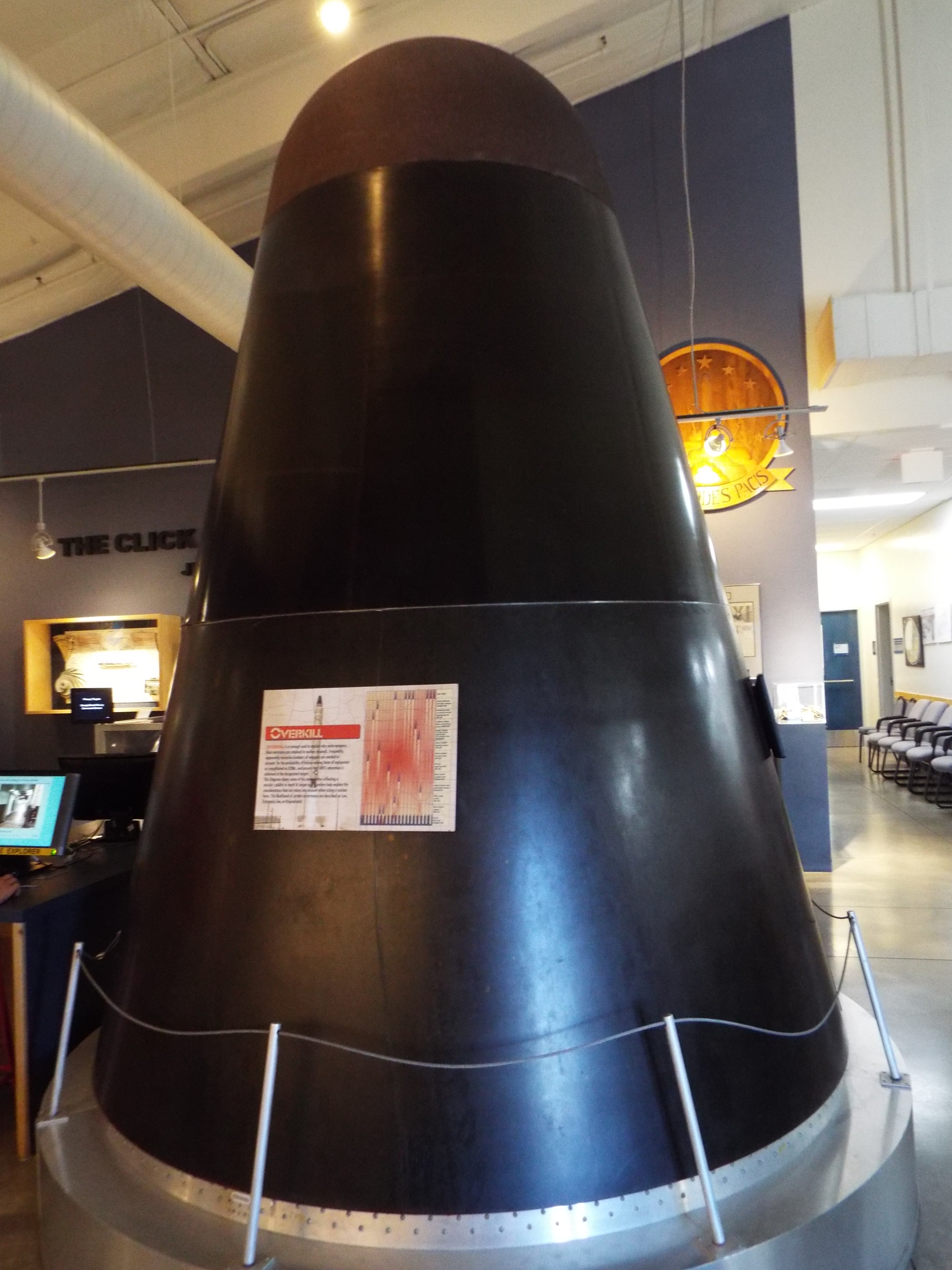
Titan Missile Nuclear Warhead exhibited in the Titan Missile Museum

The U.S. Army Corps of Engineers is continuing its longstanding efforts of identifying remaining munitions, preventing environmental contamination, and protecting several endangered species in the area, including jaguars, spotted owls, among others. Several different types of expended ammunition rounds can be found throughout the range, most of which found are 10 to 20 mm anti-aircraft rounds. Shrapnel from the dropped ordnance also litters the range, as well as dozens of crushed olive drab ammunition boxes. Shell casings and magazine clips can also be found, along with JATO tanks and large cross targets, constructed of wood with orange reflectors for visibility from the air. The crosses were used as targets for the airmen in training. Many United States Tobacco Company tins have been found, discarded by the several different aviators who occupied the area during its military days. The actual airstrip is now used as a road leading to Sahuarita Park and the Edge Charter School, both of which were built among the remains of the older air force buildings.(Sahuarita Park and the Edge Charter school no longer remain. Walden Grove High School was built in their place.)

=== Cold War ===
Sahuarita contains the Titan Missile Museum, built in 1963 during the height of the Cold War, which is the only Titan Missile site in the world accessible to the public. The actual Titan II missile, the most powerful nuclear missile on standby in the US, remains in the silo for visitors to see. The Sahuarita Airstrip continued to be used by the U.S. Air Force throughout most of the Cold War.

== Population ==
The population of the town was 1,629 in the 1990 census, while at the 2000 census, the population rose to 3,242. By 2010, the population rose to 25,259. The U.S. Census Bureau estimated that it had a population of 36,356 in 2023.

== Geography ==
Sahuarita is located at 31°55′45″N 110°58′56″W (31.929245, -110.982241). According to the United States Census Bureau, the town has a total area of 15.2 square miles (39 km^{2}), all land. Since the most recent census was taken in 2000, the town has annexed more land; its area is now approximately 30 mi^{2} (78 km^{2}). The Santa Cruz River (Arizona) runs through the desert town, flowing north towards Tucson, mostly during the monsoons, or extended climatic wet periods. Late 19th century and early 20th century still contained beaver in the river from Tucson, southwards. Madera Canyon, located just southeast of the town, is another important landmark, day trip site, and a birdwatching point.

=== Water sustainability ===
In the desert southwest, water sustainability is a major concern. According to a 2007 report by Pima County, 76,000 acre-feet (94,000,000 m^{3}) of water was pumped from the aquifer in the Upper Santa Cruz Valley in 2006 [in the report referred to as the Green Valley area, which includes Sahuarita], with 85 percent of that water being used for mining and agriculture. The remaining 15 percent was split between water used for golf courses and residential/commercial water use. The report explains that "The Green Valley area does not have a sustainable water supply given current groundwater pumping rates... the water table in Green Valley has been declining in past years, and is expected to decline even faster as water demands [continue to increase]...". The report concludes that "Water supplies will become critical within the next ten years."

The Upper Santa Cruz Valley has several "major water users", all pumping water out of the same aquifer. None of these are owned by Pima County, the town of Sahuarita, nor Green Valley. The major water users are all private companies: ASARCO-Mission Mine, Phelps Dodge Sierrita Mine; Farmers Water Company; Sahuarita Water Company, Las Quintas Serenas Water Company, Quail Creek Water Company, Community Water Company of Green Valley, and the Green Valley Water District. The proliferation of water companies can be partially explained by the fact that the actual water in the aquifer is not owned by anyone, thus any amount of water can be pumped out, with costs limited only to drilling, pumping, distribution, etc.

=== Sahuarita Lake ===
Sahuarita Lake is an artificial lake that was completed on June 22, 2001, by Rancho Sahuarita. The lake surface area is 435,600 square feet (40,470 m^{2}), with a 1-mile (1.6 km) long perimeter and maximum depth of 10 feet (3.0 m), holding approximately 70 acre-feet (86,000 m^{3}) of water. This reflects a water amount equivalent to less than one tenth of one percent (<0.1%) of the 76,000 acre-feet (94,000,000 m^{3}) of water used by all of Sahuarita and Green Valley in 2006.

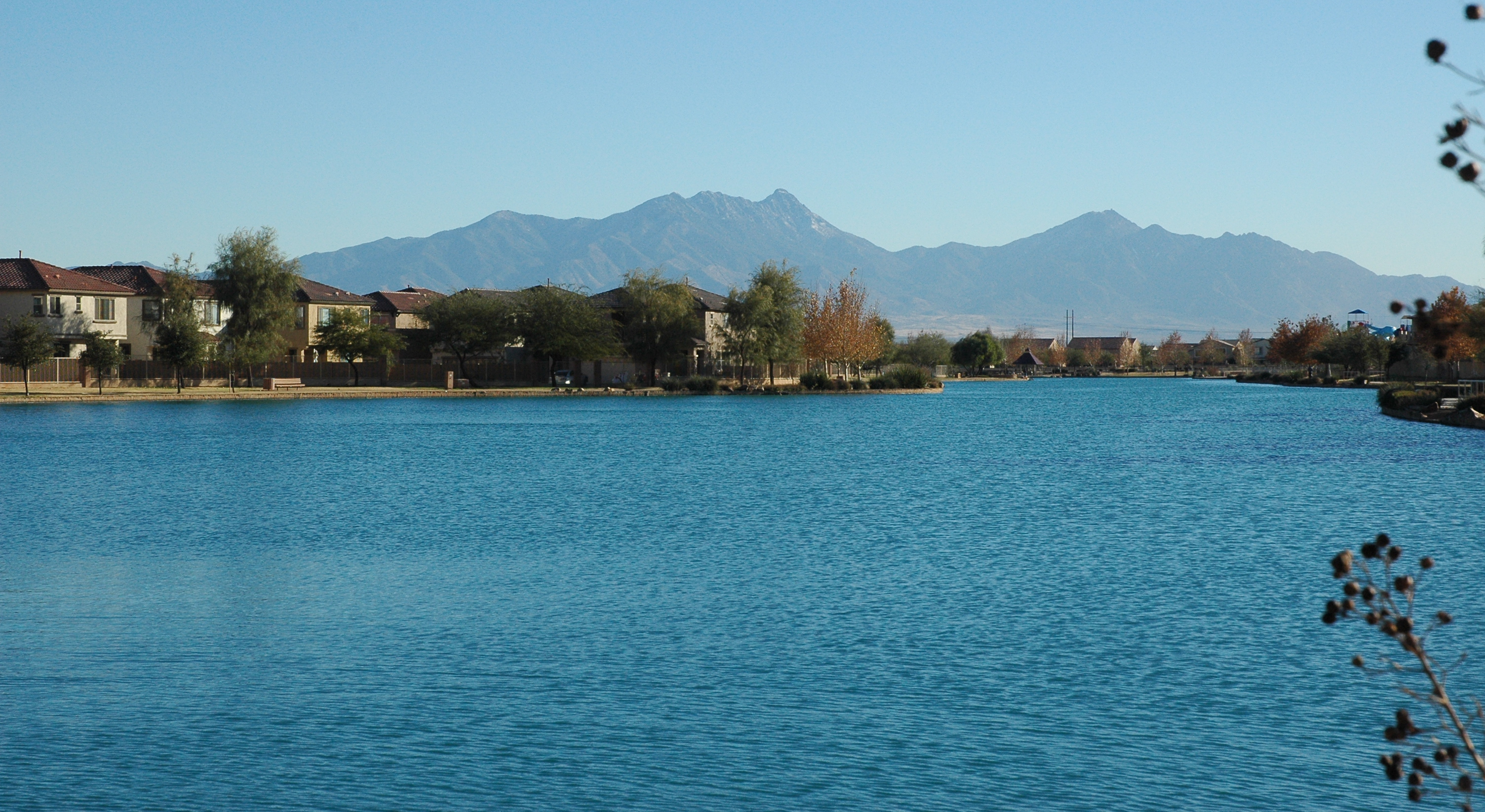
Northern view of Sahuarita Lake in December.

The lake is a "managed lake", which means that natural ecological changes within the lake that do "not fit within the parameters set by man", are cause for remedial action to return to the goals of the management plan. Air compressors located at various points under the lake continually inject air through diffusers which aids the movement of water in a process called vertical mixing. This system of continual aeration enables the circulation of all water in the lake on a daily basis, and therefore creates an ecological balance and uniform appearance. The lake also contains fish and frogs, the former of which are regularly stocked by the Arizona State Department of Game and Fish, and is an attraction to ducks and various kinds of birds.

The lake consumes water to the extent that all the water in the lake must be replenished every year. Regarding water evaporation, lake documents state that according to the USDA Water Conservation Laboratory in Phoenix, the mean annual evaporation rate for Sahuarita is 69 inches (1,800 mm) per year. This results in a mean water loss of 57.5 acre-feet (70,900 m^{3}) per year. Regarding water loss due to seepage, initial estimates indicated an annual loss of 10 acre-feet (12,000 m^{3}) of water, or 17% of total capacity per year. The J. Harlan Glenn Engineers that provided this estimate indicated that this equates to an "extremely low seepage rate". On average, 65 gpm (gallons of water per minute) must be pumped into the lake to maintain its current level. A nearby well site that draws on the shared Upper Santa Cruz Valley aquifer is used to refill the lake. In 2006, 105.3 acre-feet (129,900 m^{3}) of water was used for the entire Sahuarita lake park, which includes water for the 5 acres (20,000 m^{2}) of grass and restroom facilities.

== Demographics ==
Historical population
Census	Pop.	Note	%±
1990	1,629		—
2000	3,242		99.0%
2010	25,259		679.1%
2020	34,134		35.1%
U.S. Decennial Census

=== 2020 census ===
As of the 2020 census, Sahuarita had a population of 34,134. The median age was 39.7 years. 26.7% of residents were under the age of 18 and 24.1% of residents were 65 years of age or older. For every 100 females there were 93.8 males, and for every 100 females age 18 and over there were 90.4 males age 18 and over.

95.9% of residents lived in urban areas, while 4.1% lived in rural areas.

There were 12,367 households in Sahuarita, of which 36.5% had children under the age of 18 living in them. Of all households, 64.1% were married-couple households, 11.0% were households with a male householder and no spouse or partner present, and 19.5% were households with a female householder and no spouse or partner present. About 19.3% of all households were made up of individuals and 12.3% had someone living alone who was 65 years of age or older.

There were 13,426 housing units, of which 7.9% were vacant. The homeowner vacancy rate was 1.6% and the rental vacancy rate was 6.0%.

Racial composition as of the 2020 census
Race	Number	Percent
White	18,821	53.8%
Black or African American	1,156	2.6%
American Indian and Alaska Native	354	1%
Asian	414	1.8%
Native Hawaiian and Other Pacific Islander	86	0.3%
Some other race	3,491	10.2%
Two or more races	1,106	3.8%
Hispanic or Latino (of any race)	12,558	36.8%

=== 2010 census ===
As of the census of 2010, there were 25,259 people and 13,425 households residing in Sahuarita (a 679% increase since 2000). The population density was 841.9 people per square mile (325.1/km^{2}). The racial makeup of the town was 57.5% non-Hispanic White, 2.9% Black or African American, 1.3% Native American, 2.0% Asian, 9.1% from other races, and 4.2% from two or more races. 32.0% of the population were Hispanic or Latino.

In Sahuarita, the population had 29.7% under the age of 18, 55.5% from age 18 to age 64, and 14.7% who were 65 years of age or older. Sahuarita is 51.2% female, and 48.8% male.

=== 2000 census ===
As of the census of 2000, there were 3,242 people, 1,155 households, and 927 families residing in the town. The population density was 213.2 inhabitants per square mile (82.3/km^{2}). There were 1,247 housing units at an average density of 82.0 units per square mile (31.7 units/km^{2}). The racial makeup of the town was 87.9% White, 0.6% Black or African American, 1.1% Native American, 1.0% Asian, 7.4% from other races, and 2.1% from two or more races. 24.2% of the population were Hispanic or Latino of any race.

There were 1,155 households, out of which 33.4% had children under the age of 18 living with them, 70.6% were married couples living together, 6.8% had a female householder with no husband present, and 19.7% were non-families. 15.3% of all households were made up of individuals, and 5.1% had someone living alone who was 65 years of age or older. The average household size was 2.78 and the average family size was 3.09.

In the town, the population was spread out, with 25.6% under the age of 18, 7.2% from 18 to 24, 27.1% from 25 to 44, 24.7% from 45 to 64, and 15.4% who were 65 years of age or older. The median age was 38 years. For every 100 females, there were 96.7 males. For every 100 females age 18 and over, there were 98.4 males.

The median income for a household in the town was $53,194, and the median income for a family was $55,338. Males had a median income of $42,258 versus $26,174 for females. The per capita income for the town was $22,075. About 4.0% of families and 5.7% of the population were below the poverty line, including 6.6% of those under age 18 and 7.0% of those age 65 or over.

=== 2007 workforce survey ===
In April 2007, the Eller College of Management conducted an assessment survey of Sahuarita residents due to the town's 529% growth since the 2000 Census, because data from that census "on workforce and community characteristics is no longer applicable." The survey was mailed to 7,805 households and was weighted by area to ensure a representative sampling.

The survey reported that in educational attainment 19.7% of residents are high school graduates; 32.4% have an associate degree or some college; 26.9% have a bachelor's degree, and 14.6% have a master's degree, and 3.3% have a Doctoral degree. These statistics lead to the finding that "demonstrates significantly higher concentrations in associate’s, bachelor’s and graduate/professional degrees than the county as a whole, or the state."

For places of work, 57% of residents reported working in Tucson, with 16.6% working in Sahuarita, and 12.7% in Green Valley. It found that local workers specialized more than workers elsewhere in Pima County, being most concentrated in the following occupations:

- Management
- Business and financial
- Computer and mathematics
- Architecture and engineering
- Healthcare practitioner and technical
- Protective service

== Economy ==
Grupo México Asarco's Mission Complex mine is located in Sahuarita and is one of the town's largest employers.

=== Principal employers ===
According to Sahuarita's 2024 Comprehensive Annual Financial Report, the principal employers in the city are;

#	Employer	# of Employees
1	Sahuarita Unified School District	805
2	La Posada	472
3	Walmart	364
4	Fry's Food and Drug	271
5	Town of Sahuarita	198
6	Northwest Medical Center	166
7	Safeway	130

== Law and government ==
The Town of Sahuarita operates under the council-manager form of government. The Sahuarita town council is responsible for the policy matters of the town, and the management of a town manager to oversee staff and carry out the day-to-day functions of the town.

Sahuarita is administered by the seven member town council, which includes a Mayor and Vice Mayor. The Mayor and Vice Mayor are not elected into those positions, but are instead chosen among elected council members. The town council oversees all issues pertaining to Sahuarita, including residential and commercial development and natural preservation.

The Town of Sahuarita is a general law town, and does not have a town charter. As a result, Sahuarita operates fully under Title 9: Cities and Towns, of the Arizona Revised Statutes.

== Neighborhoods ==
Sahuarita contains the master planned communities of Rancho Sahuarita & Resort, one of the newest communities, (north), Quail Creek (southeast) and Madera Highlands (south) in addition to the residential neighborhoods of La Joya (southwest), Valle Verde del Norte (established in 1979), Los Colonias and Los Arroyos (west). The town has 92 acres (0.37 km^{2}; 37 ha) of public and private parks and recreation facilities, with approximately 125 acres (0.51 km^{2}; 51 ha) more parkland proposed.

== Town zoning ==
Since 2002, 30% of the land in the town is zoned for residential use, the majority of which (22%) is classed as medium density residential, defined as a single family suburban environment. Employment, commercial, institutional, and industrial land comprises 6.5% of town land, while mixed use zoning occupies 9% of land. The town has set aside 7% of land for resource conservation/open space, while 25% of land is designated flood plain.

== Education ==
Most of the municipality is in the Sahuarita Unified School District while a portion is in the Continental Elementary School District.

== Transportation ==
Sahuarita is served by Sun Shuttle service to and from Tucson but only on weekdays.

== See also ==
- List of cities and towns in Arizona
- East Sahuarita, Arizona
