= Calabasas, Arizona =

Ghost town in Santa Cruz County, Arizona, US

Coordinates: 31°28′02″N 110°58′31″W

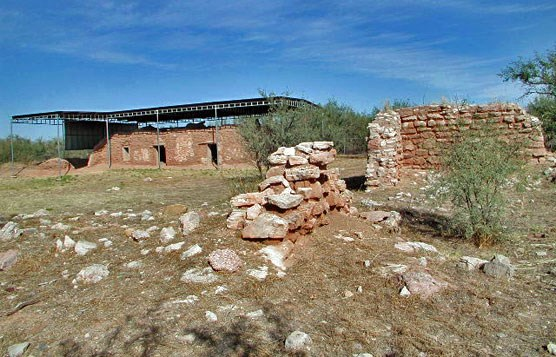
Ruins of the mission compound and church in Calabasas, Arizona.

Calabasas (Spanish for "pumpkins") is a former populated place or ghost town, within the census-designated place of Rio Rico, a suburb of Nogales in Santa Cruz County, Arizona, United States.

== History ==
=== 18th century ===
Originally settled by the Spanish in 1756 as Mission San Cayetano de Calabazas with seventy-eight O'odham to the site from their village of Toacuquita (Note: Alternate spellings include: Toac, Doac, Doag, Doaguquita, Toaguquita, Toaqui, Toaqui Xona.) nearer the Santa Cruz River to the new site on the bluffs above it to the east. A church report in 1772 described the mission as having a population 64: 21 men, 24 women and 19 children. It described the location as being on an open plain with good lands, but that the Indians do little or no farming, and that there was no church or house for the Missionary. However, by 1773 the church was functional and in 1775, Father Pedro Font said mass there during the first Juan Bautista de Anza expedition to the upper part of Las Californias.

In 1777, the mission church, houses and the granary filled with maize, were sacked and set afire during a raid by part of a band of Apache, apostate O’odham, and Seris that had similarly attacked Magdalena and other Pimería Alta communities during 1776. The mission O’odham killed fourteen of the raiders, but lost seven of their own. The Mission was abandoned in 1786 when the last of the O'odham left because of continuing hostilities by the Apaches.

=== 19th century ===
Between 1807 and 1830 the settlement area was used as an estancia (farm) for nearby Mission San José de Tumacácori. In 1808, Spanish settlers and Christian Indians moved into the Calabazas area and restored the chapel. In response, the Apaches again attacked in 1830, setting fire to the buildings and carrying off sacred vessels and vestments in the process. This discouraged anyone from living there for more than two decades, but vaqueros from Tumacácori continued to run cattle in the vicinity.

In 1837, the Mexican government built Presidio de Calabasas to protect the area. In 1844, Mission Calabasas and its lands were sold at auction to the brother-in-law of Sonoran governor Manuel María Gándara. Gandara established a rancho at the old mission stocked with 6,000 cattle and converted the church into a ranch house. The 1854 Gadsden Purchase, of land by the U.S. from México, included this area in New Mexico Territory. Mexican Army soldiers, in the Tucson garrison to protect the citizens from Apaches, withdrew from the Gadsden Purchase territory early in 1856. With their withdrawal the Gándara ranch came to an end and the land was leased to the U.S. Army by Gandara, now the ex-Governor of Sonora.

Late in 1856, the Mission church, now ranch house, became the temporary home of Major Enoch Steen, commander of four companies of the First Regiment of United States Dragoons who established Camp Moore, at the former Presidio de Calabasas, as the first military post in the New Mexico Territory's Gadsden Purchase area. Ignacio Pesqueira, the new governor of Sonora, allowed quartermaster wagons to cross into Sonora for supplies. Now with the arrival of military protection, the Gandara ranch, and the surrounding area filled with American squatters. The following year, Steen received orders from Colonel Benjamin Bonneville, the departmental commander in Santa Fe, to move closer to Tucson. Regarding the vices of Tucson as a danger to the good order and discipline of his troops, Steen instead moved his camp 25 miles (40.2 km) northeast to the headwaters of Sonoita Creek. The new post was named Fort Buchanan in honor of the recently inaugurated President James Buchanan. Subsequently, the former mission buildings served a number of purposes, a customs house in 1857 and the ranch house was occupied by family of Larcena Pennington Page before September 1859.

In January 1861, Apaches attacked Johnny Ward's ranch on Sonoita Creek near Calabasas, stealing cattle and abducting Ward's stepson, Féliz Martínez. Ward traveled upstream to Fort Buchanan and asked the commander Lieutenant Colonel Pitcairn Morrison to send troops east to Apache Pass to retrieve the boy and the cattle. Morrison sent a company under the command of Second Lieutenant George Nicholas Bascom, fresh from West Point. The ensuing Bascom Affair triggered the Apache Wars that would last for over two decades.

To make things worse, the Civil War began in April 1861, just as the Apache began their attacks. United States troops in the Santa Cruz Valley and every other post in Arizona were ordered east. To prevent it from being used by Confederate soldiers, Fort Buchanan was burned. Camp Lowell, near Tucson, was abandoned. Thinking they had defeated the Americans, the Apaches scavenged the abandoned forts and increased raiding in the Santa Cruz Valley. Almost every mine, ranch, and town had to be abandoned. The only places holding out against the Apaches were Tucson; Sylvester Mowry's silver mine, the Mowry Mine in the Patagonia Mountains, and the Pete Kitchen Ranch on Potrero Creek upstream from Camp Moore.

In September 1865, the California Volunteers garrison at Tubac, Arizona was transferred to Old Camp Moore at Calabasas and it was first named Post at Calabasas then Fort Mason in honor of General John S. Mason, who was then the commander of the District of Arizona. The 1st Battalion of Native Cavalry, California Volunteers and 7th Regiment California Volunteer Infantry occupied the post until they were relieved by troops of the United States Army in May 1866. Due to persistent malaria, the Regulars abandoned Fort Mason (now renamed Camp M) in October 1866 and established Camp Cameron.

Mission Calabazas was completely abandoned to ruin by 1878, with only a roofless shell remaining.

== Site today ==
There are two remaining sites with visible ruins or remains of this old settlement, the Mission site itself, which was subsequently at various times a farm, a rancho, a military fort Fort Mason, a custom house, post office and private residence before falling into ruin. It is now protected and part of the Tumacácori National Historical Park. There is the site of the 1837–1856 Mexican Presidio de Calabasas, which appears to be vacant land. There is also the Calabasas Cemetery established by the soldiers of Fort Mason during the American Civil War and subsequently used by locals.

There are also sites of the old Calabasas village, Calabasas Store (both now built over by modern development in Rio Rico) and the Santa Rita Hotel (once a fine hotel along the railroad line to Mexico), now a vacant piece of land near the old rail line and south of Sonita Creek, east of its confluence with the Santa Cruz River.

== See also ==
- List of ghost towns in Arizona
