= Presidio de Calabasas =

19th c. Mexican fortress

Coordinates: 31°26′36.96″N 110°57′49.68″W

Fort Calabasas
- Rio Rico, Arizona

Site information
- Type: Army fortification
- Controlled by: Arizona

Site history
- Built by: Mexico
- In use: 1837–1866

Garrison information
- Occupants: (Mexico) Mexican Army; United States Army (Confederate States of America) Confederate States Army

The Presidio de Calabasas, also known as Fort Calabasas or Camp Calabasas, was a stone fortress built by Mexico in 1837 south of Tumacacori, Arizona. It was built on the land of the Grant of Manuel María Gándara, by Gándara to protect his lands near the Mission San Cayetano de Calabazas from the Apache. Civilians established a small farming settlement called Calabasas, in the area nearby the protection of the Presidio.

Following the Gadsden Purchase, the United States Army stationed Major Enoch Steen and four companies of the 1st U.S. Dragoons, now the 1st U. S. Cavalry, at old Camp Calabasas on November 27, 1856. Major Steen renamed it Camp Moore. The site was abandoned in March 1857 for the new Fort Buchanan. During the American Civil War, Calabasas was briefly occupied by the Confederates in March 1862 before the arrival of the California Column in April. The Californians transferred their garrison at Tubac, Arizona to the site in September 1865 and renamed it Fort Mason, Arizona Territory. The 1st Battalion of Native Cavalry, California Volunteers and 7th Regiment California Volunteer Infantry occupied the post until relieved by troops of the Regular Army in May 1866. The Regulars abandoned Fort Mason due to persistent malaria in the fall of 1866 and established Camp Cameron. All these posts were located south of the confluence of Potrero Creek and the Santa Cruz River. Camp Cameron was established about 16 miles northeast of Calabasas and existed from October 1, 1866 to March 7, 1867.

== See also ==
- Larcena Pennington Page
- Tumacácori National Historical Park
