= Sobaipuri =

Protohistoric ethnic group in Arizona

The Sobaipuri were one of many Indigenous groups occupying Sonora and what is now Arizona at the time Europeans first entered the American Southwest. They were an O'odham group who occupied southern Arizona and northern Sonora (the Pimería Alta) in the 15th–19th centuries. They were a subgroup of the O'odham or Pima, surviving members of which include the residents of the San Xavier Indian Reseravation which is now part of the Tohono O'odham Nation.

Debate sometimes still arises as to whether the Sobaipuri and other O'odham groups are related to the prehistoric Hohokam who occupied a portion of the same geographic area and were present until about the 15th century. This question is sometimes phrased as the "Hohokam-Pima" or "Salado-Pima continuum", a phraseology that questions whether there is a connection between the prehistoric Hohokam and the first historic groups cited in the area. A key piece of the puzzle has recently been found when it was discovered that there was Sobaipuri (O'odham) present in the late prehistoric period (Seymour 2007a, 2011a, 2011b, 2014). Chronometric dates from multiple sites on the San Pedro and Santa Cruz rivers have produced evidence of Sobaipuri occupation in the 14th century (Seymour 2007, 2008, 2011a, 2011b) and some even earlier, perhaps as early as the 13th century. The position is no longer defensible that no one was present after 1400 CE and that there was a substantial population decline in the prehistoric period (Seymour 2007c,d, 2011a, 2011b). Traditional stories help confirm the idea that there was likely a clash between the newly arriving O'odham, including the Sobaipuri-O'odham and the extant groups including the Hohokam and Western Puebloan groups. The issue of a continuum is implausible because archaeological and oral histories demonstrate that the local residents intermixed with and became O'odham.

== Archaeology and history ==
The Sobaipuri were present when the first Europeans visited the area in the middle 16th century, thereby playing an important role in European contact and later the European colonization of Arizona. Marcos de Niza probably encountered this group along the San Pedro River in southeastern Arizona in 1539, although when Francisco Vázquez de Coronado followed less than a year later his party of explorers seems to have turned before reaching the Sobaipuri settlements (Seymour 2009a, 2011a).

Toward the end of Coronado's incursion into the American southwest, a temporary settlement associated with the Coronado expedition, San Geronimo III apparently was attacked and destroyed by the Sobaipuri O’odham people. Recent archaeological findings supporting this interpretation include what is thought to be the oldest firearm in the American Southwest. After this period, the Spanish did not re-enter the area for approximately 150 years (Seymour, D., Mapoles, W.P. Coronado’s Cannon: A 1539-42 Coronado Expedition Cannon Discovered in Arizona. Int J Histor Archaeol (2024). https://doi.org/10.1007/s10761-024-00761-7).

When Father Eusebio Kino first arrived in the area in 1691 he was greeted by leaders of this group. Headmen from San Cayetano del Tumacácori and perhaps other villages had come to Saric, Mexico from the north to ask that Kino visit them. Kino traveled north along the Santa Cruz River to San Cayetano de Tumacácori (later moved to the modern location of Tumacácori National Historical Park and renamed), where he found three native-made structures that had been constructed specially for him: a house, a kitchen, and one for saying mass (Bolton 1948). This visit to this first of the Spanish missions in the Sonoran Desert north of the current international border made this native Sobaipuri settlement the first mission in southern Arizona, or the first Jesuit mission in Arizona, but, contrary to popular notions, not the first mission in Arizona. This original native Sobaipuri settlement of San Cayetano del Tumacácori has been located archaeologically on the east side of the river (as shown on Kino's historic maps), providing evidence of a densely packed, well-planned, long-occupied village (Seymour 2007a, 2011a).

Kino then stopped by Guevavi (later referred to as Mission Los Santos Ángeles de Guevavi), which is located to the south along the Santa Cruz River. Here he later (1701) established a church which he ordered whitewashed. The location of this native settlement and this formal church has been identified (Seymour 1993, 1997, 2008b, 2011a). This native settlement later became the head mission for this region.

The Sobaipuris were initially friendly with their neighbors, including the Apache, Jocome, and Jano (Seymour 2007b, 2008a). They traded with one another and they were cited sometimes raiding together. They even intermarried, probably creating the unique character of the Sobaipuri. Later they sided with the Europeans which stressed their relationship with the unconverted tribes, because Sobaipuris then went into battle against the others.

== Archaeological research ==
The Sobaipuri are one of the most-studied protohistoric (or late prehistoric and early historic) groups in southern Arizona, although this is not saying much as the protohistoric (late prehistoric and early historic) are less studied than most other time periods, especially in this area. The accompanying list of references shows the upsurge of research in this group by archaeologists in the past 30 years.

Prior to this most of the research was conducted by historians. The first archaeological work was initiated by Charles C. Di Peso (1953, 1956) of the Amerind Foundation who established a program designed to understand the transition from prehistory to history. Although most of his conclusions about sites visited by Father Eusebio Kino have been discredited, Di Peso is recognized as a true scholar and he did define the first archaeological Sobaipuri site, making key contributions to the field, some of which are only recently being recognized. The other sites he thought might be Sobaipuri turned out to be late prehistoric sites representing Puebloan and other culture groups or the remnants of a later Spanish fort Santa Cruz de Terrenate.

Archaeologist Deni Seymour has studied the Sobaipuri for 30 years, revisiting some of the issues raised by Di Peso. On the San Pedro, Santa Cruz, and tributary drainages of Sonoita creek, Babocomari, and Aravaipi Seymour has documented more than 80 archaeological sites occupied by the Sobaipuri (Seymour 1989, 1990, 1993a). She has mapped portions of their extensive irrigation systems and noted how their agriculture-based villages drifted along the river margins as groups grew and splintered through time (Seymour 1990, 1993, 1997, 2003, 2011a, 2011b, 2013). Excavations on several Sobaipuri sites have led her to revise conclusions that have arisen from use of the documentary record alone.

In the early 1980s, archaeologist Bruce Masse (1981) excavated Sobaipuri sites on the lower (northern) San Pedro River, revising many of Di Peso's original perspectives and summarizing the state of knowledge about this group to that date.

Only a few residential sites have been found away from the rivers. Archaeologist Bruce Huckell (1994) documented three archaeological sites in the shadow of the Santa Rita Mountains north of Sonoita, Arizona. These sites were probably used seasonally for hunting and gathering or possibly as refuge sites to escape Spanish, or possibly Apache, domination.

== See also ==
- Tohono 'Odham
- Akimel O'odham (Pima People)
- Hia C-eḍ O'odham
- Ak-Chin O'odham
- Hohokam
- Apache
- Puebloans
