= Calabasas =

Calabasas may refer to:

- Calabasas, Arizona, former populated place in what is now Rio Rico, Arizona
- Calabasas, California, city in Los Angeles County, California

== See also ==
- Calabazas, or West Indian pumpkin
