= Oʼodham =

Indigenous Uto-Aztecan peoples

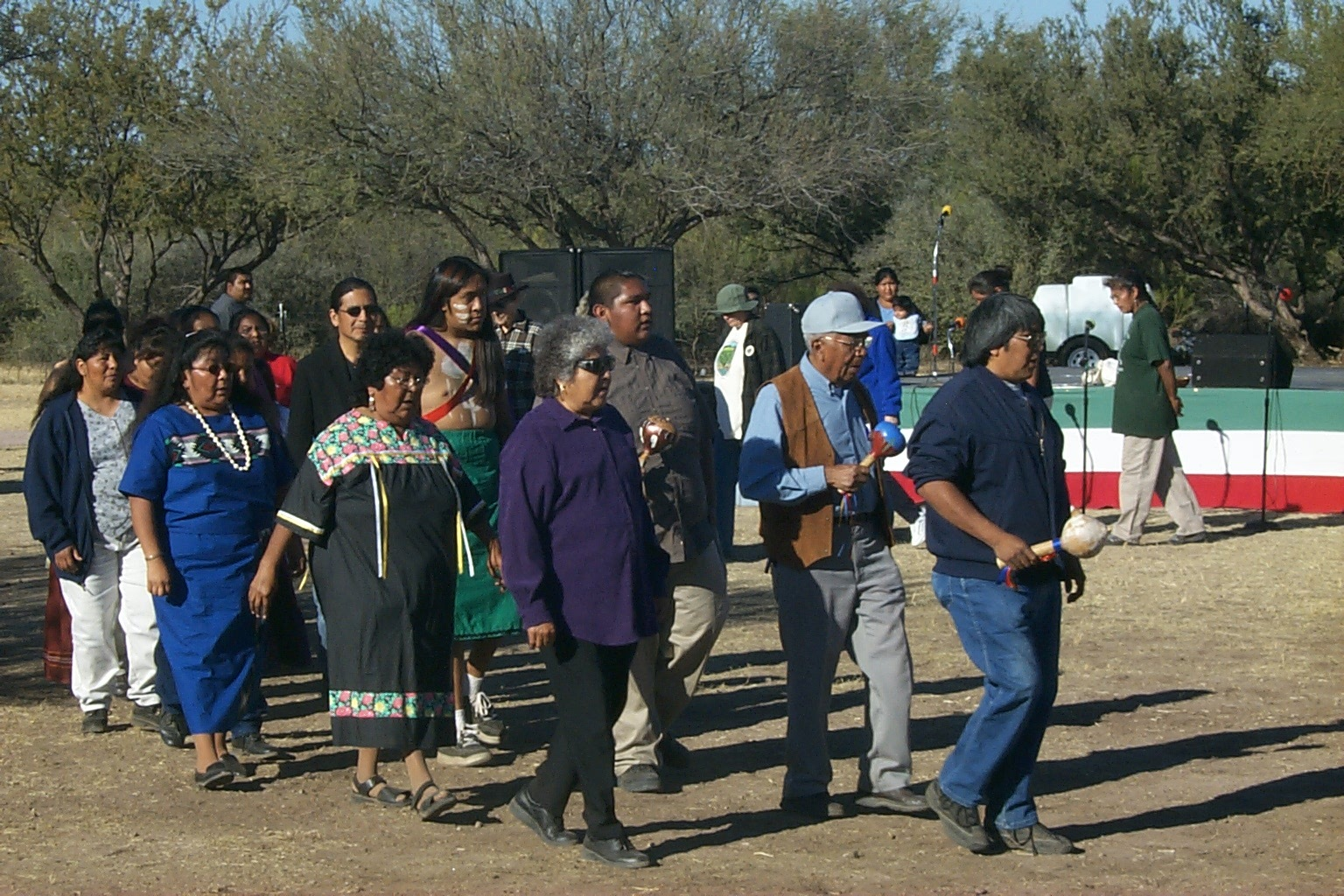
O'odham adults participating in the traditional circle dance, O'odham Cu:dk, in Tumacacori National Historical Park. Picture taken in 1999.

The Oʼodham, (Note: Alternate spellings include: Oʼodaam, Ootoma, or Odami.) Upper Oʼodham, or Upper Pima (Spanish: Pima Alto or Piatos) are a group of Native American peoples including the Akimel Oʼodham, the Tohono Oʼodham, and the Hia C-eḍ Oʼodham. Their historical territory is in the Sonoran Desert in southern and central Arizona and northern Sonora, and they are united by a common heritage language, the Oʼodham language. Today, many Oʼodham live in the Tohono Oʼodham Nation, the San Xavier Indian Reservation, the Gila River Indian Community, the Salt River Pima-Maricopa Indian Community, the Ak-Chin Indian Community or off-reservation in one of the cities or towns of Arizona.

They have also historically been referred to as Hímeris.

In the Oʼodham language, "Oʼodham" literally means "person," "man," or "human being."

== History ==
Most archaeologists believe the Oʼodham to be descended from the Hohokam, although some argue that one group invaded the other's territory.

As of the late 1600s, Oʼodham rancherías in the Santa Cruz River Valley included:

- Arivaca
- Ati
- Babisi
- Bacoancos
- Baihcat
- Basaraca
- Bisani
- Bucuacucan
- Calabasas
- Comacovitcam
- Esquobag
- Guevavi
- Hasohuvaibca
- Mamturss
- Obtuavo
- Piticai
- Raum
- Saacum
- Sicurisuta
- Sonoitac
- Sopic
- Sópori
- Spibah
- Stonssutag
- Suamca
- Supquituni
- Taupari
- Toacuquita
- Toamuqui
- Tubac
- Tuhto
- Tumacacori
- Tumigai
- Tupssi
- Tutumac
- Tutup
- Uaham
- Unbas
- Vaicat
- Gutzutaqui

== Language ==
The Oʼodham language, variously called Oʼodham ñeʼokĭ, Oʼodham ñiʼokĭ or Oʼotham ñiok, is spoken by all Oʼodham groups. There are certain dialectal differences, but they are mutually intelligible and all Oʼodham groups can understand one another. Lexicographical differences have arisen among the different groups, especially in reference to newer technologies and innovations.

== Oʼodham sub-groups ==
The Pima Alto or Upper Pima groups were subdivided by scholars on the basis of cultural, economic and linguistic differences into two main groupings:

One was known commonly as the Pima or River Pima. Since the late 20th century, they have been called by their own name, or endonym: Akimel Oʼotham

- Akimel Oʼodham (Akimel Au-Authm, meaning "River People", often simply called Pima, by outsiders, lived north of and along the Gila, the Salt, and the Santa Cruz rivers in what is today defined as Arizona)
  - Onʼk Akimel Oʼodham (Onʼk Akimel Au-Authm – "Salt River People," lived and farmed along the Salt River), now included in the Salt River Indian Reservation.
  - Keli Akimel O'otham (Keli Akimel Au-Authm, oft simply Akimel Oʼodham – "Gila River People", lived and farmed along the Gila River), now known as the Gila River Indian Community (GRIC)
- Ak-Chin Oʼodham (Ak-Chin Au-Authm), Ak-Chin Indian Community
- Sobaipuri, (also simply called Sobas, called by the neighboring Akimel Oʼodham as Ṣáṣavino – "spotted"), originally lived in the valleys of the San Pedro River and Upper Santa Cruz River. In the early 18th century, they were gradually driven out of the lower San Pedro River valley. In the middle of the century, their remaining settlements along the upper San Pedro River were broken up by Arivaipa and Pinaleño Apache attacks. They moved west, seeking refuge among the Tohono Oʼodham and Akimel Oʼodham, with whom they merged.

The other peoples are the Tohono Oʼodham or Desert Pima, enrolled in the Tohono Oʼodham Nation.

- Tohono Oʼodham ("Desert People"); the neighboring Akimel Oʼodham called them Pahpah Au-Authm or Ba꞉bawĭkoʼa – "eating tepary beans", which was pronounced Papago by the Spanish. They lived in the semi-arid deserts and mountains south of present-day Tucson, Tubac, and south of the Gila River
  - Kuitatk (kúí tátk)
  - Sikorhimat (sikol himadk)
  - Wahw Kihk (wáw kéˑkk)
  - San Pedro (wiwpul)
  - Tciaur (jiawul dáhăk)
  - Anegam (ʔáˑngam – "desert willow")
  - Imkah (ʔiˑmiga)
  - Tecolote (kolóˑdi, also cú´kud kúhūk)
- Hia C-eḍ Oʼodham ("Sand Dune People", also known by the neighboring Oʼodham as Hia Tadk Ku꞉mdam – "Sand Root Crushers," commonly known as "Sand Pimas," lived west and southwest of the Tohono Oʼodham in the Gran Desierto de Altar of the Sonoran Desert between the Ajo Range, the Gila River, the Colorado River and the Gulf of California south into northwestern Sonora, Mexico. There they were known to the Tohono Oʼodham as Uʼuva꞉k or Uʼuv Oopad, named after the Tinajas Altas Mountains.)
  - Areneños Pinacateños or Pinacateños (lived in the Sierra Pinacate, known as Cuk Doʼag by the Hia C-eḍ Oʼodham in the Cabeza Prieta Mountains in Arizona and Sonora)
  - Areneños (lived in the Gran Desierto around the mountains, which were home to the Areneños Pinacateños)

	Hia C-eḍ Oʼodham	Tohono Oʼodham	Akimel Oʼodham
Traditional homeland	Between the Ajo Range, the Gila River, the Colorado River and the Gulf of California	Desert south of the Gila River	Land around the Gila and Salt Rivers
Meaning of endonym	Sand Dune People	Desert People	River People
Habitation patterns	Nomadic ("no-villagers")	Separate winter and summer residences ("two-villagers")	Perennial habitation on rancherías ("one-villagers")
Prevalence of agriculture	Nearly 100% hunting and gathering	75% hunting and gathering, 25% agricultural	40% hunting and gathering, 60% agricultural
