= Fort Mason, Arizona Territory =

19th-century US military installation

Fort Mason
- Rio Rico, Arizona

Site information
- Type: Army fortification
- Controlled by: Arizona

Location
- Coordinates: 31°27′25″N 110°58′10″W

Site history
- Built by: (United States)
- In use: 1865–1866

Garrison information
- Occupants: California Volunteers and United States Army

Fort Mason was a United States Army fort in Calabasas, Arizona, in use from 1865 to 1866. The site was previously a military post called Camp Moore, occupied for four months from 1856 to 1857.

== History ==
Following the Gadsden Purchase, the United States Army sent Major Enoch Steen and four companies of the 1st U. S. Dragoons (now the 1st U. S. Cavalry) to occupy the former site of the Mexican Presidio de Calabasas. Major Steen arrived on November 27, 1856, and named his post Camp Moore. The dragoons put roofs on the old adobe structures and added a few new ones. Camp Moore was abandoned in March 1857 after another location in the San Rafael Valley was chosen for a permanent fort that was christened Fort Buchanan.

With the coming of the American Civil War all military posts in western New Mexico Territory (now Arizona) were abandoned. Old Camp Moore at Calabasas was briefly occupied by the Confederates in March 1862, just before the arrival of the California Column in April. The California Volunteers posted troops at Tucson and Tubac, and established Fort Bowie. In September 1865 the garrison at Tubac, Arizona was transferred to Old Camp Moore at Calabasas and it was first named "Post at Calabasas", then renamed Fort Mason in honor of General Mason, commander of the California Volunteers in Arizona. In 1866 it was briefly renamed "Camp McKee". The 1st Battalion of Native Cavalry, California Volunteers and 7th Regiment California Volunteer Infantry occupied the post until they were relieved by troops of the United States Army in May 1866. Due to persistent malaria, the Regulars abandoned Fort Mason (now Camp McKee) in 1866 and established Camp Cameron.

Camp Moore and Fort Mason were collocated south of the confluence of Potrero Creek and the Santa Cruz River. Camp Cameron was about 16 miles northeast of Fort Mason and existed from October 1, 1866 to March 7, 1867.

== See also ==
- Larcena Pennington Page
- Arizona Archaeological and Historical Society
- United States Military Posts on the Mexico Border (1856 to Present)
