= Pete Kitchen Ranch =

Historic American ranch in Arizona

- Kitchen, Pete, Ranch
- U.S. National Register of Historic Places
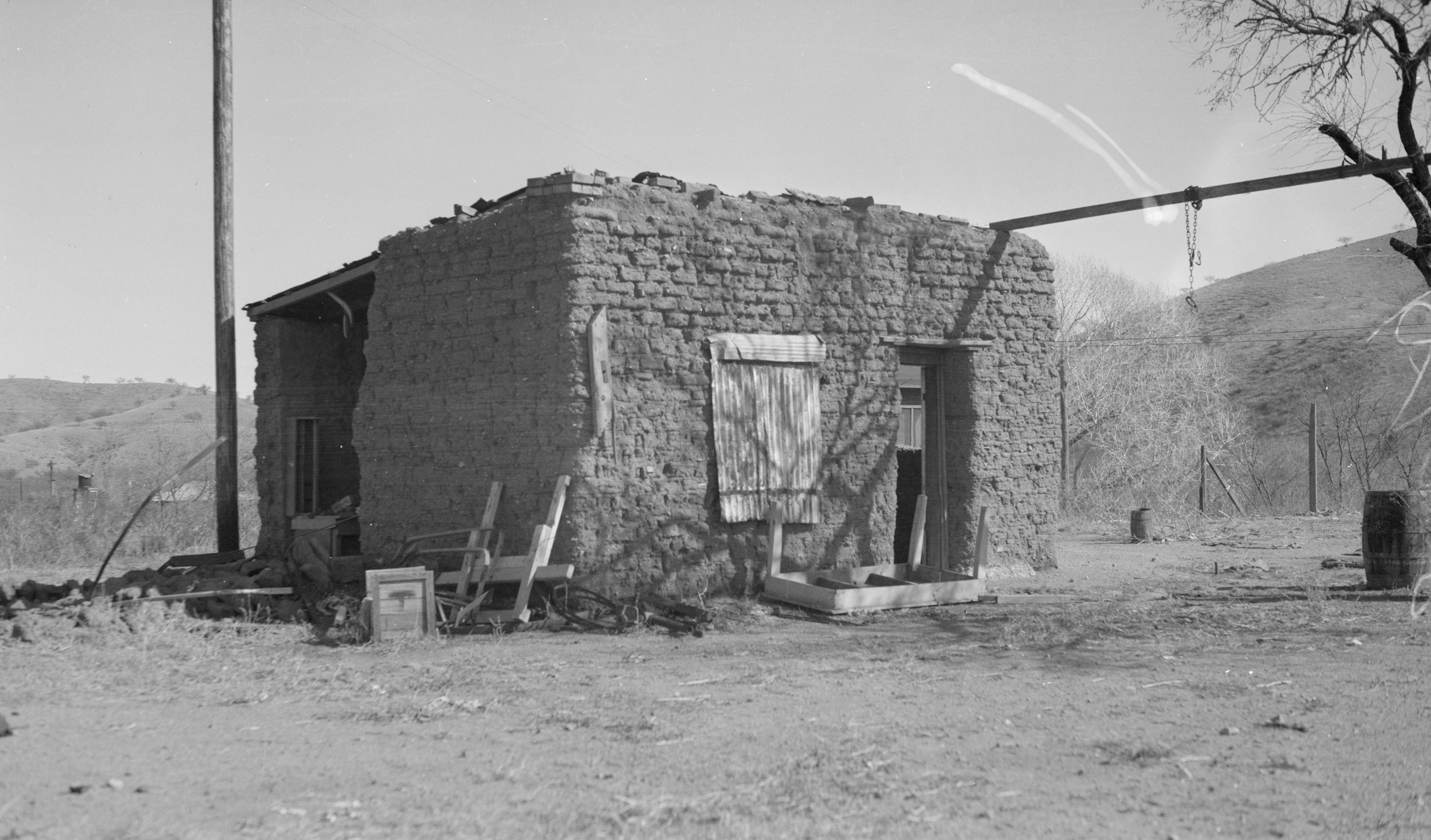
- Historic American Buildings Survey image of the Kitchen Ranch

- Location within Arizona Location within the United States
- Nearest city: Nogales, Arizona
- Coordinates: 31°24′8″N 110°57′16″W
- Area: 5 acres (2.0 ha)
- Built: 1862
- NRHP reference No.: 75000360
- Added to NRHP: February 20, 1975

The Pete Kitchen Ranch was established on Potrero Creek near Nogales, Arizona Territory, about 1862, reputedly the first permanent American ranch in Arizona. The site, which had good access to water, had been inhabited in prehistory and had been visited by Juan Bautista de Anza in October 1774, who called it Las Lagunas, a name also used by Kitchen. By the 1870s, the ranch was producing substantial crops and livestock that yielded an income of $10,000 a year. "Pete Kitchen hams" were a major portion of the business. In 1883, Kitchen sold the ranch for a substantial amount of money after the arrival of the railroad cut into his market. He continued to maintain mining and cattle interests and retired to Tucson, losing his money to gambling and loans to friends. Kitchen died on August 5, 1895, at age 77.

== Description ==
The main ranch house is an L-shaped stone structure with log lintels and a flat roof. The roof is surrounded by a 4-foot (1.2 m) parapet that functioned as a shelter for sentries watching for Apache raiding parties. There were two main rooms and a kitchen downstairs. A variety of additions were made, and several smaller structures once existed on the site. Dugout caves sheltered some workers. The site covers 5 acres (2.0 ha). During the time that the ranch was a frontier museum, several structures were reconstructed.

The Pete Kitchen Ranch was placed on the National Register of Historic Places on February 10, 1975. The ranch building survives as part of a restaurant in Nogales.

The actor Cameron Mitchell portrayed Pete Kitchen in the 1960 episode, "Pete Kitchen's Wedding Night" on the syndicated television anthology series, Death Valley Days, hosted by Stanley Andrews. In the story line, Kitchen battles Apache Indians even on his wedding day and night. Barbara Luna played his bride, Dona Rosa.
