= Mission San José de Tumacácori =

19th-century Franciscan mission in Arizona

Coordinates: 31.568430°N 111.050883°W

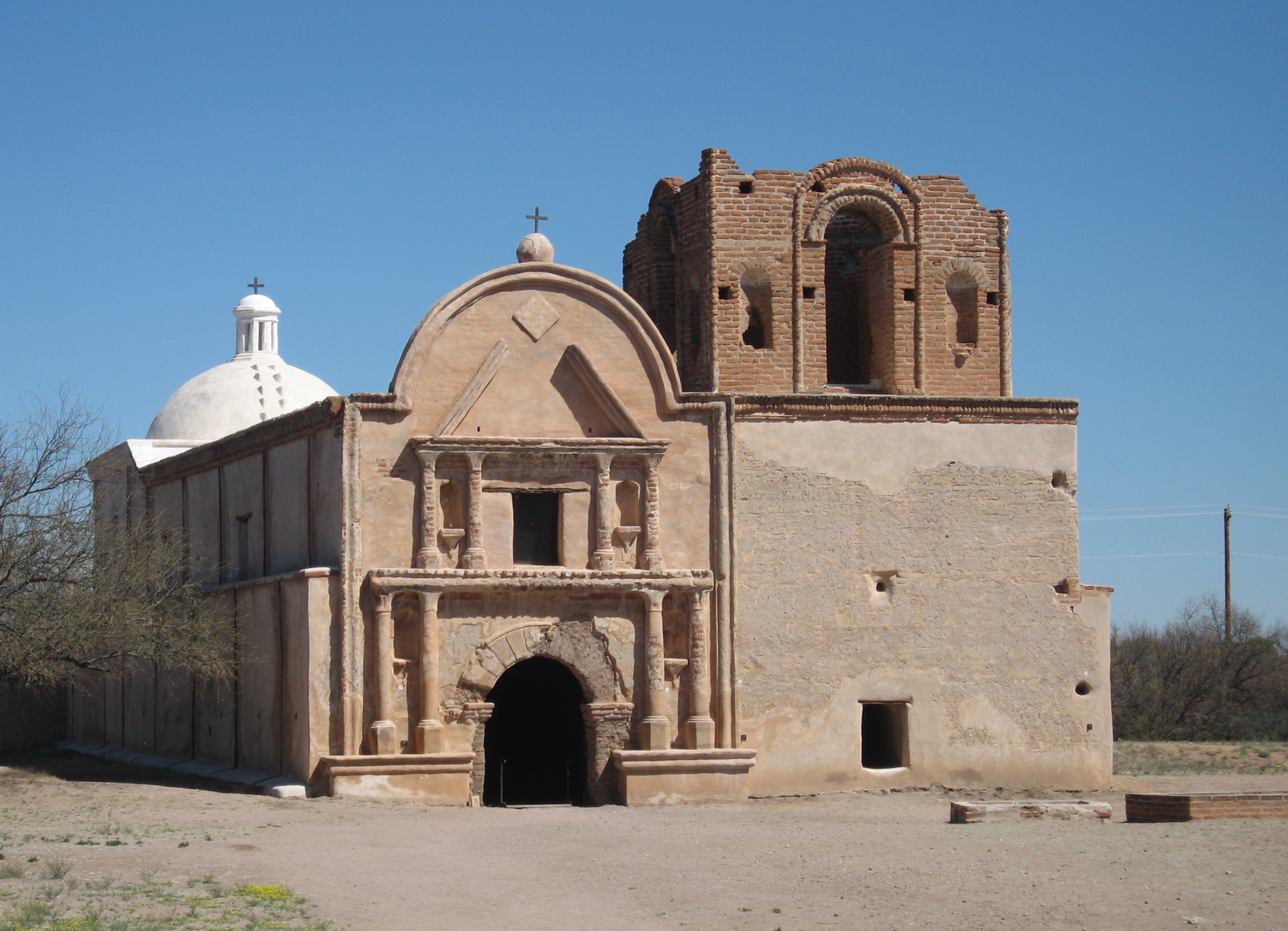
- The chapel of Mission San José de Tumacácori
- Location: near Nogales, Arizona
- Name as founded: La Misión San José de Tumacácori
- English translation: The Mission of Saint Joseph of the Crooked Limestone Place
- Patron: Saint Joseph
- Founded: January 1691; 335 years ago
- Founded by: Father Eusebio Francisco Kino
- Native tribe(s) Spanish name(s): Pima
- Governing body: National Park Service
- Current use: Nonextant (San Cayetano); Historic Monument (San José)

Mission San José de Tumacácori (O'odham: Cemagĭ Gakolig crooked limestone place) is a historic Spanish mission near Nogales, Arizona, preserved in its present form by Franciscans in 1828.

== History ==
Mission San Cayetano del Tumacácori was established by Jesuits in 1691 in a location near a Sobaipuri settlement on the east side of the Santa Cruz River. Services were held in a small adobe structure built by the inhabitants of the village.

After the O'odham rebellion of 1751 the mission was abandoned for a time. In 1752, the village was reestablished and in 1753 the church of the Mission San José de Tumacácori began construction at the present site on the west side of the Santa Cruz River. This first church structure was erected for use by the mission in 1757. The architectural style of the church is Spanish Colonial.

Rumors spread within the Spanish kingdom that the Jesuit priests had amassed a fortune on the peninsula and were becoming very powerful. On February 3, 1768 King Carlos III ordered the Jesuits forcibly expelled from the Viceroyalty of New Spain (colonial México) and returned to Spain. They were replaced by Franciscan missionaries.

Alejo García Conde, intendant-governor of Arizpe, officially granted the mission land to the resident O'odham in response to an 1806 petition. The initial grant, made on December 17, 1806, included a fundo legal and an estancia. A series of interviews with natives and legal decisions in 1807 clarified and extended the boundaries of the mission.

The deed to Tumacácori was lost in 1841. The mission was declared abandoned in 1843, and accordingly auctioned in 1844. Francisco Alejandro de Aguilar purchased it for five hundred pesos, on behalf of his brother-in-law, Manuel María Gándara. A small O'odham community continued to live and farm on the mission, until an 1848 Apache attack killed nine of them and the survivors abandoned the site.

The mission is now part of the 360 acres (1.5 km^{2}) of Tumacácori National Historical Park, which contains three separate sections and is open to the public daily.

== Missionaries ==
Like most missions in New Spain, Tumacácori was staffed by Jesuit missionaries until the 1768 Jesuit expulsion from Mexico, and Franciscan missionaries afterwards.

- Narciso Gutiérrez (1794–1820)
- Juan Bautista Estelric
- Ramón Liberós

== Historic Mission San José de Tumacácori gallery ==
These are images of the inside of the Tumacacori Mission and of the Cemetery grounds.

Historic structures in Tumacacori

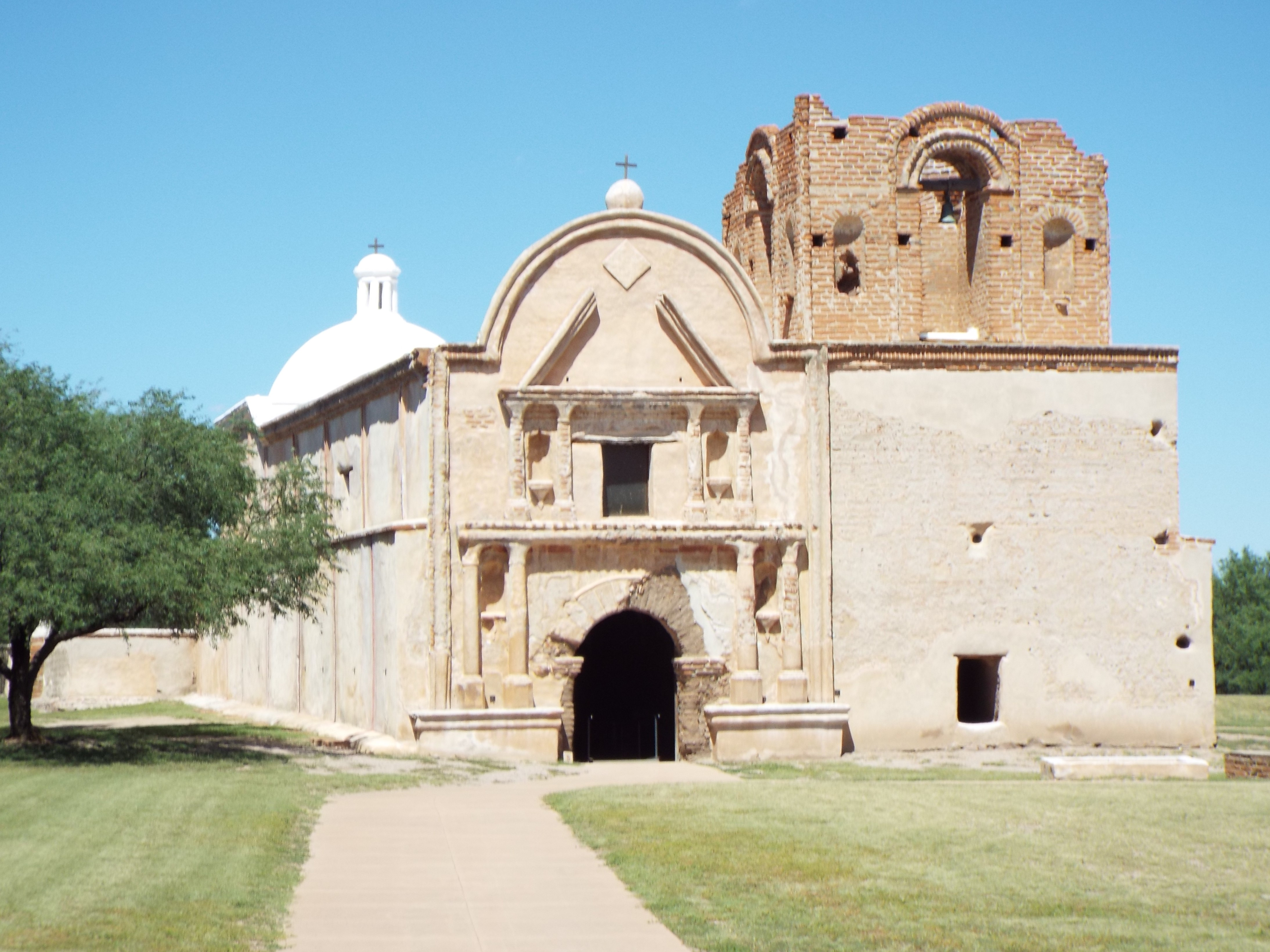
Mission San José de Tumacácori

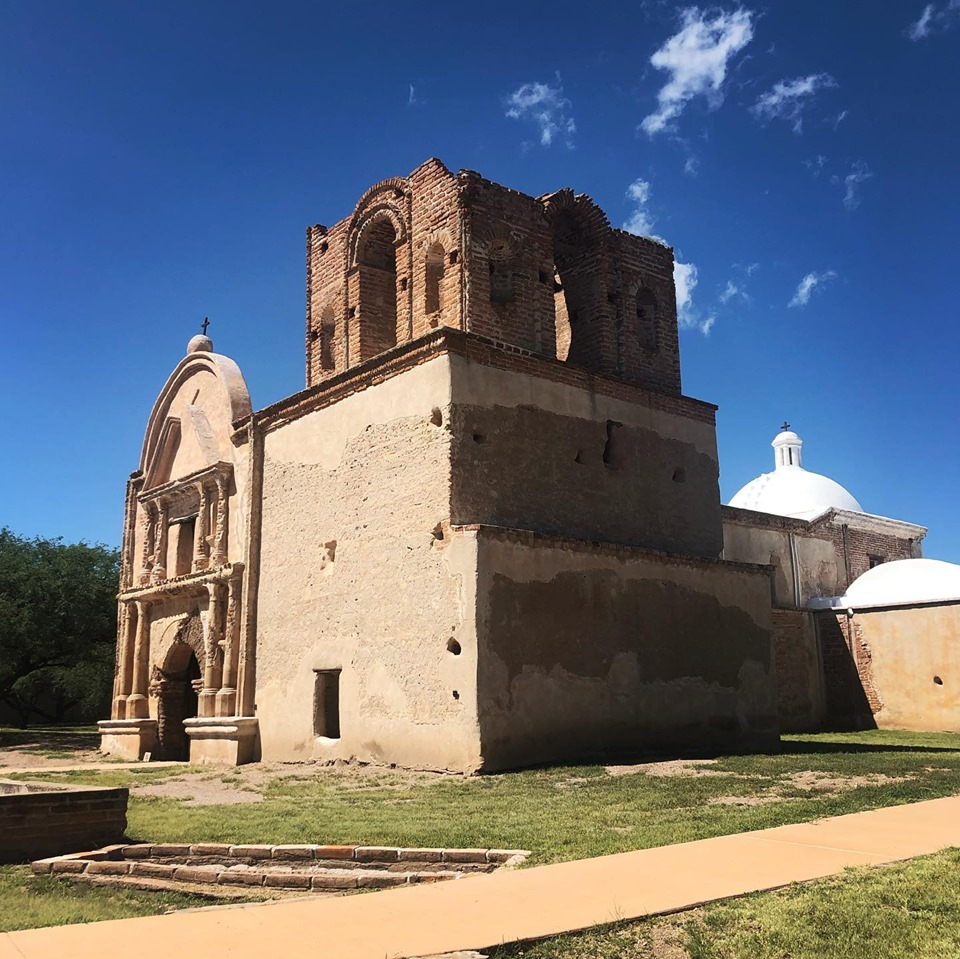
Mission San José de Tumacácori

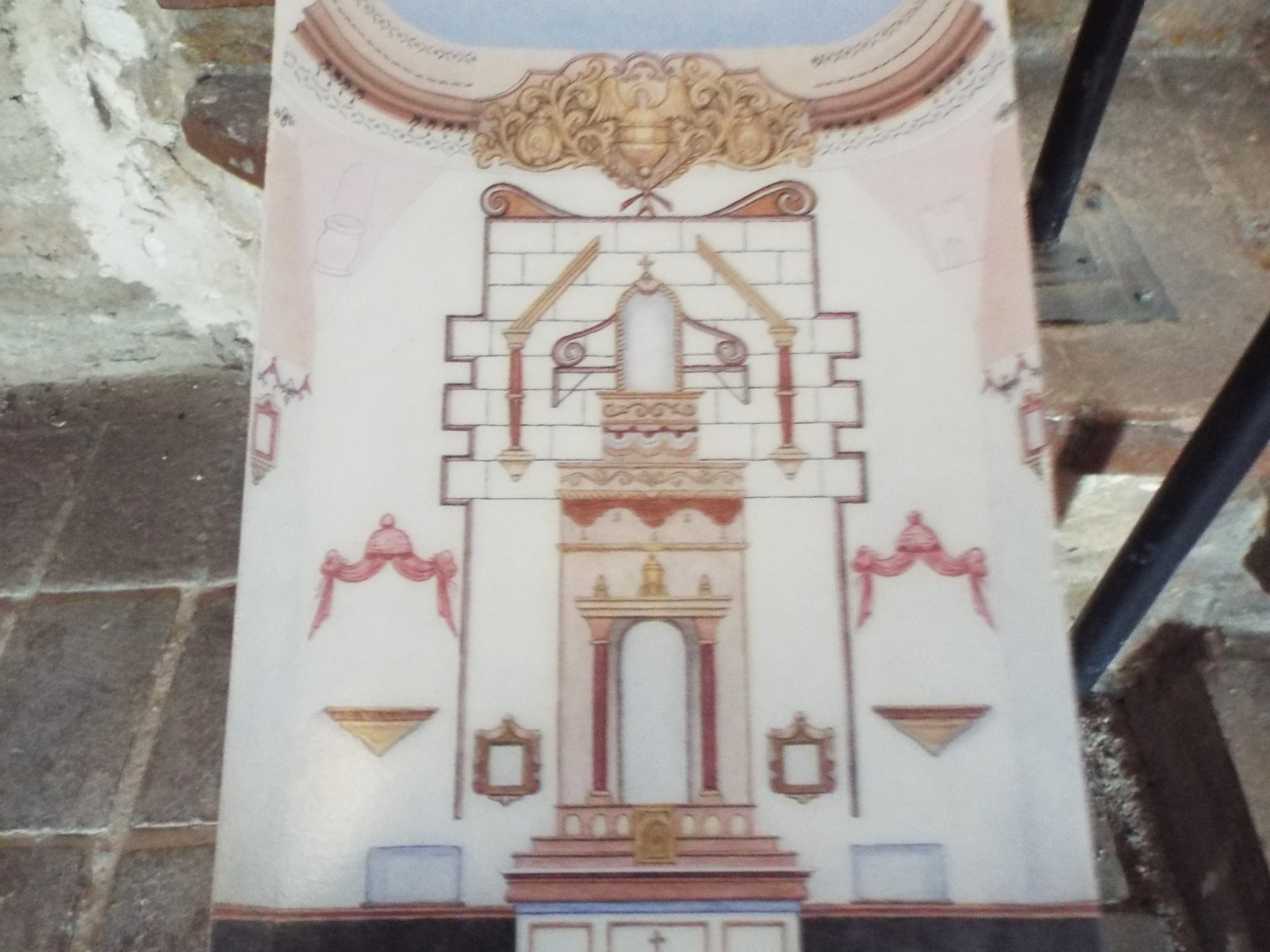
Sanctuary as it once looked

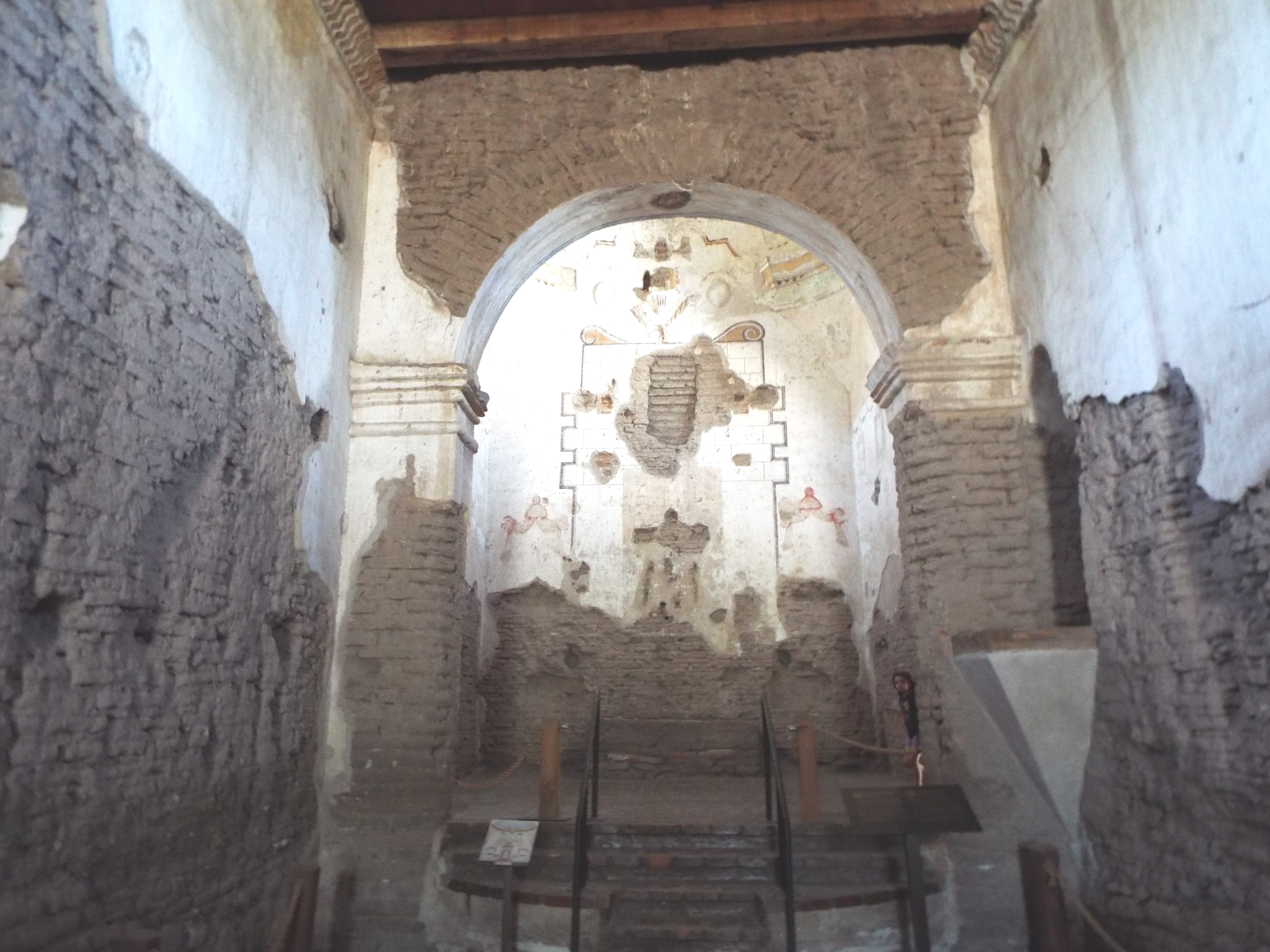
Sanctuary as it looks now

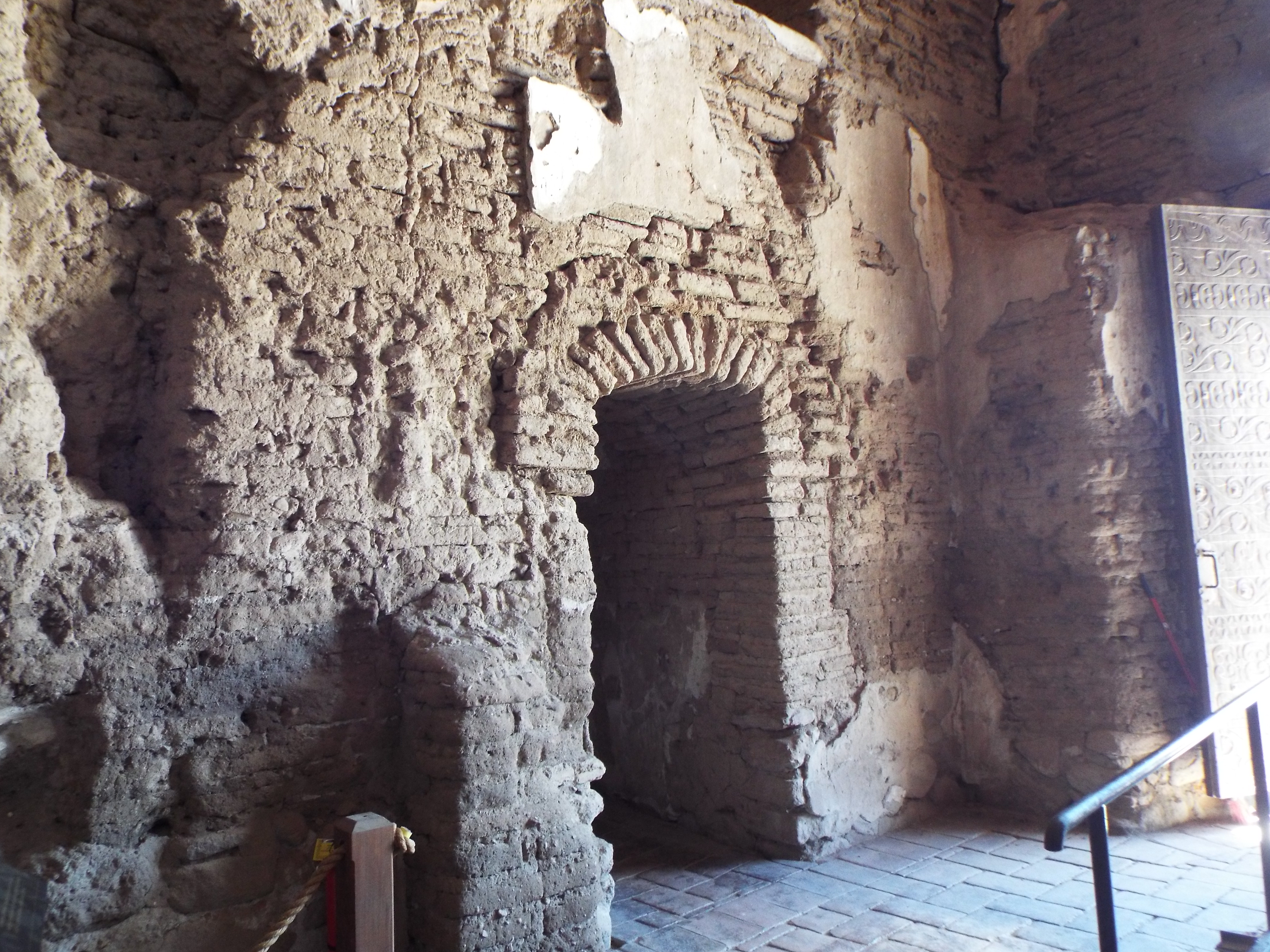
Inside Mission San José de Tumacácori

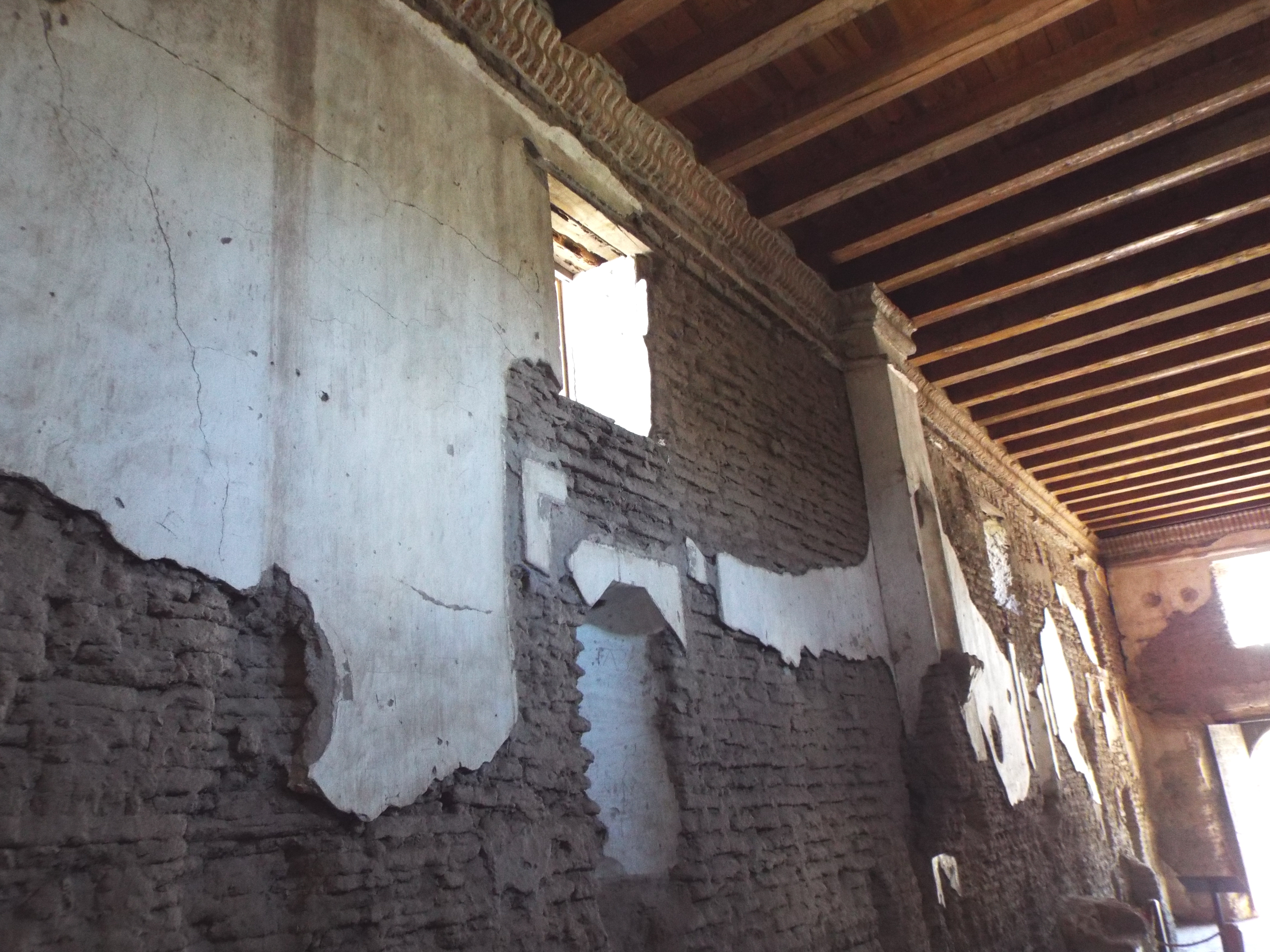
Another view inside Mission San José de Tumacácori

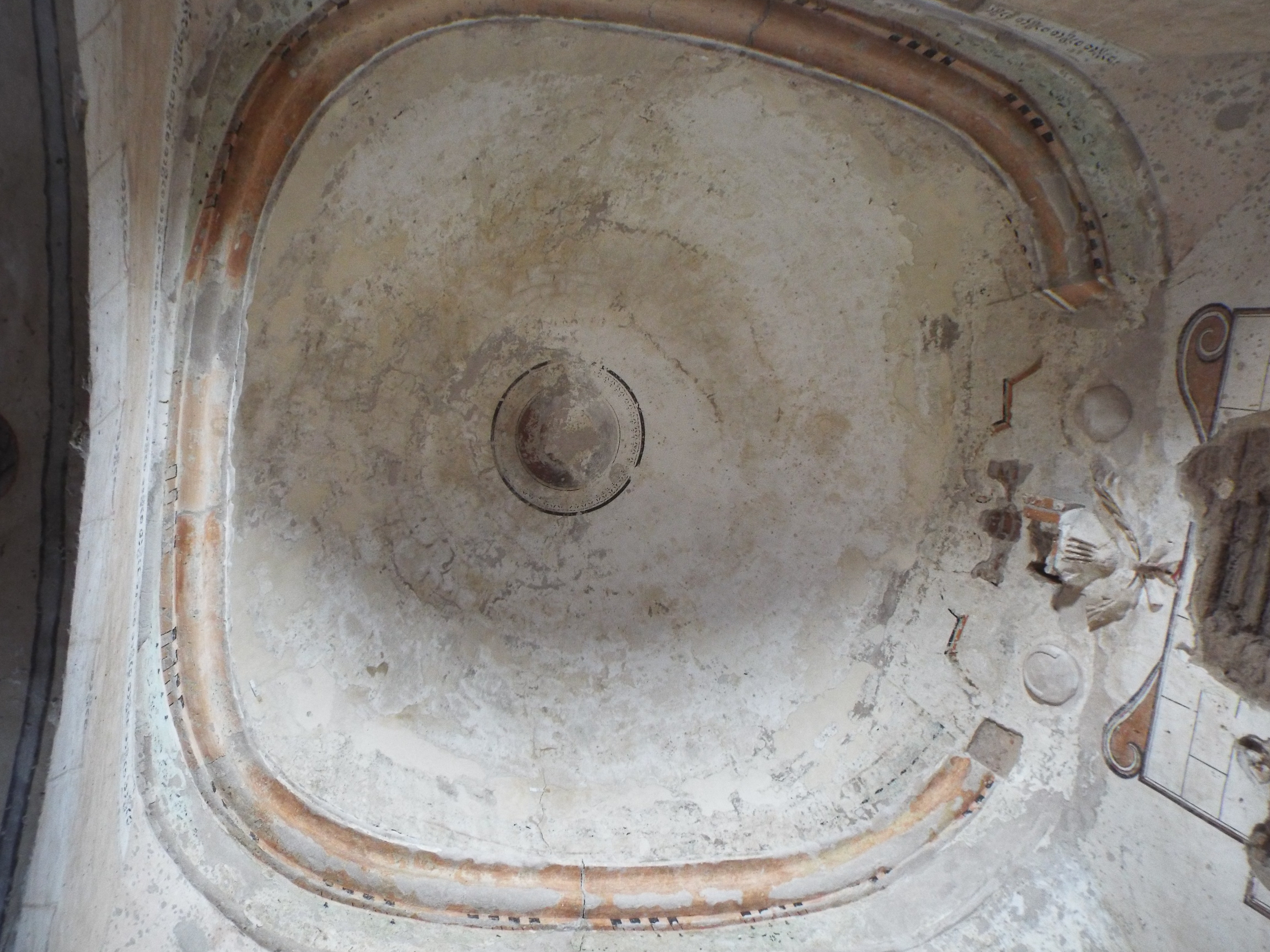
Rotunda

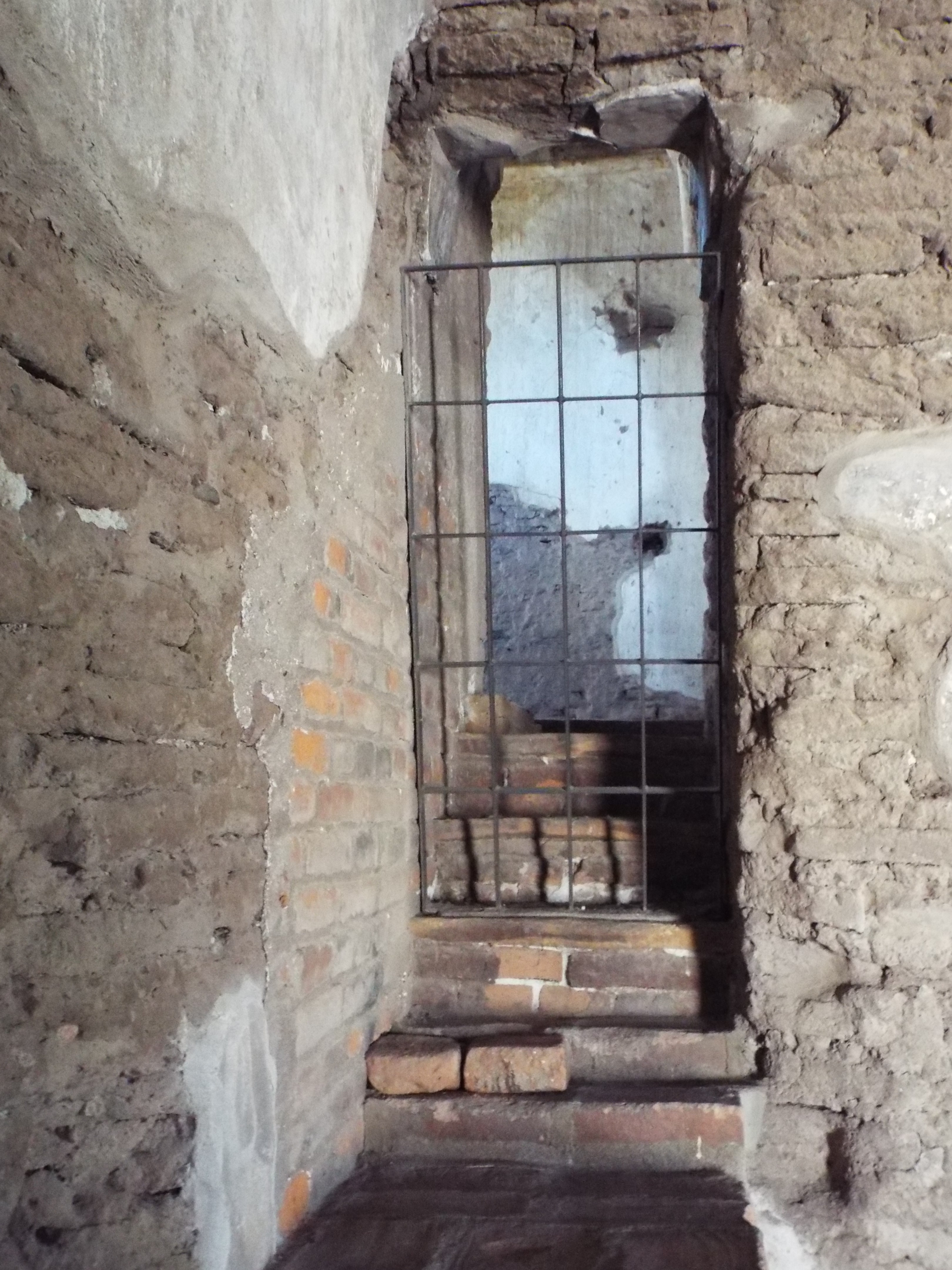
Sacristy

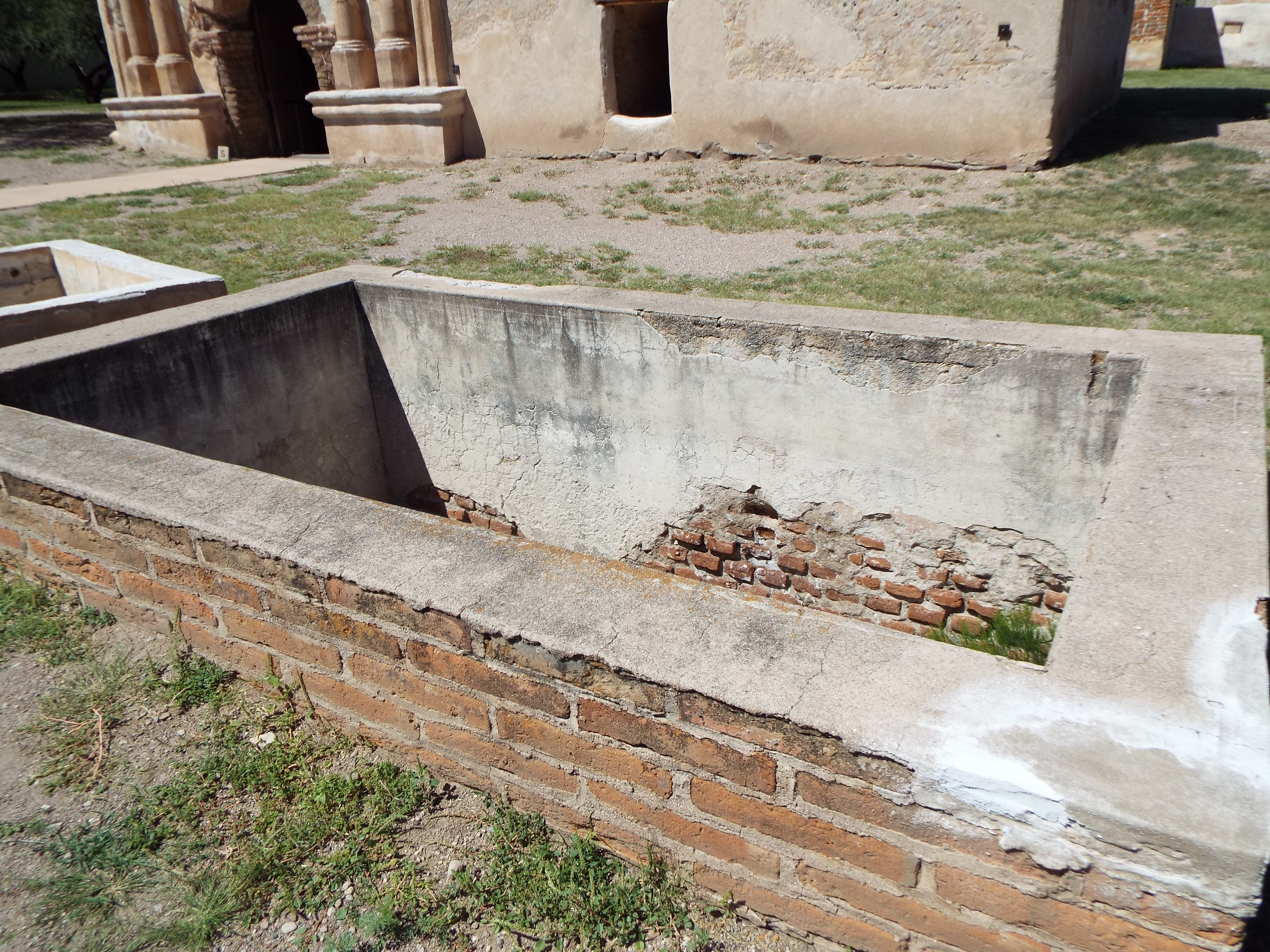
Mission Fountain

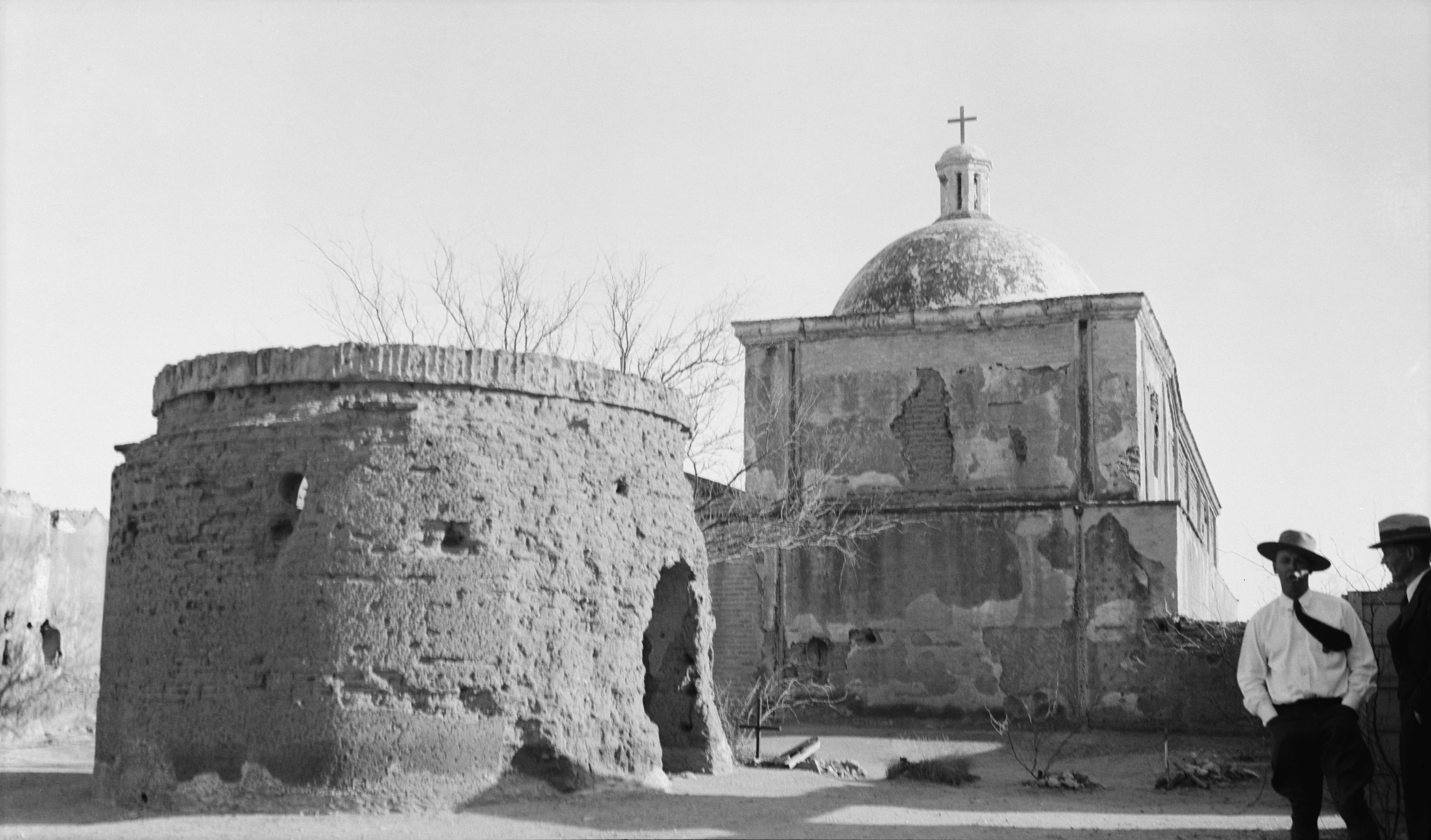
Mortuary chapel' and rear of church, 1937

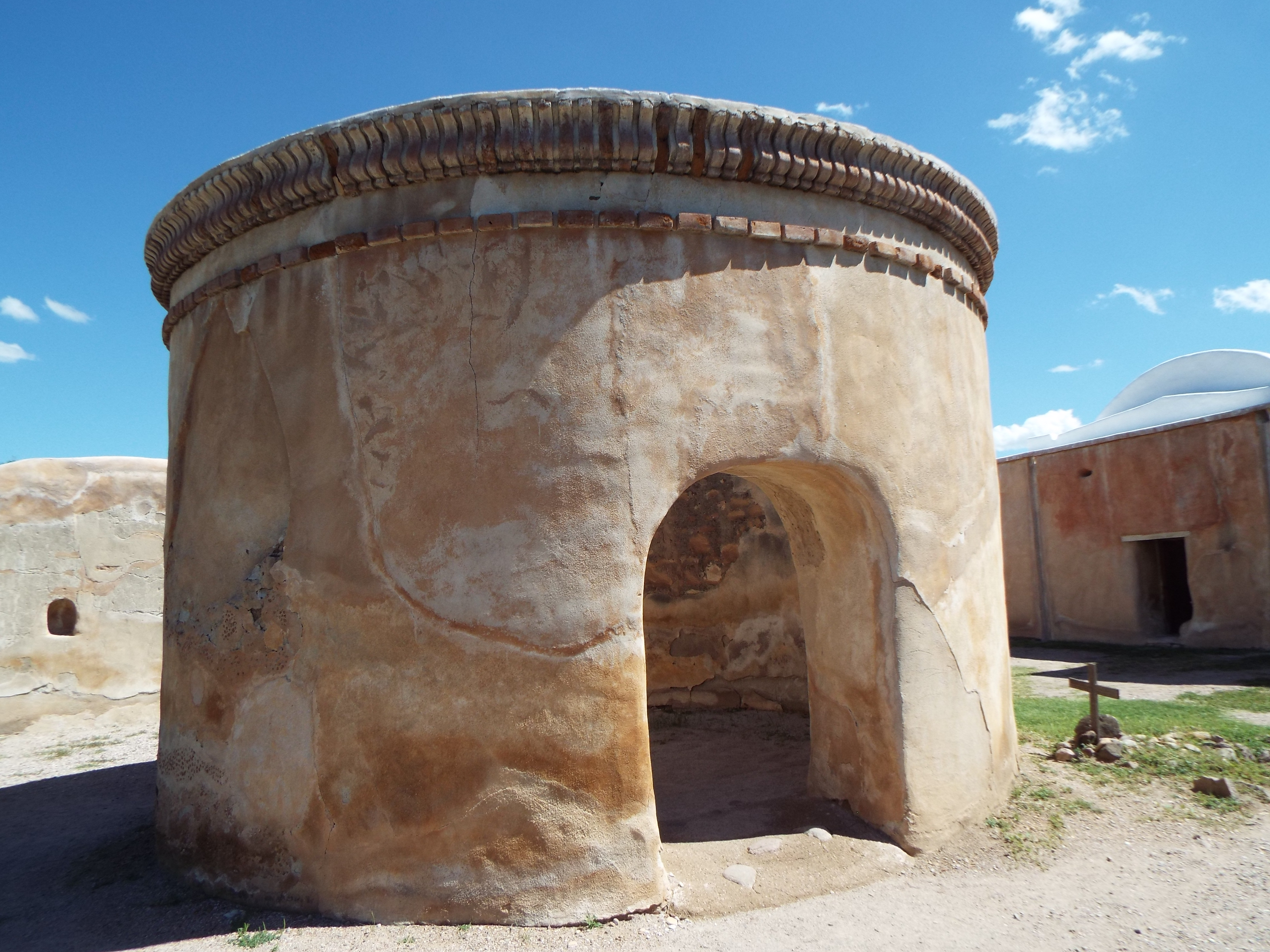
Mortuary Chapel

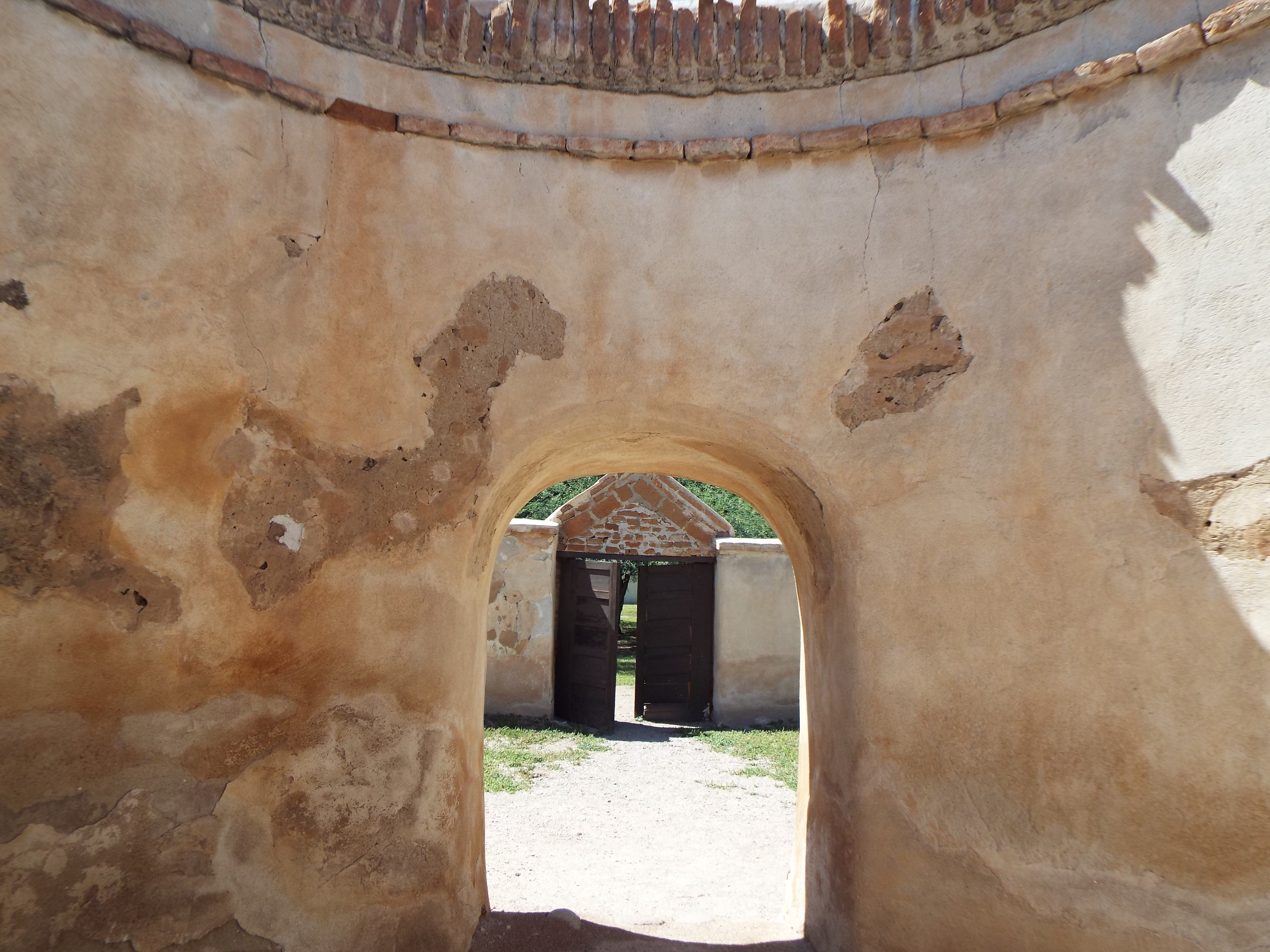
Inside the Mortuary Chapel

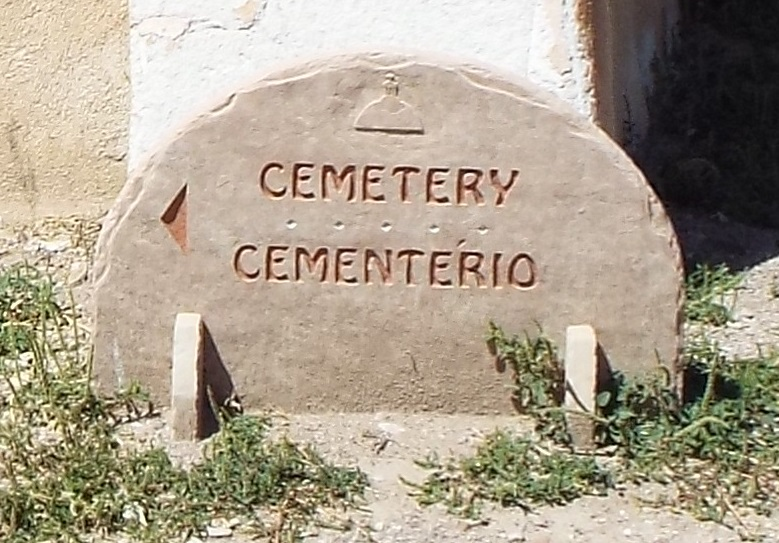
Tumacacori Cemetery

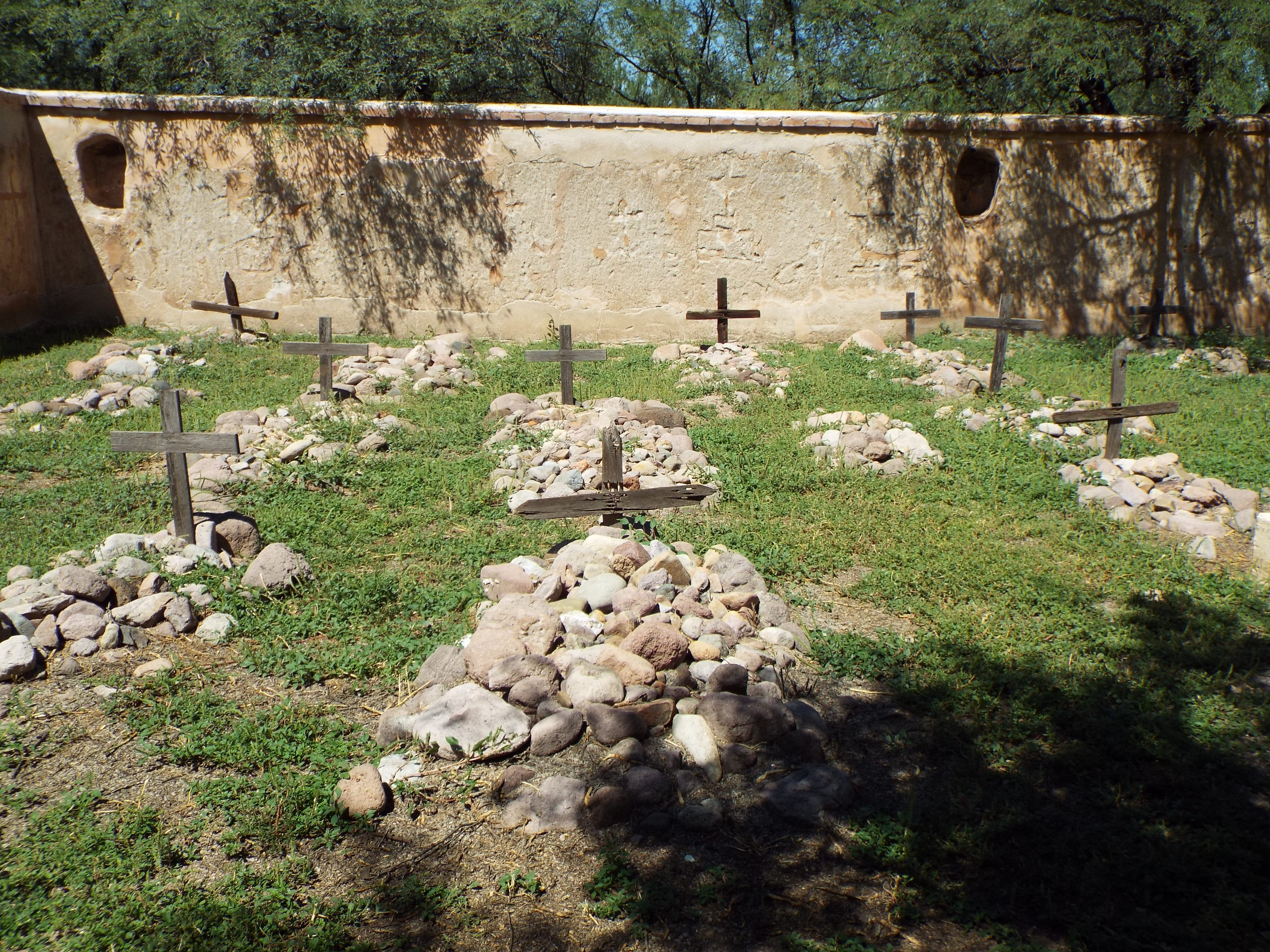
Tumacacori Cemetery graves

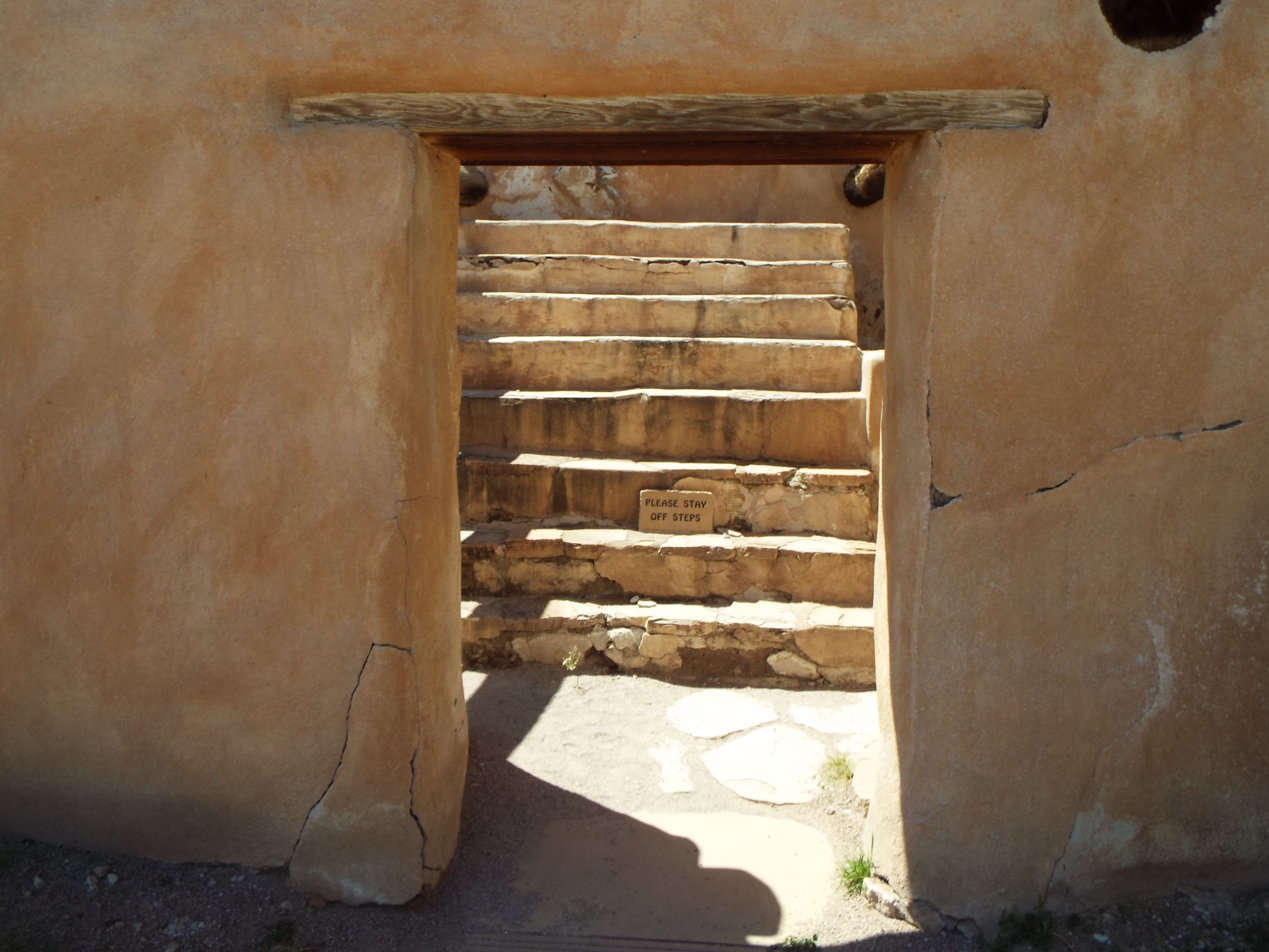
Storage house

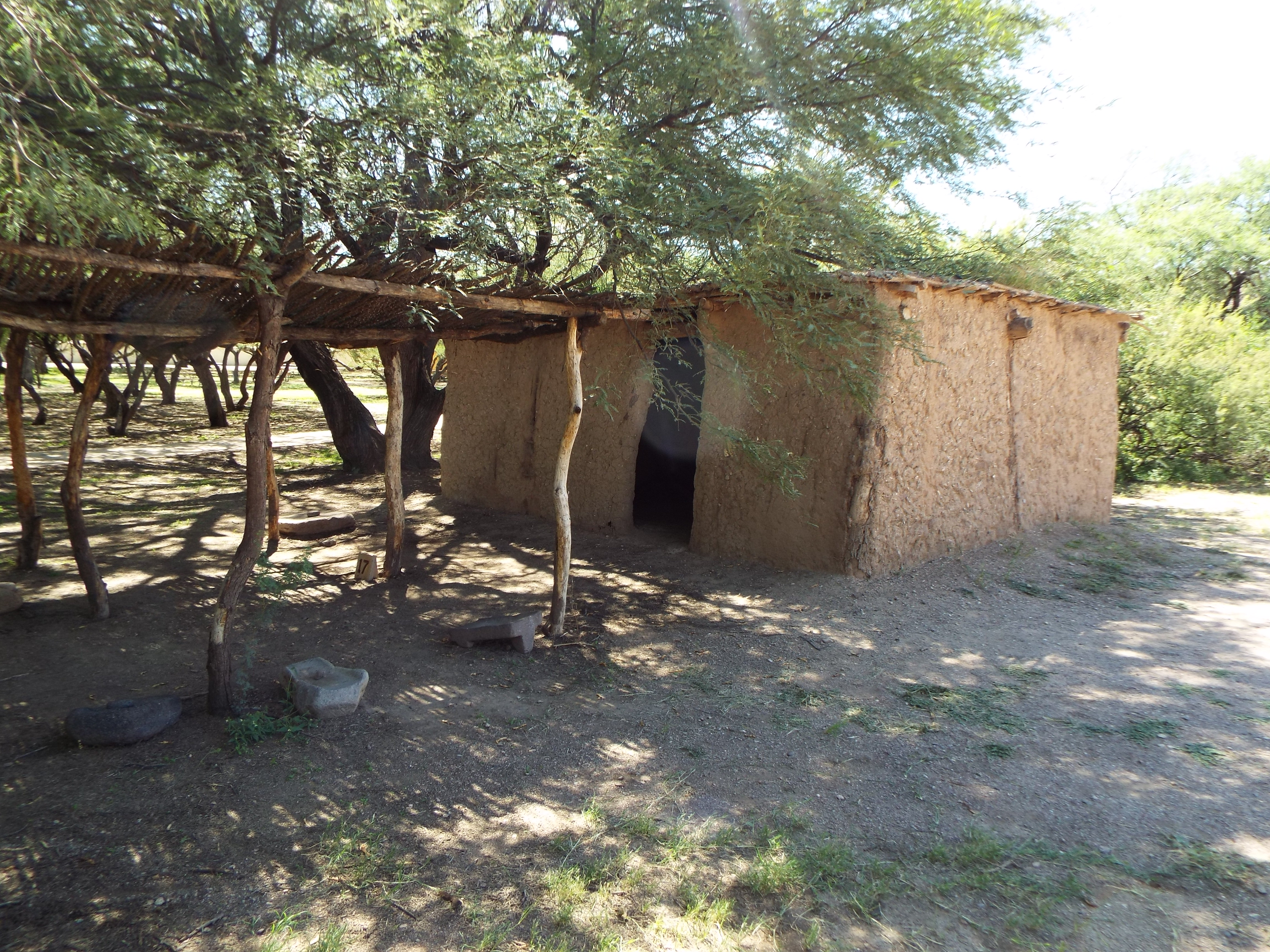
Compuerta

== See also ==
- Spanish missions in Arizona
- Spanish Missions in the Sonoran Desert
- Presidio San Ignacio de Tubac
- List of Jesuit sites
