= 7th California Infantry Regiment =

7th California Volunteer Infantry
- Regimental color of the regiment
- Active: December 1864 to June 28, 1866
- Country: United States
- Allegiance: United States; Union
- Branch: Army
- Type: Infantry
- Size: 1,323 (total enrollment)
- Part of: Department of the Pacific
- Nicknames: "Gold Diggers," "Hungry Seventh"
- Equipment: Springfield Rifle
- Engagements: Skull Valley Incident; Battle of Chiricahua Mountains; Magdalena Affair

Commanders
- Notable commanders: Colonel Charles W. Lewis

The 7th California Infantry Regiment was an infantry regiment in the Union Army during the American Civil War. It spent its entire term of service in the western United States, attached to the Department of the Pacific, serving in California and Arizona Territory. They were unofficially known as the "Gold Diggers" in reference to the large number of recruits from the California's "Mother Lode" region. Later, they were also called the "Hungry Seventh" for the privations they suffered in Arizona, particularly at Fort Mason. They saw combat at the Battle of Chiricahua Mountains, and at Skull Valley. The Regiment included many veterans of the Mexican–American War.

== Regimental Flag ==
While the regiment was being organized and trained at the Presidio of San Francisco, Jonathan D. Stevenson presented them with the regimental flag of the unit he commanded in the Mexican–American War: the 7th New York Volunteers. The regiment continued to carry this flag throughout its service, and it flew over Fort Mason during their time there. The flag was reported to have flown over Colonel Lewis' headquarters when Sonoran Governor Pequeira asked for refuge from pro-Imperialist forces. After the regiment disbanded some of members carried the flag in the 4th of July parade in San Francisco. On that same day the flag was donated Pioneer Society of city. In 1880, the flag was kept in the Pioneers Hall in San Francisco and was displayed on special occasions. It was described as: "...yellow flag and has a brown grizzly in its center."

== Image Gallery ==
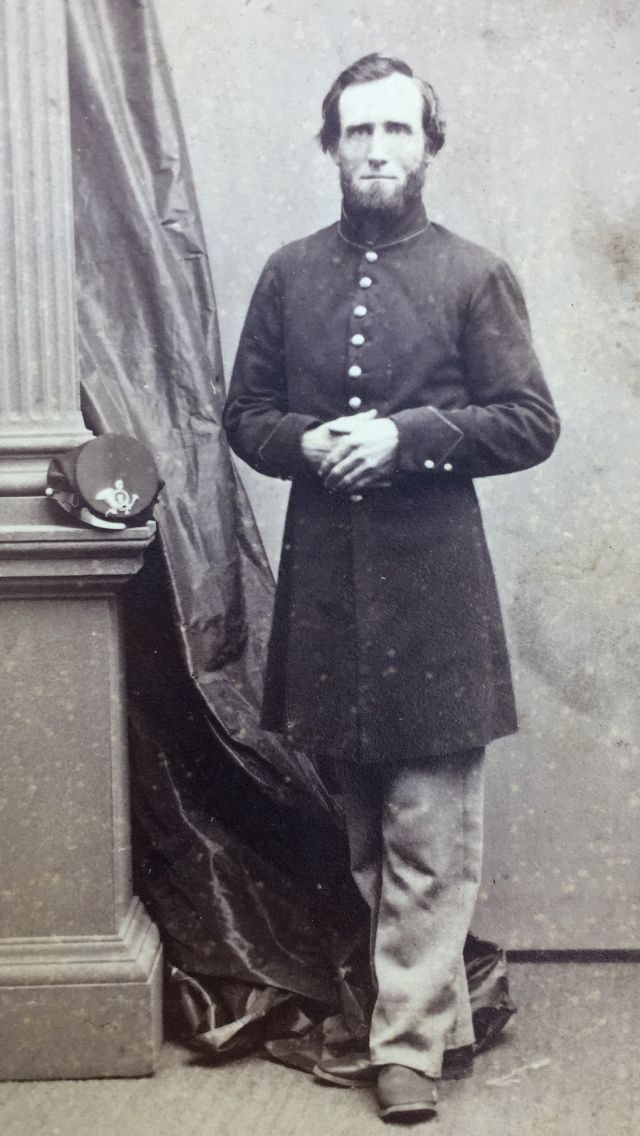
Unknown Private from Company C

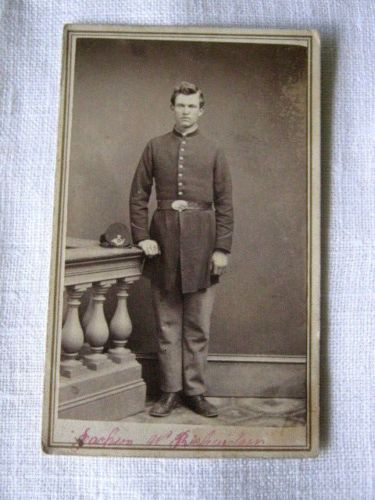
Private Richardson of Company D

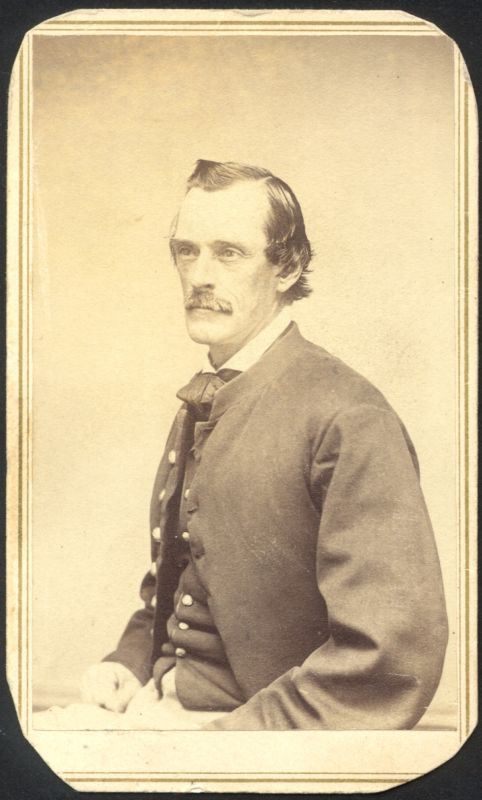
Private Stephan H. Cunningham of Company H

Etching of Private Charles Joseph Mongelaz in 1896 of Company B

== Company assignments ==
- Company A was organized at San Francisco and commanded by Captain James P. Olmstead until his death from brain congestion at Fort Yuma in August, 1865 when command was assumed by Captain James W. Bye. They were assigned to the Presidio of San Francisco in November, 1864, then to Fort Yuma in March, 1865, and finally Fort McDowell, Arizona Territory in September, 1865.
- Company B was organized at Marysville and commanded by Captain Alexander Gibson. They were assigned to the Presidio of San Francisco in November, 1864, then to Tucson in May, 1865.
- Company C was organized at Jackson and commanded by Captain Walter S. Cooledge. They were assigned to the Presidio of San Francisco in November, 1864, then to Fort Mojave in March, 1865.
- Company D was organized at Dutch Flat and commanded by Captain M.H. Calderwood. They were assigned to the Presidio of San Francisco in January, 1865, then to Tubac, Arizona Territory in April, 1865, and Fort Mason, Arizona Territory the following September.
- Company E was organized at San Francisco and commanded by Captain Hiram A. Messenger. They were assigned to the Presidio of San Francisco in November, 1864, then to Tubac, Arizona Territory in April, 1865, and Fort Mason, Arizona Territory the following September.
- Company F was organized at San Francisco and commanded by Captain John W. Owen. They were assigned to the Presidio of San Francisco in December, 1864, then to Fort Yuma in June, 1865, then to Fort McDowell, Arizona Territory and Maricopa Wells in September, 1865.
- Company G was organized at Placerville and commanded by Captain Thomas J. Heninger. They were assigned to the Presidio of San Francisco in October, 1864, then to Tubac, Arizona Territory in May, 1865, and Fort Mason, Arizona Territory the following September.
- Company H was organized at Bear Valley and commanded by Captain James W. Smith. They were assigned to the Presidio of San Francisco in January, 1865, then to Fort Yuma the following May.
- Company I was organized at Sacramento and commanded by Captain George D. Kendall. They were assigned to the Presidio of San Francisco in November, 1864, then to Fort Whipple, Arizona Territory the following May. While marching to the Arizona Territory the company suffered some losses. On June 5, a soldier shot himself in the hand and later died from his wounds, on June 21st one of the men went missing presumed to have been murdered by Natives. Five days later Private Somerindyke accidentally shoots himself in the heart and died. On July 21, 1865 Private John Whittig and another soldier were killed by Native Americans in Skull Valley.
- Company K was organized at San Francisco and commanded by Captain James H. Shepard until his resignation in January, 1866. They were assigned to the Presidio of San Francisco in November, 1864, then to Fort Yuma in March, 1865 then to Fort McDowell, Arizona Territory the following May.

== Service at Tubac and Fort Mason ==
In the Spring of 1865, the Regimental Headquarters and Companies D, E, and G were assigned to Tubac, Arizona Territory. Though they were there primarily to operate against the Apaches, they were also assigned the job of reinforcing the International Line against potential incursions by the forces of the Mexican Empire and its French allies. As part of the ongoing war of the French Intervention, Imperialist forces had made recent advances into the neighboring Mexican State of Sonora, causing considerable alarm among officials in the United States.

In September, the garrison was moved south to Calabazas, a small settlement near the border where they established a post called Post at Calabasas, later renamed Fort Mason. They were joined there by the 1st Battalion of Native Cavalry, California Volunteers. Shortly afterward, Sonora Governor Ignacio Pesqueira, who had fled northward after his army had been destroyed in a series of battles with the Imperialists, arrived at the post with a small party seeking refuge.

Service at Fort Mason was generally considered miserable. Because of its somewhat swampy (by Arizona standards) location on the banks of the Santa Cruz River, the men suffered from an epidemic which at one point rendered over half of them too sick for duty and led to at least 25 deaths. The post suffered from supply problems as well. These conditions caused construction of permanent buildings at the post to slow to a halt, leaving the men to live in tents and temporary brush shelters during their service there and generally curtailing operations against the Apaches. Participation in one campaign against the Apaches, for instance, was aborted by a lack of adequate shoes.

Despite this, the Seventh was, from time to time, able to put small expeditions into the field. On one such occasion, Captain Hiram A. Messenger led a scouting party of 15 men into the Huachuca Mountains in July, 1865. The detachment found itself surrounded and under attack by a reported 100 or 200 Apaches and escaped after a fortuitous rainstorm ended a fight that lasted over an hour and left two soldiers dead and one wounded.

In February of 1866, some troops were headed though Skull Valley with some cattle after reports of Apaches being in the area. They were soon ambushed by a large party of Apaches, during the fighting 2 soldiers were killed and 1 was wounded. While the Apaches lost 1 with them being unable to captured any the cattle, they soon left the area.

The regiment was ordered back to The Presidio in March, 1866 and was mustered out during April and May.

== See also ==
- List of California Civil War Union units
