= Larcena Pennington Page =

American pioneer (1837–1913)

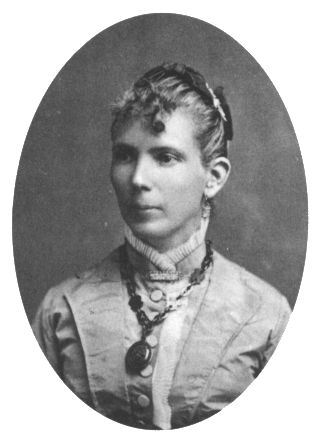
- Born: Larcena Ann Pennington; January 10, 1837; Nashville, Tennessee
- Died: March 31, 1913 (aged 76); Tucson, Arizona
- Occupation: President of the Arizona Historical Society
- Known for: survived Apache attack and crawled 16 days to help
- Spouses: John Hempstead Page; William Fisher Scott
- Children: Mary Ann Page; William P. Scott; Georgie Hazel Scott

Larcena Pennington Page (January 10, 1837 – March 31, 1913), born Larcena Ann Pennington, was an American pioneer known for surviving a kidnapping by Apache as a young married woman of 23 years old in present-day Arizona. Left for dead and unable to stand, she crawled 15 miles (24 km) over the next sixteen days to reach safety.

After her kidnapping, Larcena was indirectly involved in several other incidents with Apache. Much of her family died during her life as a result of native attacks or from infectious disease on the frontier.

== Early life ==
Born Larcena Ann Pennington, in Nashville, Tennessee, she was the daughter of Elias and Julia Ann Pennington. One of 12 children, she had seven sisters and four brothers. Her father, Elias, was the son of Elijah Pennington, a soldier who served under General George Washington at Valley Forge during the American Revolutionary War. Her mother Julia Ann Pennington died within a year after the birth of her twelfth child while her husband was away. After that, the father took the surviving Penningtons to an area near Keechi, Texas.

=== Leaves Texas ===
In 1857, in hopes of economic prosperity, the Pennington family traveled west, originally with the intention of settling in California. From Keechi they headed west with three wagons pulled by oxen and mules, and a herd of cattle. The wagon train forded the Pecos River, where several of the cows drowned; it continued to Paso del Norte. From there they followed the Rio Grande north to Mesilla and then moved west toward Tucson. They passed through several canyons where Apache were known to spring surprise attacks, including Doubtful Canyon, Apache Pass, and Cooke's Canyon. (A wagon train was later attacked there in the Battle of Cookes Canyon in 1861.) They passed through the San Simon Valley, Sulphur Springs Valley, the San Pedro and Dragoon Springs on their way west.

In June 1857, the Penningtons temporarily stopped at Sonoita Creek, next to Fort Buchanan, because their animals were either exhausted, or had been stolen by Apache, and Larcena had contracted malaria. The men obtained a contract from the government to supply the fort with hay and the women sewed soldiers' uniforms for pay. When they completed the contract, the Penningtons moved west to Calabasas, along the Santa Cruz River. Before September 1859 they moved into the former residence of Governor Manuel Maria Gandara, who was displaced after the United States victory in the Mexican–American War.

=== Marriage and family ===
While at Fort Buchanan, Larcena met lumberjack John Hempstead Page and fell in love. The two married on December 24, 1859, becoming the first American citizens to be wed in Tucson. At that time, the settlement had fewer than one thousand people.

== Kidnapping ==
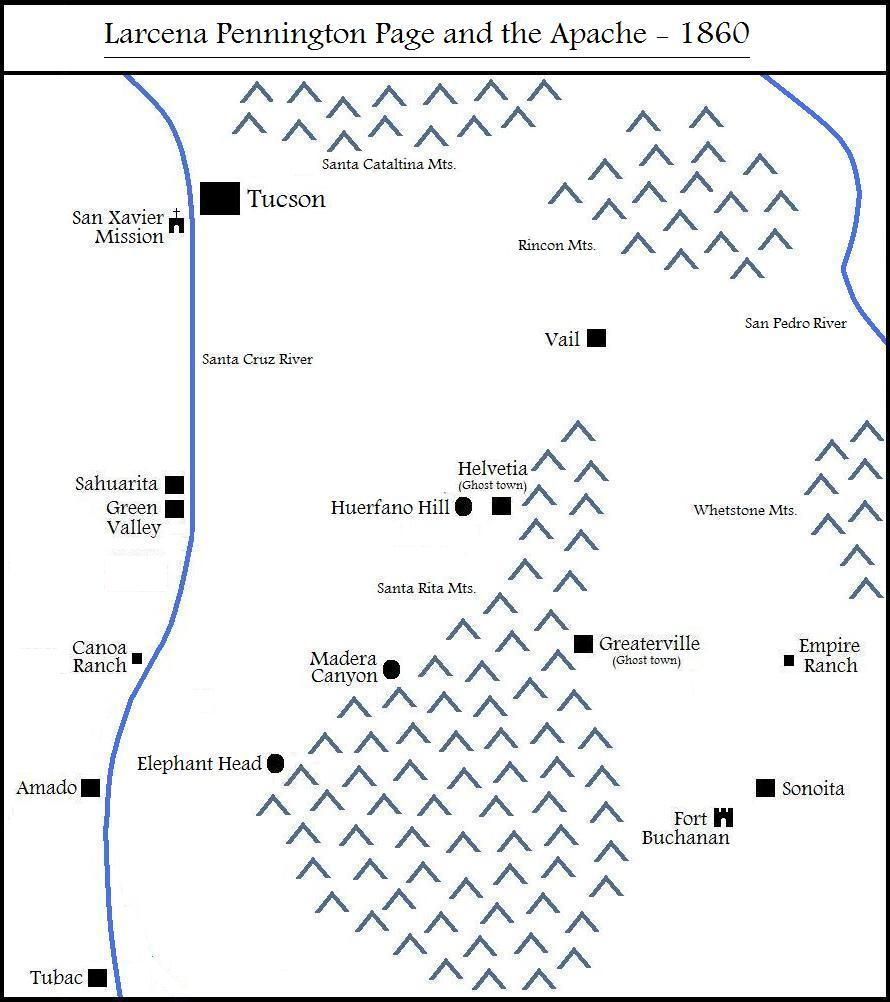

After they married, Larcena moved from the fort to Tucson, but her husband lived and worked at Canoa Ranch, south of present-day Green Valley. Canoa Ranch was owned by Bill Kirkland. Page lived there because it was only 13 miles (21 km) east of Madera Canyon and the Santa Rita Mountains, where he and his partner, William Randall, had a small lumber mill at the canyon. There they processed pine trees to transport to Tucson by wagon for sale.

Larcena was employed as a teacher for Kirkland's eleven-year-old ward, Mercedes Sais Quiroz. Eventually Larcena moved to Canoa Ranch with Mercedes, but she became ill, possibly with malaria. Page decided to move his wife and Mercedes out of the desert and into a cabin near the "Big Rock" at the lumber mill. He thought that the higher elevation would help Larcena recover. On March 15, 1860, Page and Randall picked up Larcena, Mercedes and their dog for the trip to the cabin by wagon. They headed west through the Santa Rita foothills toward Madera Canyon.

They had nearly reached their destination when they decided to stop and rest for the night. This site was 2 miles (3.2 km) south of the "Big Rock". They did not know that five Pinal Apache warriors were watching the camp from the surrounding hills. The next morning, Randall went out to hunt for breakfast and, at around 10:00 am, Page rode up the canyon to check on a load of lumber at the mill, leaving Larcena and Mercedes alone at camp. Larcena was alarmed by the dog barking and hearing Mercedes scream. The Apache first captured Mercedes and next entered Larcena's tent, removing her husband's revolver from her before she could shoot.

The Apache were armed with lances and bows. Four were young men but the fifth was older and spoke a little Spanish. The older Apache told Mercedes that he had killed Page; and Larcena screamed after the girl told her. One of the Apache put his lance to Larcena and threatened to kill her if she didn't stop. After stealing "whatever they could" and cutting open the Pages' sacks of food, the Apache took the two women northeast, who walked roughly along the base of the Santa Rita Mountains, toward one of their strongholds along the San Pedro River.

They stopped a short distance from the camp to take apart a feather bed they had been trying to carry off. Larcena screamed and again was told to be quiet or be killed. Robert H. Forbes, author of Penningtons: Pioneers of Early Arizona, wrote that up to that time, neither of the captives had been molested in any way, but Larcena later said that the Apache "pre-tended to ambush them from behind trees or play-fully pointed the captured pistol at them." One of the Apache recounted that all the land in that area was once part of their domain until the white man came. The journey to the San Pedro was rough, but both Larcena and Mercedes tore off pieces of their clothing and bent twigs to make an easily recognizable trail. Forbes says, "One of the Apaches melted snow in his hands for them [the captives] to drink. Mrs. Page was pushed or pulled up steep places in the trail and Mercedes was carried pick-a-back. Their hats were restored to them from the plunder and fair progress was made...."

=== Left for dead ===
Page had not been killed and returned to camp to discover both his wife and Mercedes missing. He assumed they had been taken by Apache and gathered Randall and a few other men from the mill to help follow their trail. Just before sunset, when the Apache and women captives were about 15 miles (24 km) from the camp, east of the present day Helvetia, one of the Apache noticed Page's party approaching from behind. The Apache quickened their pace but Larcena could not keep up. While the group was standing atop a ridge, the Apache made Larcena remove her skirt and corset. As she turned to continue walking, one of the natives struck her in the back with a lance. She fell over the side of the ridge, about seventeen feet, becoming lodged against a pine tree. The Apache followed Larcena down the ridge, thrusting their spears into her and throwing rocks at her. One of the rocks hit Larcena in the face and she fell unconscious.

The Apache dragged her body into a snow bank behind a tree to hide her body from the trail. They removed her boots and one of them put them on. Larcena woke up a short time later and could hear her husband's voice coming from the trail. She tried to call, but was too weak for him to hear her. Because one of the Apache was wearing Larcena's boots, Page followed his trail and passed unknowing by his wife. He trailed the Apache to the Rincon Mountains and beyond the Catalina Mountains. Still unable to find his wife, Page went to Tucson and recruited a posse for a second attempt. Another posse also formed in Tubac but it was also unsuccessful.

=== Journey back ===
Larcena remained in the snow bank for about three days before waking up in the middle of the night. First she ate some snow and looked after her wounds, for she had been "bruised with stones and cut with sixteen lance wounds in her back and arms." She made her way down the ridge, sleeping again until sunrise. On the next morning, she began looking around trying to understand where she was. Knowing that the camp and the lumber mill were to the southeast, she looked in that direction and sighted a "small sharp-pointed hill." Historians have identified this from her account as Huerfano Hill, about 3 miles (4.8 km) west of Helvetia. Because of her wounds and loss of blood, for the next several days Larcena crawled the 15 miles (24 km) back to camp. She survived on "seeds, herbage and wild onions, with snow water to drink."

According to Forbes, "Night by night (unable to lie on her back because of her wounds) she crouched upon her knees and arms on the ground and dreamed of food; but when in her sleep she reached out for the pot of beans before her, she awoke to find her hands clutching only gravel." One day, Larcena came across a bear's nest and wanted to sleep there but she knew it was a bad idea and went away. Ten days after her "terrible journey" began, on March 26, she climbed to the top of a ridge and saw the road that leads to Madera Canyon and the camp. Hearing the sound of voices and wagon wheels, Larcena attached her petticoat to a stick to signal for help. She also screamed but the people in the wagon passed on without seeing or hearing anything. When Larcena reached the camp, two days later, she found a smoldering campfire, some flour and some coffee that was still on the ground from when the Apaches cut open the sacks of food. Using water from a nearby stream, and a piece of her clothing, Larcena prepared some bread on the fire, made some coffee, and then rested for the night.

On the next morning, March 31, Larcena followed the road east to the Big Rock and the lumber mill. Forbes says that "as she drew near she was seen, but not at first recognized. With clotted hair and gaping wounds, nearly naked, emaciated and sunburned, she was at first mistaken for an unfortunate outcast squaw and the men ran for their guns." It was only when Larcena called out her name that she was recognized. But even then, one man, named Smith, insisted that she was a ghost because he couldn't believe that a twenty-three-year-old woman could survive so long under such trying circumstances. One of the men took Larcena into a building and had her fed and washed while another man went to get a doctor in Tucson and inform John, who was preparing for a third expedition to find his wife. On April 2, Larcena was taken to Tucson where she fully recovered under the care of Dr. C.B. Hughes. The young Mexican girl, Mercedes, was later found by the United States Army and traded for Apache prisoners at Fort Buchanan. She later married Charles A. Shibell and had four children, but died at age 26.

== Later life ==
In 1861 the American Civil War was about to begin and Larcena was worried that the Apaches would turn more violent with the absence of military personnel. Larcena and her family soon moved to Patagonia. Due to the Bascom Affair, Chief Cochise and Mangas Coloradas were attacking American settlements all across southern New Mexico Territory. In March or April 1861, her husband, John, was ambushed and killed by Apache north of Tucson while transporting a wagon load of goods to Old Camp Grant. John was buried where he died, "at the top of the hill beyond Samaniego's ranch, on the old road; and all that Mrs. Page ever saw of him was his handkerchief, his purse and a lock of his hair." In the later part of August 1861, her brother, Jack, saved a fellow settler from Apaches during the Battle of Cookes Canyon.

In September 1861, Larcena gave birth to her daughter, Mary Ann, and shortly thereafter she moved again, to Tubac and later to a stone house along the Santa Cruz, about a half-mile from the international border with Mexico. The stone house was located in a dangerous area, frequented by Apaches, and at one point Larcena had to flee to Mowry, a small, fortified, mining town. Constantly moving, by April 1864 the Penningtons had returned to Tubac and were its only residents, as everyone else had fled during the Apache attack in 1861. Larcena's young brothers carried very long guns, to protect the family from further attacks.

In 1867 Larcena's sister died of malaria and in 1868 her brother, Jim Pennington, was killed during attacks against the Apache. In June 1869, her father and another brother were both murdered while working at a farm by Apaches. The remaining members of the Pennington family left for Tucson and then decided to move to California. About 20 miles (32 km) outside Tucson, they had to return when Larcena's sister Ellen became gravely ill with pneumonia. Despite seeking medical help, Ellen died. Larcena and her brother were the only two remaining family members. Jack moved to Texas and Larcena decided to remain in Tucson.

=== Marries again ===
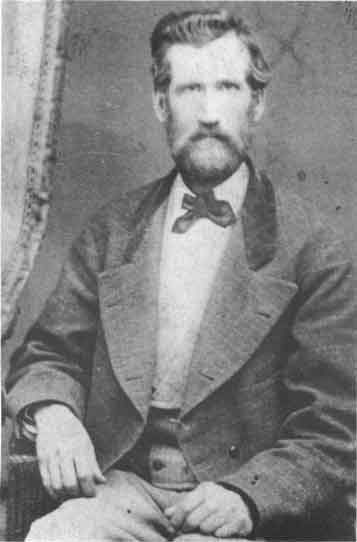
William Fisher Scott, second husband of Larcena Pennington Page.

In August 1870, she married William Fisher Scott, a Scottish lawyer and judge. Larcena and William had two children, William P. (born September 1871) and Georgie Hazel (born October 6, 1872). Larcena refused to leave Arizona, despite all the hardships she went through there. Larcena became a Christian and was one of the first members of the Congregational Church in Tucson. She was also named president of the Arizona Historical Society. Larcena lived a relatively quiet life from then until her death.

== Legacy ==
Pennington Street in downtown Tucson is named after Larcena Pennington and her family. Scott Avenue is named for her second husband William F. Scott. In the early 2000s, a residential community named Stone House was built southeast of Sahuarita, Arizona. It was named after the Penningtons' stone house along the Santa Cruz River.

== Bibliography ==
- Banks, Leo (1999). Stalwart Women: Frontier Stories of Indomitable Spirit. Arizona Highways. ISBN 0-916179-77-X.
