= Camp Cameron, Arizona Territory =

1866–67 US Army camp in the Arizona Territory

Coordinates: 31°43′33″N 110°52′49″W

Camp Cameron was a temporary U. S. Army camp located in Madera Canyon in Arizona Territory between 1866 and 1867.

Camp Cameron was established there at the base of the Santa Rita Mountains, after an epidemic of malaria forced the abandonment of Camp Mason. Camp Cameron was about 16 miles northeast of Fort Mason and existed from October 1, 1866, to March 7, 1867.
