= Tumacácori National Historical Park =

National Historical Park in Santa Cruz County, Arizona

- IUCN category III (natural monument or feature)
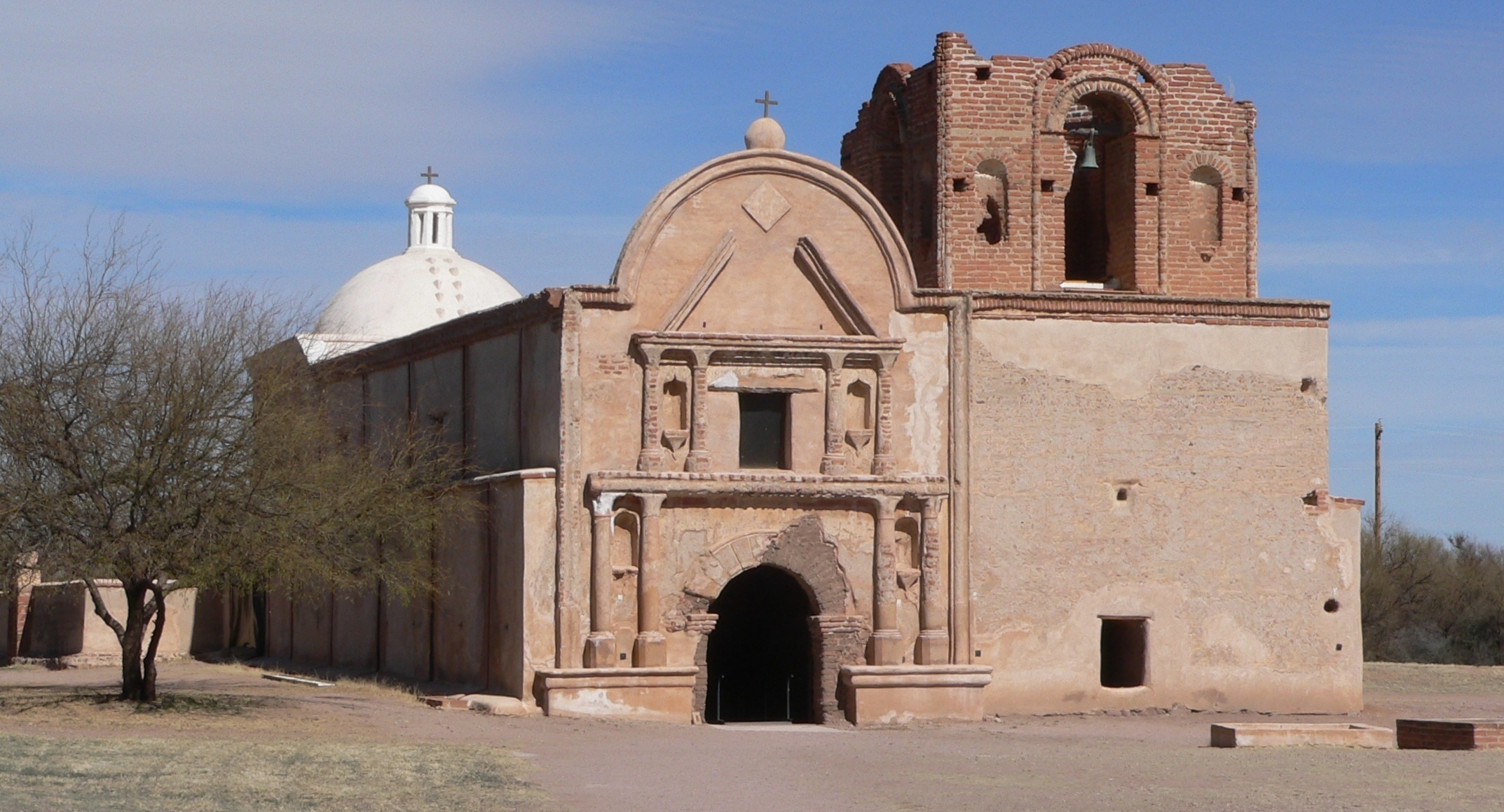
- Mission San José de Tumacácori

- Location within Arizona Location within the United States
- Location: Santa Cruz County, Arizona, United States
- Nearest city: Nogales, Arizona
- Coordinates: 31.5681465°N 111.0506458°W
- Area: 360 acres (150 ha)
- Established: August 6, 1990
- Visitors: 28,449 (in 2025)
- Governing body: National Park Service
- Website: Tumacácori National Historical Park

Tumacácori National Historical Park is located in the upper Santa Cruz River Valley in Santa Cruz County, southern Arizona. The park consists of 360 acres (1.5 km^{2}) in three separate units. The park protects the ruins of three Spanish mission communities, two of which are National Historic Landmark sites. It also contains the landmark 1937 Tumacácori Museum building, also a National Historic Landmark.

== History ==
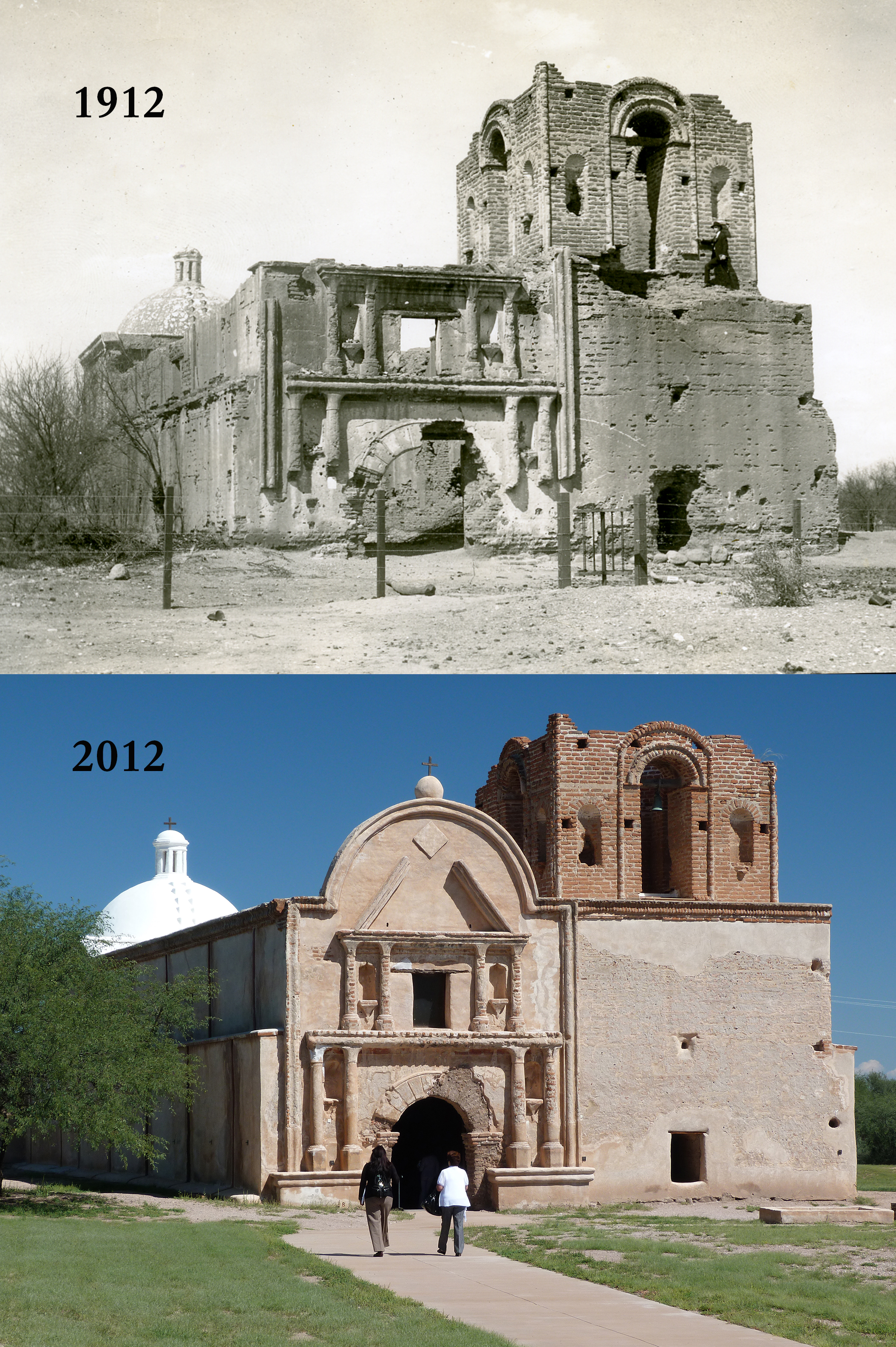
Restoration efforts have brought buildings closer to their original appearance

The first Spanish Colonial Jesuit missions in the locale were established in 1691 by Padre Eusebio Kino. Mission San Cayetano de Tumacácori (at Tumacácori) and Mission Los Santos Ángeles de Guevavi, are the two oldest missions in southern Arizona. The Franciscan church of Mission San José de Tumacácori, across the river from and replacing Mission San Cayetano de Tumacácori, was built in the 1750s. The third mission was established in 1756, Mission San Cayetano de Calabazas.

The Mission San José de Tumacácori complex is open to the public. Nearby are the park's visitor center and the Tumacácori Museum in a historic Mission Revival style building. The Guevavi and Calabazas missions are not open to the general public, but can be visited on reserved tours led by park staff.

The Tumacácori missions complex was originally protected as Tumacácori National Monument, in 1908 by President Theodore Roosevelt. It was listed on the National Register of Historic Places on October 15, 1966. In 1990 the national monument was redesignated a National Historical Park. The Guevavi and Calabazas mission units were added to the Tumacácori missions complex unit, within the new Tumacácori National Historical Park.

The site was on the route of the 1775–1776 Juan Bautista de Anza Expedition from New Spain to Alta California, the first Spanish overland expedition to claimed but un-colonized upper Las Californias territory. A 4.5 miles (7.2 km) segment of the Juan Bautista de Anza National Historic Trail lies along the Santa Cruz River between Tumacácori National Historical Park and Tubac Presidio State Historic Park.

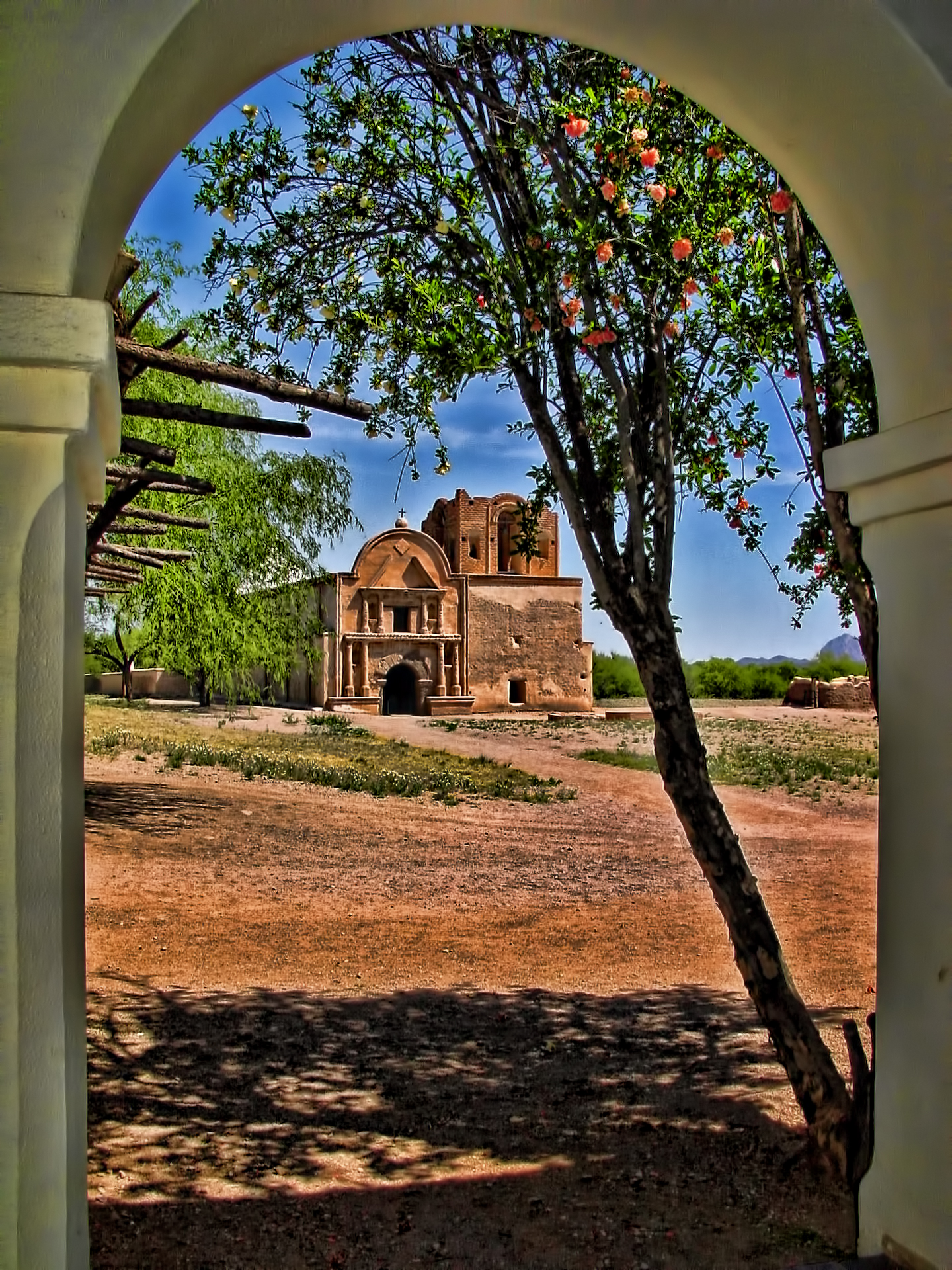
Mission San José de Tumacácori.

== Mission San José de Tumacácori ==
Mission San José de Tumacácori was established in 1691 by Jesuit padre Eusebio Kino in a different nearby location. It was established one day before Mission Los Santos Ángeles de Guevavi, making it the oldest Jesuit mission site in southern Arizona. The first mission was named Mission San Cayetano de Tumacácori, established at an existing native O'odham or Sobaipuri settlement on the east side of the Santa Cruz River.

After the Pima rebellion of 1751, the mission was moved to the present site on the west side of the Santa Cruz River and renamed San José de Tumacácori. By 1848, the mission was abandoned and began falling into severe disrepair. In 1854 it became a part of the U.S. Arizona Territory, after the Gadsden Purchase.

Restoration and stabilization efforts began in 1908 when the site was declared Tumacácori National Monument by President Theodore Roosevelt. In 1990 it became part of the new Tumacácori National Historical Park.

== Tumacácori Museum ==
- Tumacácori Museum
- U.S. National Register of Historic Places
- U.S. National Historic Landmark
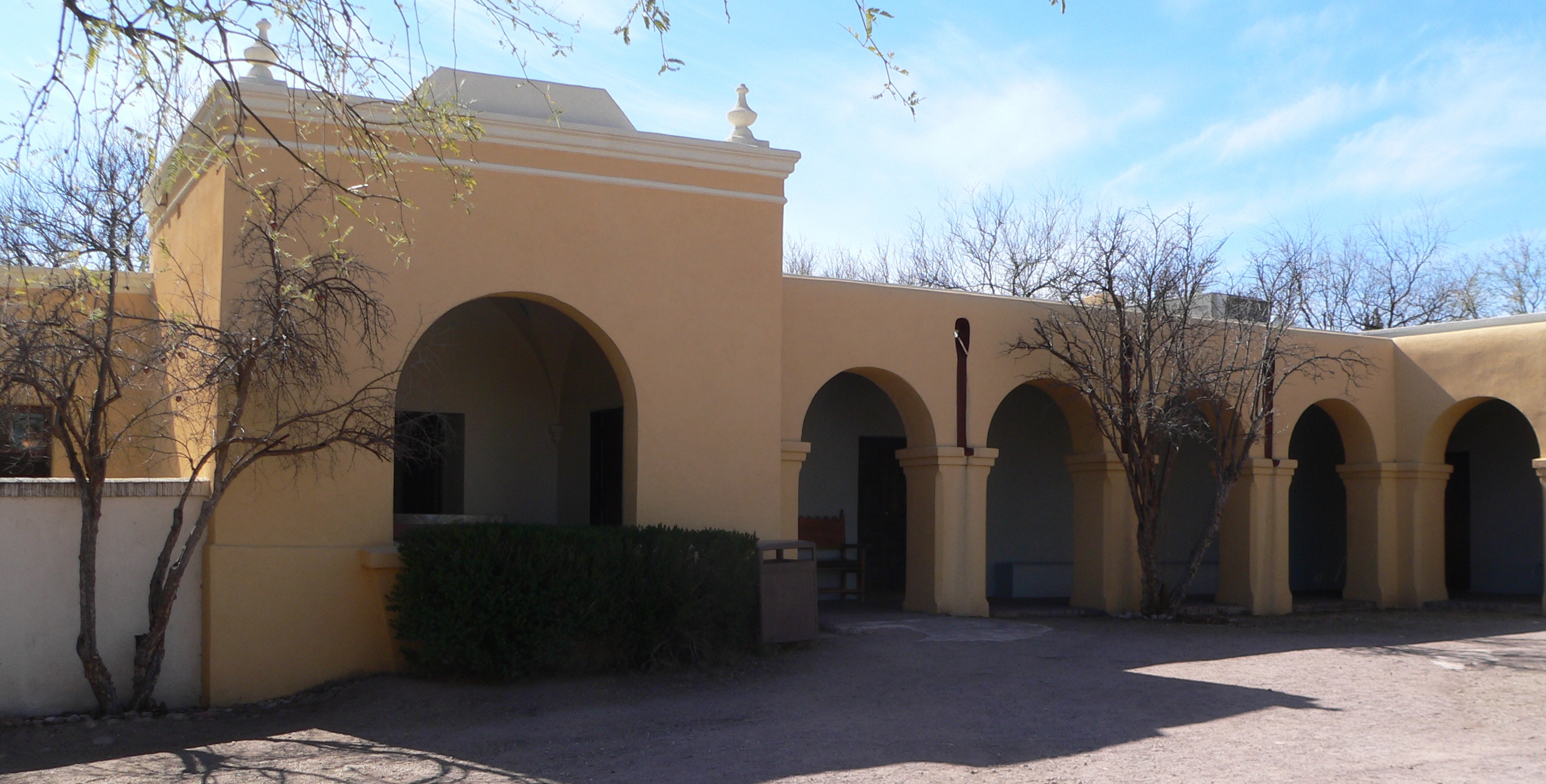
- Tumacácori Museum building
- Location: Tumacácori National Monument (Tumacácori National Historical Park), Tumacacori, Arizona
- Built: 1937
- Architect: Scofield DeLong, et al
- Architectural style: Mission Revival style architecture, with Spanish Colonial Revival
- NRHP reference No.: 87001437

Significant dates
- Added to NRHP: May 28, 1987
- Designated NHL: May 28, 1987

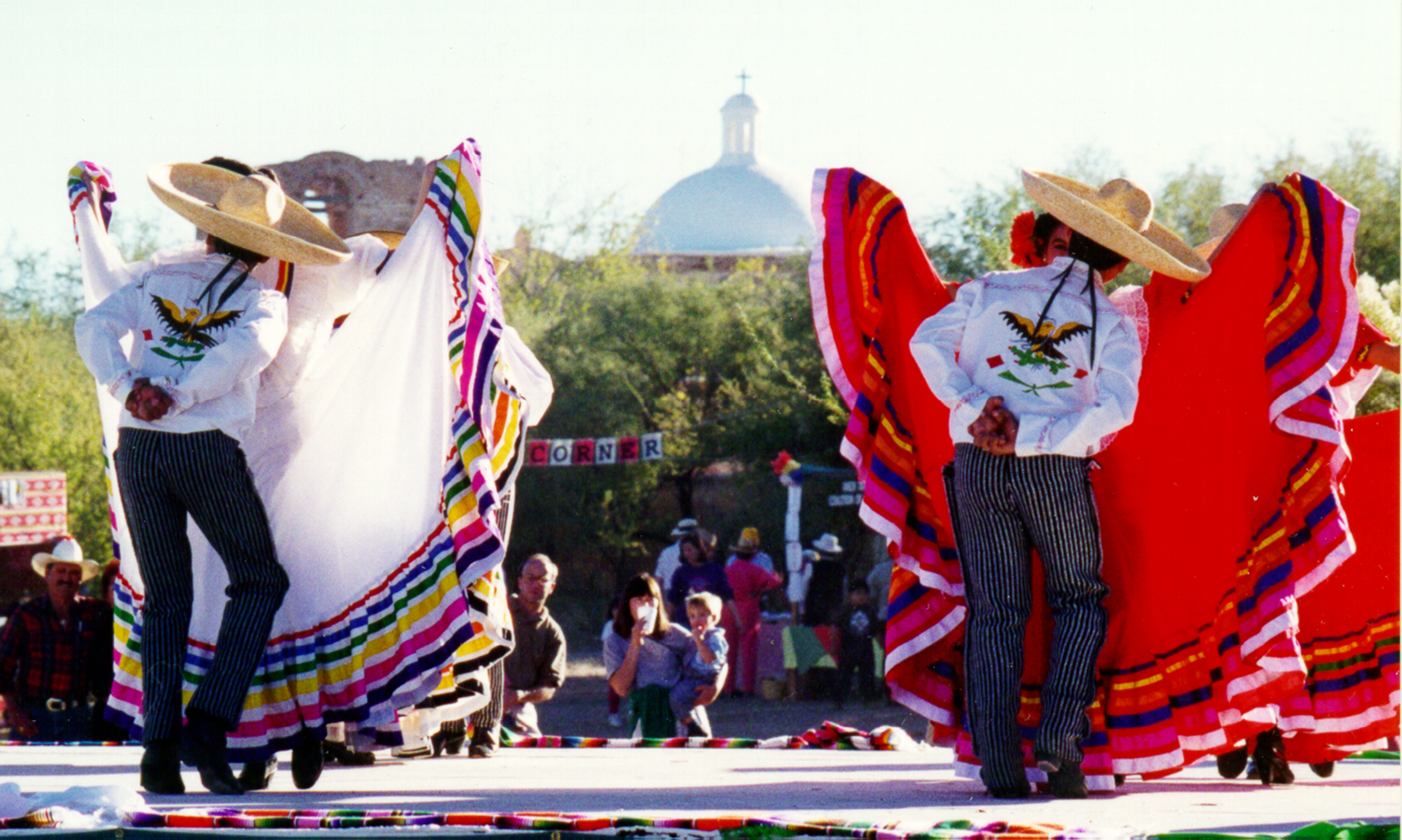
Folklórico dancers performing at Tumacácori's annual Fiesta

Tumacácori Museum was built in 1937 within what was then Tumacácori National Monument and is now Tumacácori National Historical Park. Designed by Scofield Delong, it contains interpretative displays relating to three historic missions preserved within the park, and includes artwork created by artist Herbert A. Collins.

The museum building, a fine example of Mission Revival style architecture, with Spanish Colonial Revival details, was declared a National Historic Landmark in 1987.

== Cinema ==
Movies with scenes filmed in the park include:

- Duel in the Sun directed by King Vidor (1946)
- Young Guns II directed by Geoff Murphy (1990)
- Boys on the Side directed by Herbert Ross (1995)

== See also ==
- Spanish missions in Arizona
- Spanish missions in the Sonoran Desert
- Hispanic Heritage Site
