= Dichomeris gausapa =

Scientific classification
- Kingdom: Animalia
- Phylum: Arthropoda
- Clade: Pancrustacea
- Class: Insecta
- Order: Lepidoptera
- Family: Gelechiidae
- Genus: Dichomeris
- Species: D. gausapa

Binomial name
- Dichomeris gausapa Hodges, 1986

Species of moth

Dichomeris gausapa is a moth in the family Gelechiidae. It was described by Ronald W. Hodges in 1986. It is found in North America, where it has been recorded from Madera Canyon in the Santa Rita Mountains of Arizona.
