= Dichomeris alphito =

Scientific classification
- Kingdom: Animalia
- Phylum: Arthropoda
- Clade: Pancrustacea
- Class: Insecta
- Order: Lepidoptera
- Family: Gelechiidae
- Genus: Dichomeris
- Species: D. alphito

Binomial name
- Dichomeris alphito Hodges, 1986

Species of moth

Dichomeris alphito is a moth in the family Gelechiidae. It was described by Ronald W. Hodges in 1986. It is found in North America, where it has been recorded from the Santa Rita Mountains in Arizona and California.
