= Continental, Arizona =

- Populated place
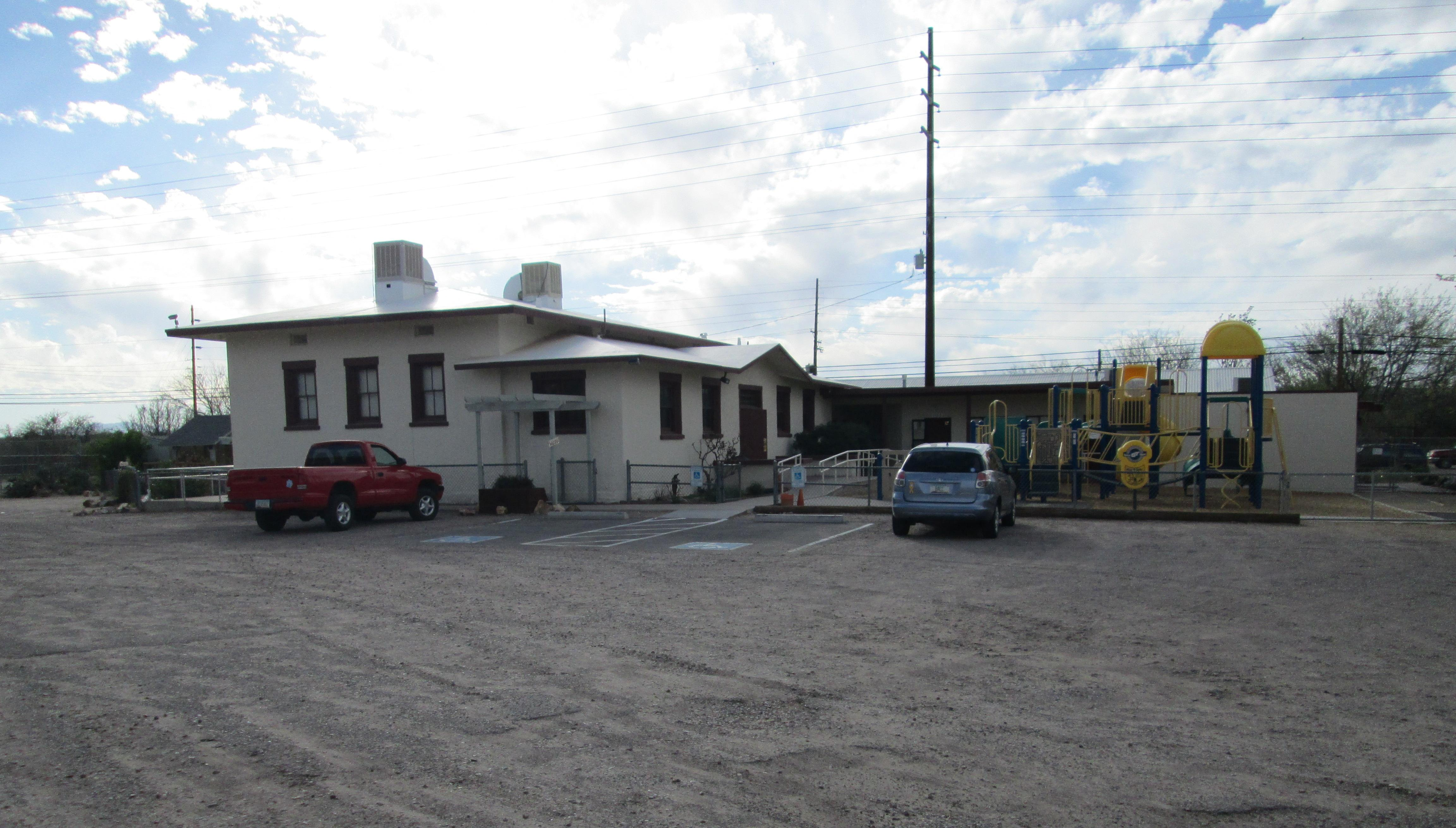
- The Continental Community Center in 2014

- Location within Arizona
- Coordinates: 31°51′03″N 110°58′29″W
- Country: United States
- State: Arizona
- County: Pima
- Elevation: 2,864 ft (873 m)
- Time zone: Mountain (MST)
- Area code: 520
- Post Office opened: May 26, 1917
- Post Office closed: February 28, 1929

Continental is a populated place located about 25 mi (40 km) south of Tucson, in Pima County, Arizona, United States, near the town of Sahuarita and the retirement community of Green Valley. Once a center for cotton production, Continental is now nearly surrounded by large pecan orchards and Green Valley subdivisions. It is also the closest town to Madera Canyon, a premier birdwatching area and tourist attraction located in the Santa Rita Mountains.

== History ==
Continental was founded during World War I in 1916, after President Woodrow Wilson asked the Intercontinental Rubber Company of Bernard Baruch, Joseph Kennedy, and J. P. Morgan to grow guayule. Guayule is a plant that produces latex and can be used to make rubber if, as many Americans feared, the German navy were to cut off shipping lanes and imports of rubber from the Far East.

In 1916, Intercontinental established the Continental Farm seven miles south of Sahuarita and immediately east of the present-day Green Valley, along the eastern banks of the Santa Cruz River and the Southern Pacific Railroad. Over the next few years, a small town was built to accommodate the workers at the farm. In addition to several large adobe homes that were built for the farmers around 1918, and the fields and the processing facility built for the guayule, the town of Continental had a post office that opened in 1917, a schoolhouse that was built in 1918, a church, a general store, and its own cemetery. The guayule project was abandoned after the end of World War I. In 1922, Queen Wilhelmina of the Netherlands bought the farm and rented the fields to cotton farmers until 1949.

In 1926, an Arkansas farmer named James B. Bull acquired a 160-acre plot in between Continental and Sahuraita. Naming it the Bull Farms, James raised alfalfa, vegetables, and grains until 1975. At its peak, Bull Farms was one of the largest in the area with its 6,150 acres. In 1939, the Bull Farms was used in the filming of The Westerner, starring Gary Cooper. During World War II, in late 1944, the United States Army established a prisoner of war camp for German POWs next to the farm. Camp Continental, as it was called, was built to house 250 inmates and forty guards. Because of a labor shortage caused by the war, the prisoners were put to work in the nearby fields. Although very little is known about the history of the camp, on more than one occasion the American guards had to use billy clubs to "quell disorderly prisoners as they were prone to pro-Nazi uprisings." Nothing remains of the camp and in 1989 the site of the Bull Farms became the present-day Quail Creek retirement development center.

In 1948, R. Keith Walden relocated his Farmers Investment Company (FICO) from California to Arizona and purchased the Continental Farm to use as his headquarters. In the 1950s, Keith grew concerned that competition from synthetic fibers would threaten the cotton market and in 1965 he transitioned his farming operation to pecans as an alternative crop. Keith chose pecans because of their compatibility with the climate of the Sonoran Desert. FICO is still owned by the Walden family and their orchards combine to form the largest pecan grove in the world.

Today, several of the old adobe homes in Continental are still in use. The old Continental School was replaced in the 1990s by a new facility located about one mile to the east. The old school was refurbished and now serves as the Continental Community Center. The Continental Cemetery is located northeast of the old school, and is now completely surrounded by the Madera Reserve subdivision. Considered to be a holy site by local Indians, the cemetery has been in use since 1903, and the oldest marked grave is from 1918.

== Gallery ==
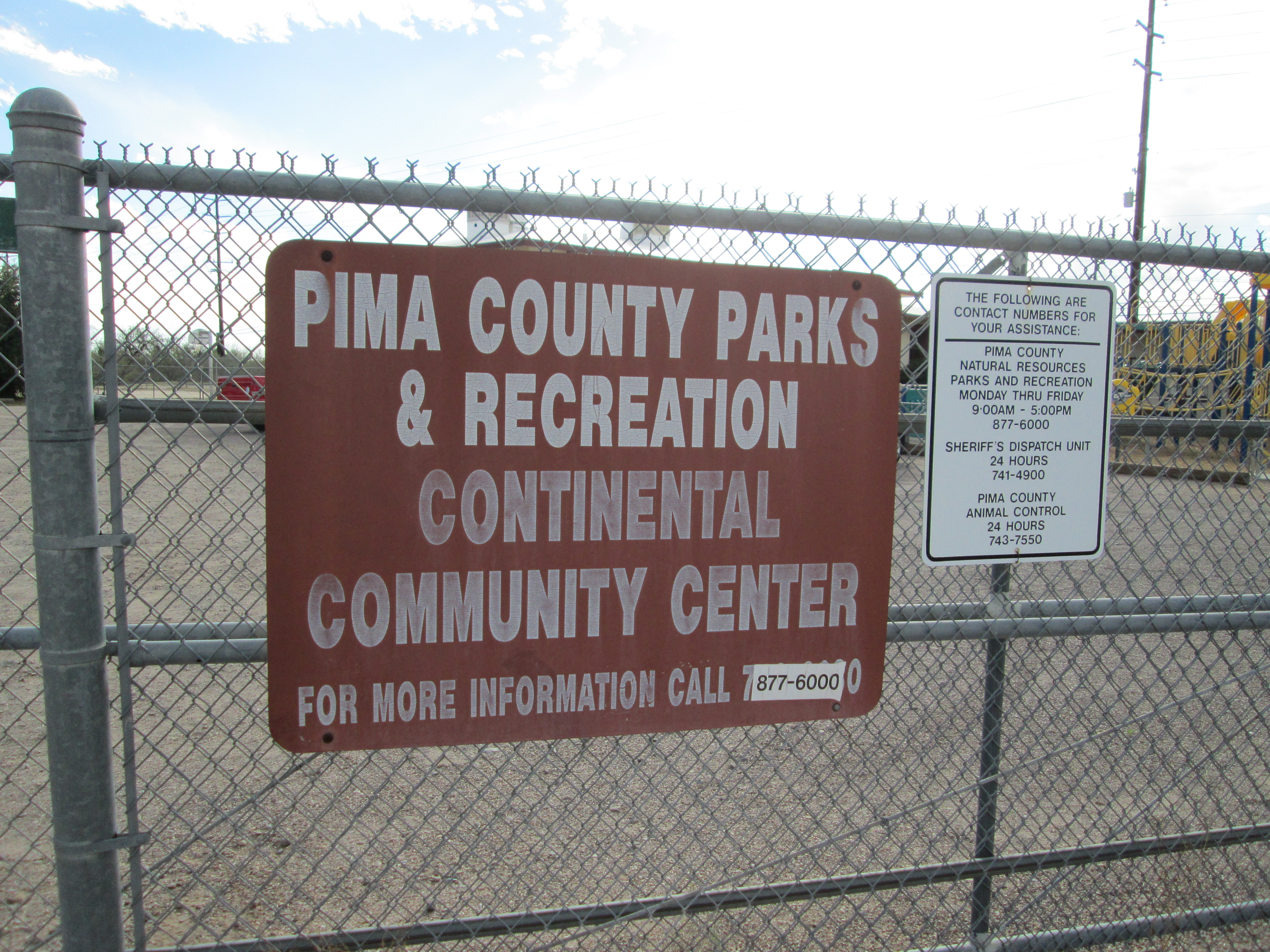
Signs in front of the Continental Community Center

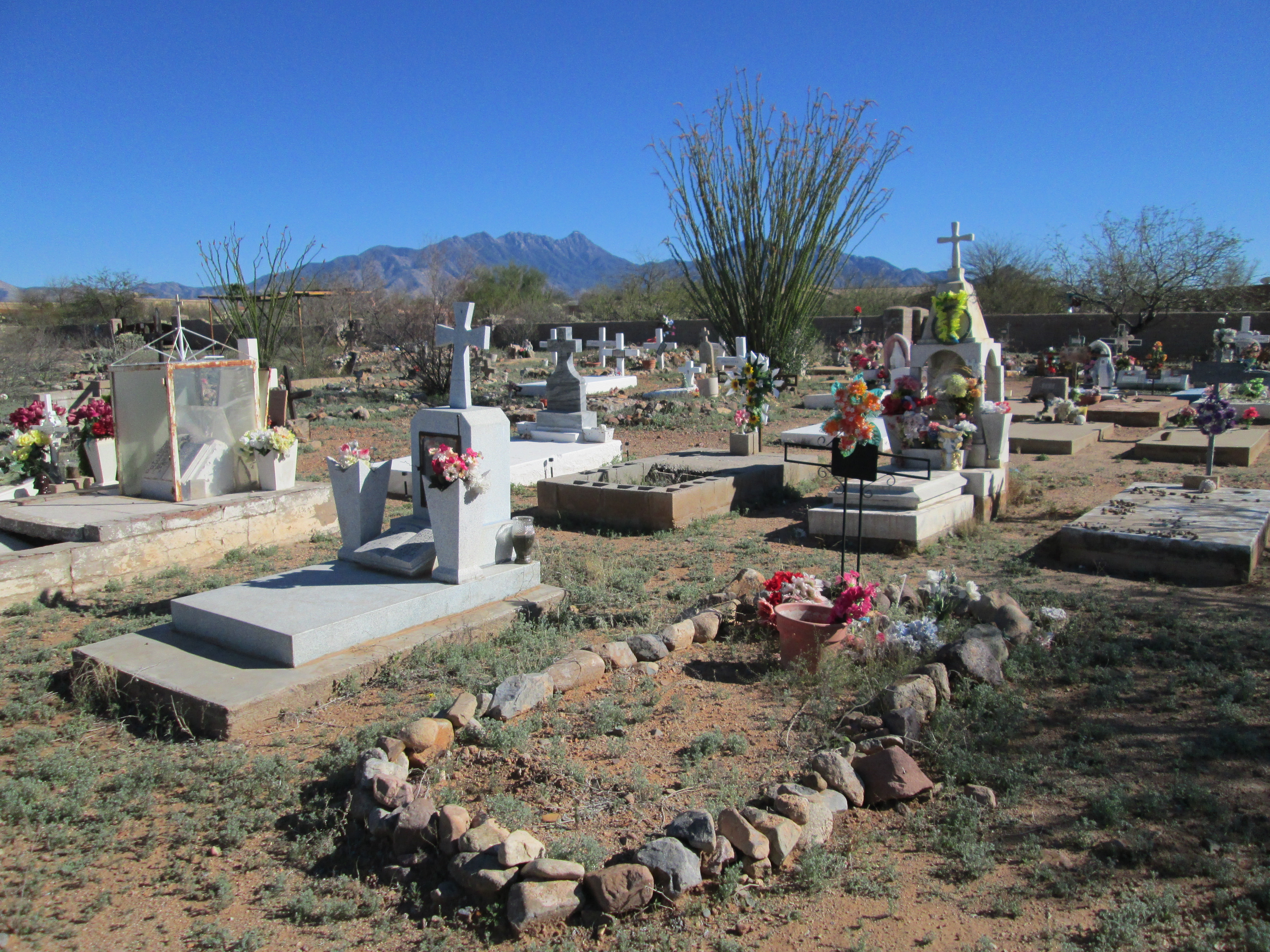
Graves at the Continental Cemetery with the Santa Rita Mountains in the background

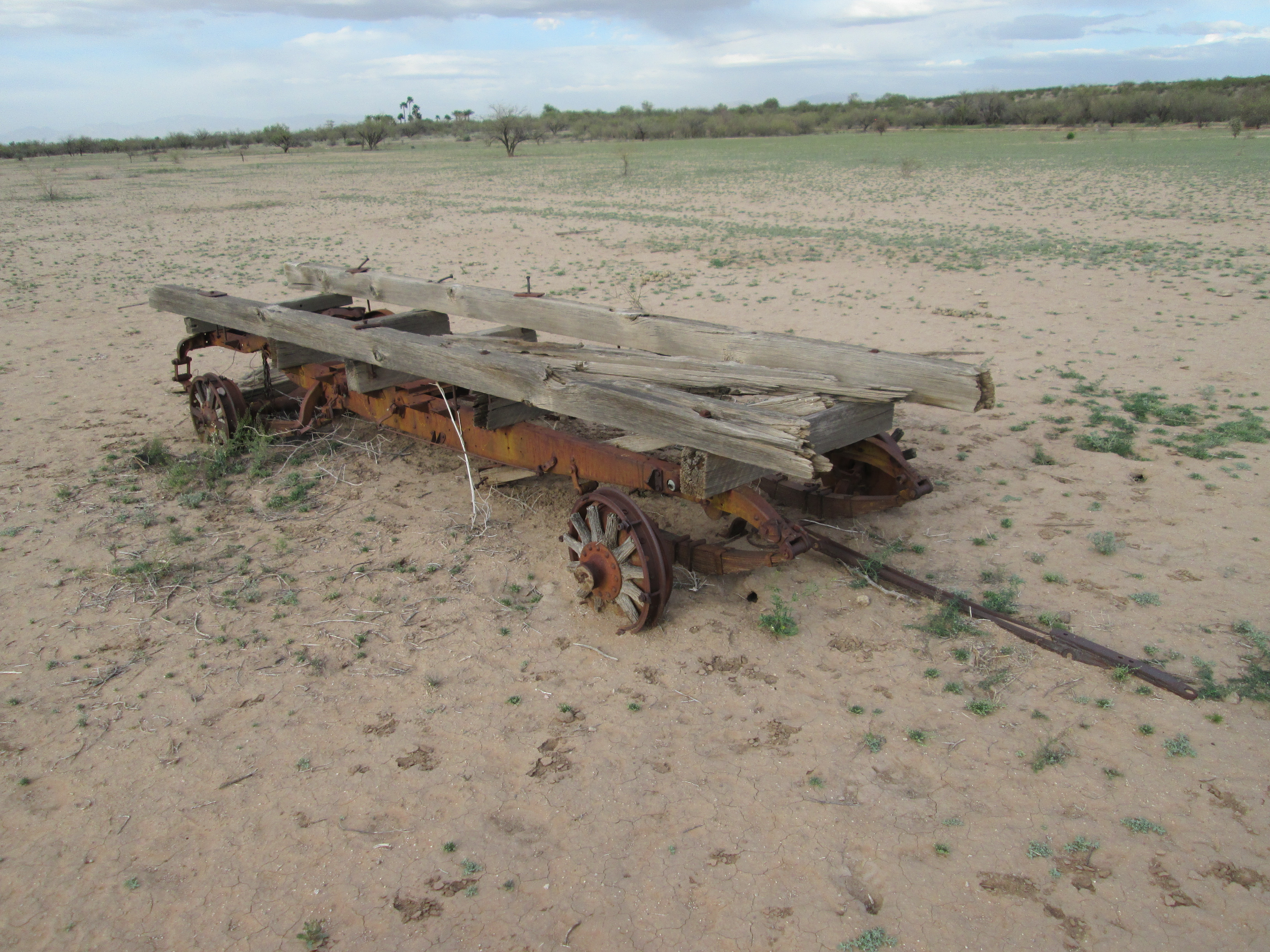
The remains of a farm wagon in an abandoned field near Quail Creek

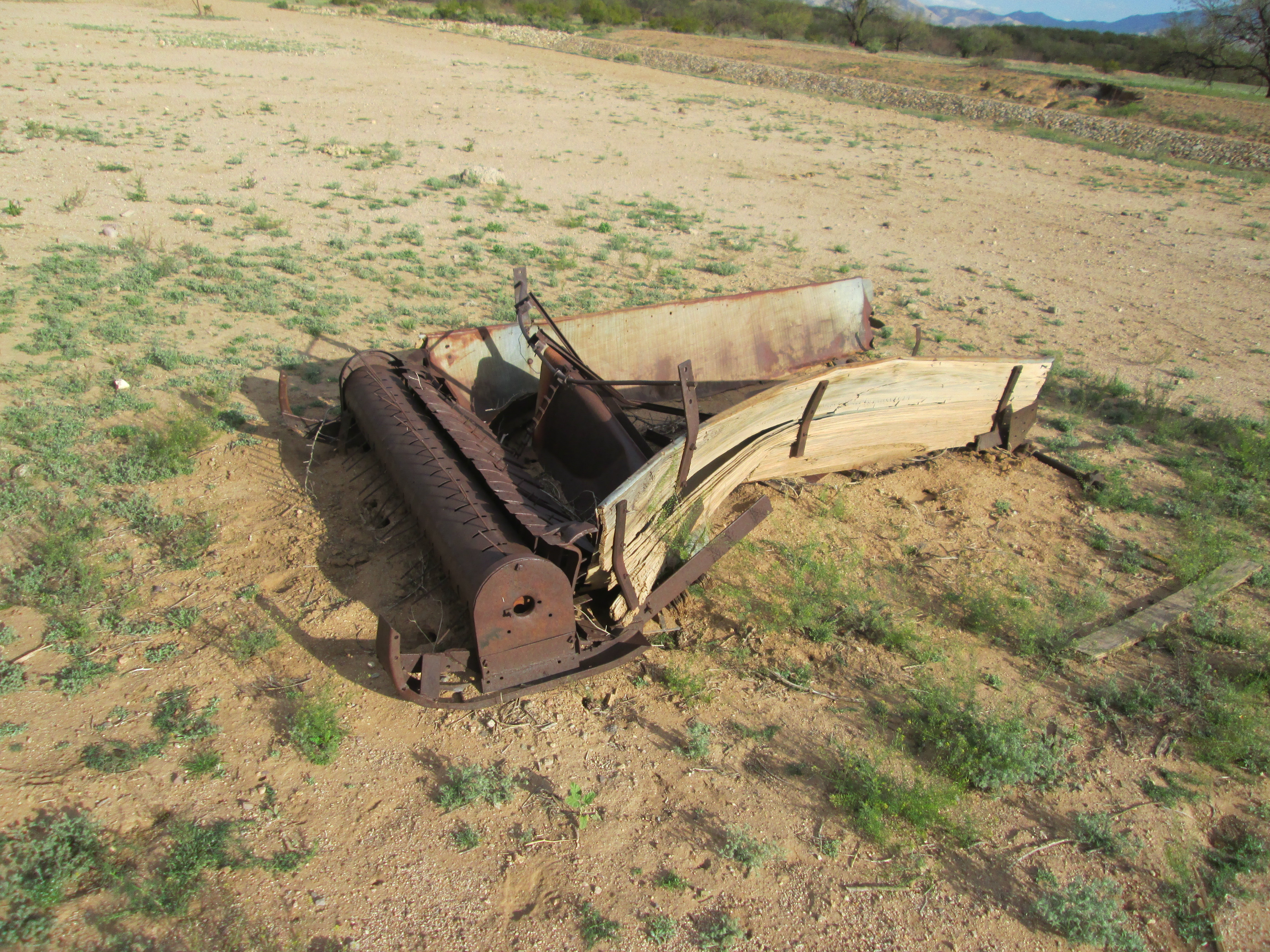
Abandoned reel and chute of harvesting equipment

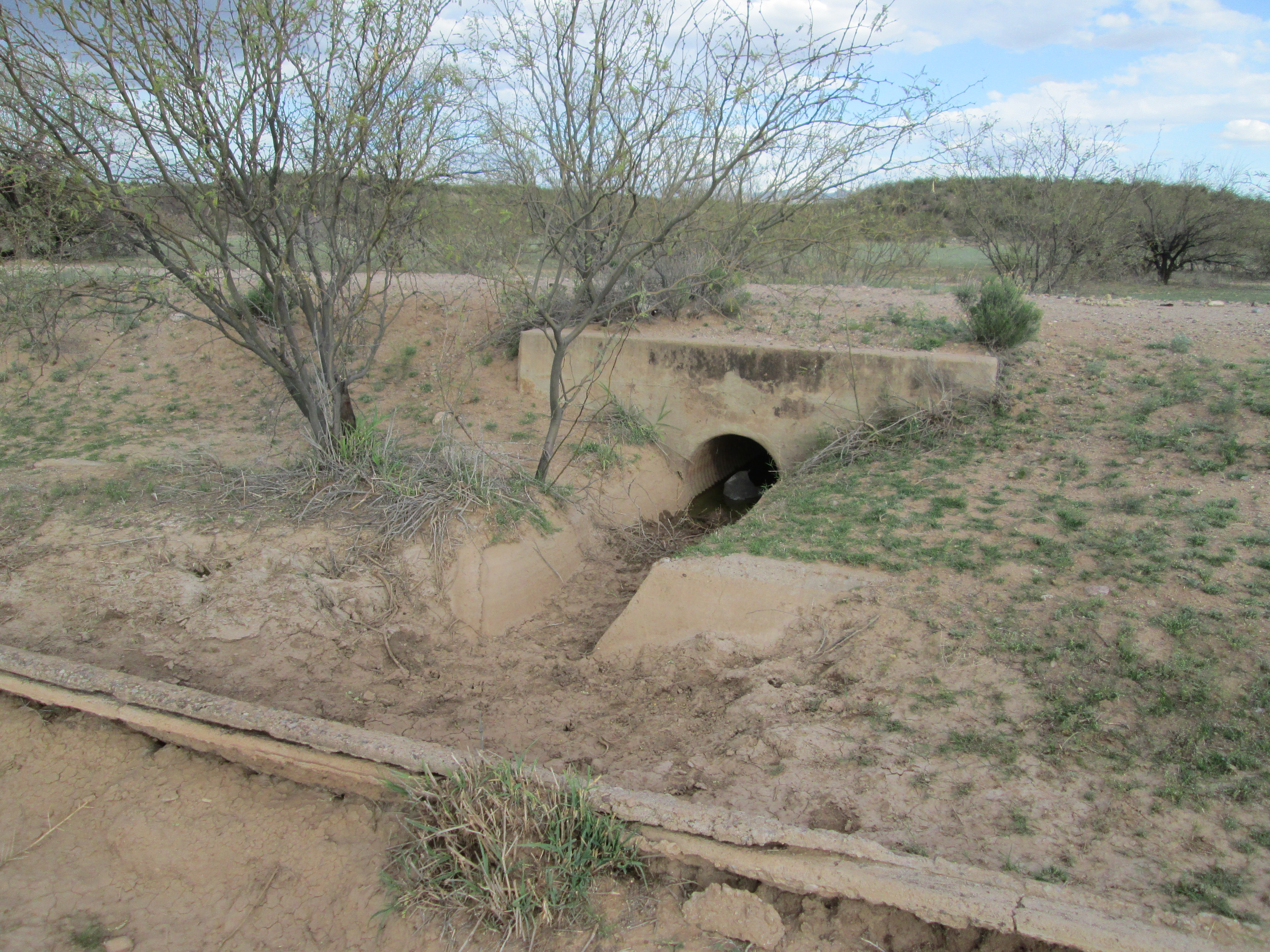
The ruins of a canal and a small bridge in the field

== See also ==
- Santa Rita Experimental Range and Wildlife Area
- United States home front during World War I
- United States involvement in the Mexican Revolution
- Arizona during World War II
