= Santa Rita Experimental Range and Wildlife Area =

Biological research and field station in Arizona, United States

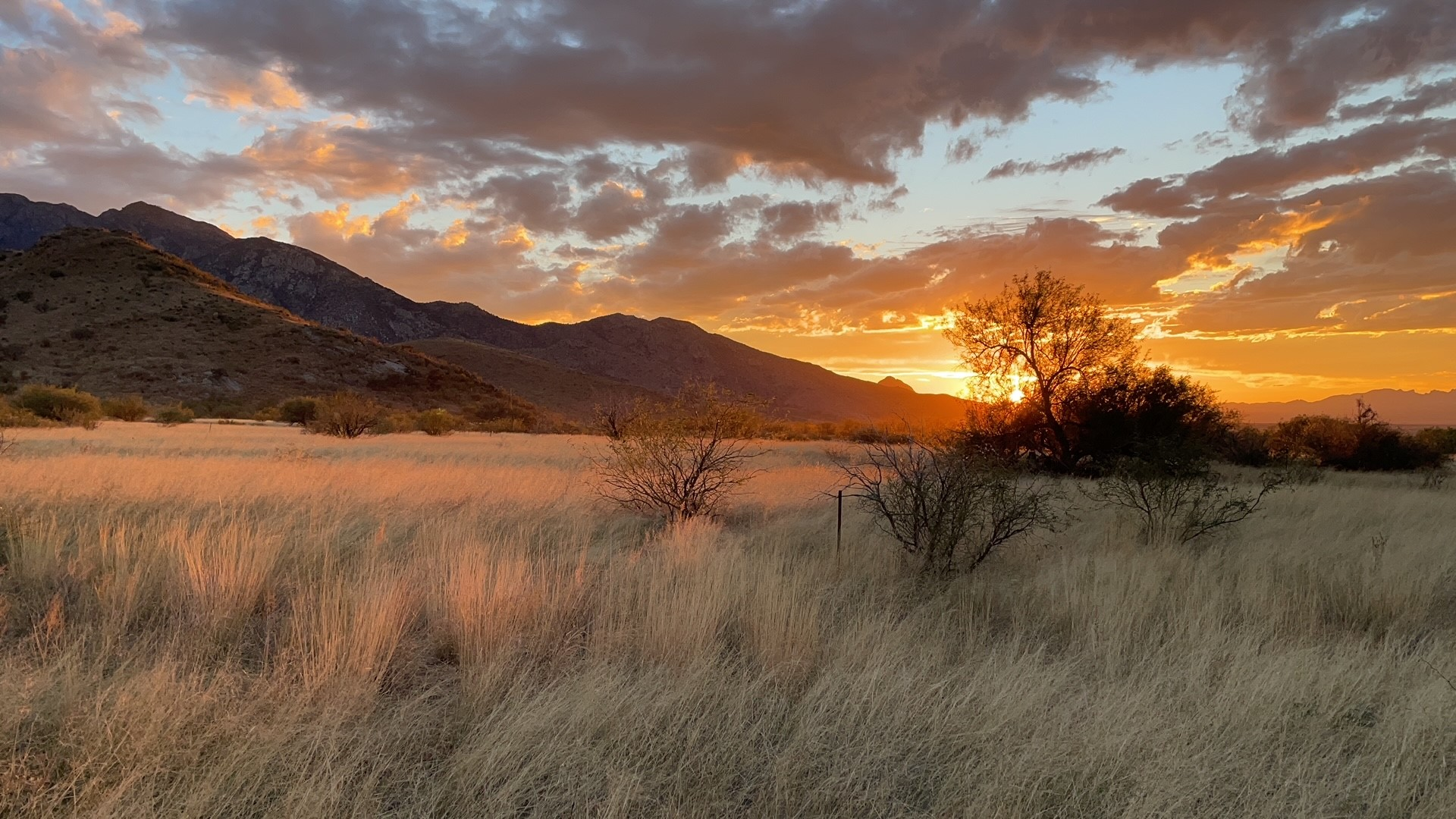
- Established: 1903
- Field of research: Agricultural science Environmental science
- Location: Pima County, Arizona, 85721, US; 31°50′00″N 110°51′10″W
- Campus: University of Arizona ALVSCE
- Operating agency: University of Arizona
- Website: Santa Rita Experimental Range

The Santa Rita Experimental Range and Wildlife Area is the longest continuously active rangeland research facility and among the five oldest biological field stations in the United States. Located south of Tucson in Pima County, Arizona, the 52,000 acre Santa Rita Experimental Range (SRER) was founded in 1903 and administered by the United States Forest Service until 1987, when the University of Arizona College of Agriculture took over administration of the site. The mission at the SRER is "to advance research and education on the ecology and management of desert rangelands through the secure, long-term access to research areas, state-of-the-art facilities, new discoveries, and research legacies."

== Environmental data ==
The SRER makes available several spatial and time series data sets for research purposes including monthly resolution precipitation data from 1922 to present, long term vegetation response studies, and livestock grazing histories. Additionally, the SRER maintains a repeat photography archive, allowing researchers to visually inspect land cover and landscape changes for 117 locations from as early as 1902 to present. The National Ecological Observatory Network also publicly publishes data collected on the range.

== Gallery ==
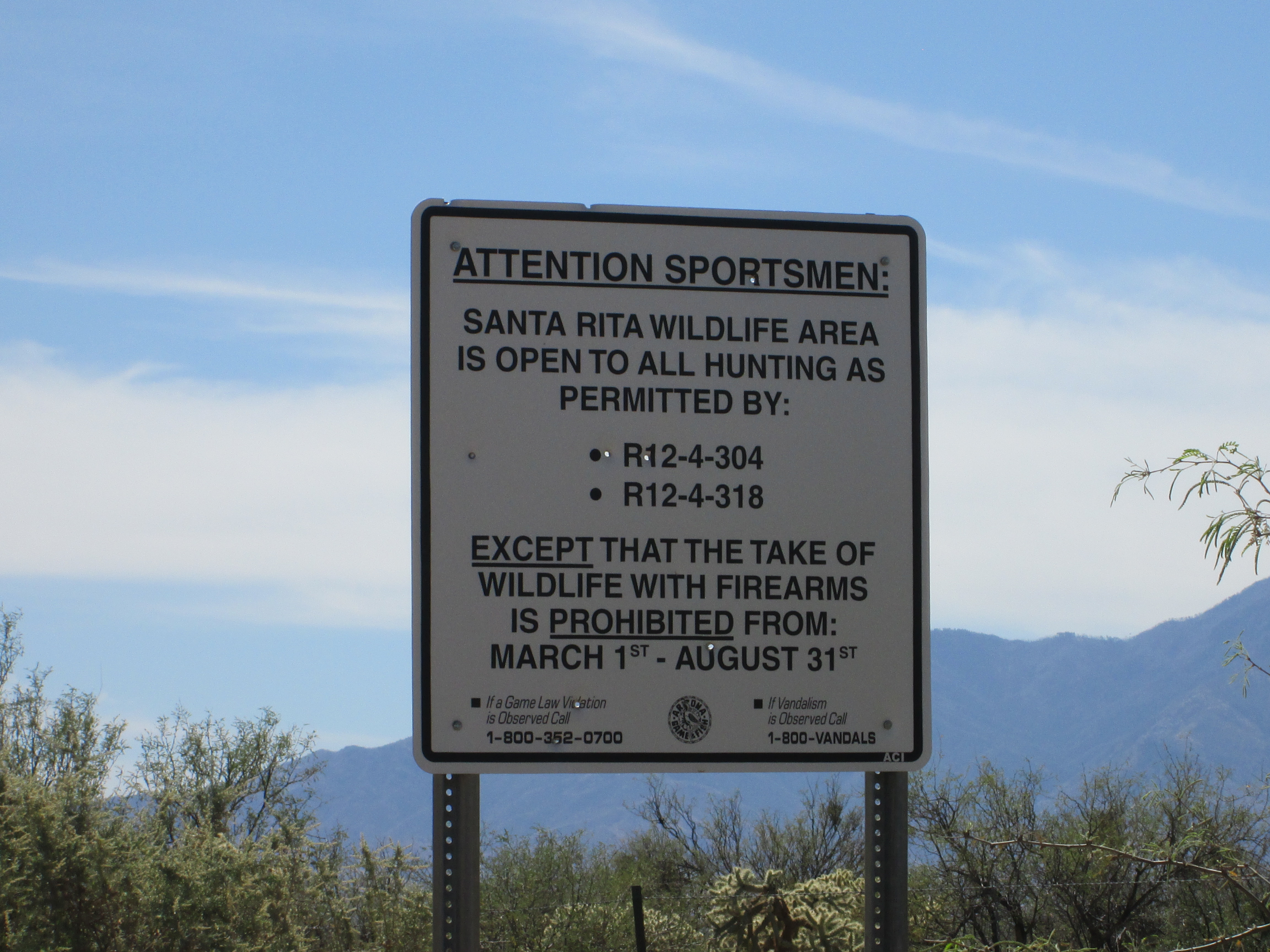
A Santa Rita Wildlife Area sign.

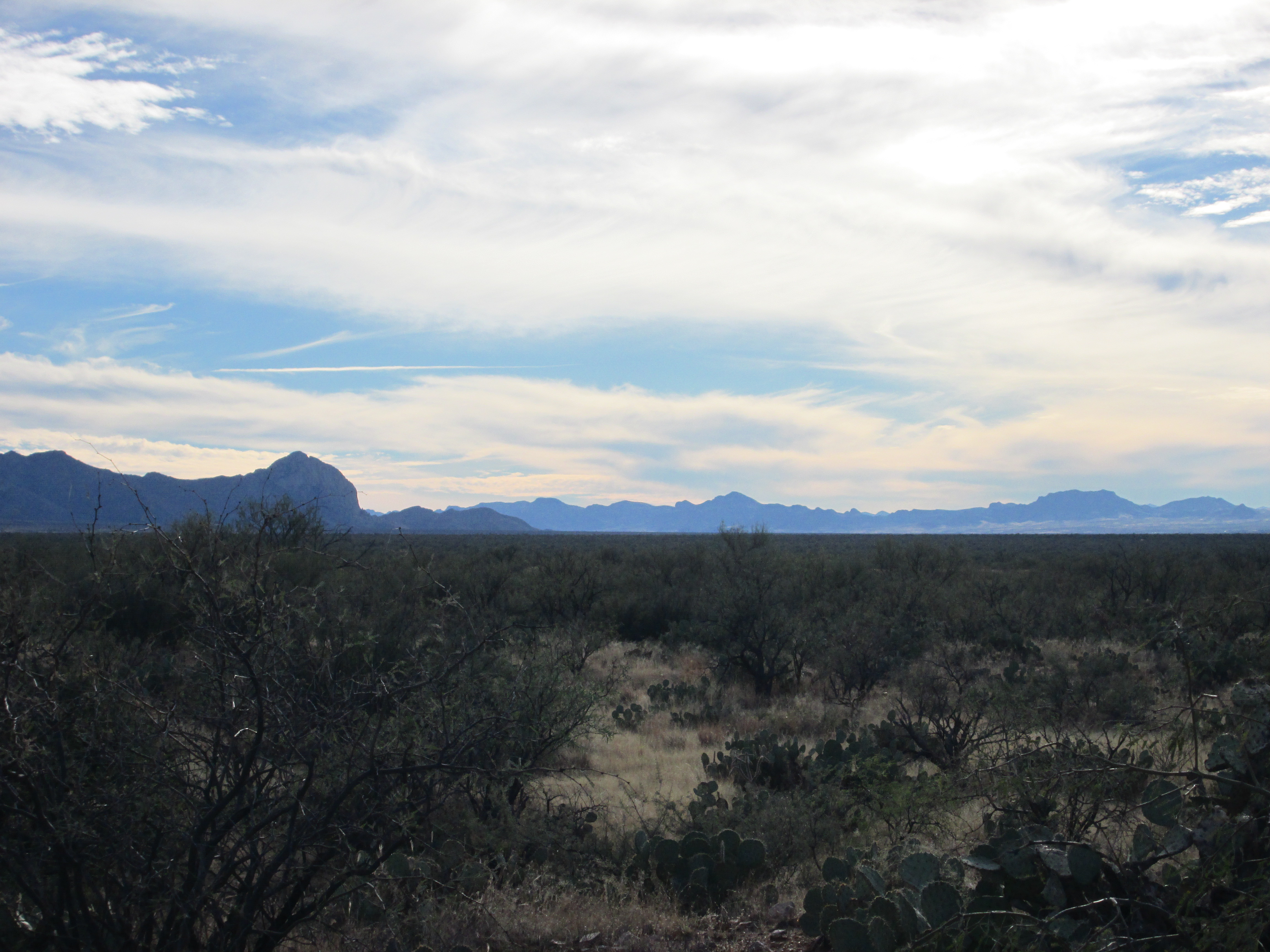
A view across the SRER, facing south. Elephant Head is in the background at the left.

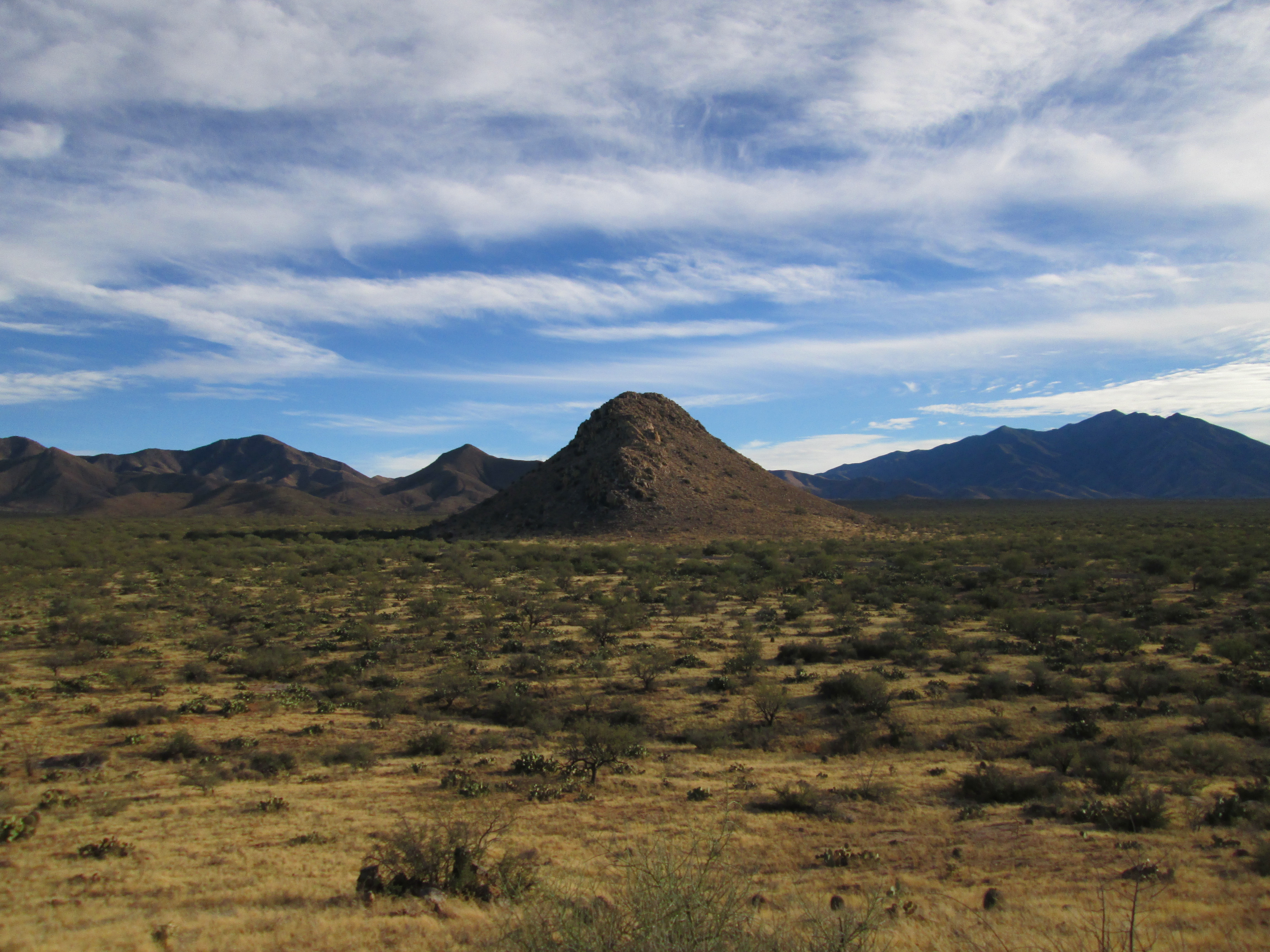
Huerfano Butte is a dominant landmark in the SRER.

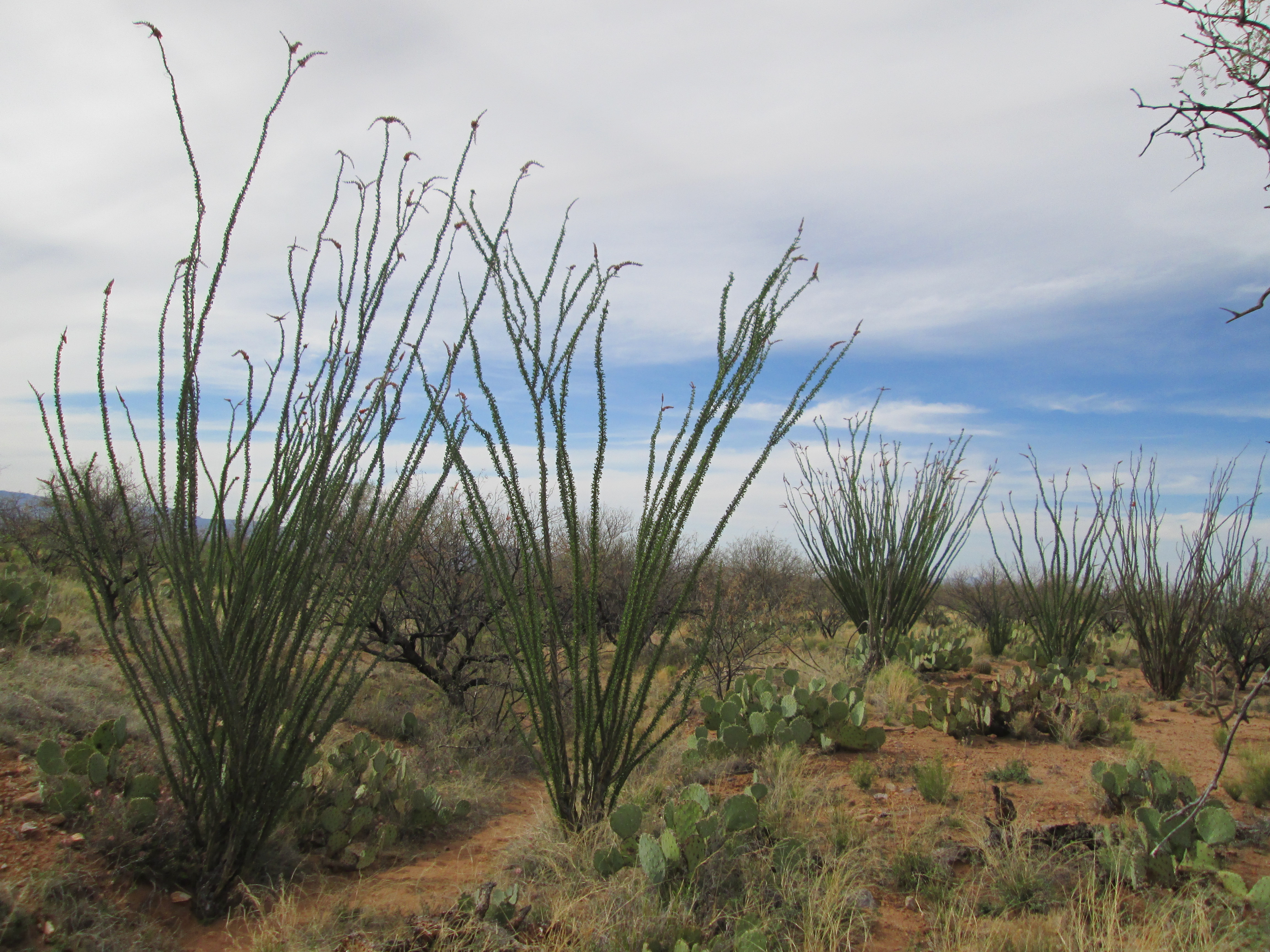
Ocotillo in the SRER.

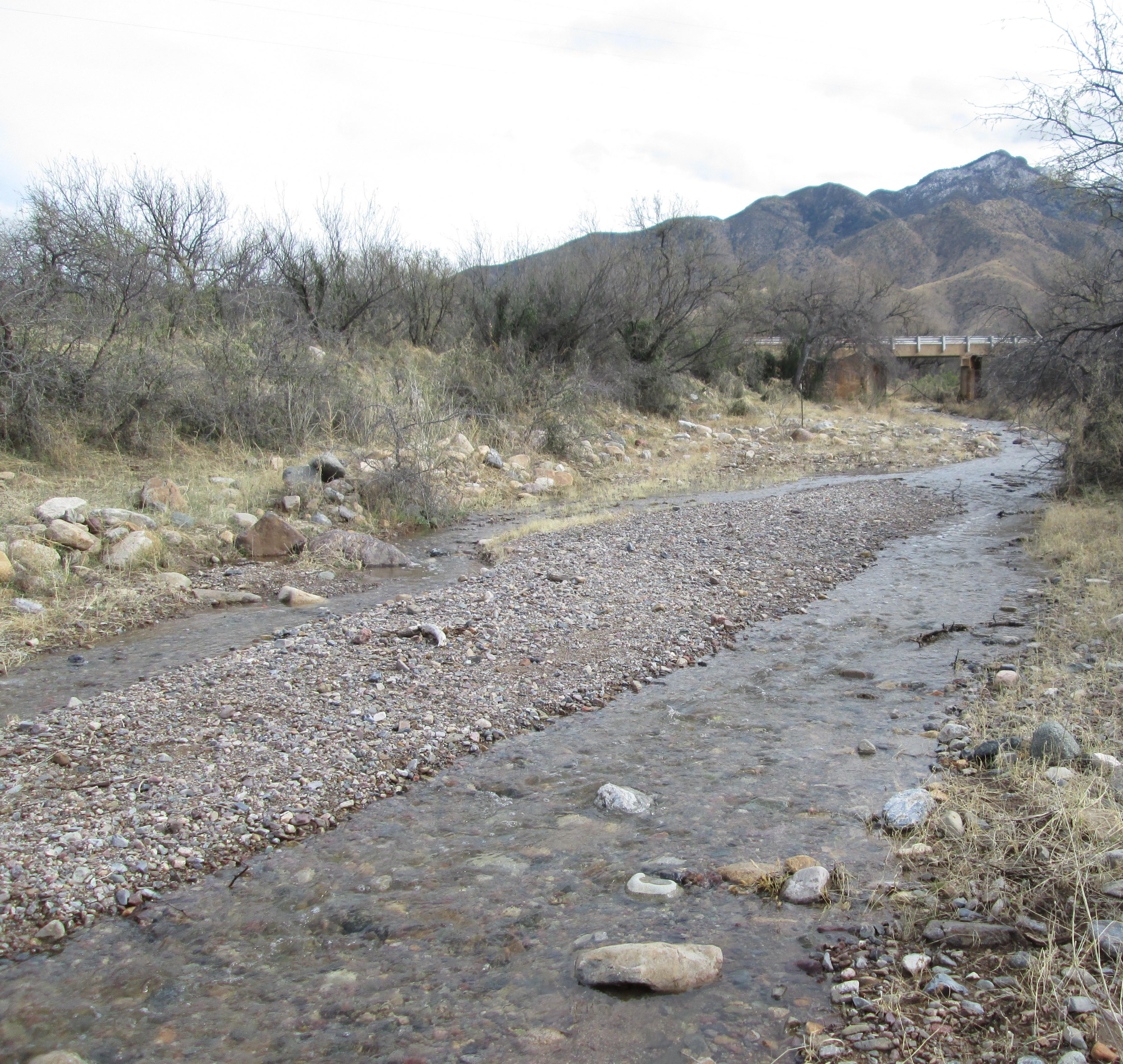
Florida Canyon Wash in March 2014.

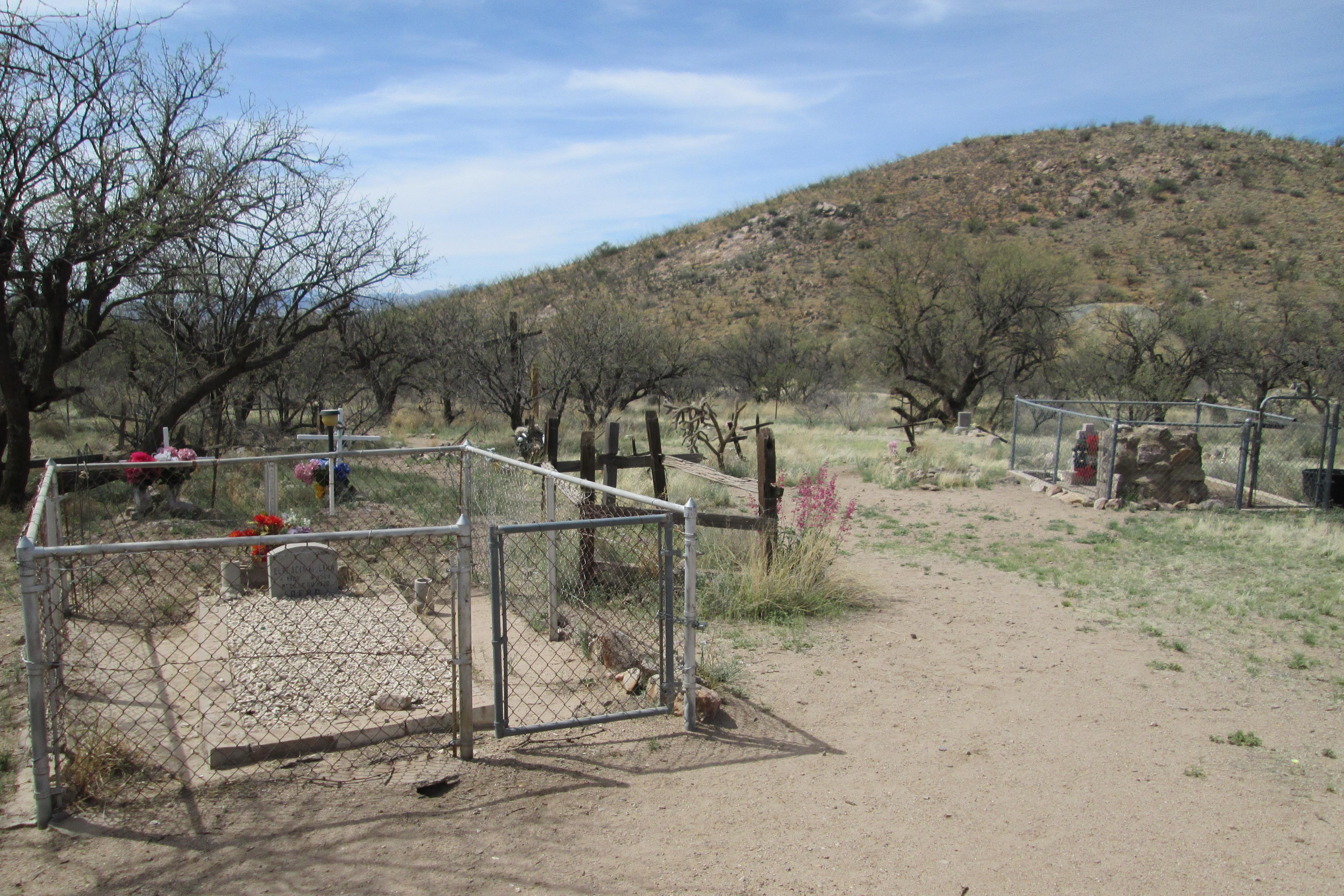
Helvetia Cemetery

== See also ==
- Santa Rita Mountains
- Madera Canyon (Arizona)
- Continental, Arizona
