= Madera Canyon (Arizona) =

Landform in Pima and Santa Cruz Counties

- White House Canyon
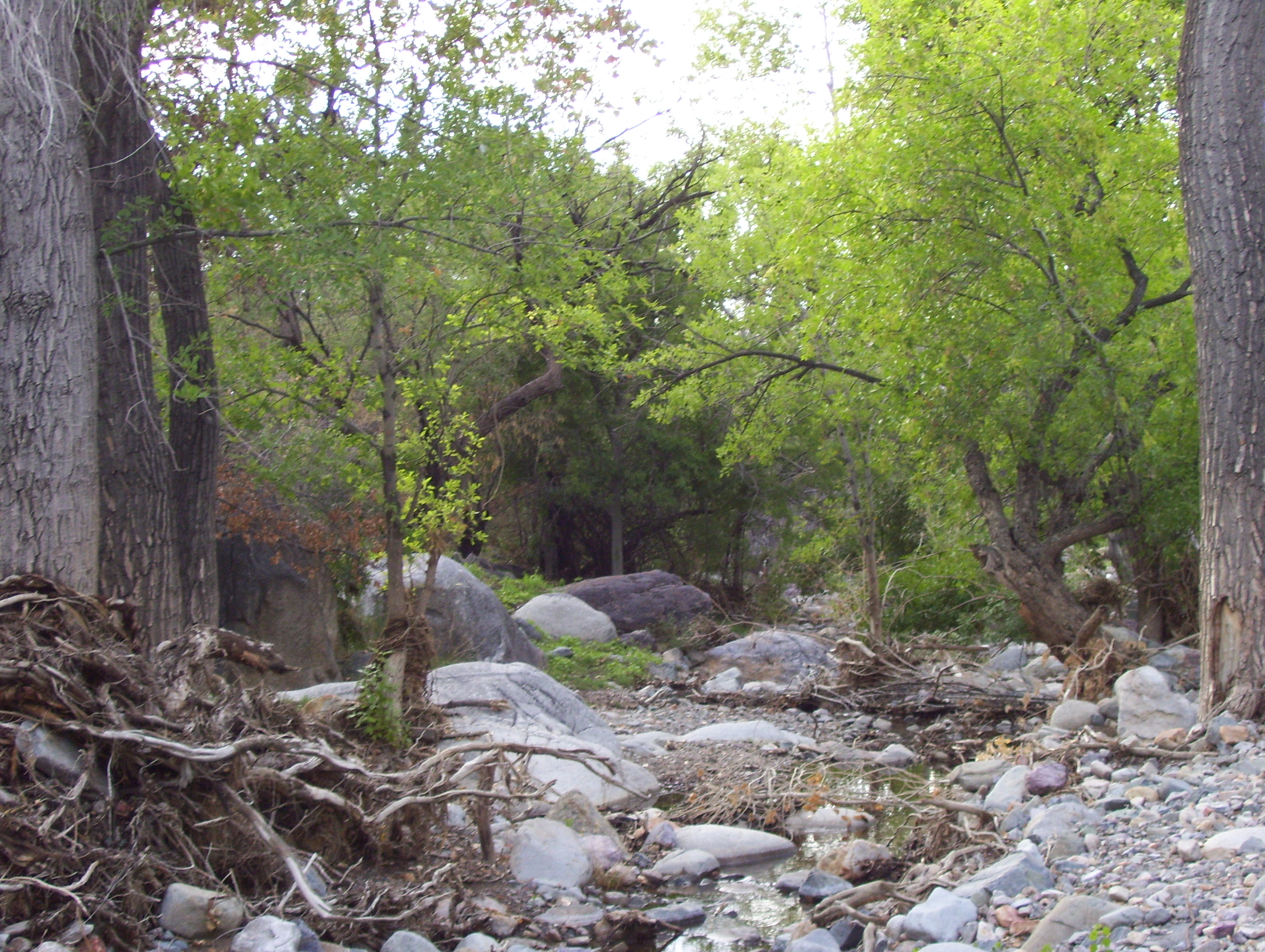
- The canyon floor.

- Location within Arizona
- Floor elevation: 3,562 feet (1,086 m)

Geography
- Location: Santa Rita Mountains, Arizona, US
- Coordinates: 31°43′33″N 110°52′49″W
- Topo map: USGS Mount Hopkins, AZ
- Rivers: Madera Creek
- Interactive map of Madera Canyon

Madera Canyon is a canyon in the northwestern face of the Santa Rita Mountains, twenty-five miles southeast of Tucson, Arizona. As part of the Coronado National Forest, Madera Canyon has campsites, picnic areas, and miles of hiking trails. The canyon is also used as a resting place for migrating birds, and it is thus known as a premier birdwatching area. Madera Canyon was originally named White House Canyon, after a prominent white adobe house was built there in the late 19th century. The canyon was renamed sometime in the early 1900s, although some locals still use the original name.

== Flora and fauna ==
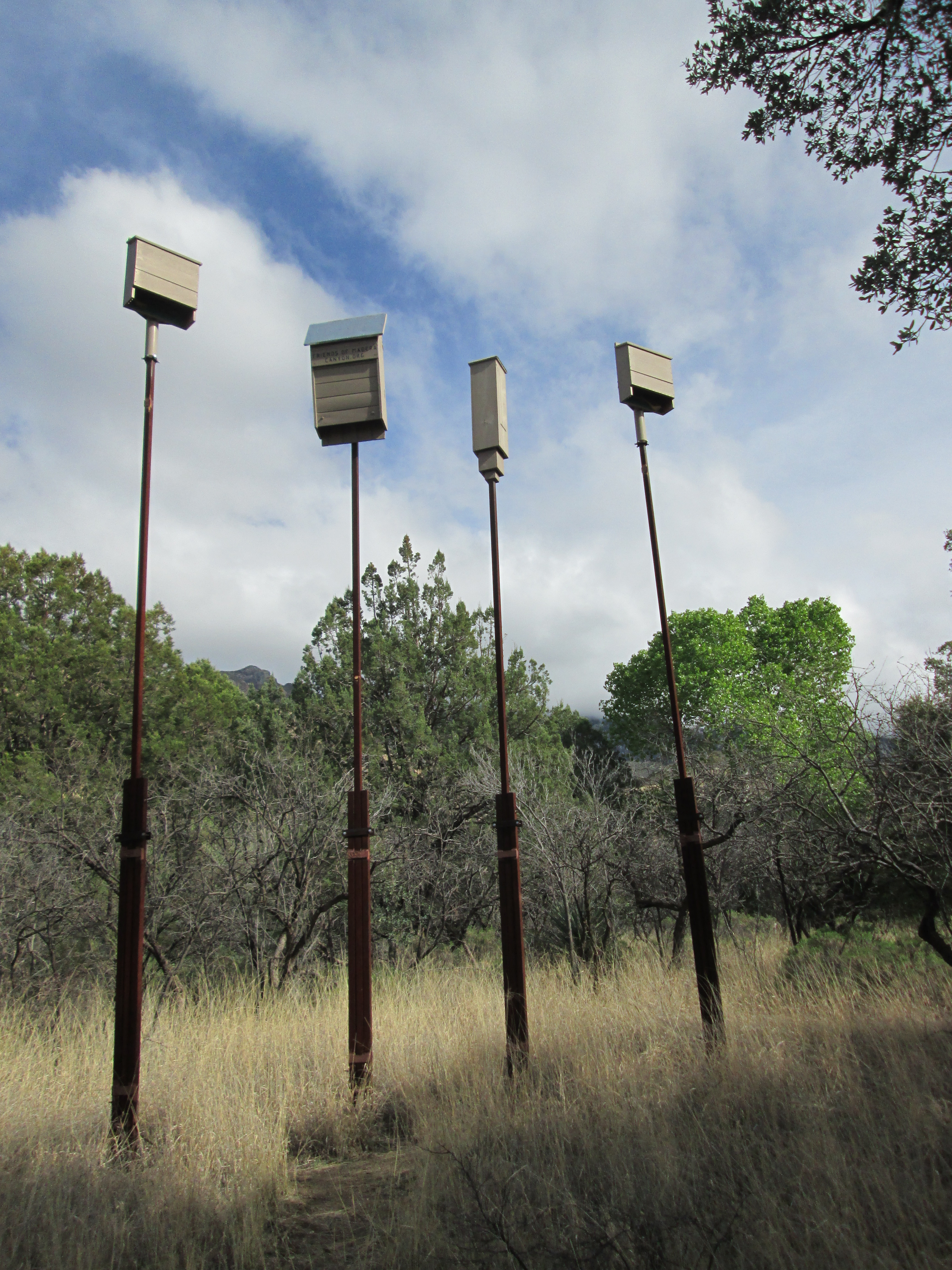
Bat houses in the canyon

Madera Canyon is located in the Santa Rita Mountains, which is one of the largest of the Madrean Sky Islands. The canyon and its immediate surroundings are therefore home to wide variety of flora and fauna, ranging from cactus covered desert in the lower reaches of the canyon to aspen and fir forest on Mount Wrightson.

With fifteen species of hummingbird, elegant trogon, sulphur-bellied flycatcher, bridled titmouse, painted redstart, yellow-eyed junco, varied bunting, pyrrhuloxia, black-capped gnatcatcher, flame-colored tanager, thirty-six species of wood warblers, and over 256 species of birds documented in total, Madera Canyon is rated the third best birding destination in the United States. Other animals that can be found in Madera Canyon include black bears, mountain lions, bobcats, white-tailed and mule deer, peccary, foxes, coatis, ringtails, raccoons, wild turkeys, squirrels, and rabbits. Sixteen species of bats have also been recorded in the canyon.

Life Zones

Madera Canyon is a bowl-shaped watershed. Side-canyons funnel water from springs and runoff in seasonal streams that feed Madera Creek. This stream system and the abundant plants along its banks form a riparian corridor. The corridor descends through all of the canyon's four life zones and creates excellent wildlife habitat.

- Lower Sonoran Zone (0 to 4,500 feet) – This life zone extends from above the mouth of Madera Canyon down to the Santa Cruz Valley. Sonoran Desert scrub with desert trees, shrubs, and cactus grows in hot, dry lower elevations. A transition to desert grassland with grasses, shrubs and velvet mesquite occurs as temperature and moisture moderate higher up. Summer here is hot, commonly above 100 °F, although storms bring occasional rain, and winters are cool, being in the 60s, with rain possible. Snow is rare, and even in the coldest and snowiest years, only happens a couple times.
- Upper Sonoran Zone (4,500 to 6,500 feet) – Arising around the canyon mouth, this zone is cooler and more moist than the Lower Sonoran below. Summers are warm, with average temperatures in the 80s and 90s, and stormy, with winters being colder and snowier, with snow usually being only a few inches deep, and average highs in the 50s and sometimes 40s. It is composed primarily of two woodland plant communities and represented by plants such as evergreen oaks, alligator juniper, Mexican piñon pine, shrubs, and bunchgrasses.
- Transition Zone (6,500 to 8,000 feet) – Summer here is mild, the daytime temperature being about 70° or 80°, with storms being common, due to orographic lift. Winters are freezing, with highs in the 40s and 30s, and very snowy, with snowstorms commonly leaving up to a foot of snow on the ground. The Transition Zone is characterized by many plants common to the Rocky Mountains. Ponderosa pine, deciduous Gambel oak, smooth sumac, maples, and other mountain species grow in the upper canyon.
- Canadian Zone (8,000 to 9,500 feet) – The highest and coolest life zone in the Santa Rita Mountains occurs on the lofty peaks above the canyon. Plants such as Douglas fir, white fir, quaking aspen, and kinnikinnick grow in this high altitude zone. Summer in this life zone is cool, usually around 70 °F – 60 °F in the daytime, being around 30° cooler than the surrounding desert, and is much stormier, with thunderstorms constantly drenching the area with rain due to orographic lift. Winter is frigid, almost always below freezing, and snow is very common. It's not uncommon for snowstorms to dump over a foot of snow.

== History ==
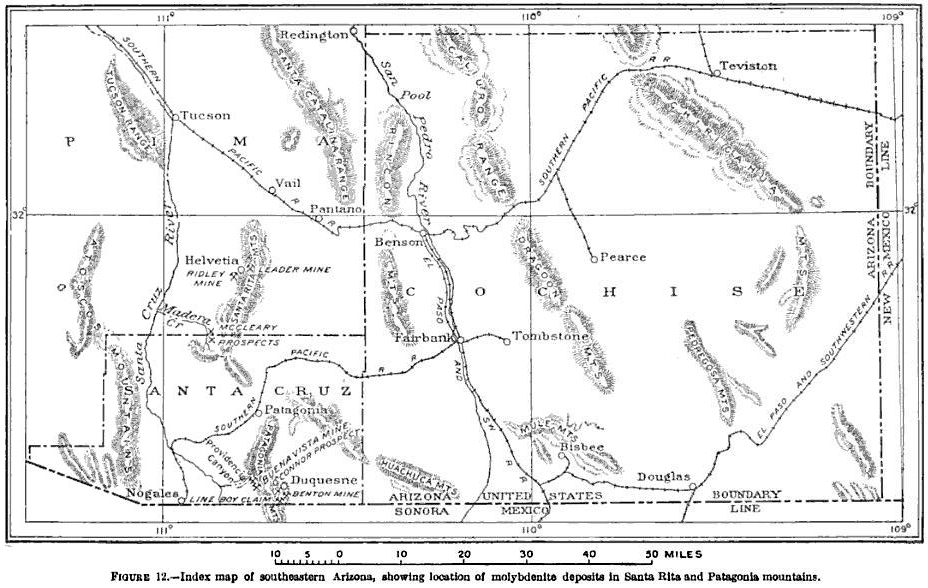
USGS map of southeastern Arizona including Madera Creek, c.1910.

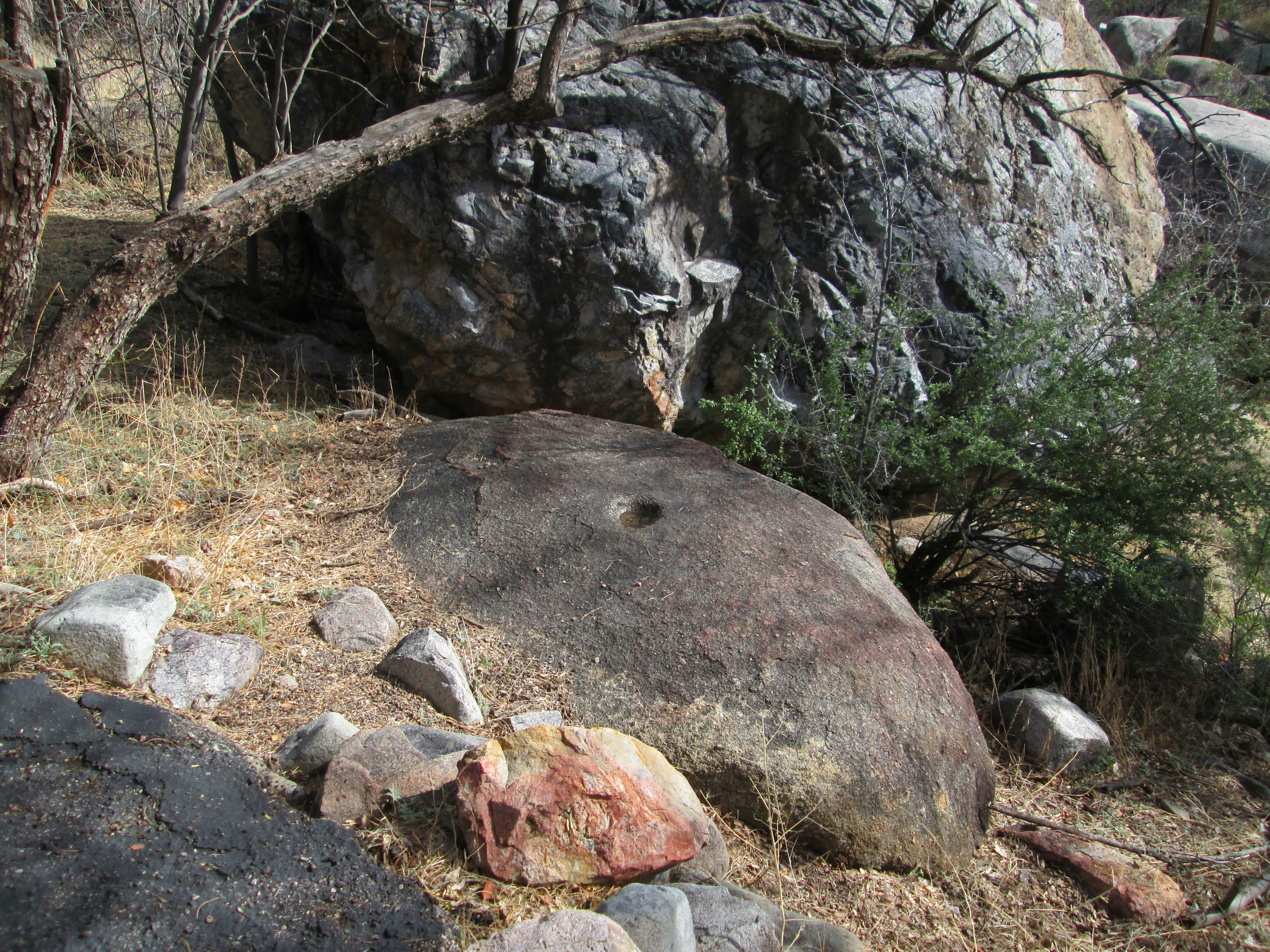
A bedrock mortar along Madera Creek.

The Santa Rita Mountains were filled with prospectors in the early 1900s, with over a dozen mines operating in Madera Canyon alone. One was owned by a colorful character named Ben Daniels, who had once served as a marshal in Dodge City, Tombstone, and other rough Western towns, and had fought in the Spanish–American War with the Rough Riders. Daniels later built a home in Madera Canyon and was elected sheriff of Pima County in 1920. His wife became the Pima County Superintendent of Schools.

The Pennington family lived in the area in the 1870s and a daughter, Larcena Pennington Page, was kidnapped by Apaches, tortured, and left for dead. She survived and made it back to her family. Josephine Peak is named for another daughter, Josephine Pennington. Other well-known places are named after miners, ranchers, and settlers. Sprung Spring was named after the Sprung family, for it is thought that it was they who first improved it. Mount Wrightson was originally named 'Old Baldy' after Captain Richard Ewell, who bore the same name, and was stationed at Ft. Buchanan in the 1850s. But his service in the CSA denied his name being attached to the peak. William Wrightson, who brought Arizona's first press around South America, and who later ventured in mining, was killed alongside of Gilbert Hopkins in 1865. It was their names which were assigned to the two prominent mountains nearby.

In 1905, Madera Canyon and the Santa Rita Mountains became a part of the new National Forest System.

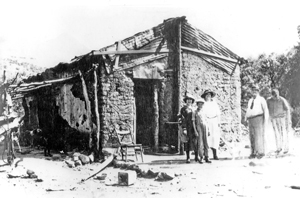
The White House in the late 1880s.

The White House

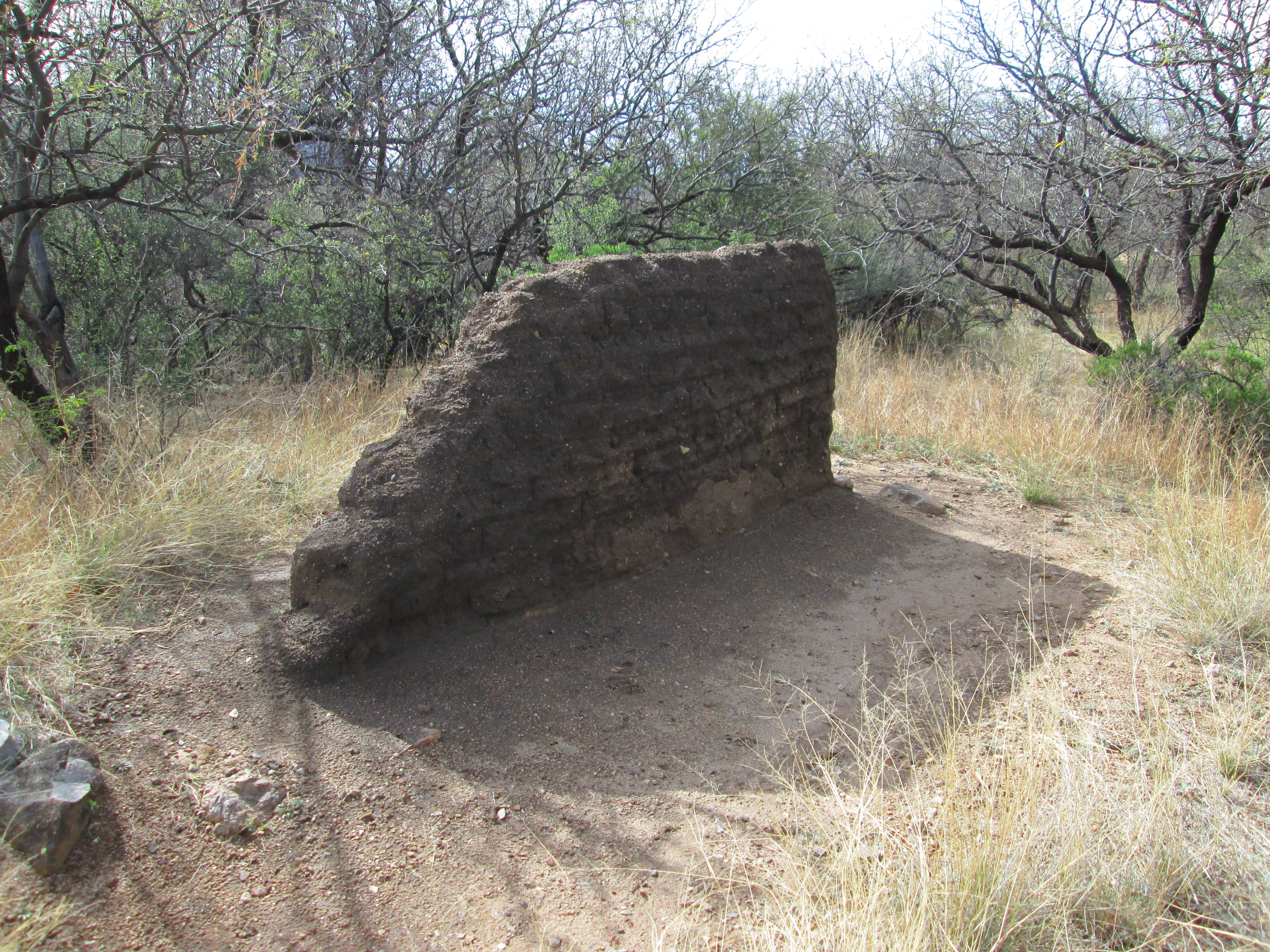
The remains of the White House in 2014.

The White House was one of the "first permanent structures" built in Madera Canyon. It is thought to have been constructed by a sheepherder named Walden in the late 1870s or early 1880s. Walden left around 1882 and the two or three room house was taken over by Theodore Wellish and his family as a summer retreat. Wellish owned the White House Mercantile Company in Tucson, and thus it was assumed that he was the one who whitewashed the adobe building, giving it its name. The White House was well known and easily recognizable, and so it became a landmark for determining the location of the many different mining claims in and around the area.

Two brothers named Atondo and Rufino Paz also lived at the White House at different times around the turn of the century. After their marriage in 1911, the sixty-one-year-old Alcaro Morales, and his twenty-seven-year-old bride named Benita, moved into the house. Alcaro delivered their five children in the home. Tragically, both Benita and her fifth child died during childbirth in 1921. She and her newborn son were buried together in a small plot near the house. The rest of the family continued to live in the house until Alcaro's death in 1940 at the age of ninety.

In 2002, the USFS and the non-profit organization Friends Of Madera Canyon conducted an archeological dig at the site of the house. Only a small portion of one wall remains standing, but they were able to determine where the outside walls and the house's front door had been. The site of the house is near the Proctor Road crossing in Madera Canyon, and can be accessed by a short, paved pathway.

== Gallery ==
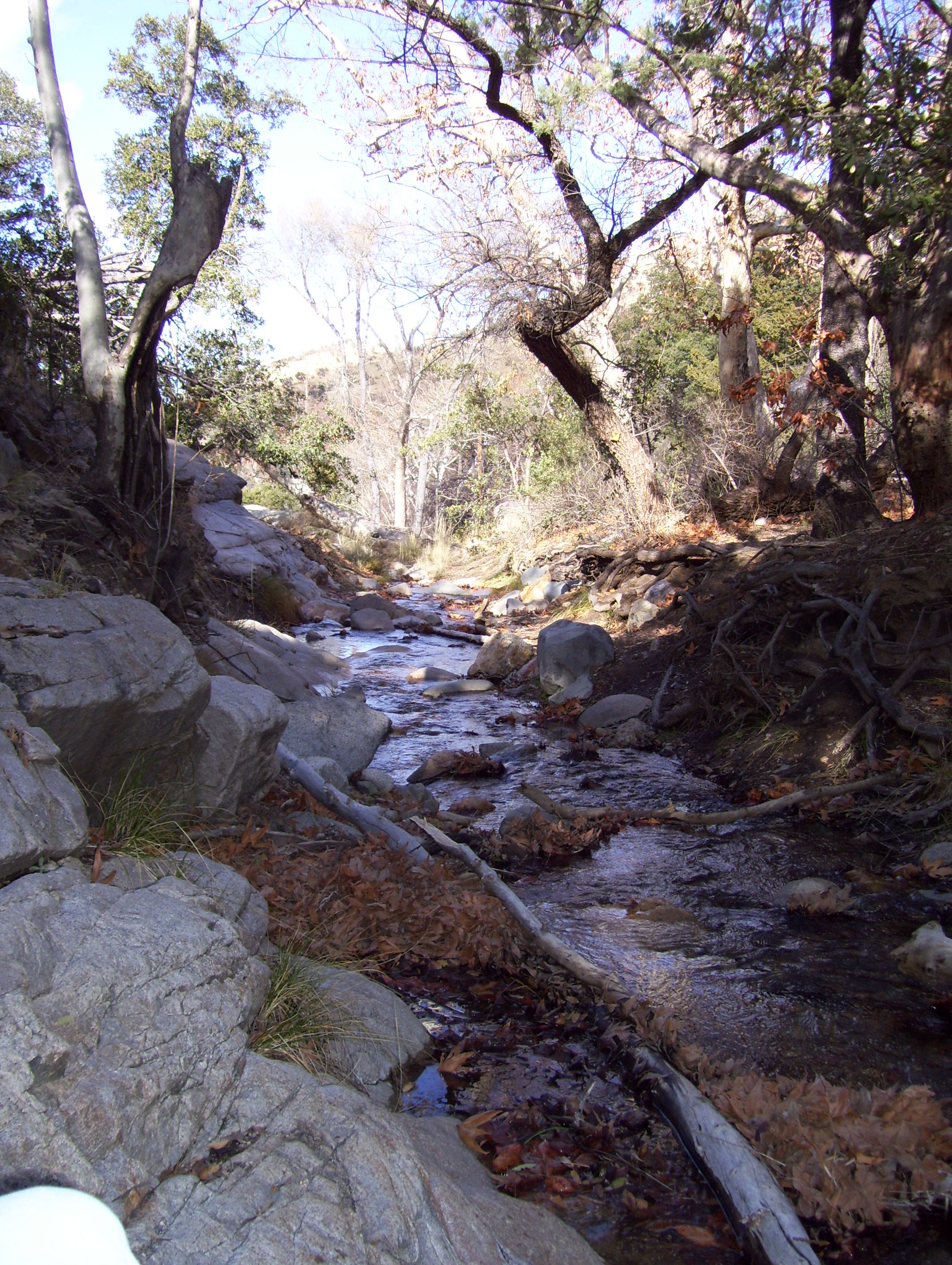
Madera Creek

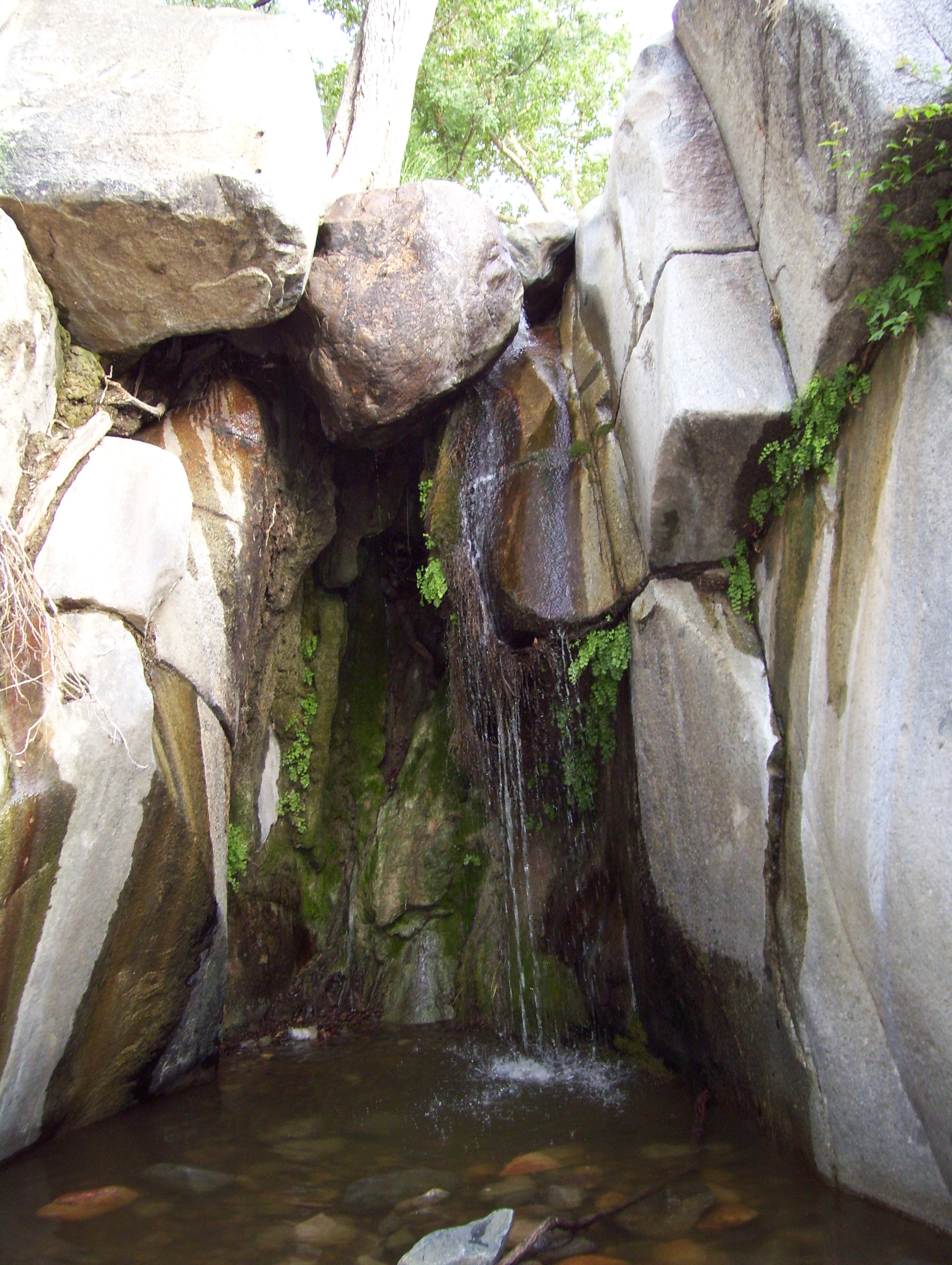
Proctor Falls in the summer of 2007.

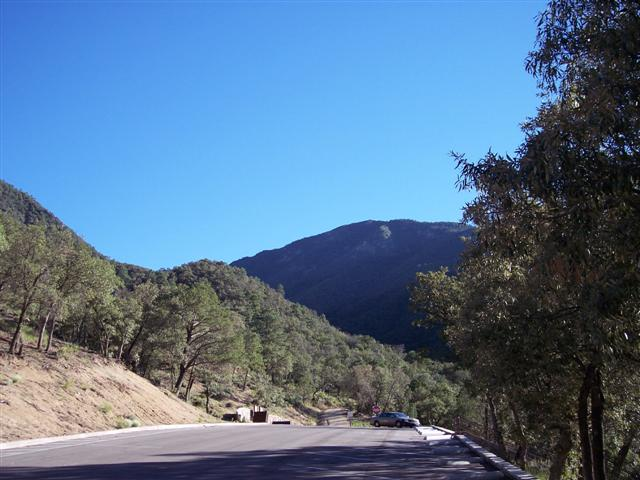
View of the Santa Ritas from Madera Canyon.

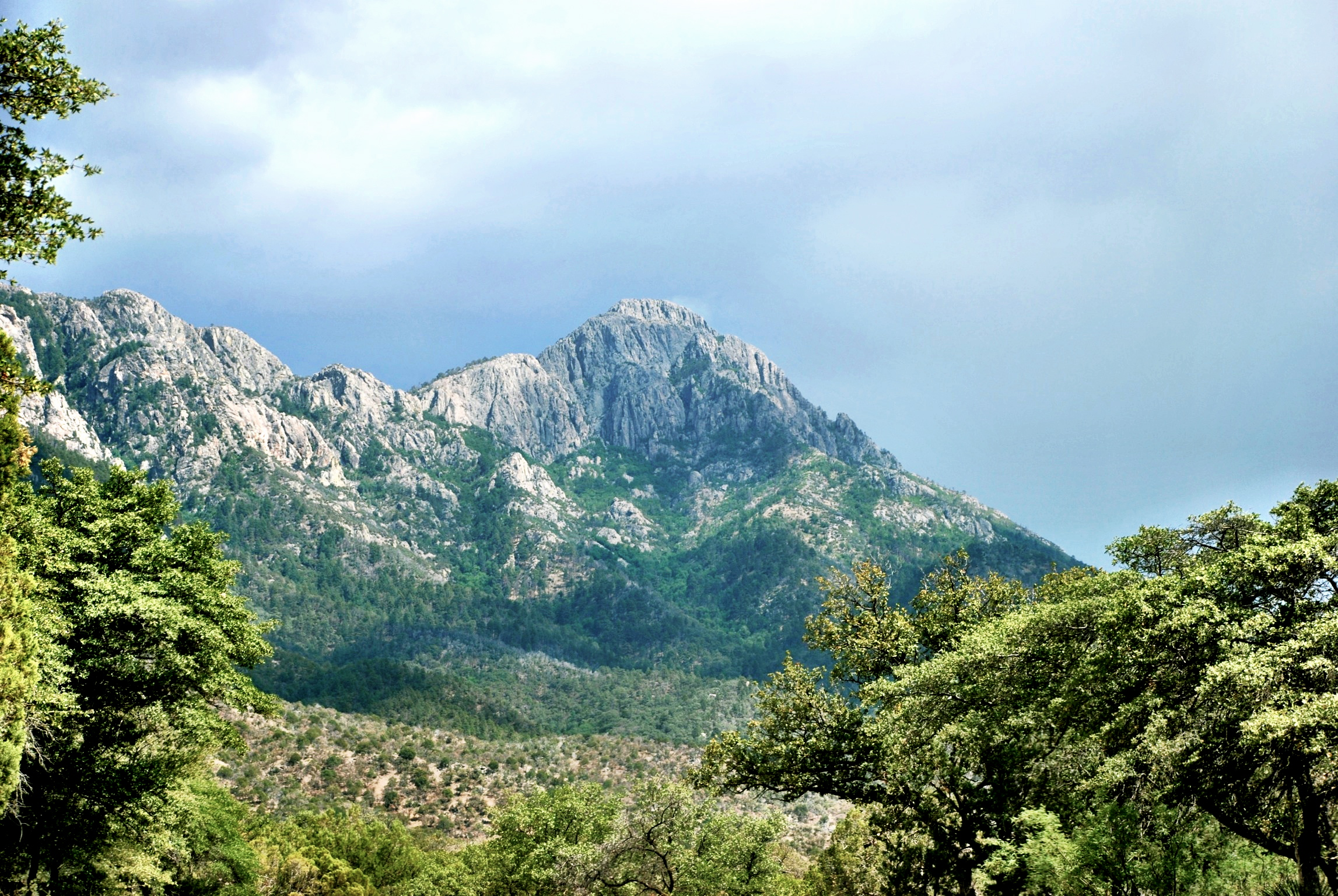
Mount Wrightson from Madera Canyon in 2012.

== See also ==
- Santa Rita Experimental Range and Wildlife Area
- Continental, Arizona
- Larcena Pennington Page
