= Mount Wrightson =

Peak of the Santa Rita Mountains, Arizona

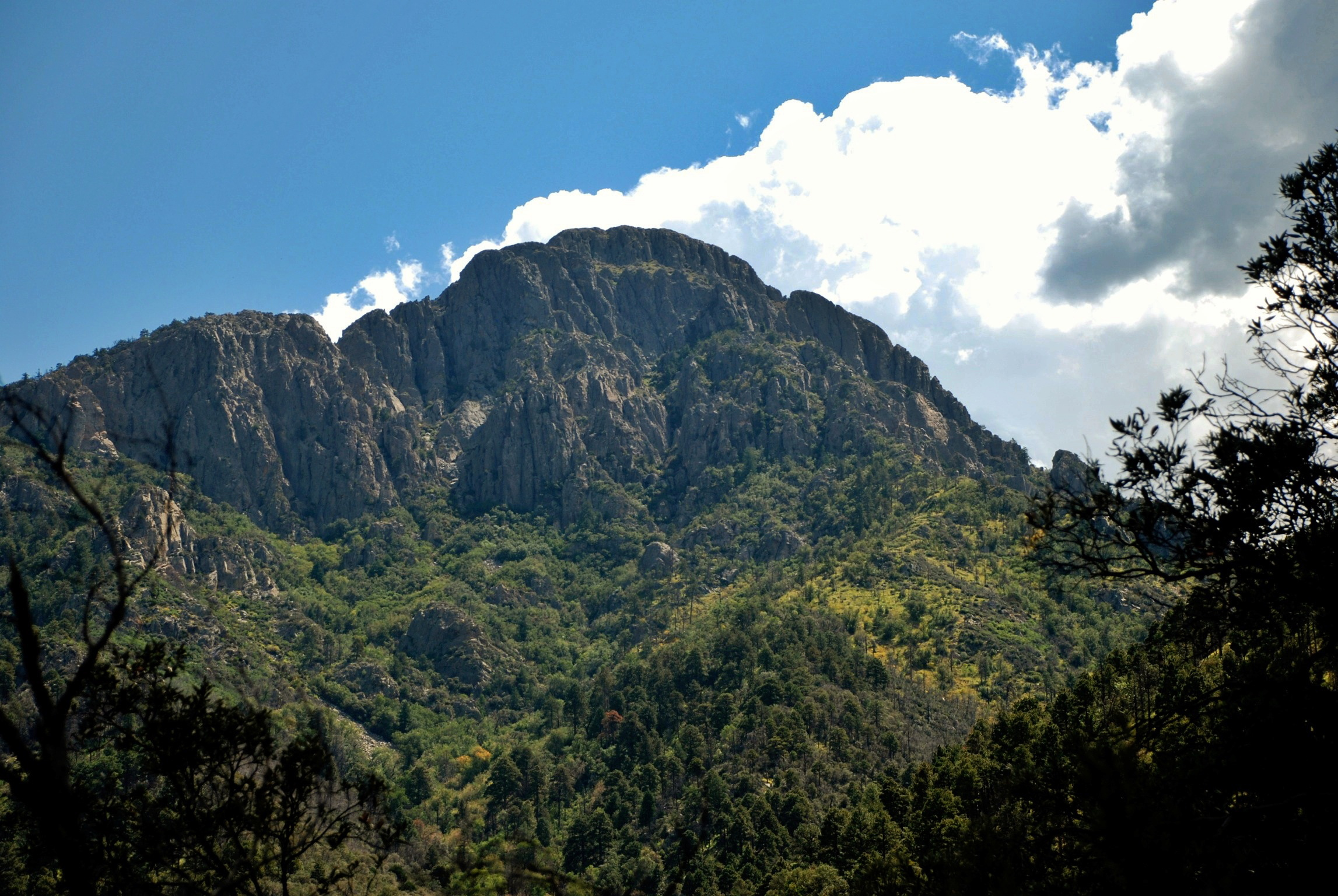
- Mount Wrightson from Madera Canyon

Highest point
- Elevation: 9,456 ft (2,882 m) NAVD 88
- Prominence: 4,578 ft (1,395 m)
- Listing: Arizona county high point
- Coordinates: 31°41′45″N 110°50′54″W

Geography
- Location: Santa Cruz County, Arizona, U.S.
- Parent range: Santa Rita Mountains
- Topo map: USGS Mount Wrightson (AZ)

Climbing
- Easiest route: Hike, class 1

Mount Wrightson (O'odham: Ce:wi Duag) is a 9,456-foot (2,882 m) peak in the Santa Rita Mountains within the Coronado National Forest, in southern Arizona, United States.

It was renamed from its original O'odham name: Ce:wi Duag for William Wrightson, a miner and entrepreneur in the region killed by Apaches in the 1865 Battle of Fort Buchanan.

== Geography ==
Mount Wrightson is the highest point in the Santa Rita Mountains and the Tucson region, lying 40 miles (64 km) southeast of the city. Its distinctive pyramid-shaped profile is visible from much of southeastern Arizona and adjoining areas in Sonora, Mexico.

== Flora ==
Mount Wrightson's flora includes grassy, high desert chaparral, mixed conifers with Arizona, Apache, and Chihuahua pines, Arizona madrone, aspen, oak brush, and Douglas fir and ponderosa pine near the summit.

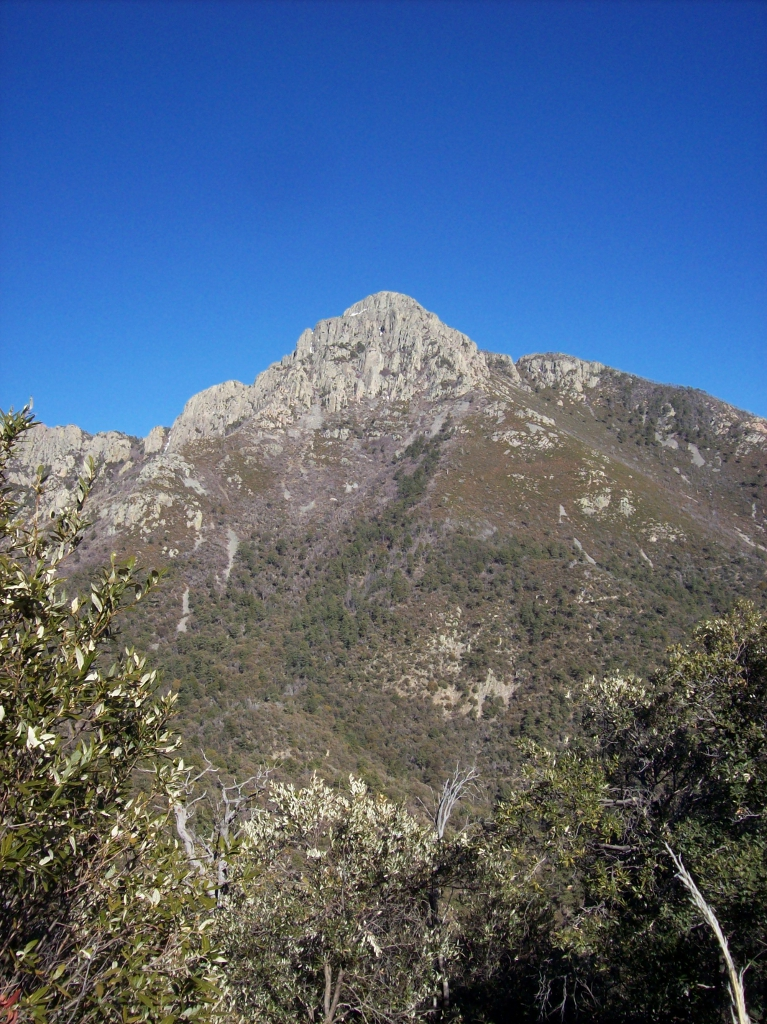
Mount Wrightson from Jack Mountain

== Fauna ==
Fauna on Mount Wrightson include birds such as the Mexican jay, elegant trogon, and ravens high up near the peak, Coues white-tailed deer, black bear, and (rarely) mountain lion.

== Hiking ==
The shortest route is the Old Baldy Trail, a steady climb of over 4,000 feet (1,200 m) over 5.4 miles (8.7 km) to the exposed summit. The Super Trail, also from the Madera Canyon trailhead, is not as steep but is far longer at 8.1 miles (13.0 km). These two trails intersect at Josephine Saddle (7,080 feet; 2,160 m) halfway to the peak, so hikers can choose one route for the lower path and one route for the upper.

There are several springs at different locations, including Bog Spring, Sprung Spring, Kent Spring, Armour Spring, Baldy Spring, McBeth Spring and Bellows Spring. Nonetheless, bring plenty of water as there are signs warning that the water is not potable due to giardia parasites. One should also be mindful of wildlife. It is a prime birding area and black bears are common. Two miles into the hike is a saddle which offers an easy day hike with dramatic views of this peak. It features a Boy Scout Memorial dedicated and maintained for three scouts who died in a storm on Mount Wrightson November 15, 1958. According to the sign, the plaque was erected by Boy Scout Troop 249 in remembrance of David Greenberg (age 12), Mike Early (age 16), and Michael J. Lanoue (age 13).

The final approach to the summit is north facing and may be impassable without special equipment during the winter due to ice.

The "Florida Fire" in 2005 burned a large expanse of the forest in this area, affecting much of this hike, especially the section between the Walker Basin trail and the Super Trail.

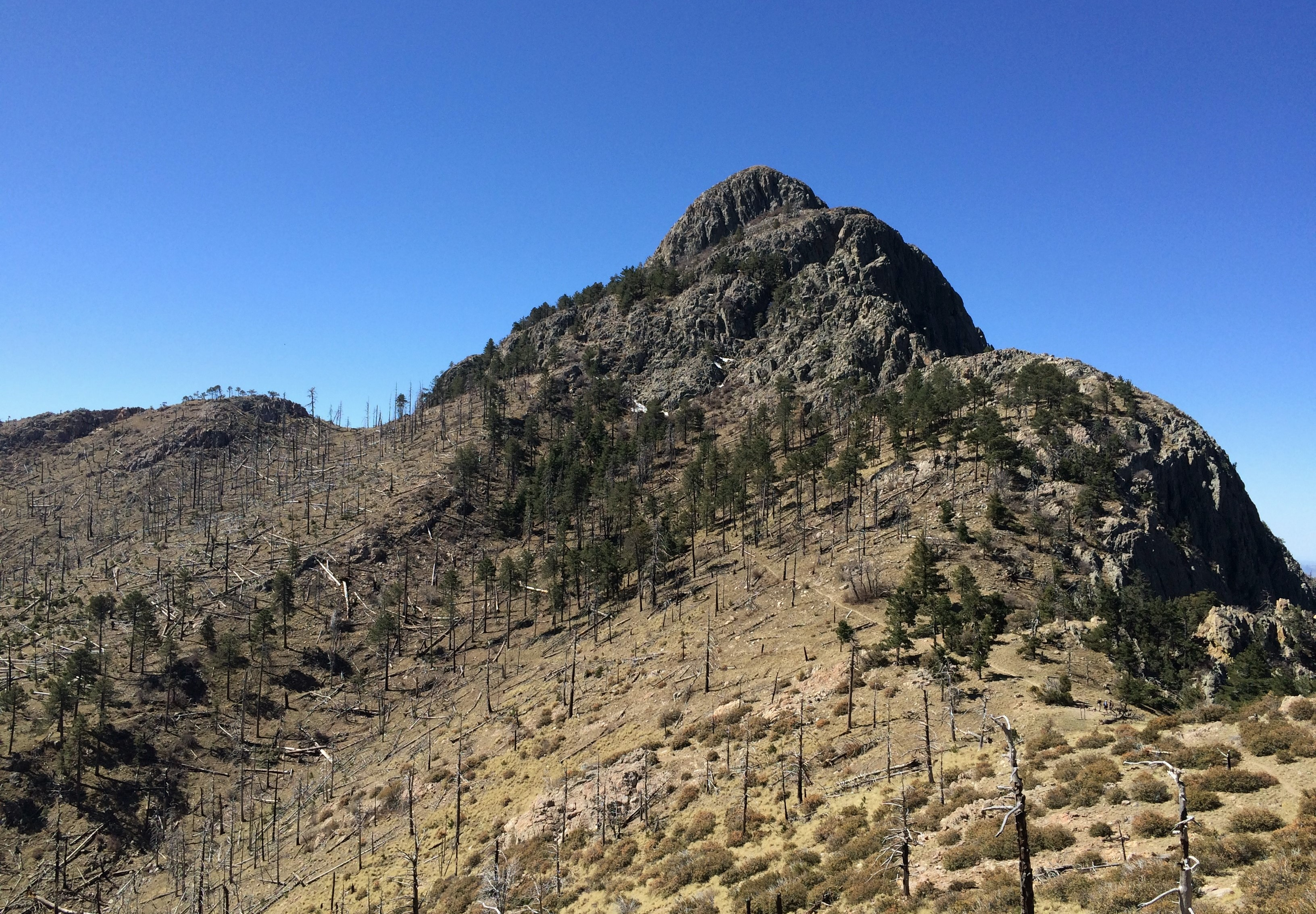
Looking up, close to the summit of Wrightson (April 2016)
