= Santa Rita Mountains =

Landform in Pima and Santa Cruz counties, Arizona

Coordinates: 31°43′23″N 110°52′49″W

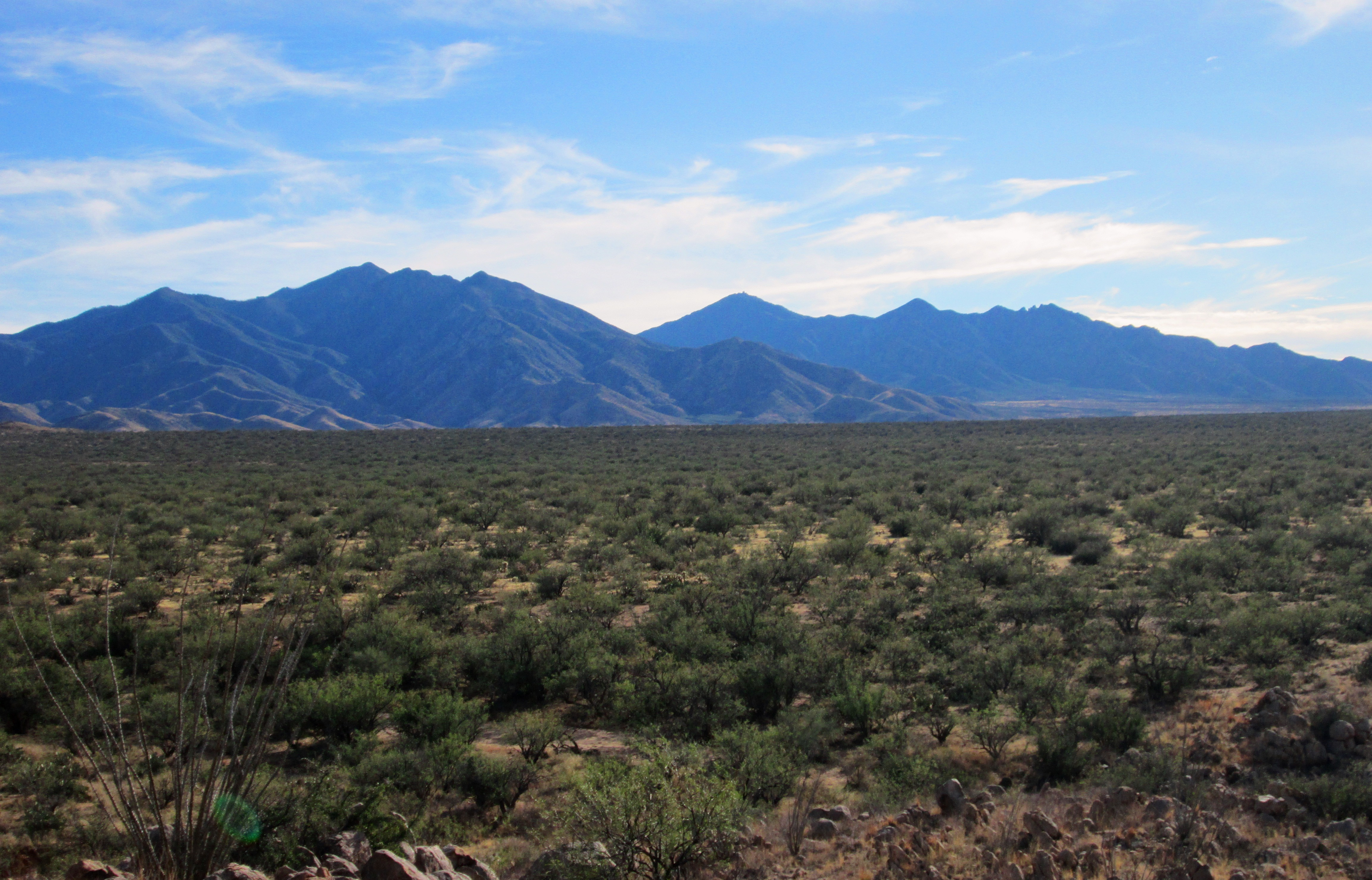
- View of the northern end of the Santa Ritas from the Santa Rita Experimental Range

Highest point
- Peak: Mount Wrightson
- Elevation: 9,453 ft (2,881 m)

Geography
- Location within Arizona
- Location: Pima and Santa Cruz County, Arizona
- Country: United States
- State: Arizona
- Region: Sonoran Desert
- District: Tucson, AZ
- Topo map(s): USGS Helvetia, AZ

The Santa Rita Mountains (O'odham: Ce:wi Doʼag), located about 40 miles (60 km) southeast of Tucson, Arizona, extend 26 miles (42 km) from north to south, then trending southeast. They merge again southeastwards into the Patagonia Mountains, trending northwest by southeast. The highest point in the range, and the highest point in the Tucson area, is Mount Wrightson, with an elevation of 9,453 feet (2,881 m), The range contains Madera Canyon, one of the world's premier birding areas. The Smithsonian Institution's Fred Lawrence Whipple Observatory is located on Mount Hopkins. The range is one of the Madrean sky islands.

The Santa Rita Mountains are mostly within the Coronado National Forest. Prior to 1908 they were the principal component of Santa Rita National Forest, which was combined with other small forest tracts to form Coronado. Much of the range lies within the Mt. Wrightson Wilderness, managed by the Coronado National Forest. The Santa Rita Mountains were severely burned in July 2005 in the Florida Fire.

On the western side of the northern Santa Rita Mountains, a large cliff face of white marble is visible from the Green Valley and Sahuarita areas. This "white scar" reminded early Spanish missionaries of Saint Rita of Cascia (1381–1457), an Italian nun, who is often depicted with a small wound on her forehead. The mountain range was consequently named after her.

Other mountain ranges surrounding the Tucson valley include the Santa Catalina Mountains, the Rincon Mountains, the Tucson Mountains, and the Tortolita Mountains.

== Rosemont mine ==
A large porphyry copper deposit has been identified near the old Helvetia mining district on the north flank of the range. The proposed Rosemont Copper mine would be an open pit operation located in the Santa Ritas about 2 miles (3 km) west of mile marker 44 on Arizona State Route 83.

== Jaguars ==
The Santa Rita Mountains were the temporary home range of "El Jefe," an adult male jaguar first identified in 2011. He has not been seen in the Santa Rita Mountains since 2015. El Jefe was recently identified by his distinctive markings in Mexico.

== Gallery ==
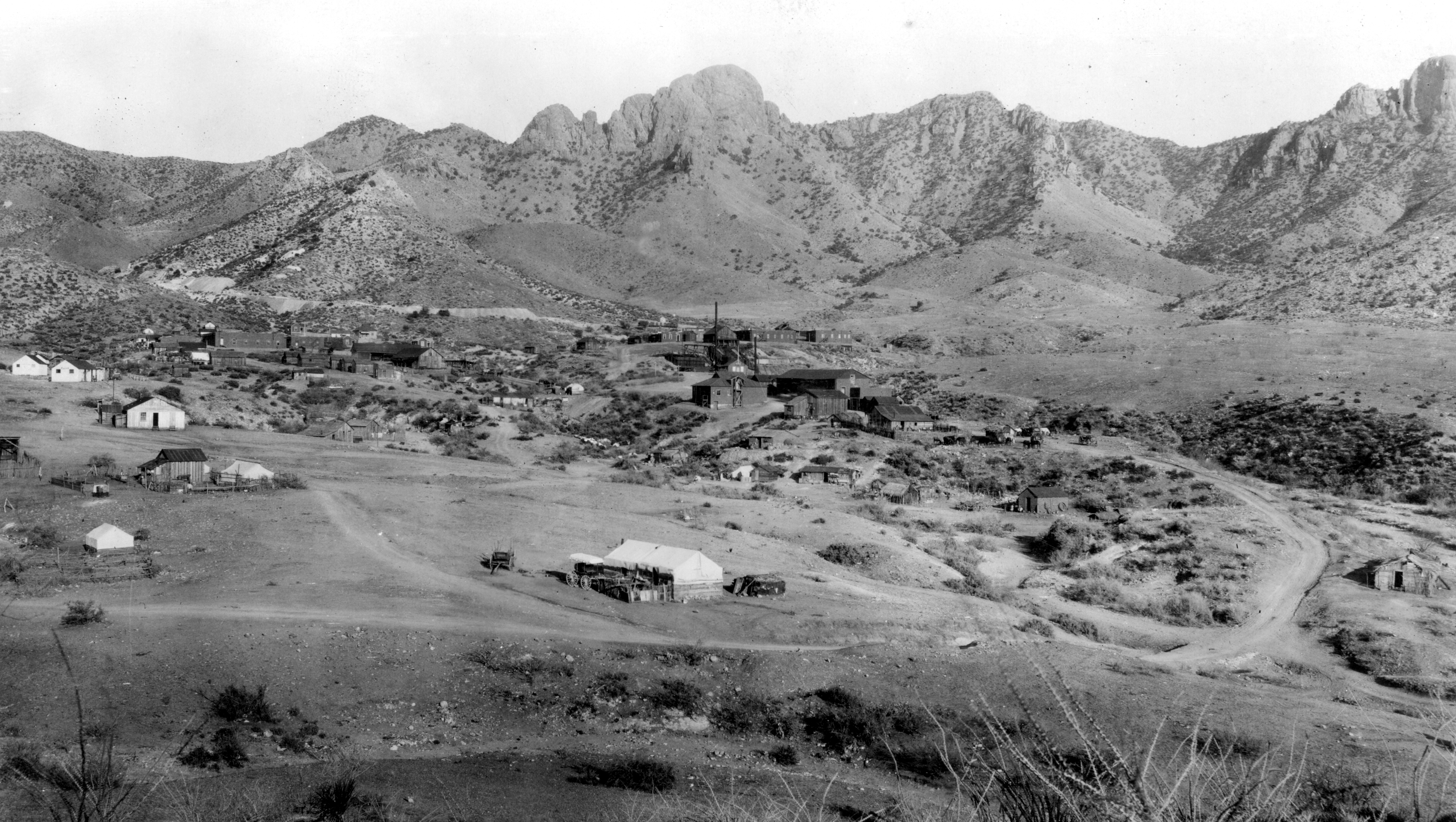
Helvetia, Arizona, in 1909

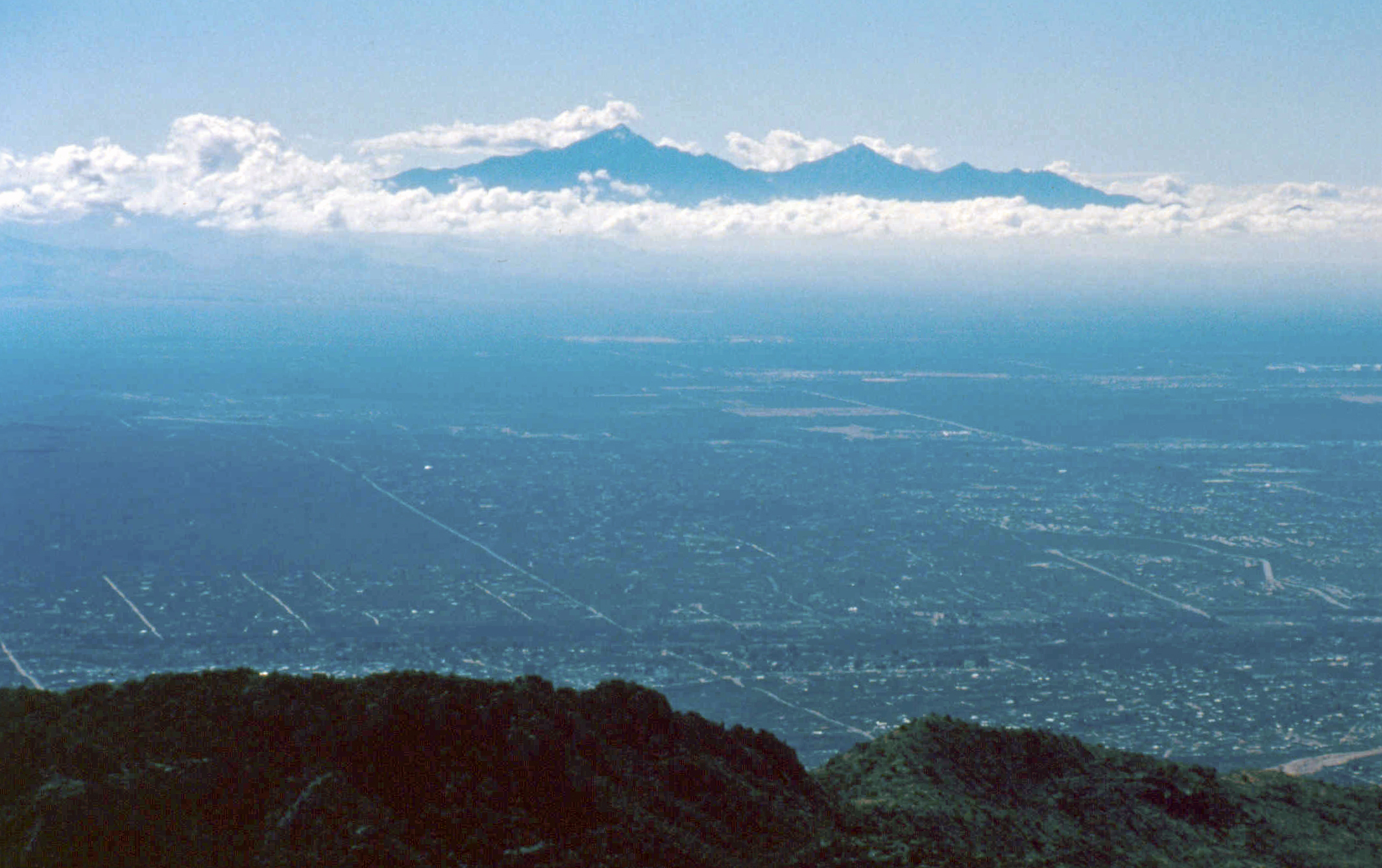
View of the Santa Ritas from the Catalina Mountains

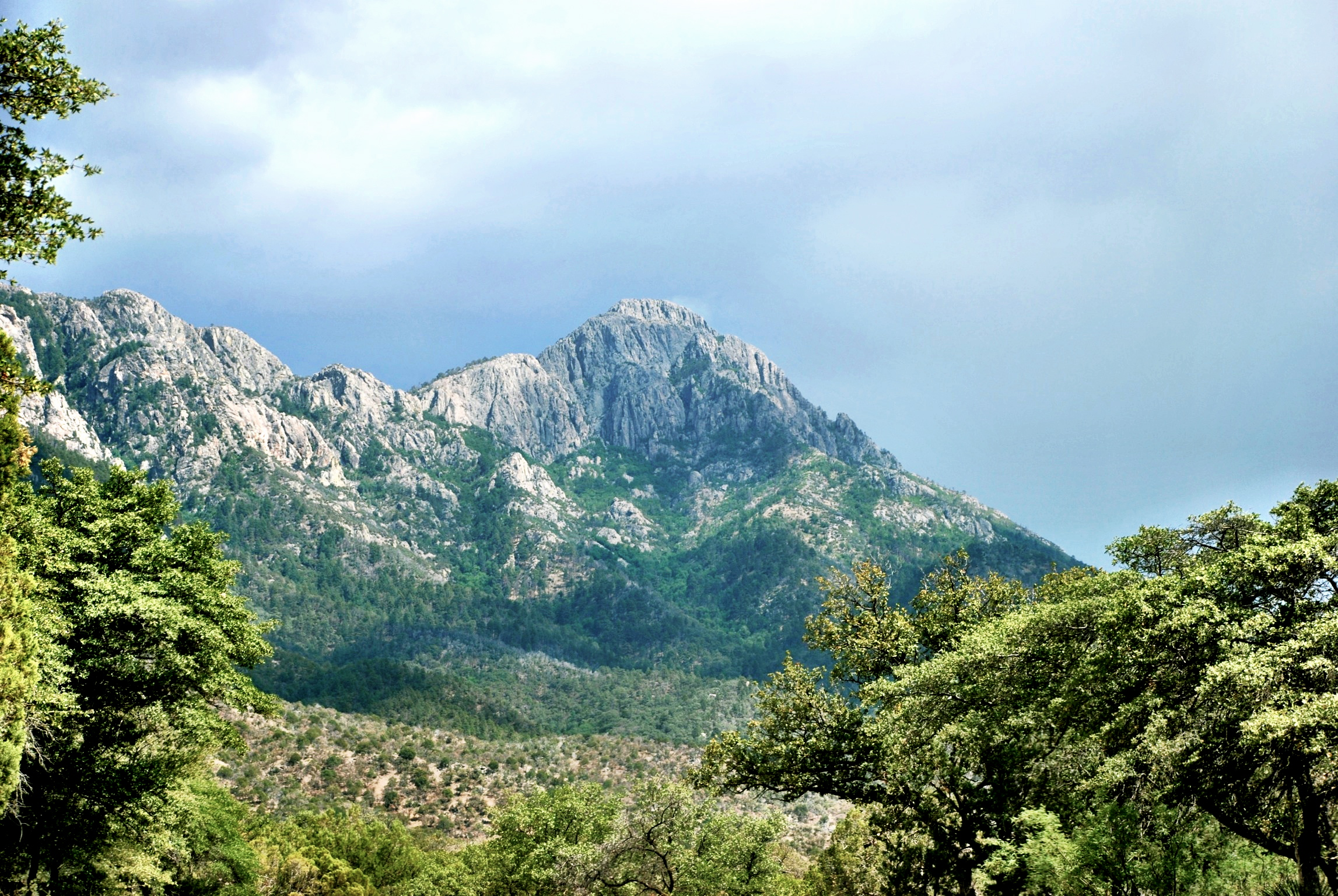
Mount Wrightson from Madera Canyon in 2012

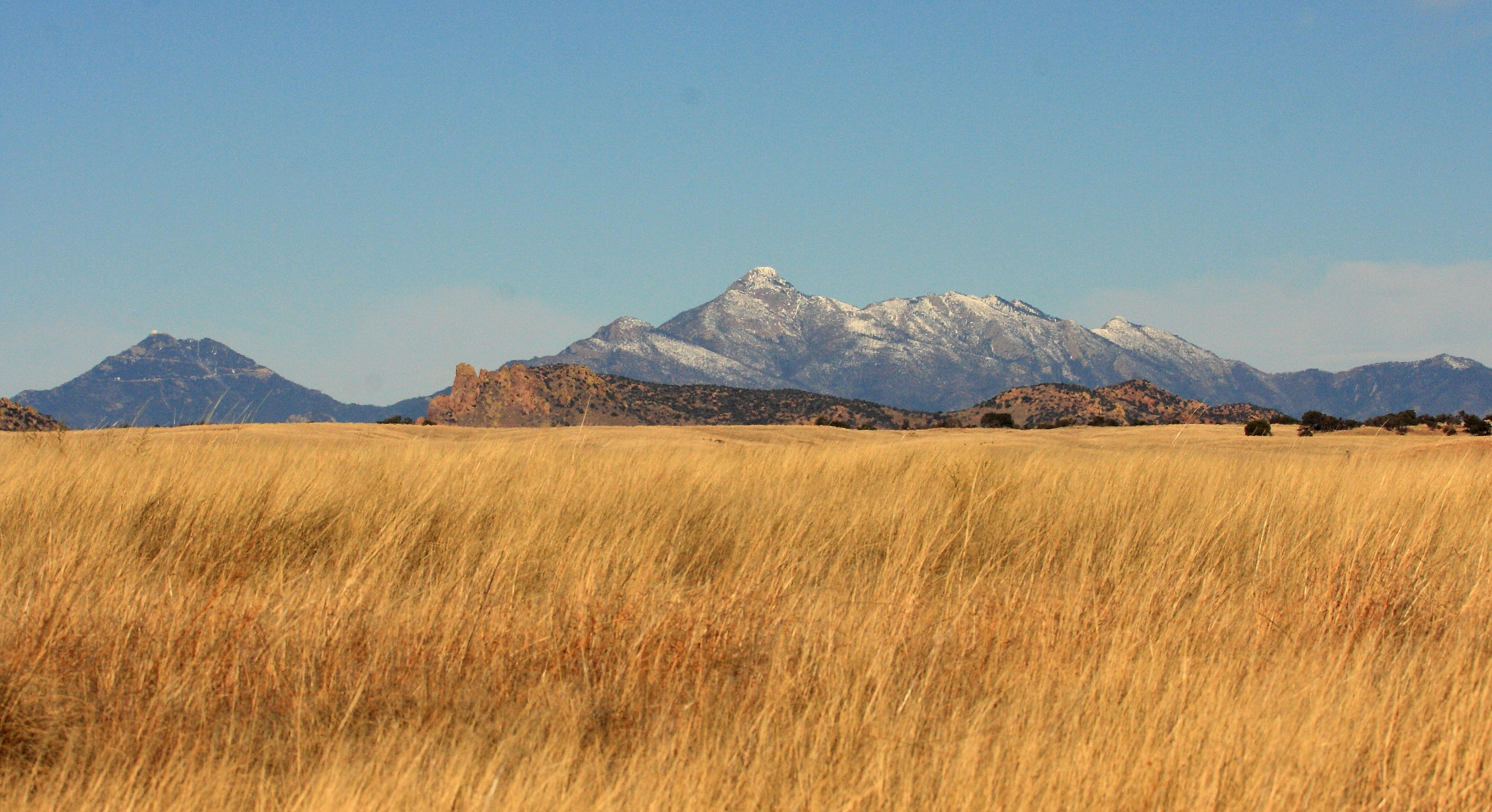
The San Rafael Valley with the Santa Ritas in the background

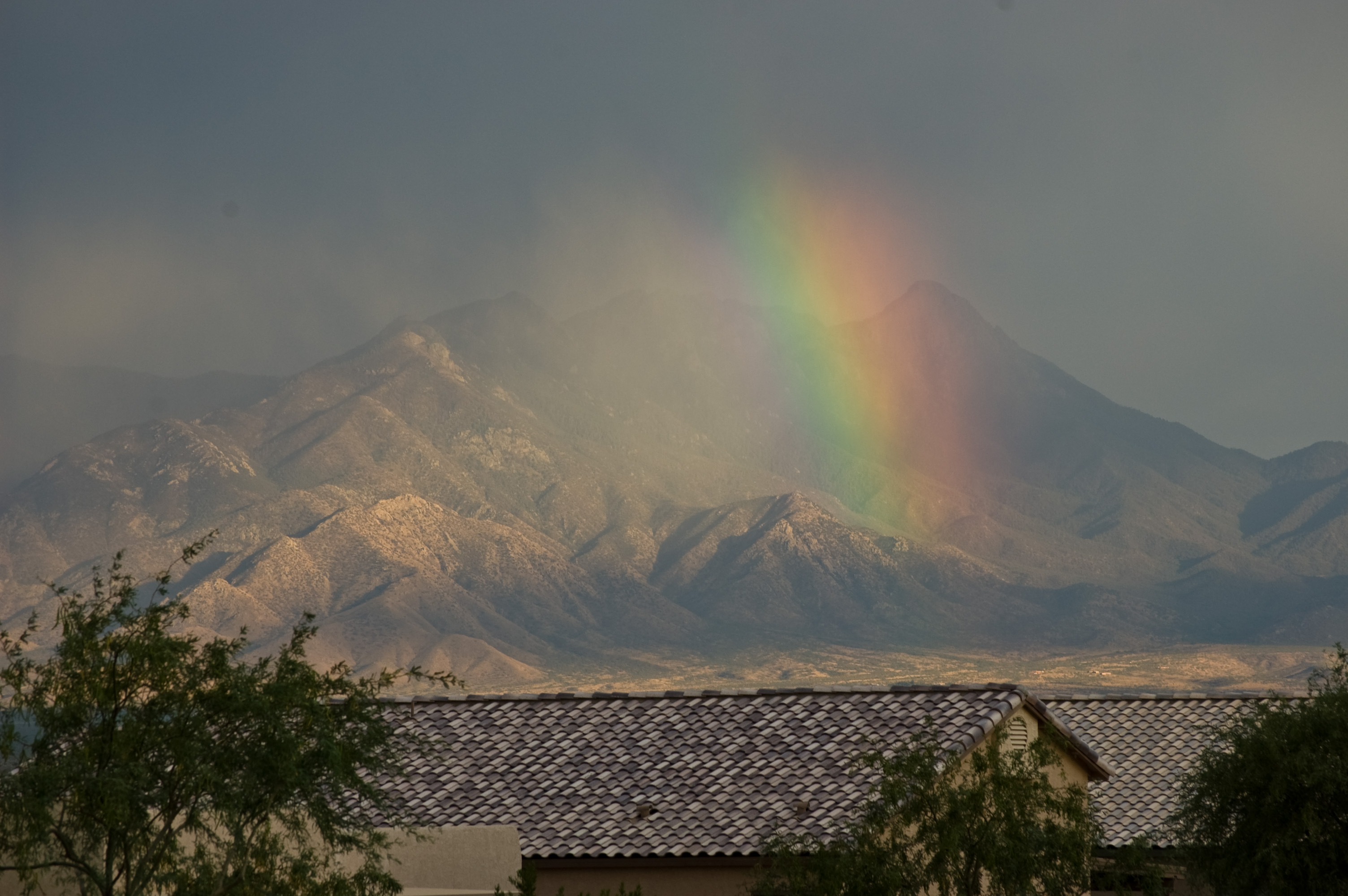
A rainbow and the Santa Ritas

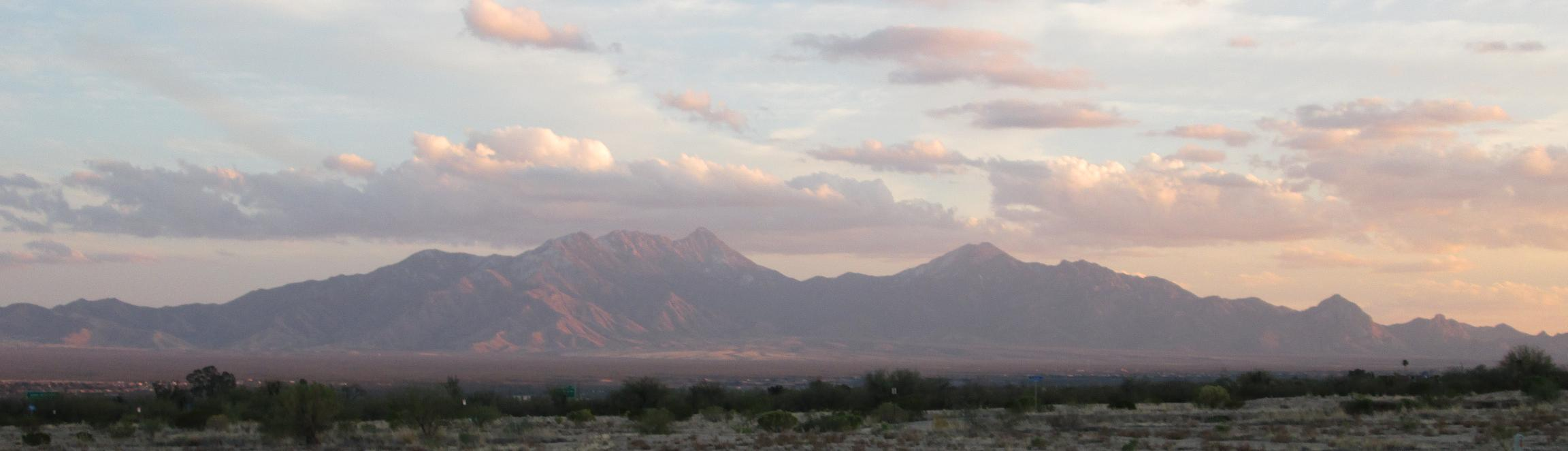
The southern end of the Santa Ritas from Sahuarita, Arizona

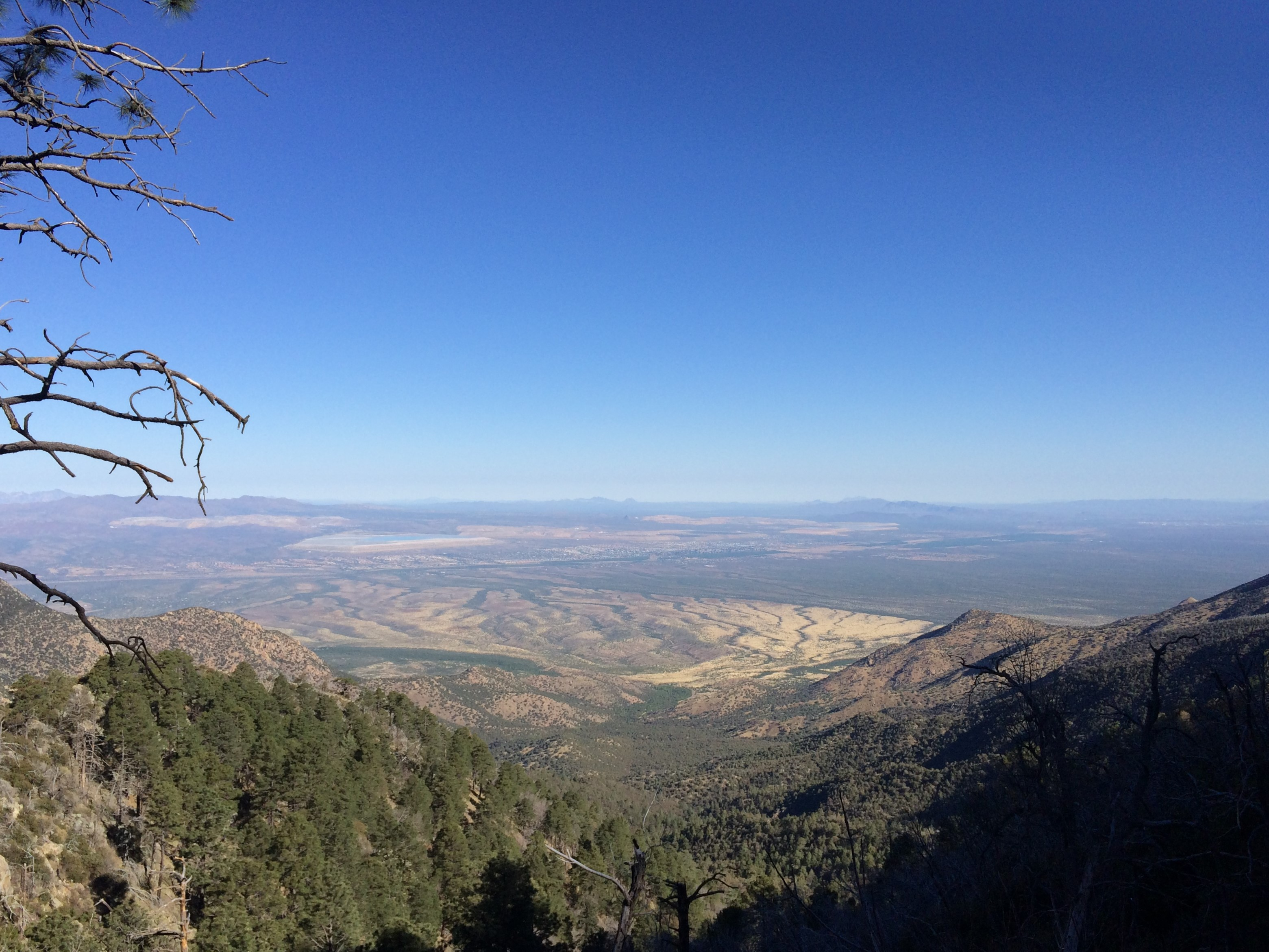
Overlooking Green Valley, Arizona from the Santa Rita mountains

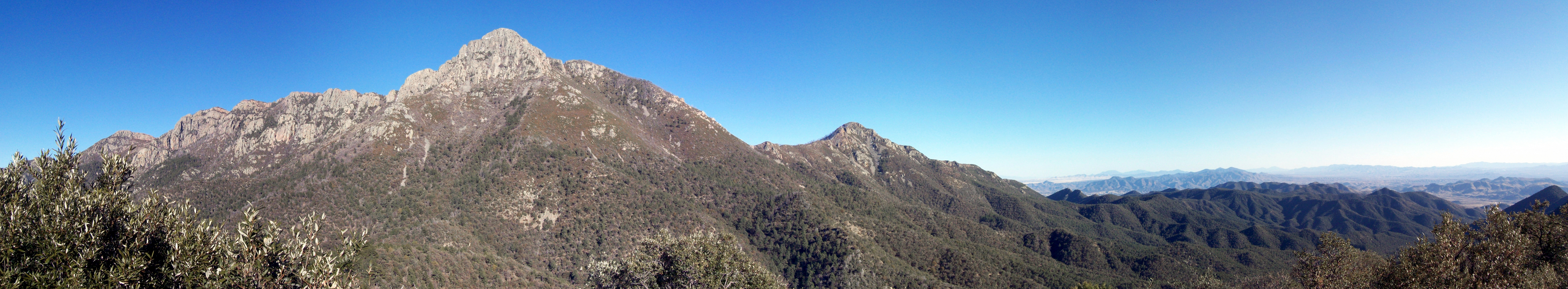
The eastern and southern Santa Rita Mountains photographed from the summit of Jack Mountain. Mount Wrightson, the peak left of center, is the highest point in the range.

== See also ==
- List of mountain ranges of Arizona
- Empire Ranch
- Madera Canyon (Arizona)
- Battle of Fort Buchanan
- Larcena Pennington Page
