= List of places in Arizona (H) =

This is a list of cities, towns, unincorporated communities, counties, and other places in the U.S. state of Arizona, which start with the letter H. This list is derived from the Geographic Names Information System, which has numerous errors, so it also includes many ghost towns and historical places that are not necessarily communities or actual populated places. This list also includes information on the number and names of counties in which the place lies, its lower and upper ZIP code bounds, if applicable, its U.S. Geological Survey (USGS) reference number(s) (called the GNIS), class as designated by the USGS, and incorporated community located in (if applicable).

== H ==
Name of place	Number of counties	Principal county	GNIS #(s)	Class	Located in	ZIP code	
Name of place	Number of counties	Principal county	GNIS #(s)	Class	Located in	Lower	Upper
Hackberry	1	Mohave County	2582794	CDP		86411	
Haigler Creek	1	Gila County	2582795	CDP			
Haivana Nakya	1	Pima County	2582796	CDP			
Haivan Vaya	1	Pima County	24446	Populated Place			
Hali Murk	1	Pima County	24447	Populated Place			
Hano	1	Navajo County	5545	Populated Place	First Mesa	86042	
Happy Jack	1	Coconino County	29736	Populated Place		86024	
Harcuvar	1	La Paz County	5553	Populated Place	Salome	85348	
Hard Rock	1	Navajo County	2582797	CDP			
Hard Rocks	1	Navajo County	24449	Populated Place		86039	
Harqua	1	Maricopa County	24882	Populated Place			
Harshaw	1	Santa Cruz County	29768	Populated Place		85624	
Hashan Chuchg	1	Pima County	24451	Populated Place			
Hassayampa	1	Maricopa County	24452	Populated Place		85343	
Havasupai Indian Reservation	1	Coconino County	45638	Civil (Indian reservation)		86435	
Hayden	2	Gila County	2412739	Civil (Town)		85235	
Heaton	1	Pinal County	24456	Populated Place	Maricopa		
Heber	1	Navajo County	29842	Populated Place		85928	
Heber-Overgaard	1	Navajo County	2408368	CDP			
Hecla	1	Yavapai County	42742	Populated Place			
Helvetia	1	Pima County	29884	Populated Place			
Hereford	1	Cochise County	5733	Populated Place		85615	
Hickiwan	1	Pima County	5752	Populated Place			
Hidden Springs Mission	1	Coconino County	25251	Populated Place		86020	
Highjinks	1	Pinal County	29970	Populated Place	Oracle		
Highland Park (Cochise County)	1	Cochise County	5807	Populated Place			
Highland Park (Yavapai County)	1	Yavapai County	38504	Populated Place			
Higley	1	Maricopa County	5816	Populated Place	Gilbert	85236	
Hillside	1	Yavapai County	24459	Populated Place		86301	
Hilltop	1	Cochise County	5831	Populated Place		85632	
Hoa Murk	1	Pima County	24460	Populated Place			
Hoi Oidak	1	Pima County	24461	Populated Place			
Holbrook	1	Navajo County	2410773	Civil (City)		86025	
Hondah	1	Navajo County	2582798	CDP			
Hooper	1	Yavapai County	30097	Populated Place			
Hope	1	La Paz County	24462	Populated Place	Vicksburg		
Hopi Indian Reservation	2	Navajo County	24001	Civil (Indian Reservation)		86039	
Horn	1	Yuma County	24463	Populated Place		85352	
Hotevilla-Bacavi	1	Navajo County	2408402	CDP			
Houck	1	Apache County	2408403	CDP		86506	
Huachuca City	1	Cochise County	2412775	Civil (Town)		85616	
Hualapai Indian Reservation	3	Coconino County	45633	Civil (Indian Reservation)		86334	
Huk Ovi	1	Navajo County	24466	Populated Place			
Humboldt	1	Yavapai County	30280	Populated Place	Dewey-Humboldt	86329	
Humbug	1	Yavapai County	24467	Populated Place			
Hunt	1	Apache County	24468	Populated Place		85924	
Hunter Creek	1	Gila County	2582799	CDP		86511	
Hunters Point	1	Apache County	25266	Populated Place		86511	
Hyder	1	Yuma County	6155	Populated Place		85352	
