= List of places in Arizona (U–V) =

This is a list of cities, towns, unincorporated communities, counties, and other places in the U.S. state of Arizona, which start with the letters U or V. This list is derived from the Geographic Names Information System, which has numerous errors, so it also includes many ghost towns and historical places that are not necessarily communities or actual populated places. This list also includes information on the number and names of counties in which the place lies, its lower and upper ZIP code bounds, if applicable, its U.S. Geological Survey (USGS) reference number(s) (called the GNIS), class as designated by the USGS, and incorporated community located in (if applicable).

== U ==
Name of place	Number of counties	Principal county	GNIS #(s)	Class	Located in	ZIP code	
Name of place	Number of counties	Principal county	GNIS #(s)	Class	Located in	Lower	Upper
Uhs Kug	1	Pima County	24668	Populated Place			
Upper Wheatfields	1	Apache County	13134	Populated Place		86507	
Utting	1	La Paz County	2582885	CDP		85348	

== V ==
Name of place	Number of counties	Principal county	GNIS #(s)	Class	Located in	ZIP code	
Name of place	Number of counties	Principal county	GNIS #(s)	Class	Located in	Lower	Upper
Vail	1	Pima County	2409387	CDP		85641	
Vainom Kug	1	Pima County	24670	Populated Place			
Vaiva Vo	1	Pinal County	2582886	CDP		85634	
Vakamok	1	Pima County	24671	Populated Place			
Valencia West	1	Pima County	2409391	CDP			
Valentine	1	Mohave County	2582887	CDP		86437	
Valle	1	Coconino County	2582888	CDP			
Valle Vista	1	MohaveCounty	2582889	CDP			
Valley Farms	1	Maricopa County	13168	Populated Place			
Vamori	1	Pima County	13182	Populated Place		85634	
Vanar	1	Cochise County	24673	Populated Place			
Vaya Chin	1	Pima County	13199	Populated Place		85634	
Venezia	1	Yavapai County	35758	Populated Place			
Ventana	1	Pima County	2582890	CDP		85634	
Verde Village	1	Pima County	2407671	CDP		86326	
Vernon	1	Apache County	2582891	CDP		85940	
Viason Chin	1	Pima County	24674	Populated Place			
Vicksburg	1	La Paz County	2582892	CDP		85348	
Village of Oak Creek	1	YavapaiCounty	2407842	CDP			
Vopolo Havoka	1	Pima County	24676	Populated Place			
