= Huerfano Butte (Arizona) =

Summit in Pima County, Arizona, US

- Huerfano Butte
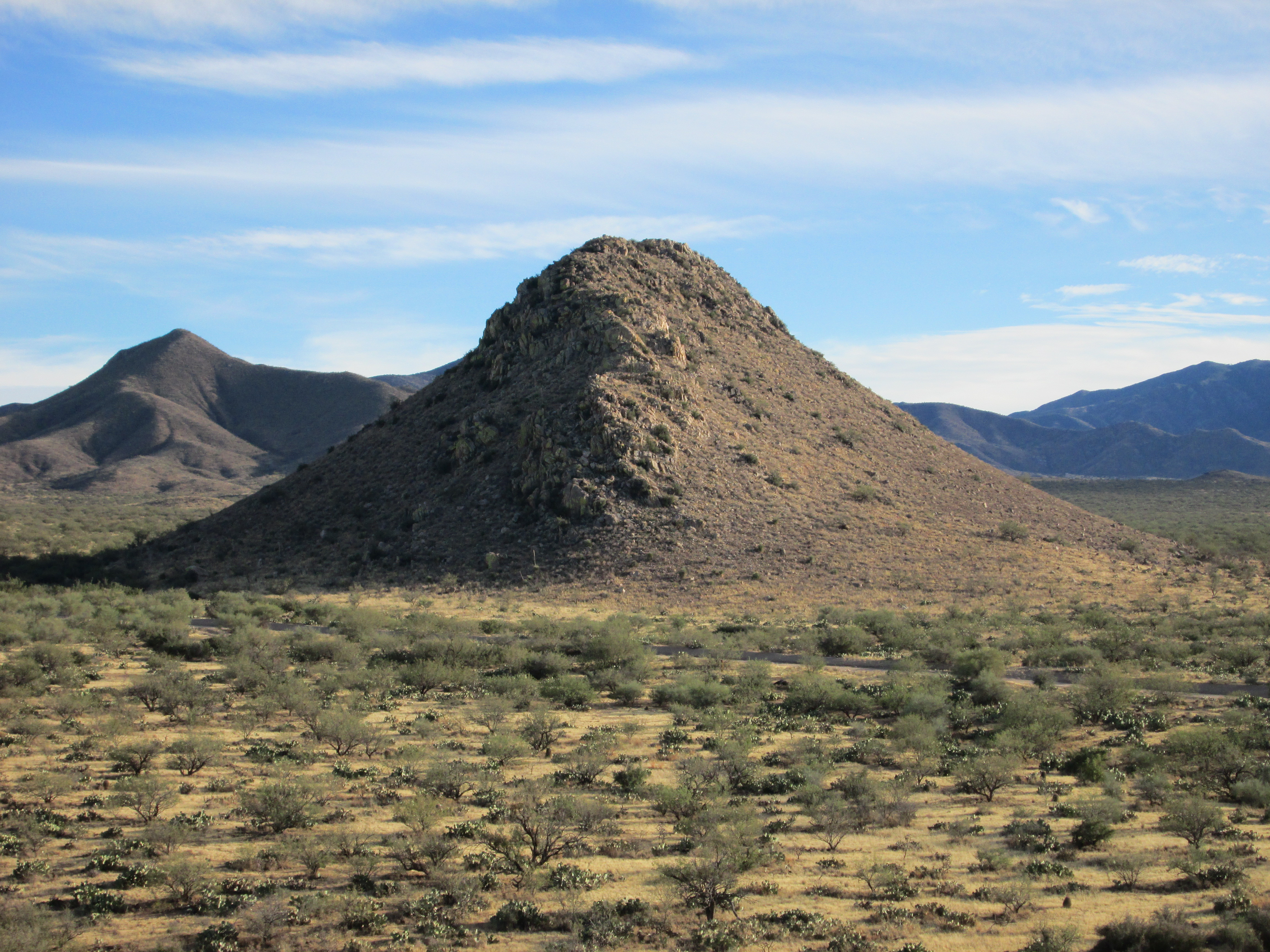
- Huerfano Butte from the northwest.

Highest point
- Prominence: 3,992 ft (1,217 m)
- Coordinates: 31°51′32″N 110°49′57″WGNIS data

Geography
- Location within Arizona
- Location: Tucson, Arizona
- Parent range: Santa Rita Mountains

Huerfano Butte (English: "Orphan Butte") is a small rocky butte located on the western flank of the Santa Rita Mountains in southeastern Pima County, Arizona. With an elevation of 3,992 ft (1,217 m), Huerfano Butte is one of the dominant landmarks in the 52,000-acre (21,000 ha) Santa Rita Experimental Range, as well as an important prehistoric archaeological site.

== Archaeology ==
Huerfano Butte and the surrounding area were utilized by the Hohokam as early as circa 1100 CE. Shallow bedrock forces ground water to surface in a small pool located in a wash on the south side of the butte. Exposed outcrops of granite on either side of the wash have about fifty bedrock mortars, at least two small bedrock metates, and numerous smaller cupules. Along the same wash is a vertical stone surface with approximately two dozen weathered pictographs painted in red hematite. The pictographs include human and animal life forms, as well as concentric circles, all of which are coated in "desert varnish."

In 1965, Huerfano Butte gained public notoriety when a young girl discovered an extensive prehistoric jewelry cache while on a picnic with her family. While exploring cracks and crevices on the butte, the young girl discovered a small pottery jar filled with about 1,500 turquoise and glycimeris shell beads and pendants. The pottery jar and lid containing the jewelry were turned over to the Arizona State Museum upon discovery, and were dated to approximately 1100 CE. The pottery was identified as Gila plainware from the Rincon phase.

Today, Huerfano Butte is only open to those with permission, in order to help protect the site's cultural resources.

== Gallery ==
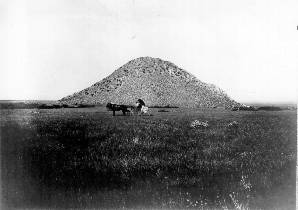
Huerfano Butte from the east in 1902. Notice the grassland, which has since turned into a desert of mesquite, prickly pear and cholla.

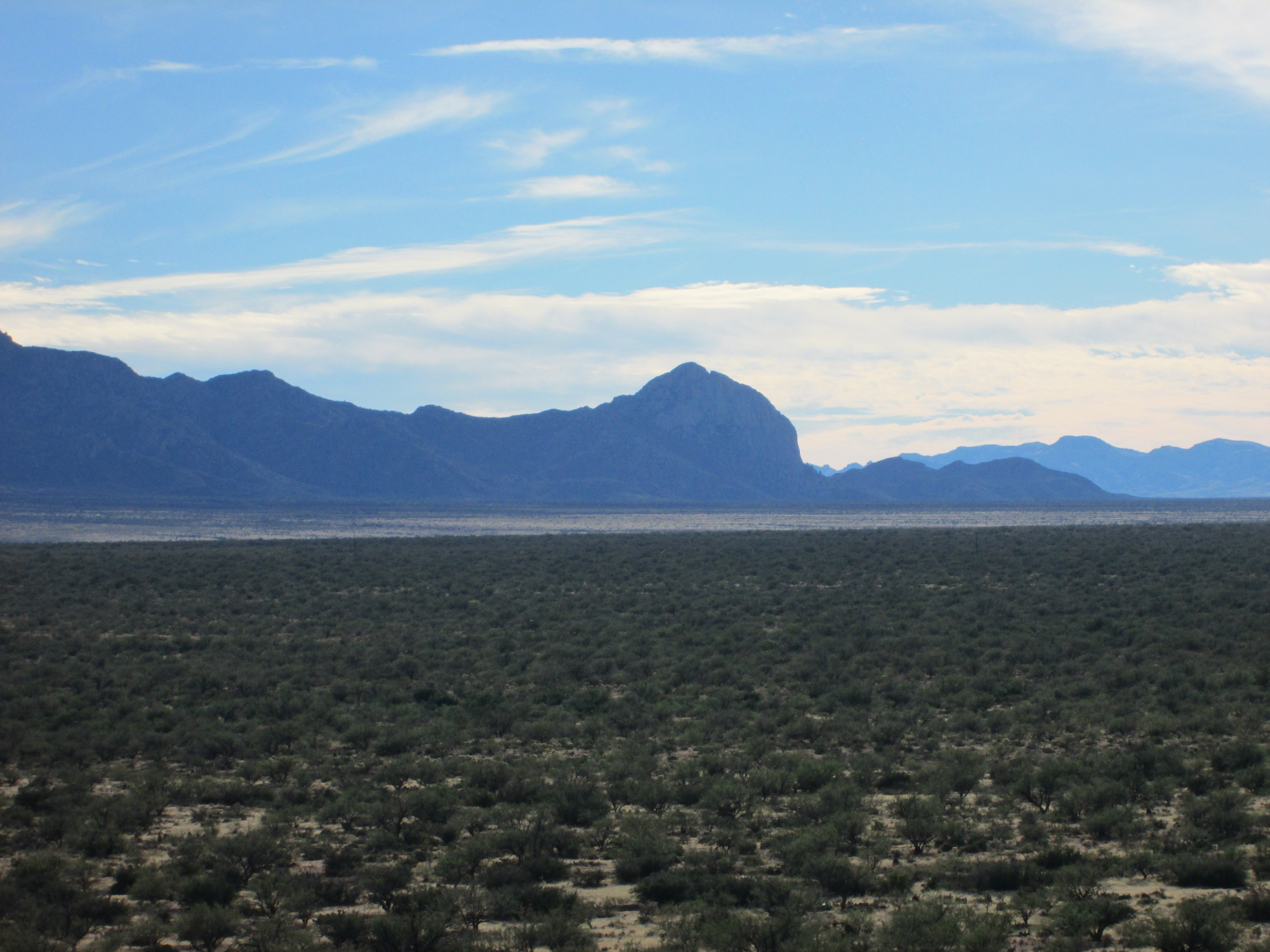
View of the Sonoran Desert from Huerfano Butte. The southern end of the Santa Rita Mountains can be seen in the background.

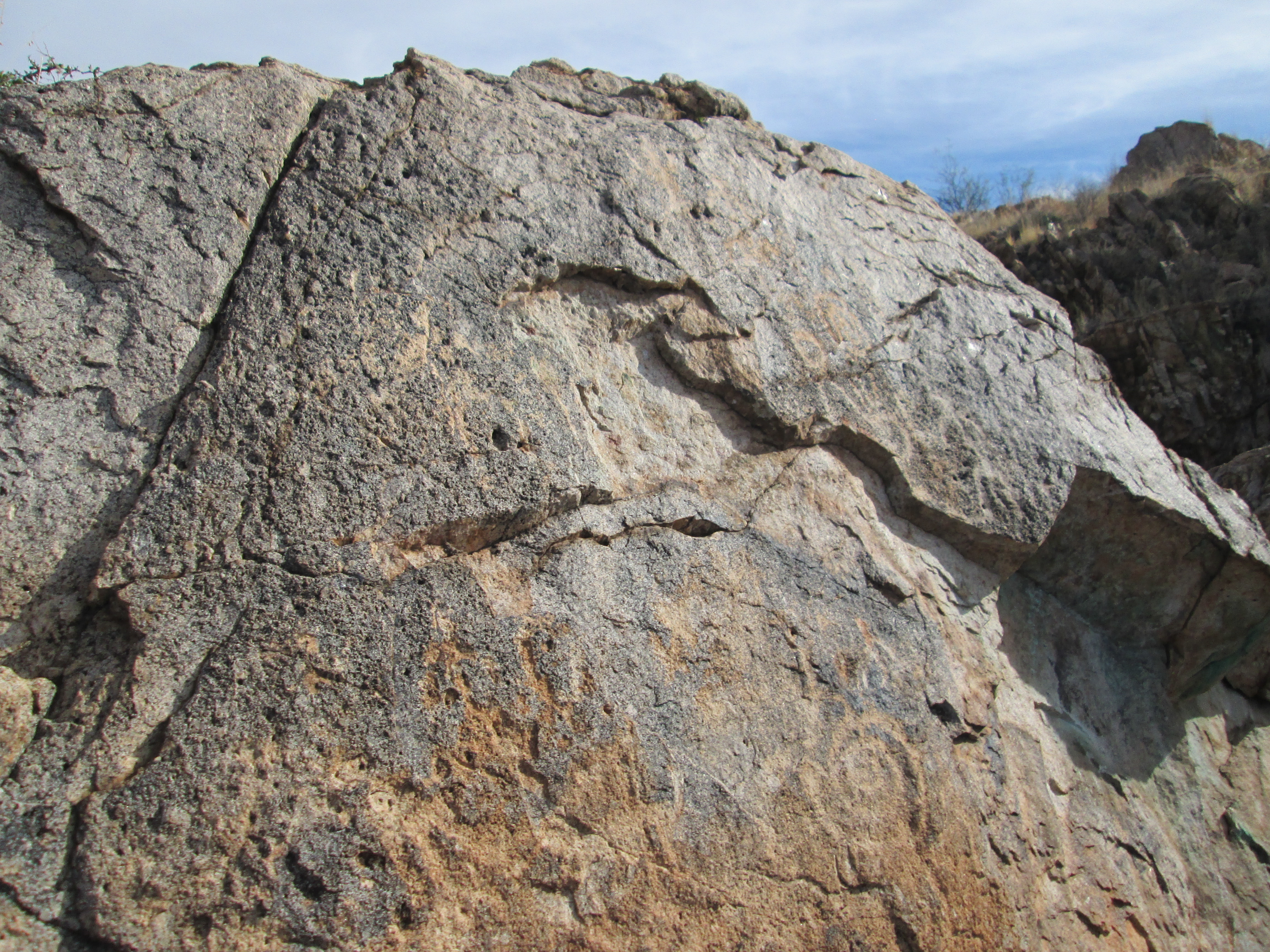
Pictographs

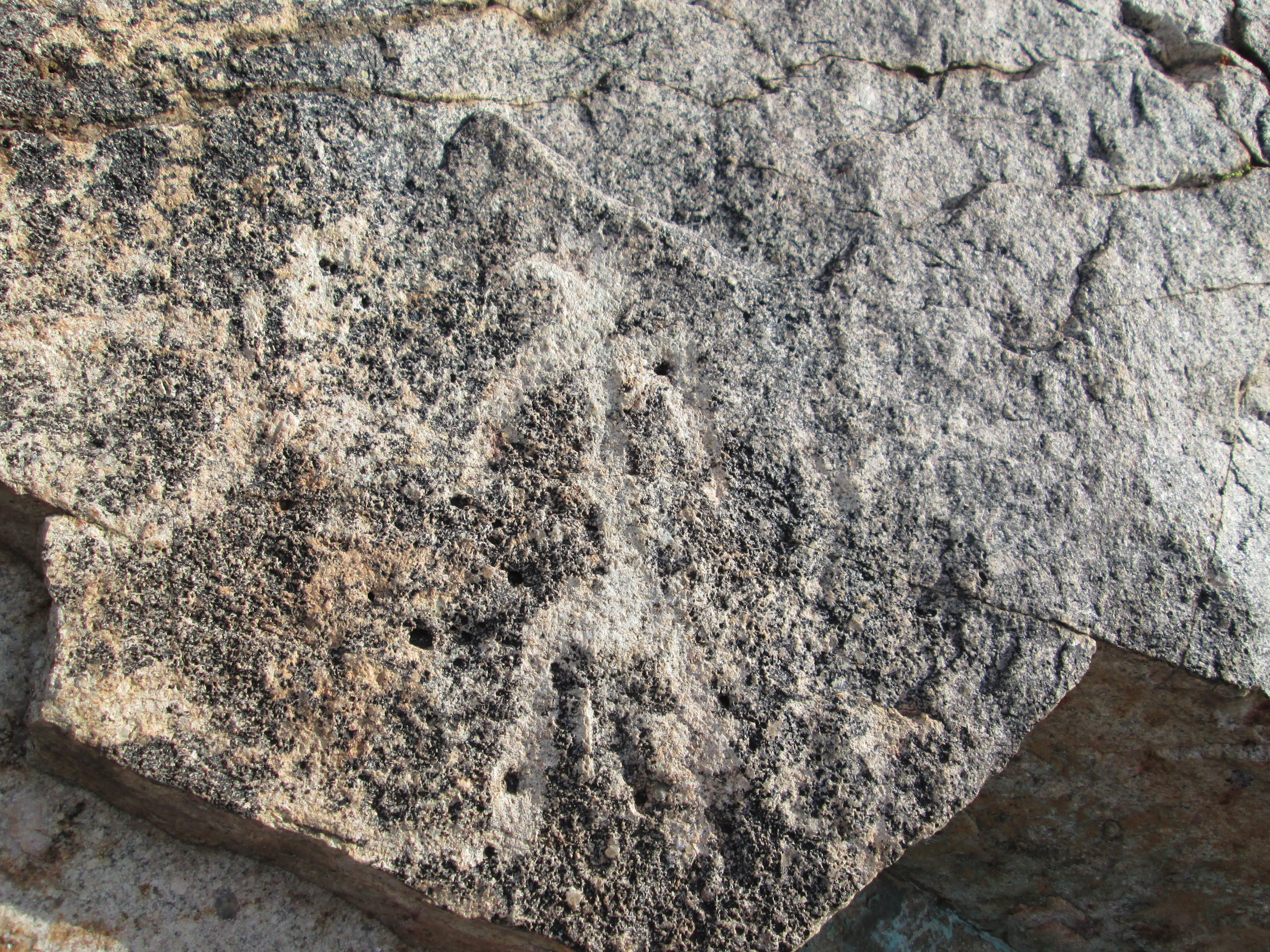
Close up view of pictographs

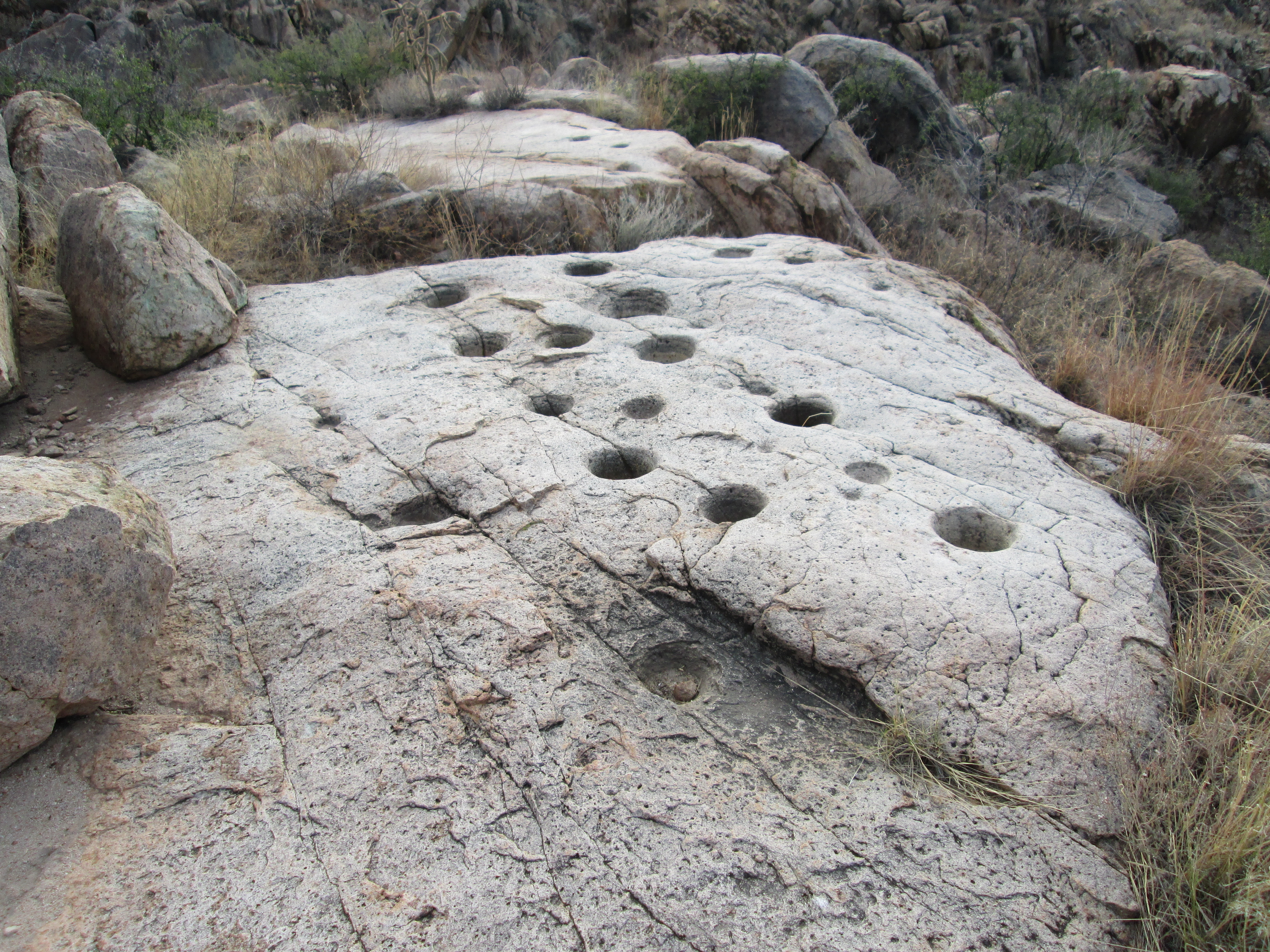
Bedrock mortars

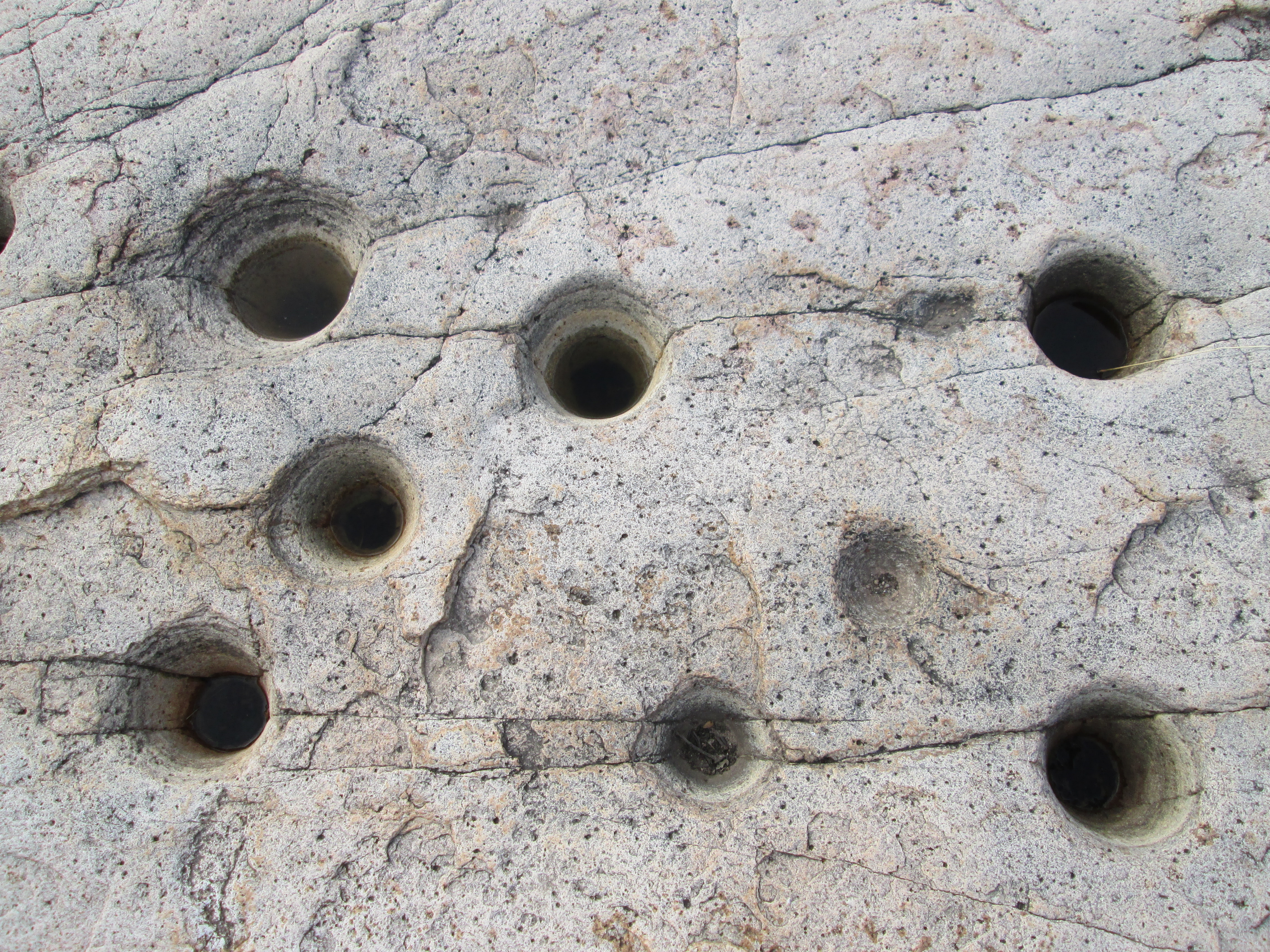
Close up view of bedrock mortars

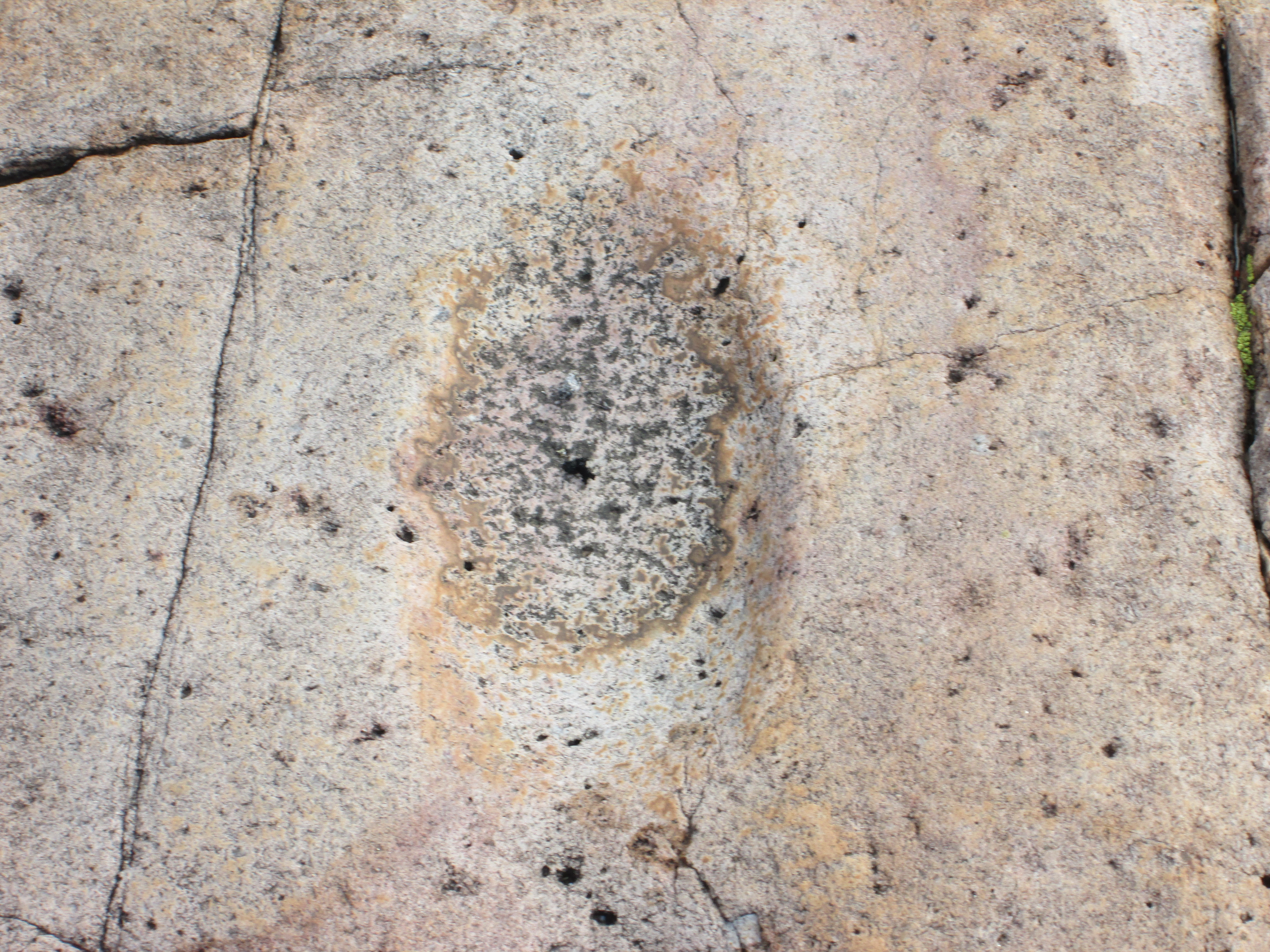
Bedrock metate

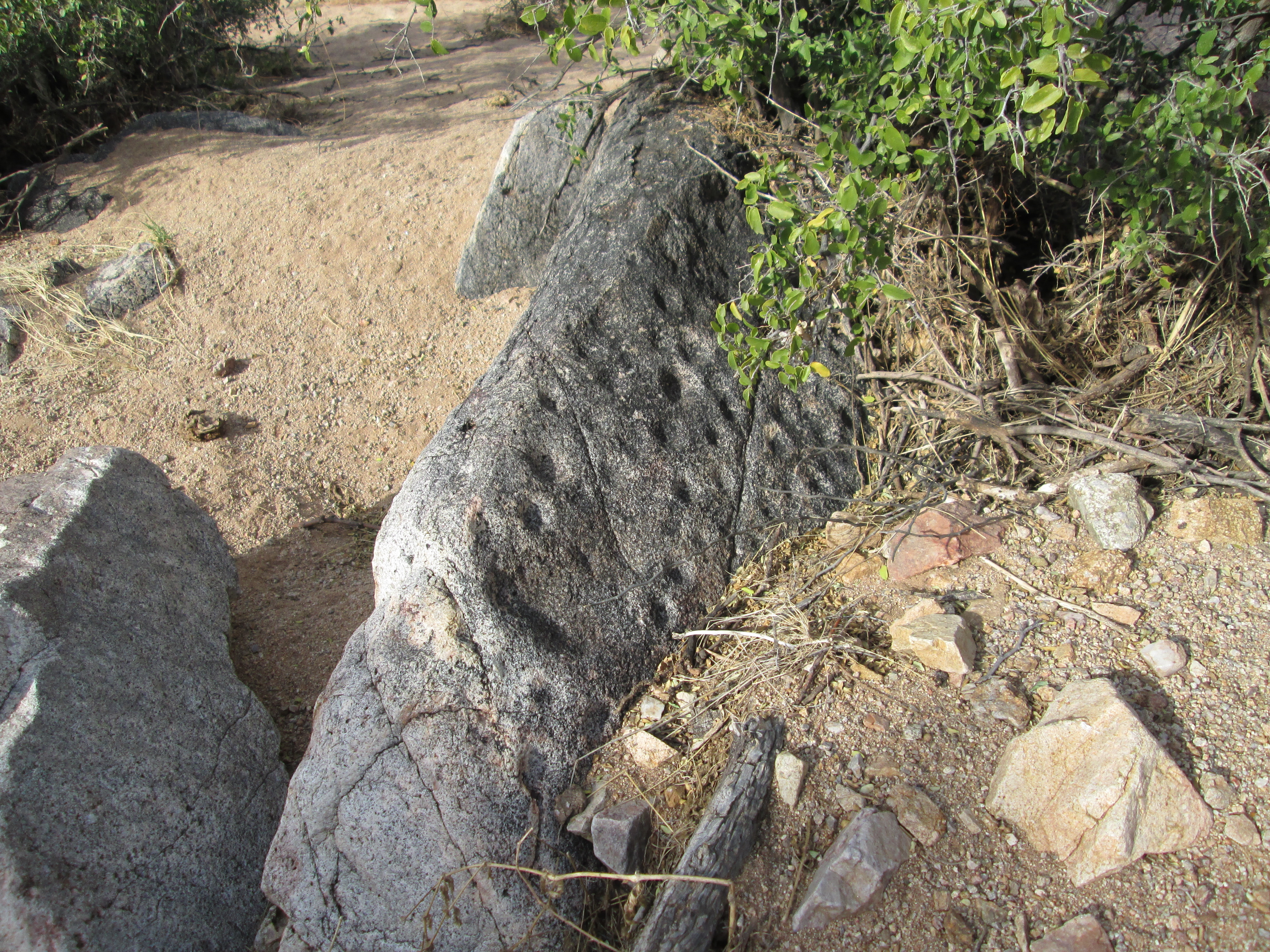
Cupule slab

== See also ==
- Larcena Pennington Page
- Helvetia, Arizona
