= Kokuli =

Kokuli may refer to:

- Kokuli, Arizona, an historical name for Hickiwan, Arizona, a populated place in Pima County
- Kokuli, Greece, the Turkish eponym for Koukouli, Ioannina, a village of the Zagori region
