= Bedrock mortar =

Anthropogenic rock depression used for grinding

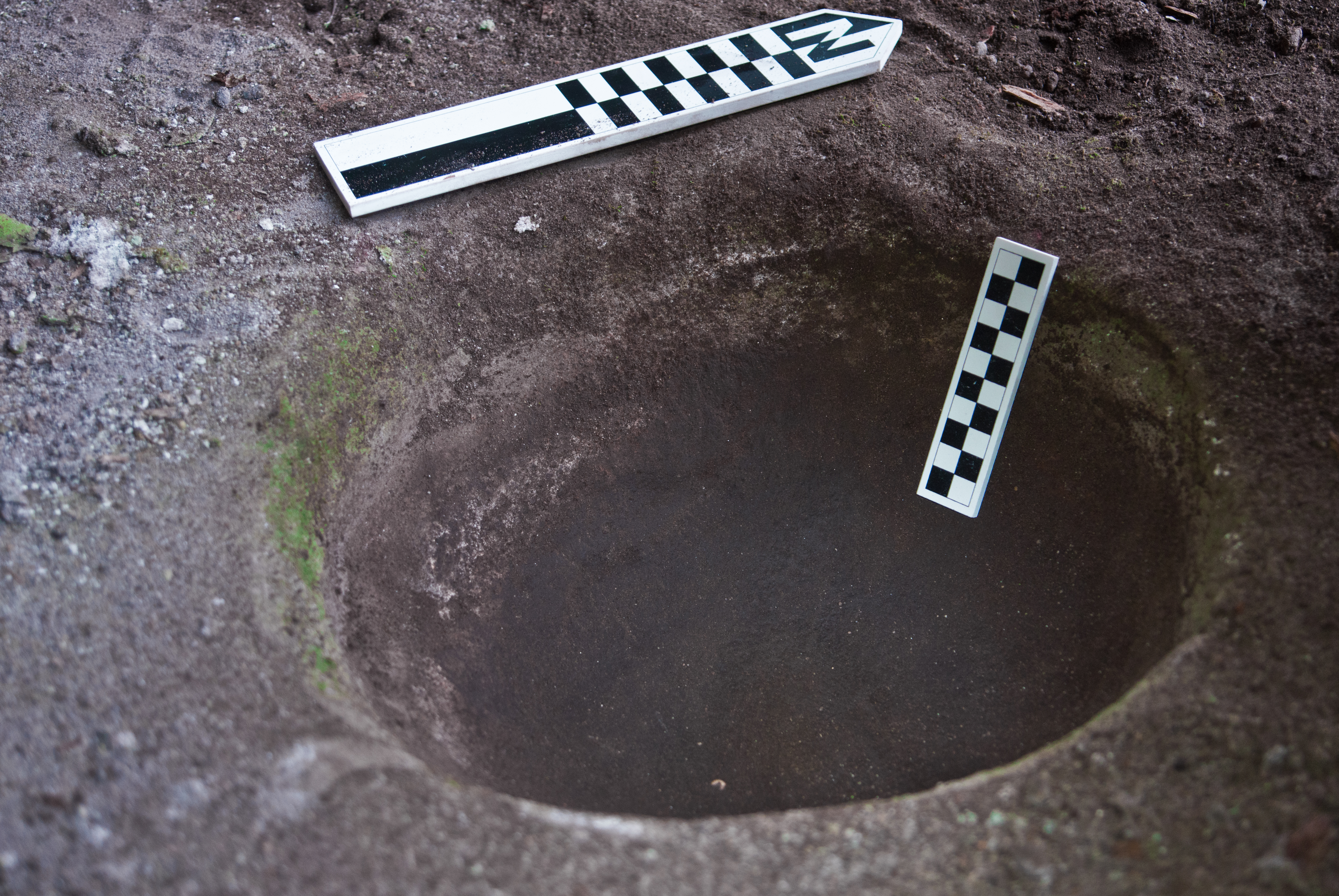
BRM in a rock shelter on the Upper Cumberland Plateau.

A bedrock mortar (BRM) is an anthropogenic circular depression in a rock outcrop or naturally occurring slab, used by people in the past for food preparation such as grinding or cold-water leaching of grain, acorns or other food products. There are often a cluster of a considerable number of such holes in proximity indicating that people gathered in groups to conduct food grinding in prehistoric cultures. Correspondingly the alternative name gossip stone is sometimes applied, indicating the social context of the food grinding activity. Typical dimensions of the circular indentations are approximately 12 centimeters (4.7 inch) in diameter by 10 centimeters (3.9 inches) deep, although a considerable range of depths of the cavities have been documented. The bedrock mortar has been identified in a number of world regions, but has been particularly intensely documented in the Americas. An alternative term for the bedrock mortar site is bedrock milling station.

== Bedrock metate ==
A bedrock mortar should not be confused with a bedrock metate, which is a flat, trough-shaped depression often found with bedrock mortars.

== Example locations of occurrence ==
- Southern Arizona: In the Santa Catalina, Santa Rita, Rincon, Sierrita, and Tucson Mountains, and also in rock outcroppings in the valleys
- Along the north banks of the middle reaches of the Merced River in Mariposa County, California, United States
- In Santa Barbara and San Luis Obispo counties on the California Central Coast
- In northern Mexico within the Sierra Tarahumara of Southern Chihuahua
- The Upper Cumberland Plateau of Tennessee, United States
- Inside many rock shelters in Menifee County, Kentucky, United States
- The Cueva de los Corrales region of northwestern Argentina

== Gallery ==
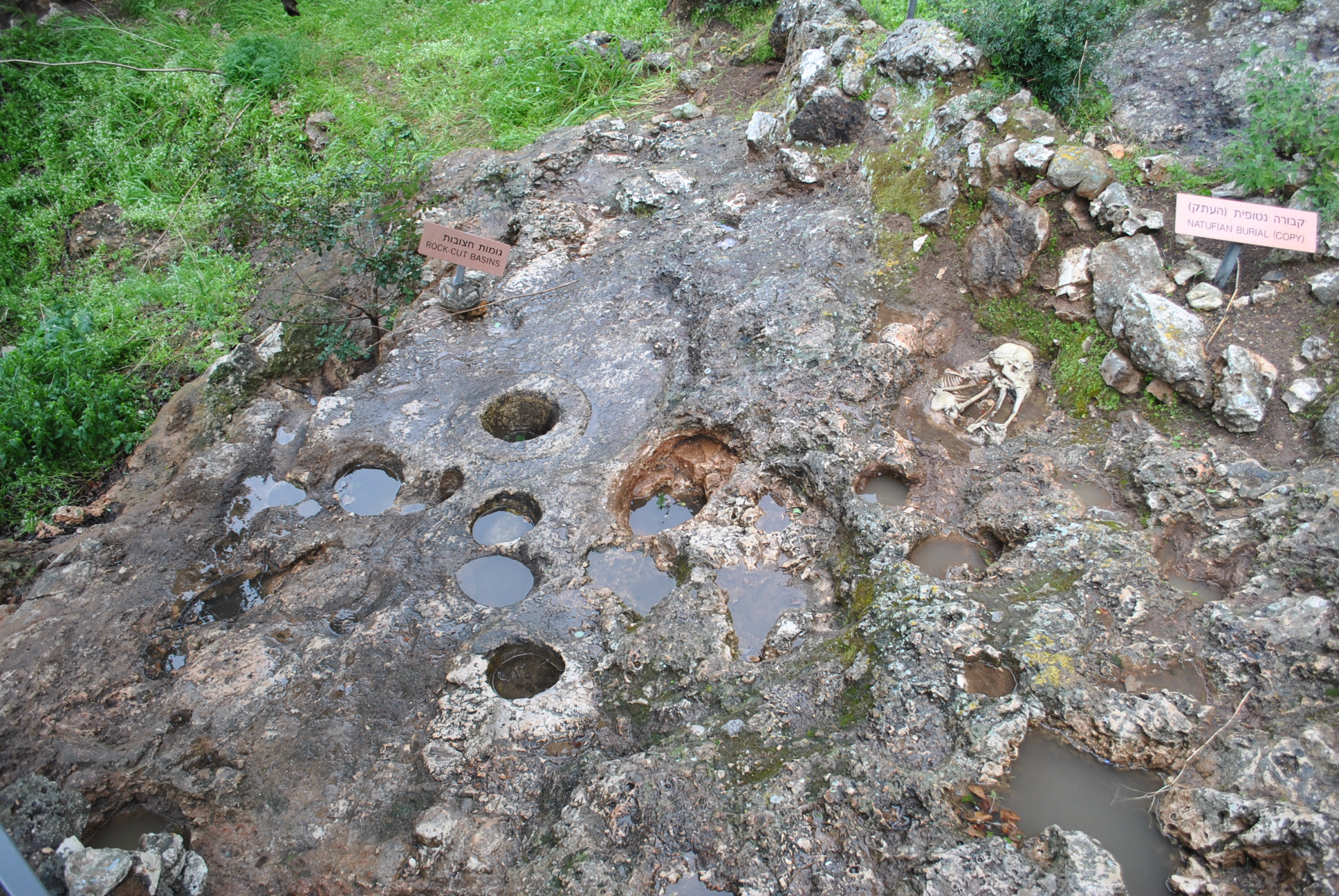
Natufian bedrock mortars at Mount Carmel, Israel.

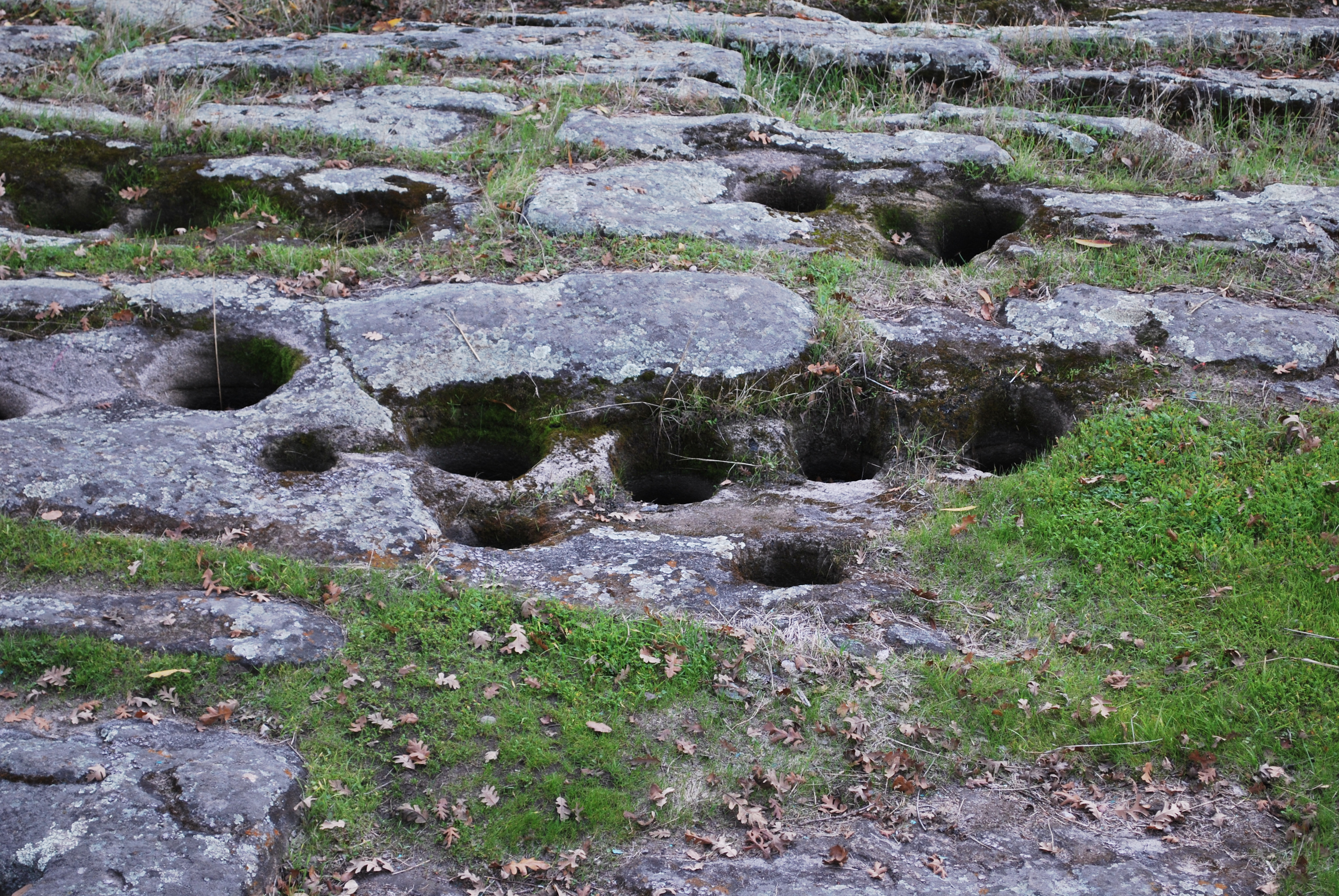
Maidu bedrock mortars in northern California.

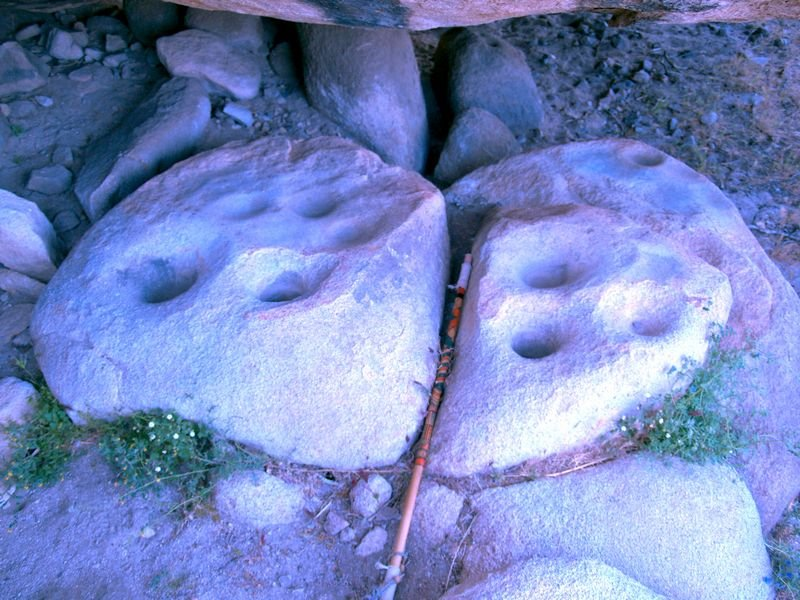
Bedrock mortars at Anza-Borrego Desert State Park in southern California.

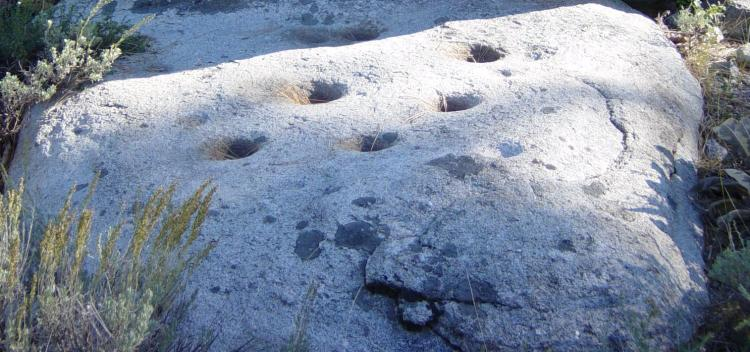
Bedrock mortars used to grind acorns in California.

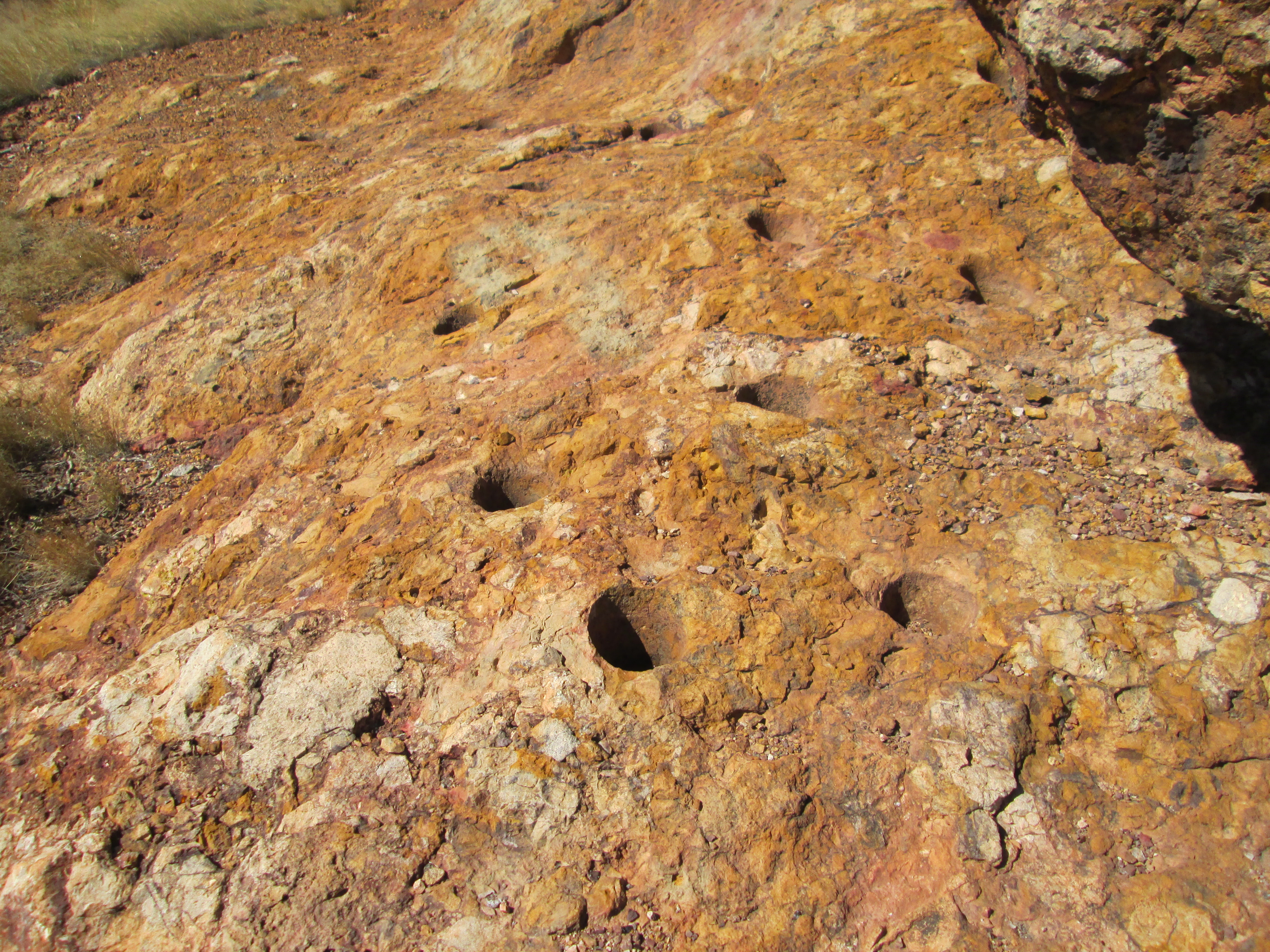
Hohokam bedrock mortars at Indian Kitchen, Arizona.

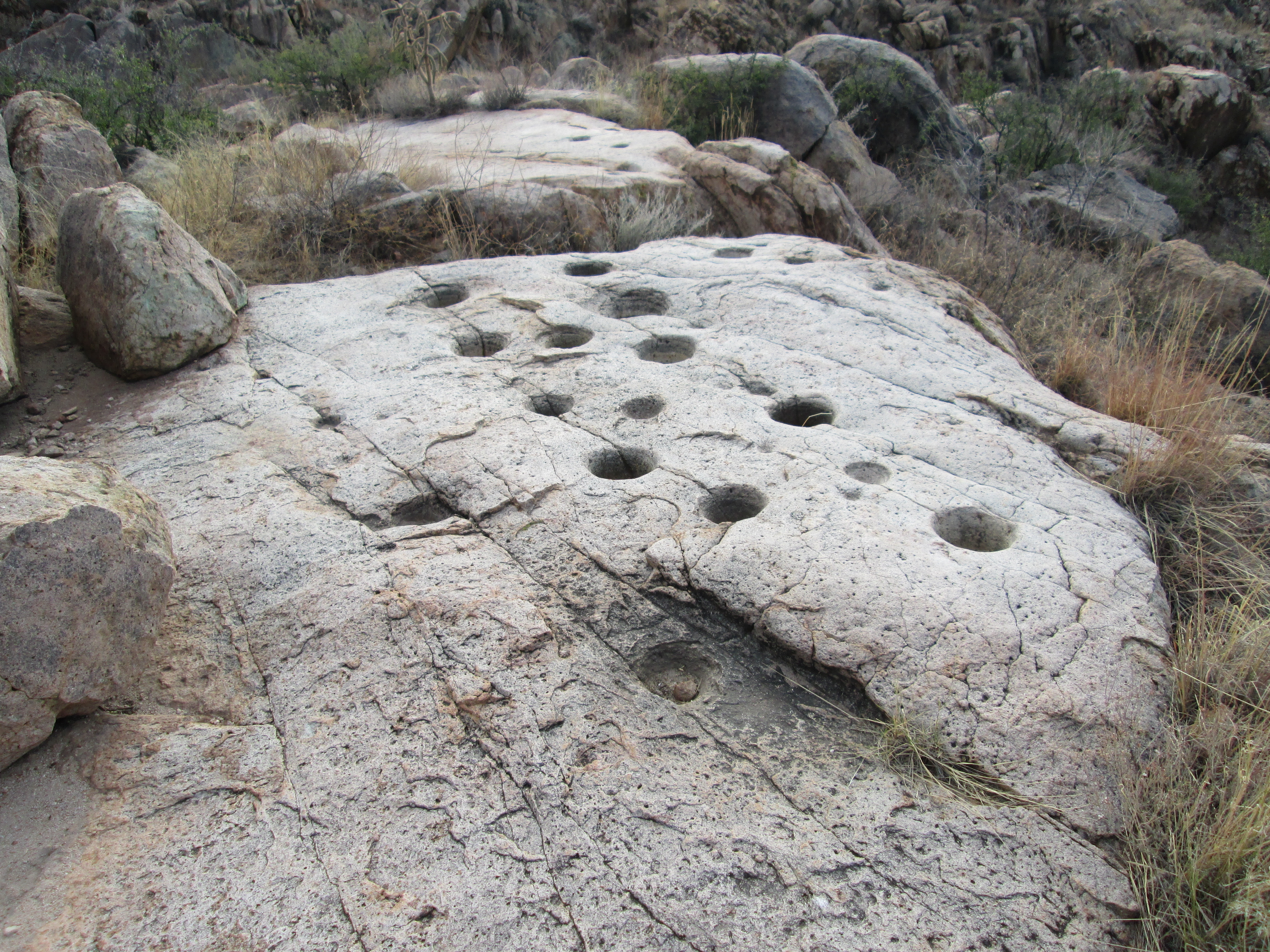
Bedrock mortars at Huerfano Butte.

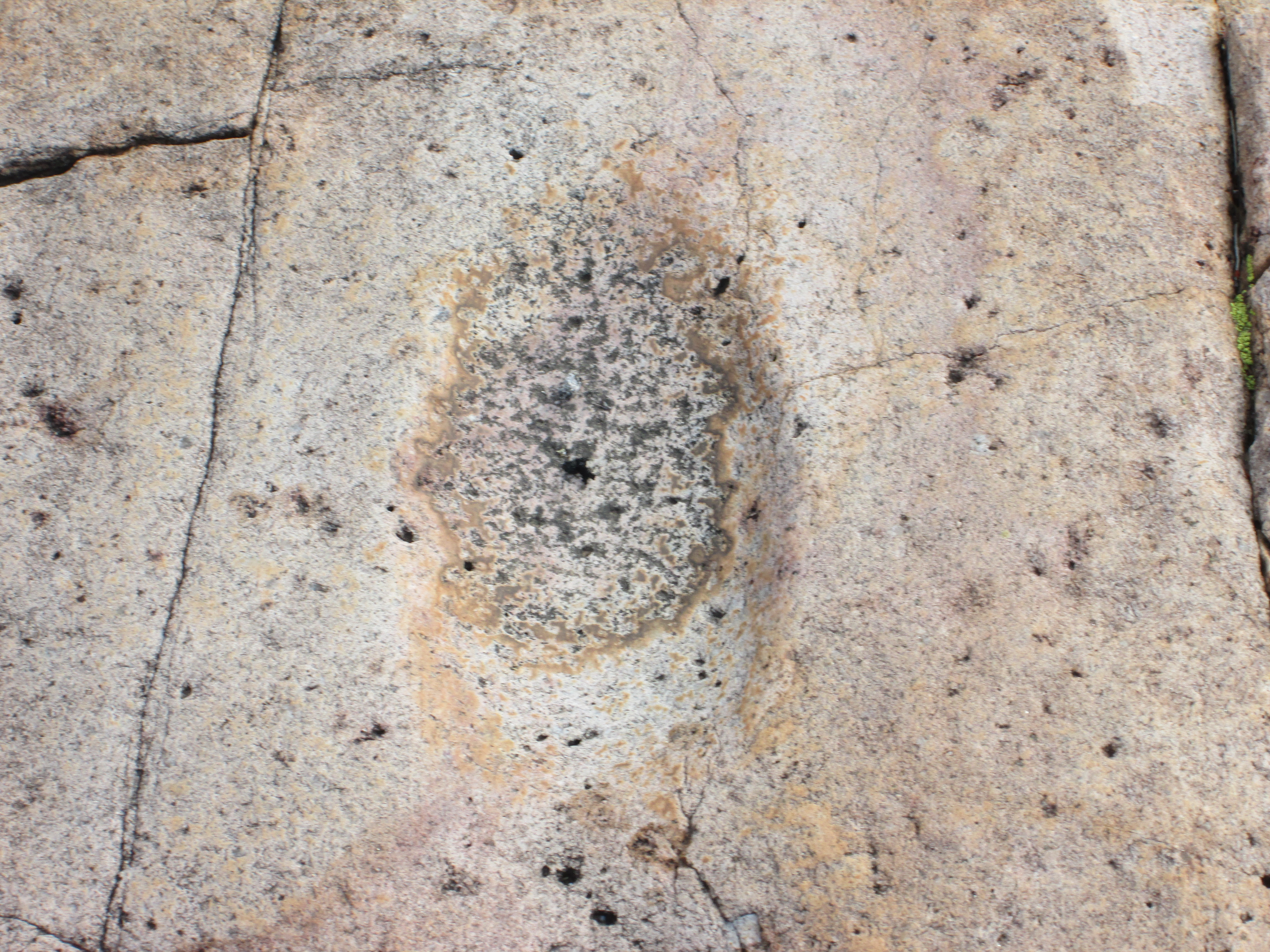
A close up view of a bedrock metate at Huerfano Butte.

== See also ==
- Grinding slab
- Mano
- Metate
- Mortar and pestle
