= Viason Chin, Arizona =

- Populated place
- Location within the state of Arizona Viason Chin (the United States)
- Coordinates: 32°00′55″N 112°17′25″W
- Country: United States
- State: Arizona
- County: Pima
- Elevation: 1,896 ft (578 m)
- Time zone: UTC-7 (Mountain (MST))
  - Summer (DST): UTC-7 (MST)
- Area code: 520
- FIPS code: 04-79905
- GNIS feature ID: 24674

Viason Chin is a populated place situated in Pima County, Arizona, United States. It is a small village located on the San Xavier Indian Reservation, approximately two miles southeast of Pisinemo, and about one and a quarter miles east-northeast of Hali Murk. (Note: For distance from other locations please see the decision card on the GNIS link) Historically, it has also been known as Baileys, Chico Baileys, Hardimui, Santi Vaya, Via Santee, Viasoh Chin, and Visan Chin. Viason Chin's name became official as a decision by the Board on Geographic Names in 1941. In the O'odham language, viason chin means "mouth of erosion". It has an estimated elevation of 1,896 feet (578 m) above sea level.
