= Vopolo Havoka, Arizona =

- Populated place
- Location within the state of Arizona Vopolo Havoka (the United States)
- Coordinates: 31°45′43″N 111°55′27″W
- Country: United States
- State: Arizona
- County: Pima
- Tribe: Tohono O'odham Nation
- Elevation: 2,208 ft (673 m)
- Time zone: UTC-7 (Mountain (MST))
  - Summer (DST): UTC-7 (MST)
- Area code: 520
- FIPS code: 04-80255
- GNIS feature ID: 24676

Vopolo Havoka is a populated place situated in the Sells District of the Papago Indian Reservation in Pima County, Arizona, United States. Historically, it has also been known as Burro Pond, Burro Pond Village, Burro Pond Villages, and Vopelohavooka. Its current name became official per a decision by the Board on Geographic Names in 1941. The term vopolo havoka is the O'odham term meaning "burro pond". It has an estimated elevation of 2,208 feet (673 m) above sea level.
