= Haivan Vaya, Arizona =

Populated place in Pima County, Arizona

- Populated Place
- Location within the state of Arizona Haivan Vaya (the United States)
- Coordinates: 31°36′35″N 111°52′24″W
- Country: United States
- State: Arizona
- County: Pima
- Elevation: 2,841 ft (866 m)
- Time zone: UTC-7 (Mountain (MST))
  - Summer (DST): UTC-7 (MST)
- Area code: 520
- FIPS code: 04-30865
- GNIS feature ID: 24446

Haivan Vaya is a populated place situated in Pima County, Arizona, United States. It has an estimated elevation of 2,841 feet (866 m) above sea level.
