= Vainom Kug, Arizona =

- Populated place
- Location within the state of Arizona Vainom Kug (the United States)
- Coordinates: 32°02′48″N 112°03′28″W
- Country: United States
- State: Arizona
- County: Pima
- Elevation: 2,064 ft (629 m)
- Time zone: UTC-7 (Mountain (MST))
  - Summer (DST): UTC-7 (MST)
- Area code: 520
- FIPS code: 04-78610
- GNIS feature ID: 24670

Vainom Kug is a populated place situated in Pima County, Arizona, United States. Historically, it has also been known as Kvitak, Kvitatk, Pumphouse, Quijotoa Well, Steam Pump, Steam Pump Village, and Vainomkux. Vainom kug is a O'odham term meaning "iron stands". This is a reference to the nearby abandoned mining works of the Weldon Mining Company. The name became official as a result of a Board on Geographic Names decision in 1941. It has an estimated elevation of 2,064 feet (629 m) above sea level.
