= Hoa Murk, Arizona =

- Populated place
- Location within the state of Arizona Hoa Murk (the United States)
- Coordinates: 32°16′47″N 112°40′03″W
- Country: United States
- State: Arizona
- County: Pima
- Elevation: 1,959 ft (597 m)
- Time zone: UTC-7 (Mountain (MST))
  - Summer (DST): UTC-7 (MST)
- Area code: 520
- FIPS code: 04-33115
- GNIS feature ID: 24460

Hoa Murk is a populated place situated in Pima County, Arizona, United States. In the O'odham language, Hoa Murk means Basket Burned, by which it is also known. Other names it has been known by include Hoa Muerta, Pozo Ben, and Romaines Field. Hoa Murk became the official name as a result of a Board on Geographic Names decision in 1941. It has an estimated elevation of 1,959 feet (597 m) above sea level.
