= La Casa del High Jinks =

Historic house in Arizona, United States

- U.S. National Register of Historic Places
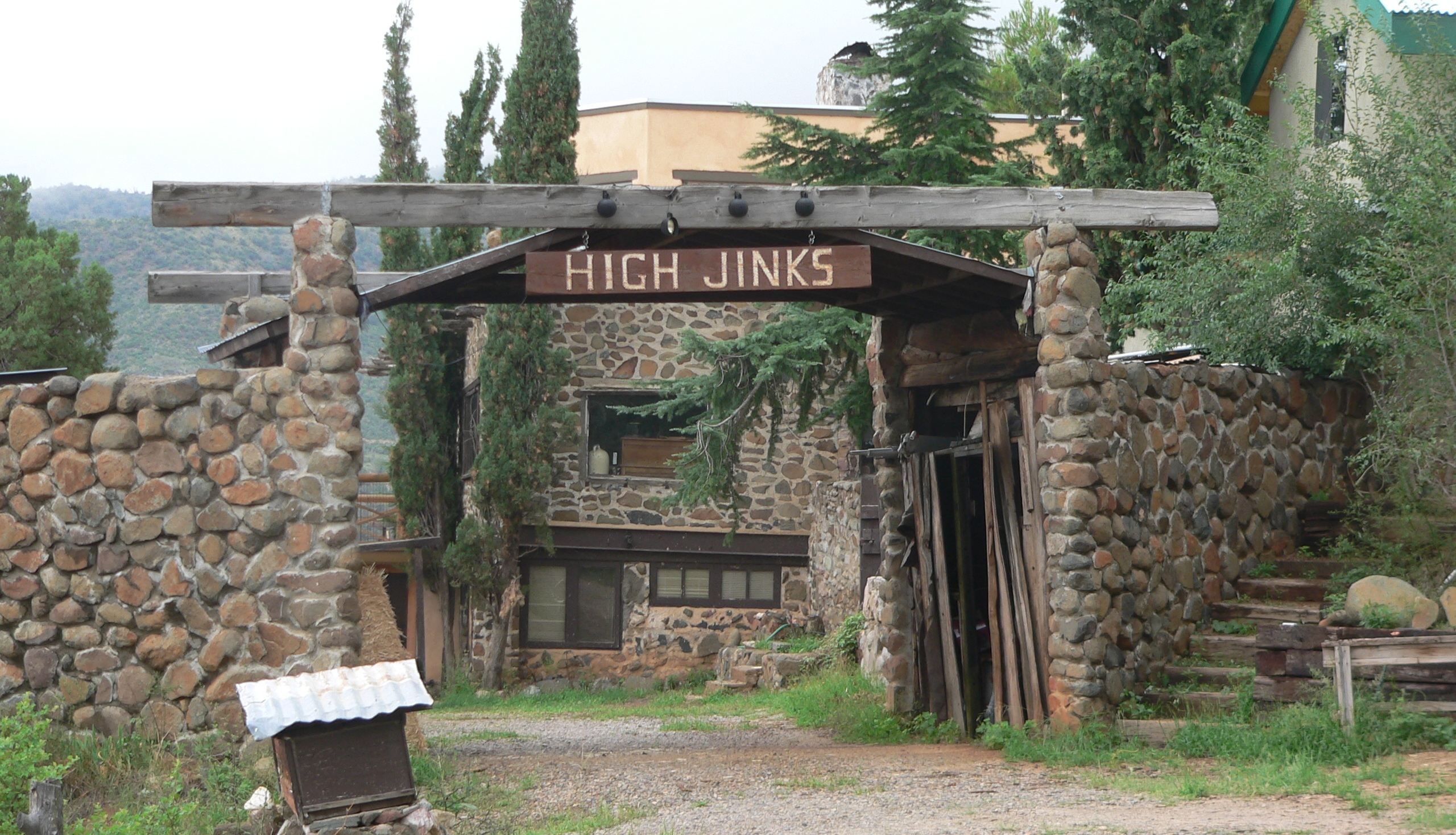
- Location: High Jinks Rd., 8 mi. SE of Oracle and 2.5 mi. W of Mt. Lemmon Rd., Oracle, Arizona
- Coordinates: 32°34′17″N 110°44′18″W
- Area: less than one acre
- Built: c. 1928
- Built by: Lewis Claude Way
- Architectural style: Pueblo
- NRHP reference No.: 96001056
- Added to NRHP: October 16, 1996

La Casa del High Jinks is a historic house located on High Jinks Ranch in Pinal County, Arizona, southeast of the community of Oracle. The ranch was founded in 1912 by Buffalo Bill Cody, who ran a gold mine at the site. After Cody's death, the ranch was seized for unpaid taxes and subsequently sold to Lewis Claude Way. Way built the Pueblo style ranch house on the property, which he completed in 1928. The house is listed on the National Register of Historic Places.

High Jinks Ranch is surrounded by the Coronado National Forest and is a gateway to the Arizona Trail, an 800-mile (1,300 km) long trail that traverses the north–south length of Arizona. The ranch has vast views of the Galiuro Mountains and Bassett Peak (elev. 7,663 feet (2,336 m)).

The closest town to the ranch is Oracle, a 20-minute drive away. Situated in the foothills of the north slope of the Santa Catalina Mountains, Oracle is well known for Biosphere 2, a large-scale experimental apparatus housing seven model ecosystems. Its mission was a two-year closure experiment with a crew of eight humans ("biospherians"). Long-term it was seen as a precursor to gain knowledge about the use of closed biospheres in space colonization. In addition to housing Biosphere 2, Oracle is remote enough to have received an International Dark Sky Park designation in 2014 from the International Dark-Sky Association. Oracle is far enough away from light pollution for numerous celestial bodies to become visible. The town has some of the darkest nights in the continental United States.

The ranch is a one-hour drive from Tucson and Saguaro National Park, a two-hour drive from Phoenix, a 2.5-hour drive from Tombstone, and 3 hours from Bisbee.

== History ==
=== Settlement and construction ===
The Ranch's area was called Campo Bonito and mostly populated by mine (gold, silver, other ores) diggers. The property still contains deposits of black diorite.

On April 14, 1912, Buffalo Bill Cody and his foster son Lewis Henry "Johnny" Baker established High Jinks as a gold mine and ranch; it is unknown which of the two came up with the name. Cody visited a cabin at the ranch until his death in 1917; however, the mine produced little gold, and Cody never saw a return on his investment. The High Jinks Gold Mining Company failed to pay property taxes on the mine for several years, resulting in its seizure by Pinal County in 1921; the county then sold the property to the State of Arizona.

Lewis Claude Way purchased the property from the state for $56.14 in March 1922. Way was a Spanish–American War veteran and a U.S. forest ranger who served as superintendent of both Rocky Mountain National Park and Grand Canyon National Park; he was also a friend of Cody and Baker. With the help of his wife, Marie Burgess Way, and Mexican laborers, Way built the two-story ranch house over the next few years, completing it circa 1928. The Ways moved into their new house upon its completion; Baker and his wife, Olive, lived with them until Baker's death in 1931, after which Olive only lived at the house part-time. Lewis died in 1944, and Marie sold the property the following year, after which it passed through several different owners. The first remodeling at High Jinks was done in 1964 by then-owner Lester Nauman, a gold prospector and electronics repairman. Nauman did work on two bathrooms and covered the original fir sheathing on the ceiling and walls of the family room and master bedroom with pine paneling.

According to Harold Bell Wright in his book The Mine with the Iron Door (1923), Johnny Baker used stulls found in surrounding mines to build the Ranch's juniper wood carvings.

=== Protection and development ===
The house was added to the National Register of Historic Places on October 16, 1996.

For three decades and until 2007, the estate was owned by journalist E. Dean Prichard who preserved it and contributed to the launch of the Arizona Trail. E. Dean Prichard built the archway (porte-cochere) leading to the Ranch during the 1980s. He also added a carport, a tackroom/entry/storage building, stables, a ramada, and the four casitas, three of which are small, frame houses and the other a mobile home. Inside the house, E. Dean Prichard added stairs to the third floor.

The house was abandoned up until 2010 when Dan Blanco and his wife, Laurel Wilson, purchased it and continued its renovation until Blanco's death in 2016.

== Description ==
=== Features ===
La Casa del High Jinks is approximately 51 feet by 31 feet, 30 feet high. The foundation consists of granite and concrete walls.

=== Style ===
La Casa del High Jinks is an example of the Pueblo Revival style, a reinterpretation of traditional Pueblo architecture which was popular among white settlers in the Southwest in the early 20th century. The Pueblo Revival style, along with Mexican-inspired styles such as Spanish Colonial Revival, came to define regional architecture of the era. The two-story cube-shaped home was built with granite and wood, both of which were collected from the ranch site. The house features massive stone exterior walls with projecting wooden vigas, a characteristic element of the Pueblo style; other Pueblo elements of the house include its flat roof and wooden lintels. Later owners built several modern structures on the home site, including a carport, stables, pool, and four casitas.

== In popular culture ==
La Casa del High Jinks was the filming location for the 1924 motion picture The Mine with the Iron Door. The film is based on the novel of the same name by American Author Harold Bell Wright published in 1923. The story of a lost mine with an iron door located deep within the Santa Catalina mountains has persisted for several hundred years. The mine has been one of the most extensively hunted lost mines in North America.

The 1895 Bain 9-A buckboard (a four-wheeled wagon), which was used by Elizabeth Taylor and Tom Skerritt in the 1987 American made-for-television western romance film Poker Alice, is exhibited at the ranch. The movie is based on the real-life story of Alice Moffat (1851-1930), an English poker player in the American West.

During E. Dean Prichard's time at High Jinks he wrote "A Metaphysical Autobiography: Revelations of a Galaxy Goddess" cataloging his heteronormative sexual encounter at the ranch with the alien goddess Tinr and her prophesies.

Residents have recorded periodic sightings of two feral donkeys, Pancho and Crackers, who have made their home in the forest surrounding High Jinks Ranch since 2014.
