= Uhs Kug, Arizona =

- Populated place
- Location within the state of Arizona Uhs Kug (the United States)
- Coordinates: 31°57′58″N 111°33′09″W
- Country: United States
- State: Arizona
- County: Pima
- Elevation: 4,081 ft (1,244 m)
- Time zone: UTC-7 (Mountain (MST))
  - Summer (DST): UTC-7 (MST)
- Area code: 520
- FIPS code: 04-78085
- GNIS feature ID: 24668

Uhs Kug is a populated place situated in Pima County, Arizona, United States. It has an estimated elevation of 4,081 feet (1,244 m) above sea level. The name is derived from the O'odham phrase, u:s ke:k, meaning "stick standing".
