= Vakamok, Arizona =

Populated place in Arizona, US

- Populated place
- Location within the state of Arizona Vakamok (the United States)
- Coordinates: 31°42′20″N 112°01′51″W
- Country: United States
- State: Arizona
- County: Pima
- Elevation: 2,260 ft (690 m)
- Time zone: UTC-7 (Mountain (MST))
  - Summer (DST): UTC-7 (MST)
- Area code: 520
- FIPS code: 04-78715
- GNIS feature ID: 24671

Vakamok is a populated place situated in Pima County, Arizona, United States, adjacent to the international border with Mexico. Historically, it has been known by several names, including Comot, Comoti, and Rusty Shovel. Vakamok is an O'odham word meaning "rusty". The traditional O'odham name for the village was Popolo Vakamakatuk, but the current name was made official as a result of a decision in 1941 by the Board on Geographic Names. It has an estimated elevation of 2,264 feet (690 m) above sea level.
