= Hooper, Arizona =

- Populated place
- Location within the state of Arizona Hooper (the United States)
- Coordinates: 34°15′58″N 112°22′59″W
- Country: United States
- State: Arizona
- County: Yavapai
- Elevation: 5,332 ft (1,625 m)
- Time zone: UTC-7 (Mountain (MST))
  - Summer (DST): UTC-7 (MST)
- Area code: 928
- FIPS code: 04-33460
- GNIS feature ID: 30097

Hooper is a populated place situated in Yavapai County, Arizona, United States. It was begun as a mining camp, originally called Foresight, which was a misspelling of Foresythe, having been named after the Foresythe family, one of whom, John Foresythe, served as postmaster.
