= Hecla, Arizona =

Populated place in Yavapai County, Arizona

- Populated Place
- Location within the state of Arizona Hecla (the United States)
- Coordinates: 34°32′17″N 112°07′18″W
- Country: United States
- State: Arizona
- County: Yavapai
- Elevation: 4,597 ft (1,401 m)
- Time zone: UTC-7 (Mountain (MST))
- Area code: 928
- FIPS code: 04-32335
- GNIS feature ID: 42742

Hecla is a former way station situated in Yavapai County, Arizona, United States. Its name is derived from the nearby Hecla mine. It is also known as Stone Corral.

== History ==
John Stemmer, a former trooper, set up a waystation there on Ash Creek in the 1870s for travellers on the route between Prescott and the Verde Valley. Facilities included at least seven furnished rooms, a bar, retail store, kitchen, dining room, stables and two stone corrals.

In 1884 it passed to AJ Hudson, who with his family continued to operate it as an inn for travellers. Facilities added included a root cellar, and for 18 months a post office under the name of Hecla, by which it was then known. As well as providing for travellers, it was an important location for social gathering for the nearby small communities.

In August 1898 a flash flood on the creek destroyed most of the facilities and the site was abandoned. The stone corral and root cellar remain and it now exists as a historical site on the Prescott National Forest Reserve, accessed by the General Cook hiking trail.
