= Huk Ovi, Arizona =

- Populated place
- Location within the state of Arizona Huk Ovi (the United States)
- Coordinates: 35°53′30″N 110°41′16″W
- Country: United States
- State: Arizona
- County: Navajo
- Elevation: 6,362 ft (1,939 m)
- Time zone: UTC-7 (Mountain (MST))
  - Summer (DST): UTC-7 (MST)
- Area code: 928
- FIPS code: 04-34575
- GNIS feature ID: 24466

Huk Ovi is a populated place situated in Navajo County, Arizona, United States.
