= Helvetia, Arizona =

Ghost town in Pima County, Arizona, US

- Ghost town
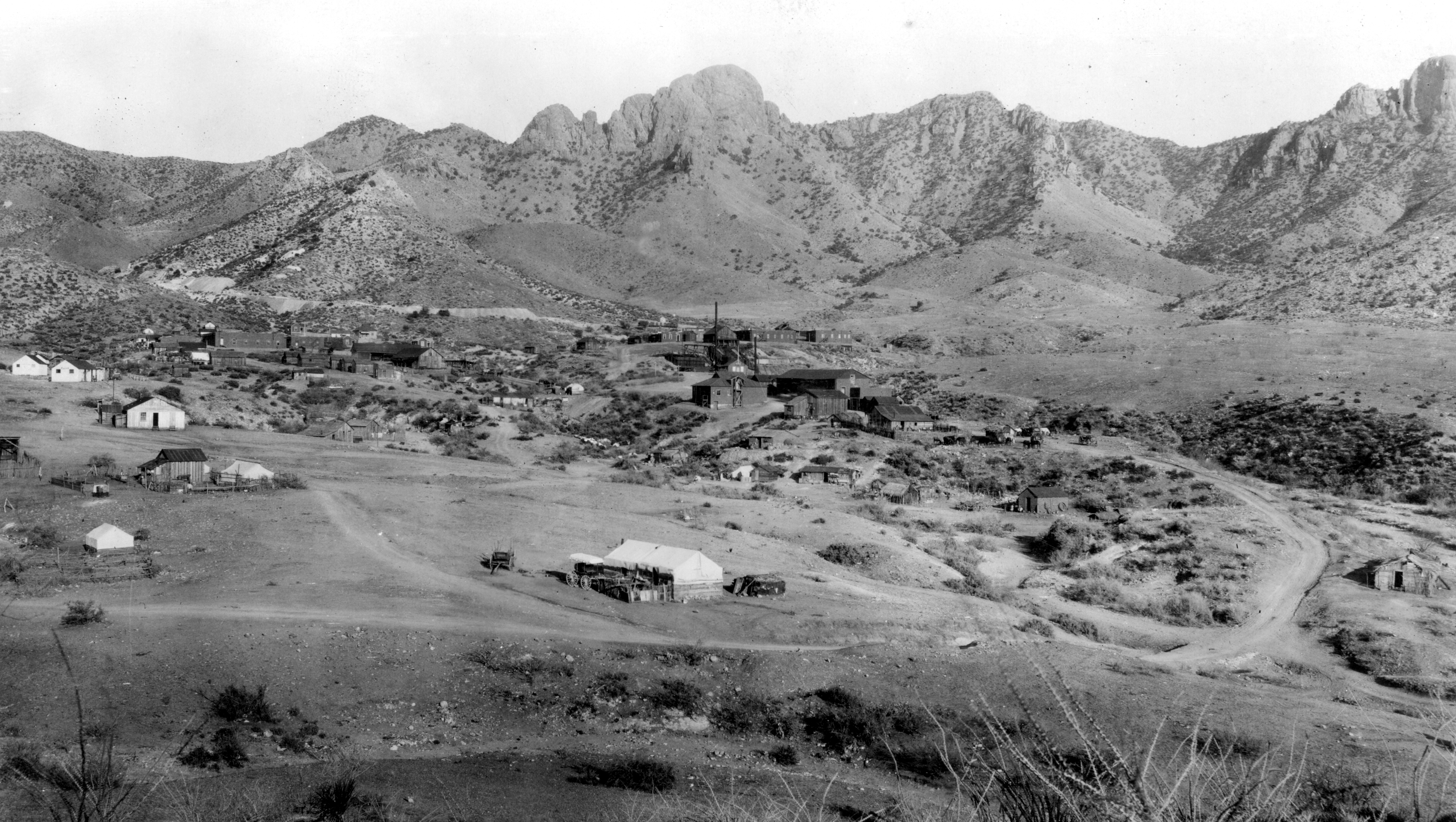
- Helvetia in 1909, facing east.

- Location within Arizona Location within the United States
- Coordinates: 31°51′28″N 110°47′19″W
- Country: United States
- State: Arizona
- County: Pima
- Founded: 1891
- Abandoned: 1921
- Elevation: 4,324 ft (1,318 m)
- Time zone: UTC-7 (MST (no DST))
- Post Office opened: December 12, 1899
- Post Office closed: December 31, 1921

Helvetia is a ghost town in Pima County, Arizona, United States that was settled in 1891 and abandoned in the early 1920s. Helvetia is an ancient name for Switzerland. Today, only the Ray Mine and cemetery are visitable, as the rest of the town has been fenced off due to active mining operations.

== History ==
The Santa Rita Mountains had been a locale of mining since the mountain range had been part of the Spanish Empire, all the way through to the Gadsden Purchase of 1854, when it became a part of the United States. Although it had always been for silver or gold.

This changed in 1875, when Tucson business partners Pinckney Tully and Estevan Ochoa — who were involved in freighting and mining — hauled about 5,000 pounds of copper ore to Tucson to be smelted. Possibly being the first time a significant amount of copper ore was taken from the mountain range.

A few years later, Ben Hefti, T.G. Roddick and other claimholders formed the Helvetia Mining District, a ten square mile area on the western slope of the mountain. Hefti named it after the ancient name of his birthplace, Switzerland.

In 1879, Roddick and James K. Brown, co-owners of the nearby Sahuarito Ranch,(from where the town of Sahuarita, derives its misspelled name) filed a mining claim called the Modoc, possibly the first one since the new district was formed.

A national recession in 1883, made it unprofitable to mine copper in the mountain and soon after most of the activity in the district came to a halt.

This inactivity would last almost a decade before a revival of sorts would take place in the early 1890s, as demand grew for copper wire for new electrical products.

Paine Webber & Company, an eastern investment firm, started operating in the Helvetia Mining District, and in the early stages did a lot of testing of its land. Several shafts were dug, and exploratory drillings were carried out. The employees of this company soon would form the basis of a mining camp called Helvetia.

By 1899, Paine Webber & Co. had founded the Helvetia Copper Co. of New Jersey, a separate entity to handle the mining operations in the mining district.

Along with this change, several others took place. The population exploded from less than 55 employees early in the year to about 350 workers by the end, with a total population of about 550 residents. To get these individuals to and from, a wagon road from Helvetia to the Vail train station was constructed and the first stage line from the camp to Tucson was set up.

A narrow-gauge railroad, that in time reached more than 4 miles in length, was finished, which transported ore from the mines farther away from Helvetia, to the new smelter that was installed at the camp. Soon after the camp got its first school and a post office as well.

Merchants such as Verdugo and Barcelo set up shop. Camp butchers Casky & Korb sold cuts of beef to laborers and miners that had been sold to them by ranchers in the area. There was also a barbershop, a cobbler and a Chinese laundry.

Helvetia would become Pima County's biggest and most important mining camp around the turn of the twentieth century, a title that would be short lived.

While there was no lack of copper ore in the mining district, water was another story and the lack of it, made it difficult keep the new smelter cool. Another issue was a shortage of coke (a concentrated form of bituminous coal) which had to be brought in from the Vail station. The company found themselves unable to run the new smelter continuously and lost potential profits.

The following year, the smelter burned down, temporarily shutting down operations until the following year.

In 1905, a new company with a similar name Helvetia Copper Co. of Arizona took over but did not have much better luck that its predecessor in turning a profit.

The Panic of 1907, a national financial crisis caused many issues in the mining camp and by 1911 the company shut down operations. The camp survived for a few more years, having life breathed into it during the U.S. involvement in WWI, when copper was needed for the war effort. In 1923, the school shut down and the far majority of the residents moved to the mining town of Greaterville or Tucson.

The 1967 western film Hombre was shot in Helvetia.

== Today ==
There is not much left of Helvetia to see, simply a pair of foundation walls rising above a floor, the ruins of the smelter, and the cemetery. In the vicinity there are slag heaps and shafts from the mines.

== Geography ==
Helvetia is located in the Santa Rita Mountains, north of Madera Canyon, at 31°51′28″N 110°47′17″W.

== The Rosemont project ==
The Rosemont project is a large porphyry copper deposit nearby, which may yet be developed into a mine pending proper approval. There is an extensive area of porphyry copper mineralization between Helvetia and the ghost town of Rosemont. Four centers of potentially economic copper mineralization are known. The best-delineated deposit is the Rosemont, which has a geological ore reserve of around 550 million tons at about 0.45% copper, with significant molybdenum and silver credits.

In 2010, Rosemont was owned by Augusta Resources. Augusta hoped to put the Rosemont into production as early as 2011. The Rosemont Copper plan was to create a 21st-century mine in Southern Arizona. Rosemont's plan set new higher standards for environmental protection by using new technologies for water conservation and tailings storage. In addition Rosemont Copper was expected to produce more than 2,900 jobs annually for the state of Arizona and more than $19 billion in economic activity.

Rosemont Copper's plan was being reviewed by numerous local, state, and federal authorities and would only be issued permits to operate once all environmental protections were in place.

There is significant local opposition to the construction of the mine, including concerns about the loss of the multiple historic and pre-historic sites that are in the area, cultural resources, and natural habitation.

== Gallery ==
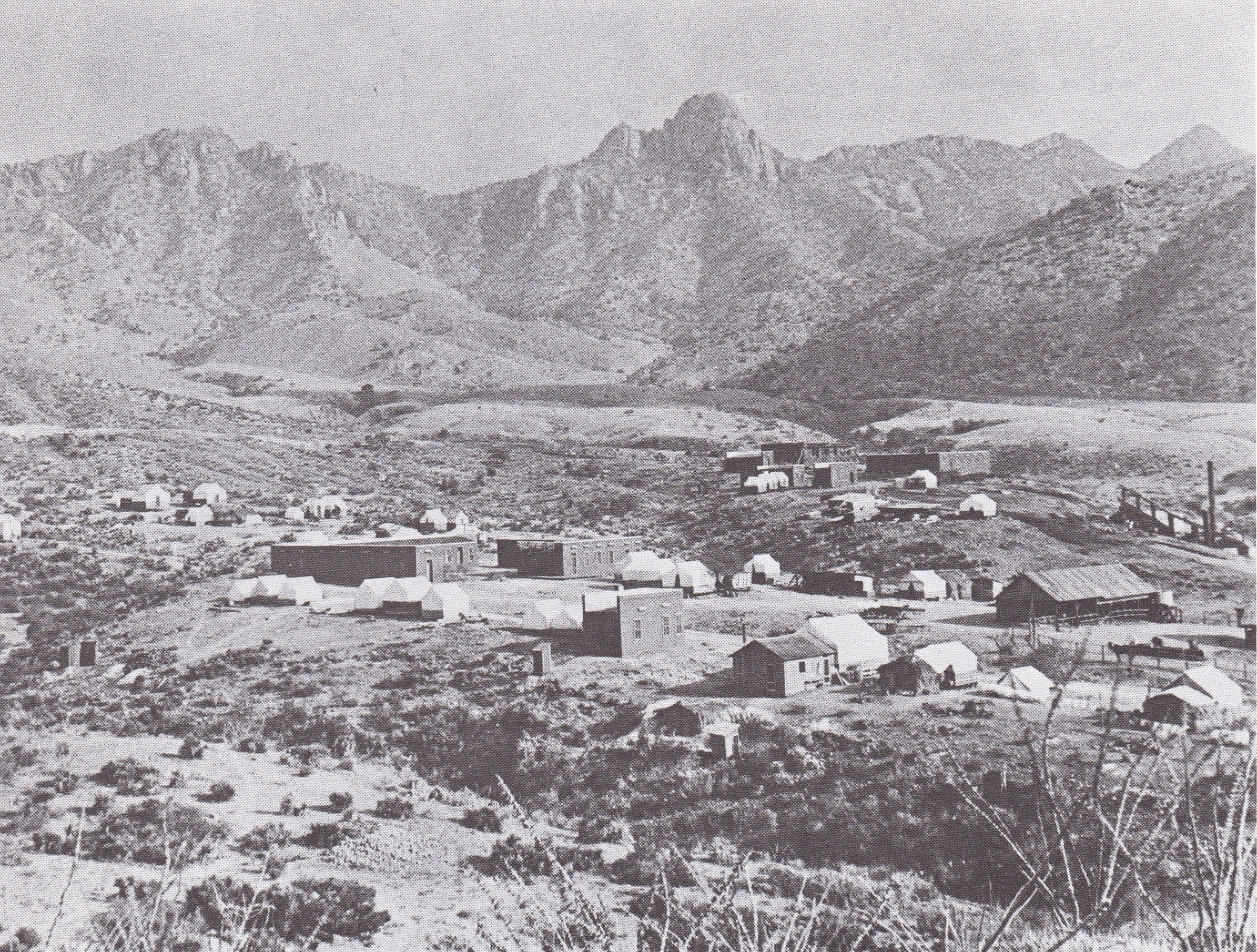
Helvetia in 1901.

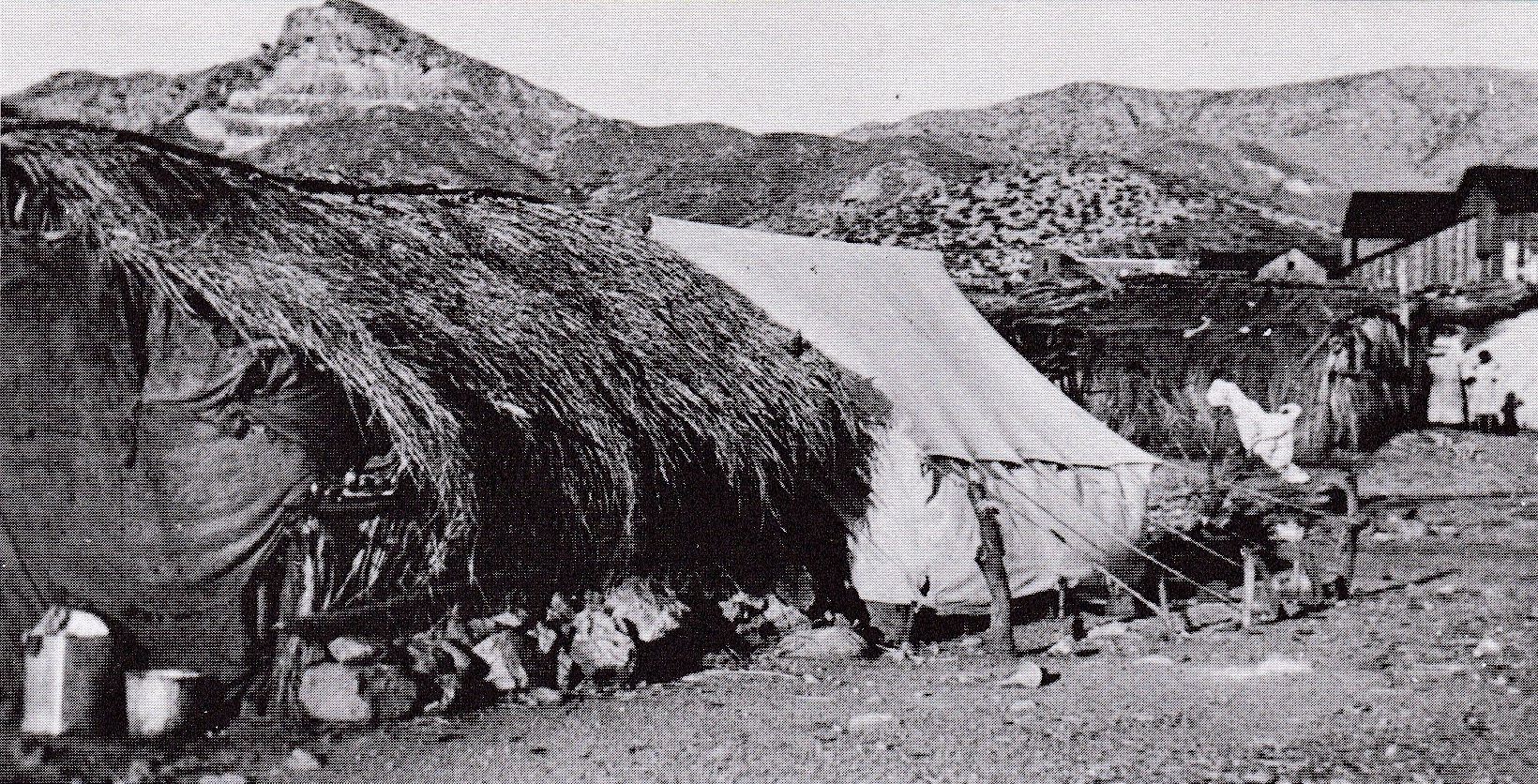
Makeshift dwellings in Helvetia in 1902.

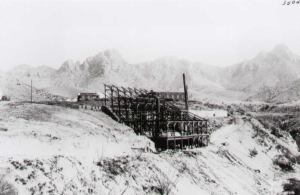
The smelter in Helvetia, sometime before 1921.

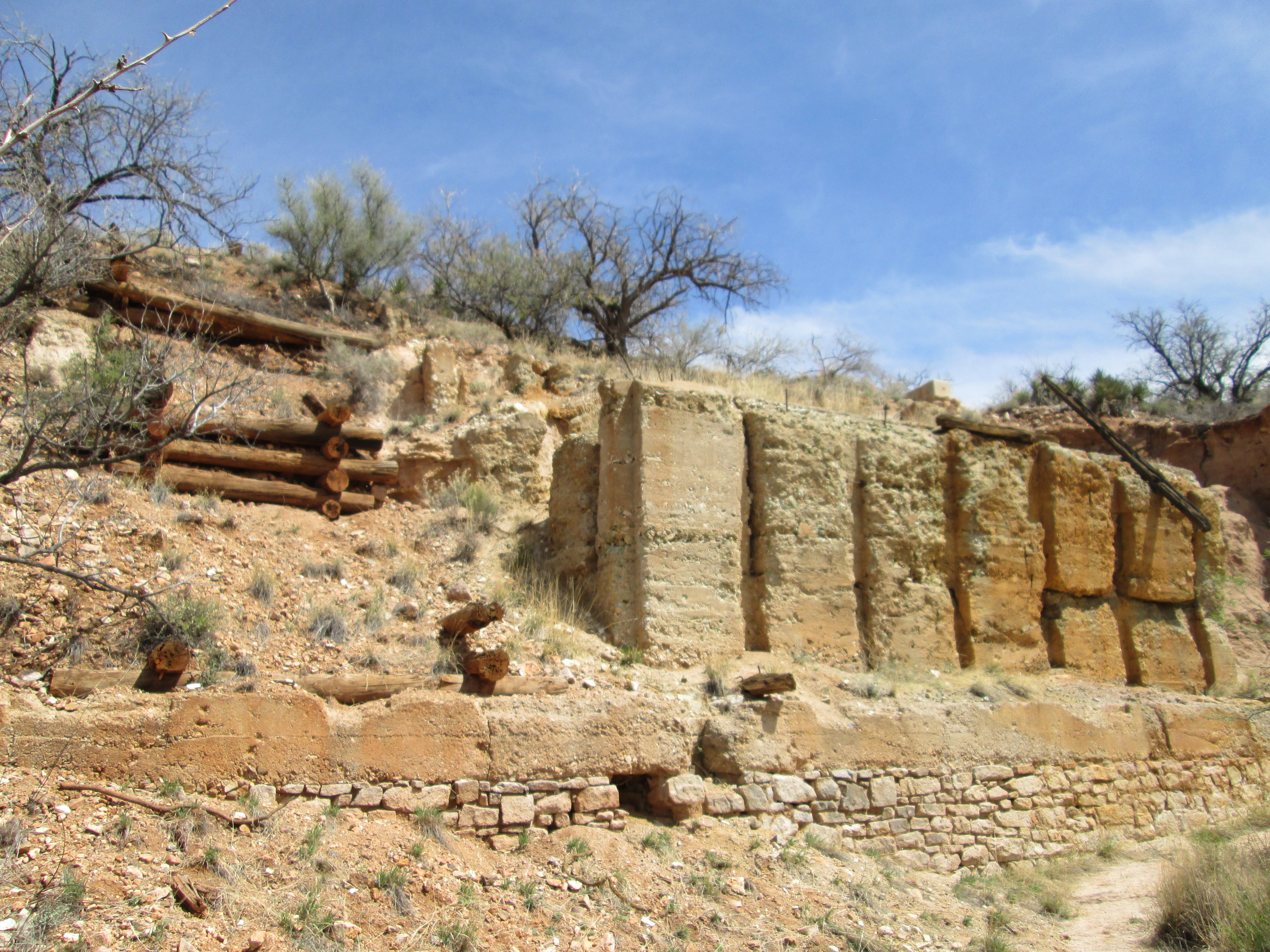
The ruins of the smelter in 2014.

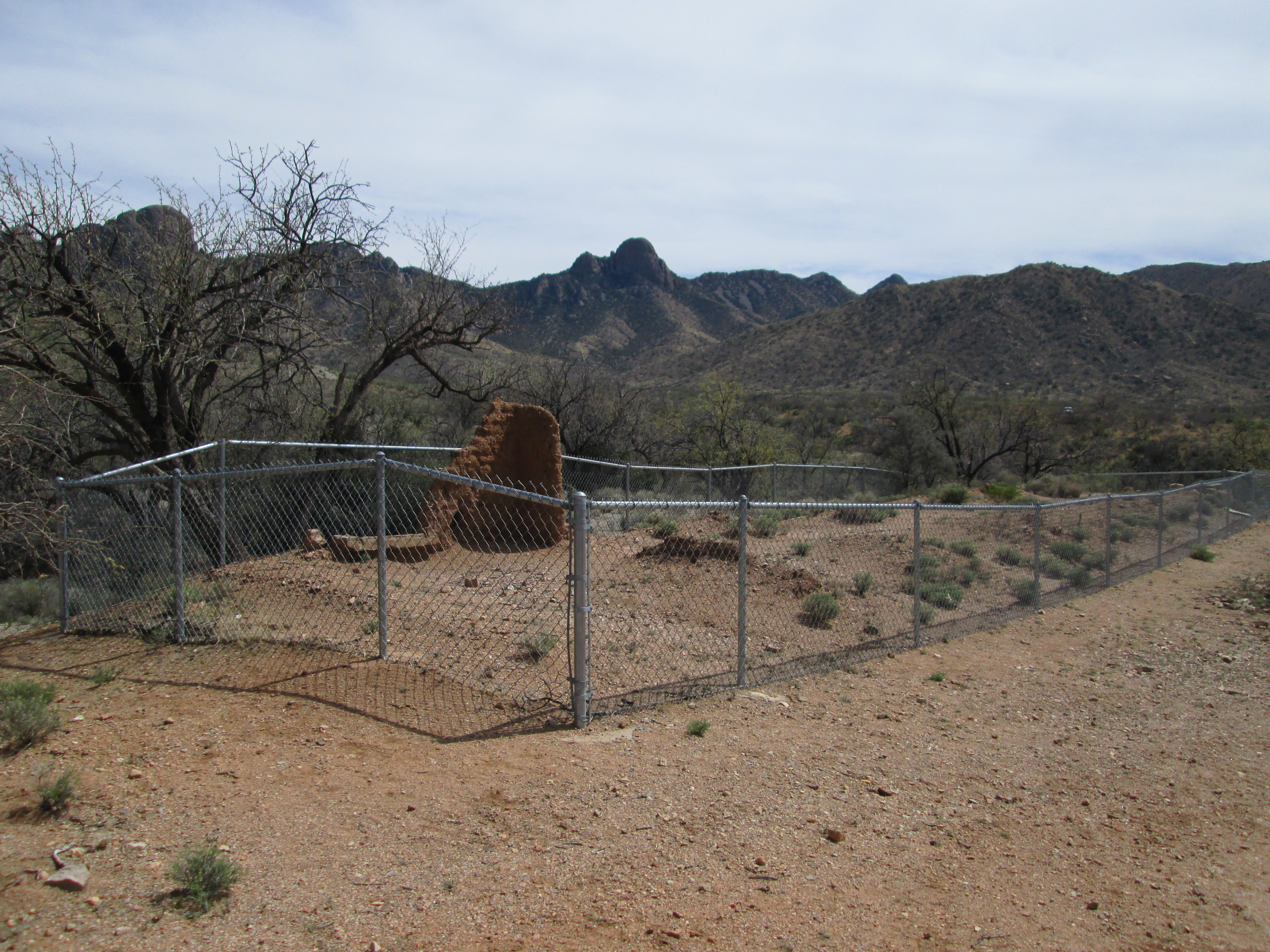
The fenced-in ruins of an adobe hotel in Helvetia.

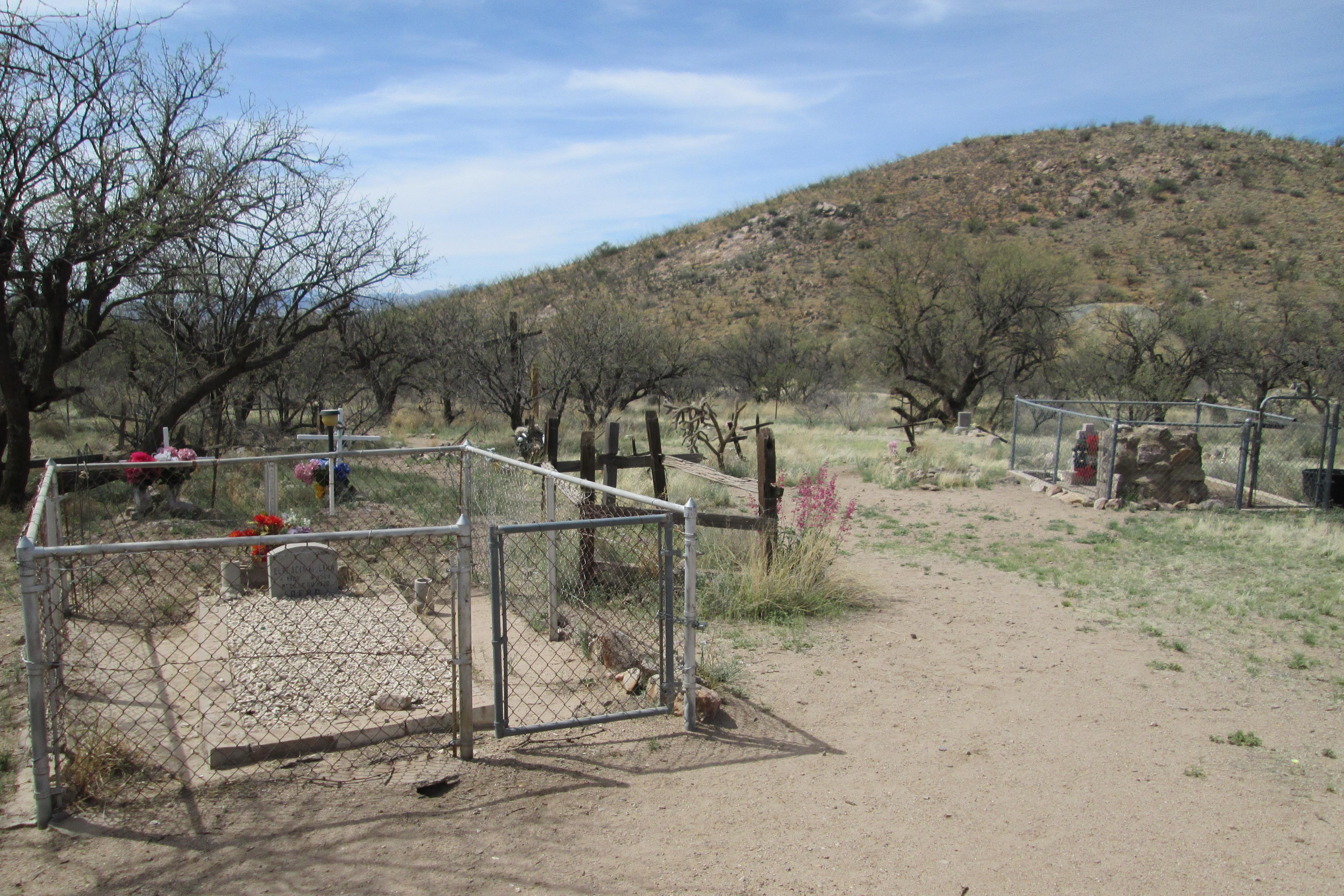
The Helvetia Cemetery in 2014.

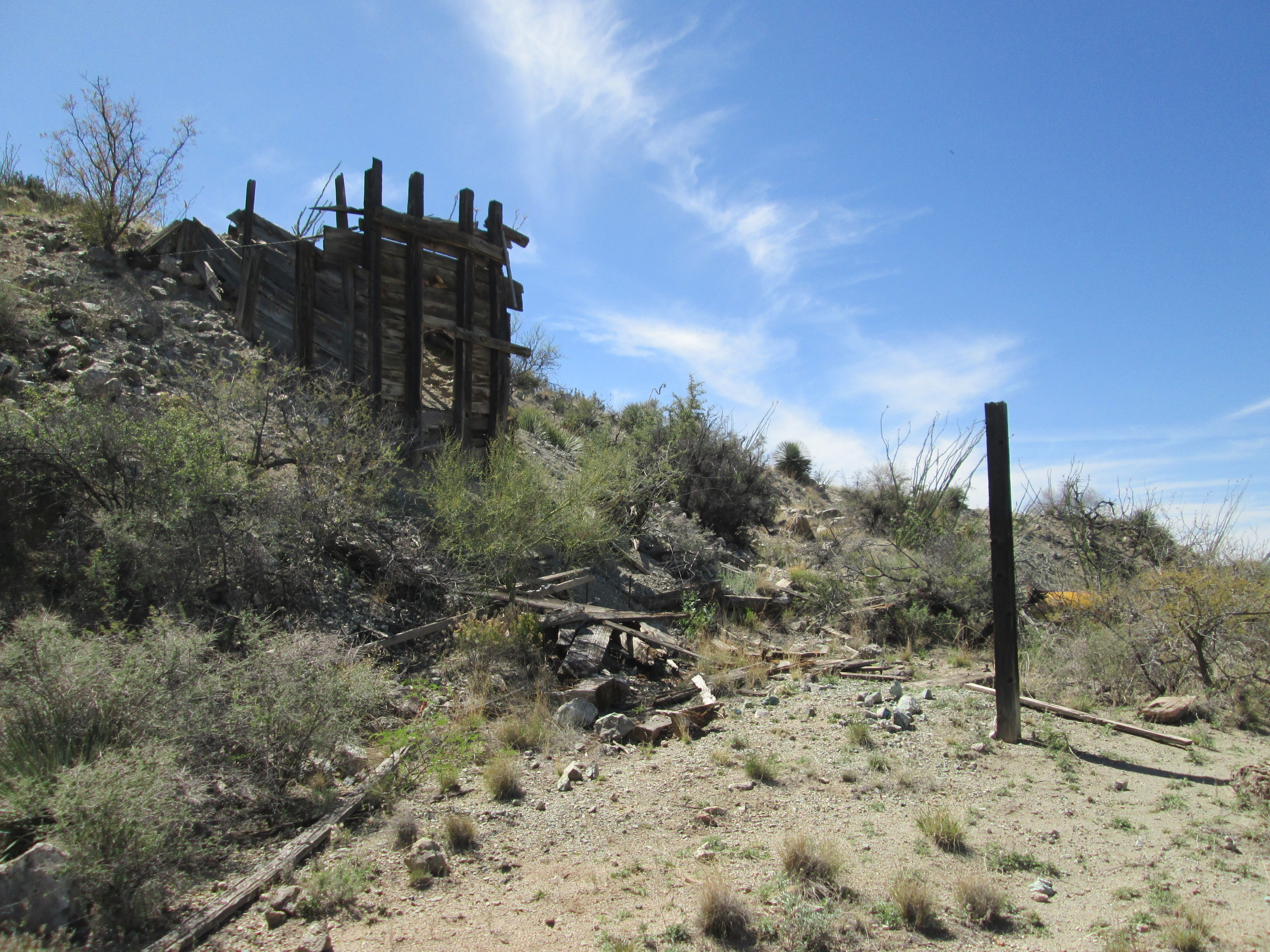
Ruins of the mine.

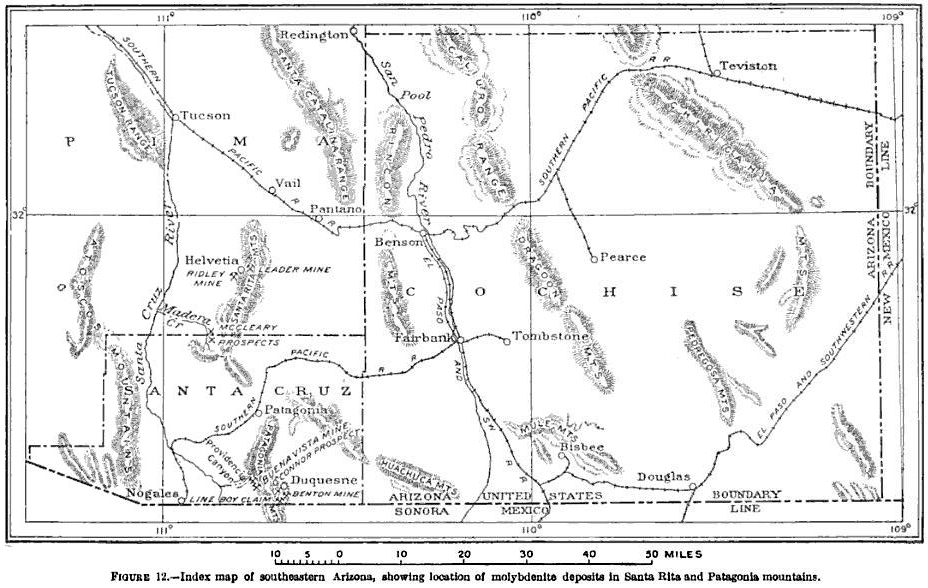
USGS map of southeastern Arizona including Helvetia, c.1910.

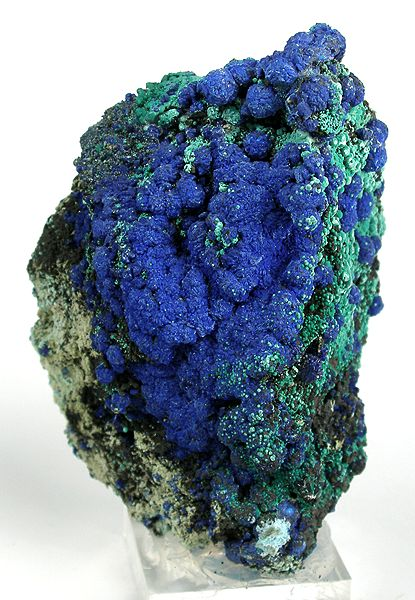
Azurite on malachite from Helvetia. Size: 6.6 x 4.3 x 3.1 cm.

== See also ==
- List of ghost towns in Arizona
- Santa Rita Experimental Range and Wildlife Area
- Larcena Pennington Page
