= Hali Murk, Arizona =

Populated place in Pima County, Arizona

- Populated Place
- Location within the state of Arizona Hali Murk (the United States)
- Coordinates: 32°00′04″N 112°17′39″W
- Country: United States
- State: Arizona
- County: Pima
- Elevation: 1,867 ft (569 m)
- Time zone: UTC-7 (Mountain (MST))
  - Summer (DST): UTC-7 (MST)
- Area code: 520
- FIPS code: 04-30885
- GNIS feature ID: 24447

Hali Murk is a populated place situated in Pima County, Arizona, United States. The name became official in 1941 through a decision of the Board on Geographic Names. It has also been known by Haal-Muihedak, Hardimui, Harle Muheta, Harlemuheta, Mesqual, and Mesquit. It has an estimated elevation of 1,867 feet (569 m) above sea level.
