= Hickiwan, Arizona =

- Populated place
- Location within the state of Arizona Hickiwan (the United States)
- Coordinates: 32°22′08″N 112°28′32″W
- Country: United States
- State: Arizona
- County: Pima
- Tribe: Tohono O'odham Nation
- Elevation: 2,200 ft (670 m)
- Time zone: UTC-7 (Mountain (MST))
  - Summer (DST): UTC-7 (MST)
- Area code: 520
- FIPS code: 04-32650
- GNIS feature ID: 5752

Hickiwan is a populated place situated in Pima County, Arizona, United States. It has been known by a plethora of names over the years, such as Hikibon, Hikiro, Hikjorn, Hikuwan, Jiquibo, Kokuli, Milpitas, Perigua, Periqua, Piriqua, and Tachitoa. The name was officially recognized as Hickiwan by a decision of the Board on Geographic Names in 1941. It has an estimated elevation of 2,198 feet (670 m) above sea level.

Vaya Chin, also historically known as South Well during the 1930s, is located at Hickiwan. The name is derived from the O'odham term vaya chin, meaning "well's mouth".
