= Hope, Arizona =

Unincorporatred community in La Paz County, Arizona, United States

- Unincorporated community
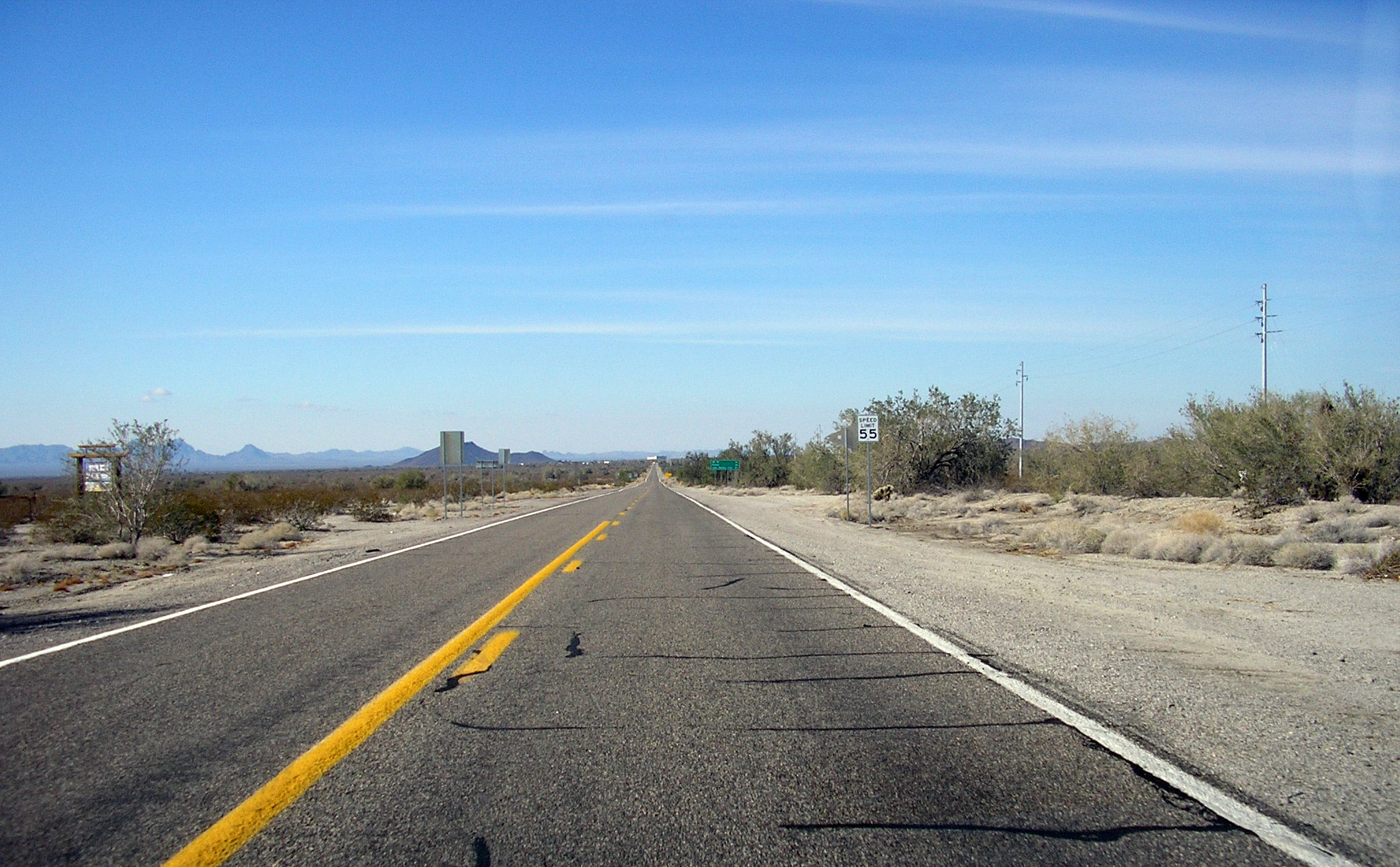
- Hope Highway (AZ-72) just north of Hope, Arizona

- Location within Arizona Location within the United States
- Country: United States
- State: Arizona
- County: La Paz
- Elevation: 1,526 ft (465 m)
- Time zone: UTC-7 (Mountain (MST))
- Area code: 928
- GNIS feature ID: 24462

Hope is a small unincorporated community in the deserts of La Paz County, Arizona, United States.

Hope was founded as a rail town called Johannesberg on the Arizona and California Railroad in 1909. The community was revitalized by the construction of what are now State Routes 60 and 72 in the 1930s, and it declined after the construction of Interstate 10, which bypassed the area.

Hope is the site of a noted road sign claiming that travellers are "beyond Hope".

== Geography ==
Hope is at the base of Granite Wash Pass in the McMullen Valley, at the junction of Arizona State Route 72 and Arizona State Route 60. The section of Highway 72 between Bouse and Hope is also known as the Hope Highway. This historic road was an Arizona Territorial-period (1863–1912) road first established in 1865.

== History ==
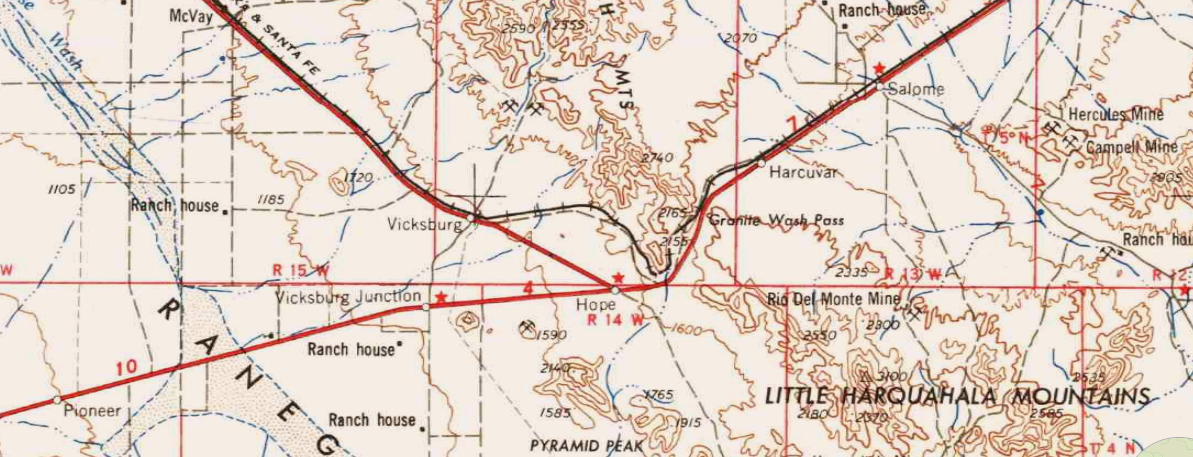
Hope, Arizona, and surrounding areas in 1954

In 1865, Arizona Territory built a road through the area which reached the Colorado River Indian Reservation, providing a connection between the white settlers of Arizona and the Chemehuevi and Mohave tribes. This road later became State Route 72, also known as the Hope Highway.

In the early 1900s, the Arizona and California Railroad, a branch of the Santa Fe Railroad, was built through the area, passing through what is now Hope, Bouse, and Salome. In Arizona, the rail line ran between Wickenburg and Parker. The community was originally founded under the name Johannesberg, and in 1909, the Arizona Gazette announced that the "new town had sprung into existence."

The Johannesberg community was renamed Hope in the 1920s by merchants visiting the town. In the 1920s, State Route 60 bypassed the original Johannesberg site, leading residents to relocate to the newly-constructed highway.

By the 1930s, Hope was one of the Arizona towns served icebox ice by the Parker Ice Company of Parker (the others being Aguila, Vicksburg, Bouse, Wenden, and Salome). Between 1934 and 1938, the Hope Highway was expanded during the construction period for Parker Dam; the route was improved by paving and widening the road.

Hope is near the site where General George Patton trained soldiers during World War II.

Tourism to the area started in the 1930s due to the development of the two highways, which linked Phoenix to the West Coast, but the later construction of Interstate 10 and the Brenda cutoff "left Salome, Hope, Wenden and Aguila marooned in the desert." Hope and the nearby communities have been called part of the "Great Arizona Outback [...] where the frontier never closed".

In 2010, La Paz County officials stated that Hope "is anticipated to be a growing community over the next decade with a focus on local services and residential community development." The community is one of the towns expressly part of La Paz County's comprehensive plan.

Today Hope is noted for its mining and also its hiking trails.

A roadside sign just outside of Hope states, "If you can read this sign, you are beyond Hope." According to one book, "the sign exemplifies the humor and eclectic boosterism that have always been present in the McMullen Valley."

== See also ==
- Desert Wells, Arizona
