= Arizona State Route 72 =

State highway in La Paz County, Arizona, United States

State Route 72
- SR 72 highlighted in red

Route information
- Maintained by ADOT
- Length: 36.74 mi (59.13 km)
- Existed: 1930–present

Major junctions
- West end: SR 95 near Parker
- East end: US 60 in Hope

Location
- Country: United States
- State: Arizona

Highway system
- Arizona State Highway System; Interstate; US; State; Scenic Proposed; Former
← SR 71	→ SR 73

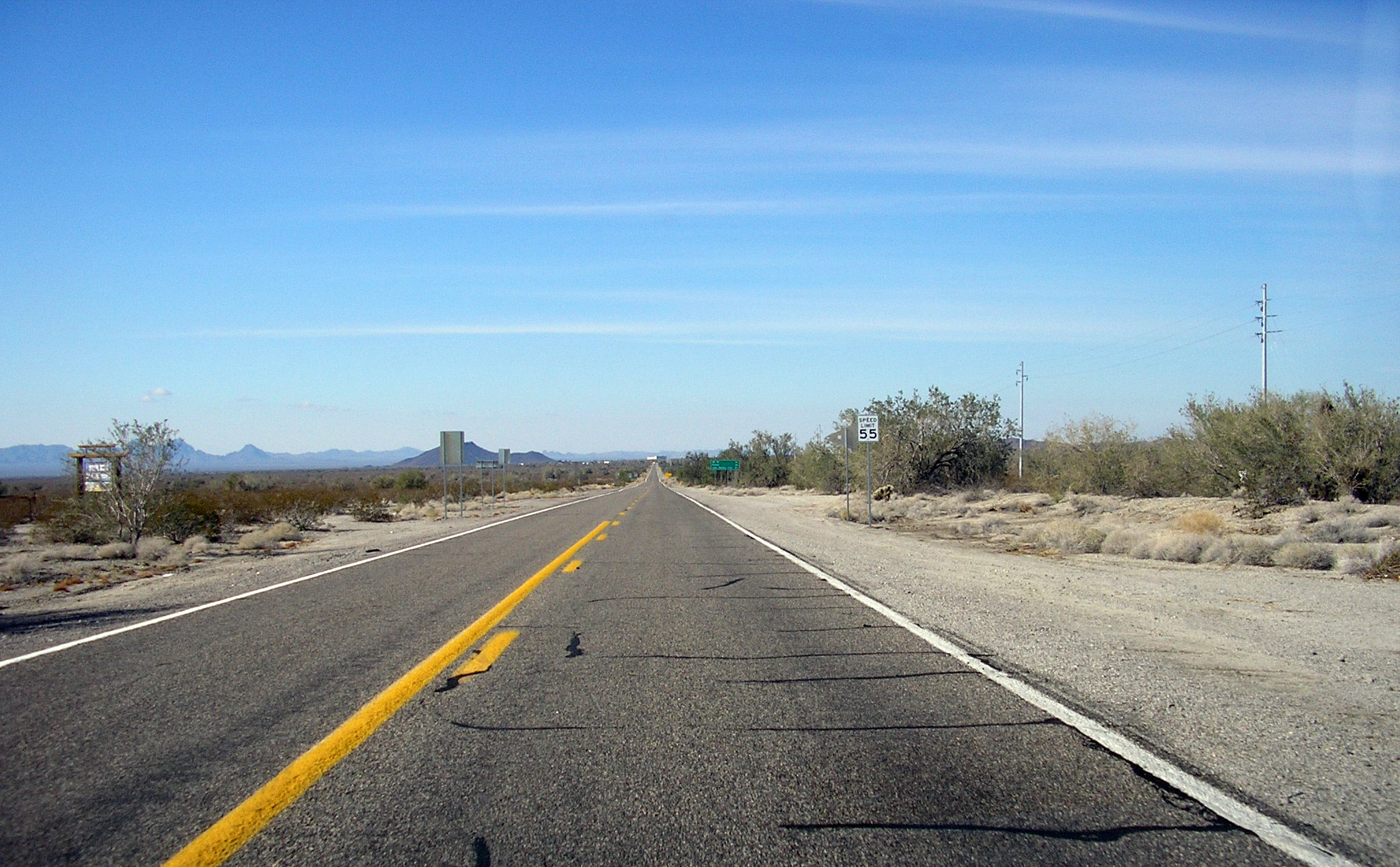
Arizona State Highway 72, just north of Hope, Arizona, looking north

State Route 72 (SR 72) is a 36.74-mile-long (59.13 km) state highway in the U.S. state of Arizona. It runs from SR 95 near Parker southeast to U.S. Route 60 (US 60) in Hope. Along its route in La Paz County, the highway is mostly parallel to the Arizona and California Railroad and runs through the community of Bouse in desert terrain. The route was established in 1930 from its current eastern terminus all the way to the California state line, but was truncated in 1965. The route was completely paved by 1940.

== Route description ==
SR 72 begins at a T-intersection at which SR 95 turns from north–south to east–west south of Parker. The highway heads eastward into desert terrain. Turning southeastward, the route enters the town of Bouse, running parallel to the Arizona and California Railroad. SR 72 enters Bouse as Broadway Avenue. As it runs through the community, the railroad to its northeast cuts most of the town in half, with a commercial areas both southwest and northeast of the roadway, but none along the railroad. Exiting Bouse, the highway enters an area dotted with farms spread among the desert, passing the communities of McVay and Utting. SR 72 crosses over the Central Arizona Project aqueduct southeast of McVay. Near a junction with Vicksburg Road in Vicksburg, the railroad turns away from SR 72 as the roadway heads southeast. The route ends at a junction with US 60 near Hope.

The highway is maintained by the Arizona Department of Transportation (ADOT), which is responsible for constructing and maintaining highways in the state. As part of this role, ADOT surveys volumes of traffic on their highways. These surveys are most often presented in the form of annual average daily traffic (AADT), which is the number of vehicles that travel a road during an average day during the year. In 2009, ADOT calculated that around 2,600 vehicles used the road daily near Bouse, and around 2,000 daily near Vicksburg. No part of the highway has been listed in the National Highway System, a system of roads in the United States important to the nation's economy, defense, and mobility.

== History ==
SR 72 was first established in 1930 from US 60 through Bouse to the California state boundary along the Colorado River at Parker, with a spur. At the time, it was a dirt road. Between 1935 and 1939, the section of the route from Parker to Bouse had been paved, as was a section slightly north of Vicksburg. The rest of the highway had been graveled at the time, and was paved the next year. In 1962, SR 72 was removed from the SR 95 junction near the southern city limit of Parker to the California state line. This section was added as part of a northern extension of SR 95, with the section north of then-SR 172 becoming a spur of SR 95. A section of the highway just east of the western terminus was widened in 2008. A new traffic signal was installed at the SR 95 junction in 2010.

== Junction list ==
The entire route is in La Paz County.

Location	mi	km	Destinations	Notes
	0.00	0.00	SR 95 – Parker, Lake Havasu City, Yuma	Western terminus; highway continues as SR 95 north
Hope	36.74	59.13	US 60 – Phoenix, Blythe	Eastern terminus
1.000 mi = 1.609 km; 1.000 km = 0.621 mi
