= Empire Flat, Arizona =

- Ghost town
- Location within Arizona Location within the United States
- Coordinates: 34°13′22″N 114°11′39″W
- Country: United States
- State: Arizona
- County: La Paz
- Founded: circa 1860
- Abandoned: circa 1905
- Elevation: 384 ft (117 m)
- Time zone: UTC-7 (MST (no DST))

Empire Flat was a steamboat landing at Empire Flat on the east shore of the Colorado River, within Parker Strip, Arizona, in La Paz County, Arizona.

== History ==
Empire Flat was the steamboat landing, 10 miles above Parker's Landing on the Colorado River. This landing was for the Empire Flat Mines of the Bill Williams Mining District and its mining camp, in the Buckskin Mountains above the landing, in what was then Yuma County, Arizona Territory. The landing, mining camp and mines are shown in an 1866 map made by Edward Fairman, of the Martin & Company properties at Empire Flat and its mines, Aubrey City, along the Bill Williams River and at the Mineral Hill Mines. The map shows the Empire Flat Mines where 9.2 miles by land south of Aubrey City, 10 miles to Empire Flat landing by the river. The 1866 map shows Empire Flat landing had a camp, a corral and an Ore House, and Mexican packers camp in its 160-acre bounds. Besides the camp, the mine had ore furnaces, blacksmith and engine house.

Later in the 1870s the landing had a five-stamp mill, to crush the gold-bearing copper ore, in a two-story open structure, a mess hall and a few huts for the mill hands.

The mines in this district were worked from the early 1860s into recent times. But the last steamboats called at the landing in 1905 after the Arizona and California Railway arrived and bridged the Colorado River at nearby Parker, Arizona.

== The site today ==
The site of the Empire Flat landing is within Parker Strip under the modern resorts there.
