= Cibola Bridge =

Bridge over the Colorado River

Coordinates: 33.4128076°N 114.6577346°W

Cibola Bridge is a bridge in La Paz County, in the U.S. state of Arizona, crossing the border between Arizona and California into Imperial County, in the U.S. state of California.
