= Cibola, Arizona =

CDP in La Paz County, Arizona

- Census-designated place
- Location in La Paz County and the state of Arizona

- Location in the United States
- Coordinates: 33°18′59″N 114°39′54″W
- Country: United States
- State: Arizona
- County: La Paz

Area
  - Total: 20.19 sq mi (52.29 km^{2})
  - Land: 19.52 sq mi (50.56 km^{2})
  - Water: 0.67 sq mi (1.73 km^{2})
- Elevation: 243 ft (74 m)

Population (2020)
  - Total: 198
  - Density: 10.2/sq mi (3.92/km^{2})
- Time zone: UTC-7 (MST (no DST))
- ZIP code: 85328
- Area code: 928
- FIPS code: 04-13470
- GNIS feature ID: 24371

Cibola is a census-designated place (CDP) in La Paz County, Arizona, United States. The population was 250 at the 2010 census, up from 172 in 2000. It is named for the famed city of gold of the same name.

== History ==
The town of Cibola formed in 1898, and construction began on a 16-mile canal to bring water from the river to the town.

== Geography ==
Cibola is located in southwestern La Paz County at 33°18′59″N 114°39′54″W (33.3164215, -114.6649570), in the Cibola Valley on the east side of the Colorado River. The community is bordered to the west, across the river, by the state of California. The river is crossed by River Road in the eastern part of the CDP; River Road leads south 2.5 miles (4.0 km) to Cibola Park in the center of the CDP, while to the north Neighbors Boulevard leads 8 miles (13 km) to Ripley, California. The northern end of Cibola National Wildlife Refuge occupies the southern part of the CDP.

According to the United States Census Bureau, the CDP has a total area of 20.2 square miles (52.3 km^{2}), of which 19.5 square miles (50.6 km^{2}) are land and 0.66 square miles (1.7 km^{2}), or 3.3%, are water.

=== Climate ===
This area has a large amount of sunshine year-round due to its stable descending air and high pressure. According to the Köppen Climate Classification system, Cibola has a desert climate, abbreviated "Bwh" on climate maps.

== Demographics ==
Historical population
Census	Pop.	Note	%±
2000	172		—
2010	250		45.3%
2020	198		−20.8%
U.S. Decennial Census

As of the census of 2000, there were 172 people, 65 households, and 39 families residing in the CDP. The population density was 9.5 inhabitants per square mile (3.7/km^{2}). There were 161 housing units at an average density of 8.9 per square mile (3.4/km^{2}). The racial makeup of the CDP was 76% White, 3% Black or African American, 6% Native American, 12% from other races, and 3% from two or more races. Hispanic or Latino of any race were 34% of the population.

There were 65 households, out of which 29% had children under the age of 18 living with them, 54% were married couples living together, 6% had a female householder with no husband present, and 39% were non-families. 28% of all households were made up of individuals, and 12% had someone living alone who was 65 years of age or older. The average household size was 2.7 and the average family size was 3.3.

In the CDP, the population was spread out, with 31% under the age of 18, 4% from 18 to 24, 25% from 25 to 44, 24% from 45 to 64, and 16% who were 65 years of age or older. The median age was 36 years. For every 100 females, there were 135.6 males. For every 100 females age 18 and over, there were 124.5 males.

The median income for a household in the CDP was $21,719, and the median income for a family was $43,250. Males had a median income of $60,313 versus $17,500 for females. The per capita income for the CDP was $15,772. None of the families and 13% of the population were living below the poverty line, including no under eighteens and 27% of those over 64.

== History ==
The population of Cibola was 20 in the 1960 census.

== Infrastructure ==
The Cibola Water Improvement District provides drinking water to Cibola.

== Cibola in popular culture ==
- Epitome of Far from Civilization, Paul Auster uses the town in his 1994 novel Mr. Vertigo.
