= Avi Suquilla Airport =

Airport in La Paz County, Arizona

- IATA: none; ICAO: none; FAA LID: P20

Summary
- Airport type: Public
- Owner: Colorado River Indian Tribes
- Operator: CRIT AIR
- Location: Parker, Arizona
- Elevation AMSL: 452 ft (138 m)
- Coordinates: 34°09′00″N 114°16′04″W

Map
- Location within Arizona Location within the United States

Runways
Direction	Length		Surface
Direction	ft	m	Surface
1/19	4,780	1,457	Asphalt

Statistics (2007)
- Aircraft operations: 10,200
- Based aircraft: 29
- Source: Federal Aviation Administration

Avi Suquilla Airport (FAA LID: P20) is a public use airport located 1.15 miles (1.00 nmi; 1.85 km) east of the central business district of Parker in an unincorporated area of La Paz County, Arizona, United States. It is owned by the Colorado River Indian Tribes. The airport is located near the Colorado River and serves many people who come into the area to make use of the river.

== Facilities and aircraft ==
Avi Suquilla Airport covers an area of 240 acres (97 ha) at an elevation of 452 feet (138 m) above mean sea level. It has one asphalt paved runway designated 1/19 which measures 4,780 by 75 feet (1,457 x 23 m).

For the 12-month period ending May 1, 2007, the airport had 10,200 aircraft operations, an average of 27 per day, all general aviation. At that time there were 29 aircraft based at this airport: 69% single-engine, 24% multi-engine and 7% helicopter. CRIT AIR is the fixed-base operator (FBO) on the field that takes care of fuel, unicom, parking, and other necessities.

== Activity ==
The airport does not have large carrier service at this time, but it does have a majority of general aviation aircraft on the field as well as two medical flight companies. Tri-State Careflight is the company that makes many of the medical flights in and out of Phoenix and Las Vegas to Parker; they fly the Beechcraft C90 King Air based on the field. TSCF has helicopters that operate in and out of P20 and also do the same type of flights as the fixed wing operations. The TSCF helicopters mostly "lift" from the La Paz Regional Hospital one mile west of the field. Omniflight, the parent company of Native Air, has recently begun operations regularly from P20 as well as the Parker Indian Hospital. As of now, there are no fixed wing operations operated by Native Air, but helicopter operation is spontaneous.

Currently, there is no activity that is a hindrance or a concern to pilots such as parachuting or glider activity, with the exception of sporadic military training operations.

== Expansion ==
An expansion project was recently completed, including a new runway measuring 6,250 feet (1,900 m) long by 100 feet (30 m) wide that can accommodate many different aircraft. On the new runway, there is one taxiway to exit approximately mid-field at A2. The old runway has been decommissioned and will later be overlaid and become another taxiway. More construction is continually going on that will make flying in easier and more enjoyable. There are future plans to update the fueling office and administration/pilots' lounge.

== See also ==
- List of airports in Arizona
