= Cienega Springs, Arizona =

CDP in La Paz County, Arizona

- Census-designated place
- Location of Cienega Springs in La Paz County, Arizona

- Location within Arizona Location within the United States
- Coordinates: 34°11′27″N 114°12′57″W
- Country: United States
- State: Arizona
- County: La Paz

Area
  - Total: 3.85 sq mi (9.98 km^{2})
  - Land: 3.55 sq mi (9.19 km^{2})
  - Water: 0.31 sq mi (0.79 km^{2})
- Elevation: 512 ft (156 m)

Population (2020)
  - Total: 1,690
  - Density: 476.2/sq mi (183.88/km^{2})
- Time zone: UTC-7 (Mountain (MST))
- ZIP code: 85344
- Area code: 928
- GNIS feature ID: 2582756
- FIPS code: 04-13540

Cienega Springs is a census-designated place in La Paz County, Arizona, United States. Its population was 1,690 as of the 2020 census.

== Geography ==
The community is in northwestern La Paz County, along the Colorado River. It is bordered to the southwest by the community of Bluewater and to the northwest, across the river, by the state of California. Arizona State Route 95 mostly forms the southeast edge of the Cienega Springs CDP. The highway leads southwest 4.5 miles (7.2 km) to Parker, the La Paz county seat, and northeast 11 miles (18 km) to Parker Dam on the Colorado River, forming Lake Havasu.

According to the U.S. Census Bureau, the Cienega Springs CDP has a total area of 3.85 square miles (9.96 km^{2}), of which 3.54 square miles (9.17 km^{2}) are land and 0.31 square miles (0.79 km^{2}), or 7.9%, are water.

== Infrastructure ==
=== Public safety ===
Cienga Springs is served by the Buckskin Fire District.

=== Utilities ===
Cienega Springs is served by the Cienga Water Company and the Buckskin Sanitary District.

== Demographics ==
Historical population
Census	Pop.	Note	%±
2020	1,690		—
U.S. Decennial Census

=== 2020 census ===
As of the 2020 census, Cienega Springs had a population of 1,690. The median age was 58.7 years. 10.1% of residents were under the age of 18 and 33.4% of residents were 65 years of age or older. For every 100 females there were 110.5 males, and for every 100 females age 18 and over there were 107.8 males age 18 and over.

90.5% of residents lived in urban areas, while 9.5% lived in rural areas.

There were 876 households in Cienega Springs, of which 14.7% had children under the age of 18 living in them. Of all households, 34.0% were married-couple households, 32.0% were households with a male householder and no spouse or partner present, and 25.3% were households with a female householder and no spouse or partner present. About 38.9% of all households were made up of individuals and 20.6% had someone living alone who was 65 years of age or older.

There were 2,091 housing units, of which 58.1% were vacant. The homeowner vacancy rate was 5.4% and the rental vacancy rate was 29.8%.

Racial composition as of the 2020 census
Race	Number	Percent
White	1,372	81.2%
Black or African American	11	0.7%
American Indian and Alaska Native	54	3.2%
Asian	17	1.0%
Native Hawaiian and Other Pacific Islander	0	0.0%
Some other race	91	5.4%
Two or more races	145	8.6%
Hispanic or Latino (of any race)	214	12.7%
