= Utting, Arizona =

Census-designated place in La Paz County, Arizona, United States

- Census-designated place
- Location in La Paz County, Arizona

- Location in Arizona and the United States Utting (the United States)
- Coordinates: 33°50′20″N 113°53′13″W
- Country: United States
- State: Arizona
- County: La Paz

Area
  - Total: 26.60 sq mi (68.89 km^{2})
  - Land: 26.60 sq mi (68.89 km^{2})
  - Water: 0 sq mi (0.00 km^{2})
- Elevation: 1,132 ft (345 m)

Population (2020)
  - Total: 92
  - Density: 3.5/sq mi (1.34/km^{2})
- Time zone: UTC-7 (Mountain (MST))
- ZIP code: 85325
- Area code: 928
- GNIS feature ID: 24669
- FIPS code: 04-78400

Utting is a census-designated place (CDP) in La Paz County, Arizona, United States. It is located along Arizona State Route 72 and the Arizona and California Railroad. As of the 2010 census, its population was 126. The community was named after Charles Horatio Utting, who fought with the Rough Riders in the Spanish–American War.

== Demographics ==
Historical population
Census	Pop.	Note	%±
2010	126		—
2020	92		−27.0%
U.S. Decennial Census

== See also ==
- List of census-designated places in Arizona
