= La Paz County, Arizona =

County in the United States

- County
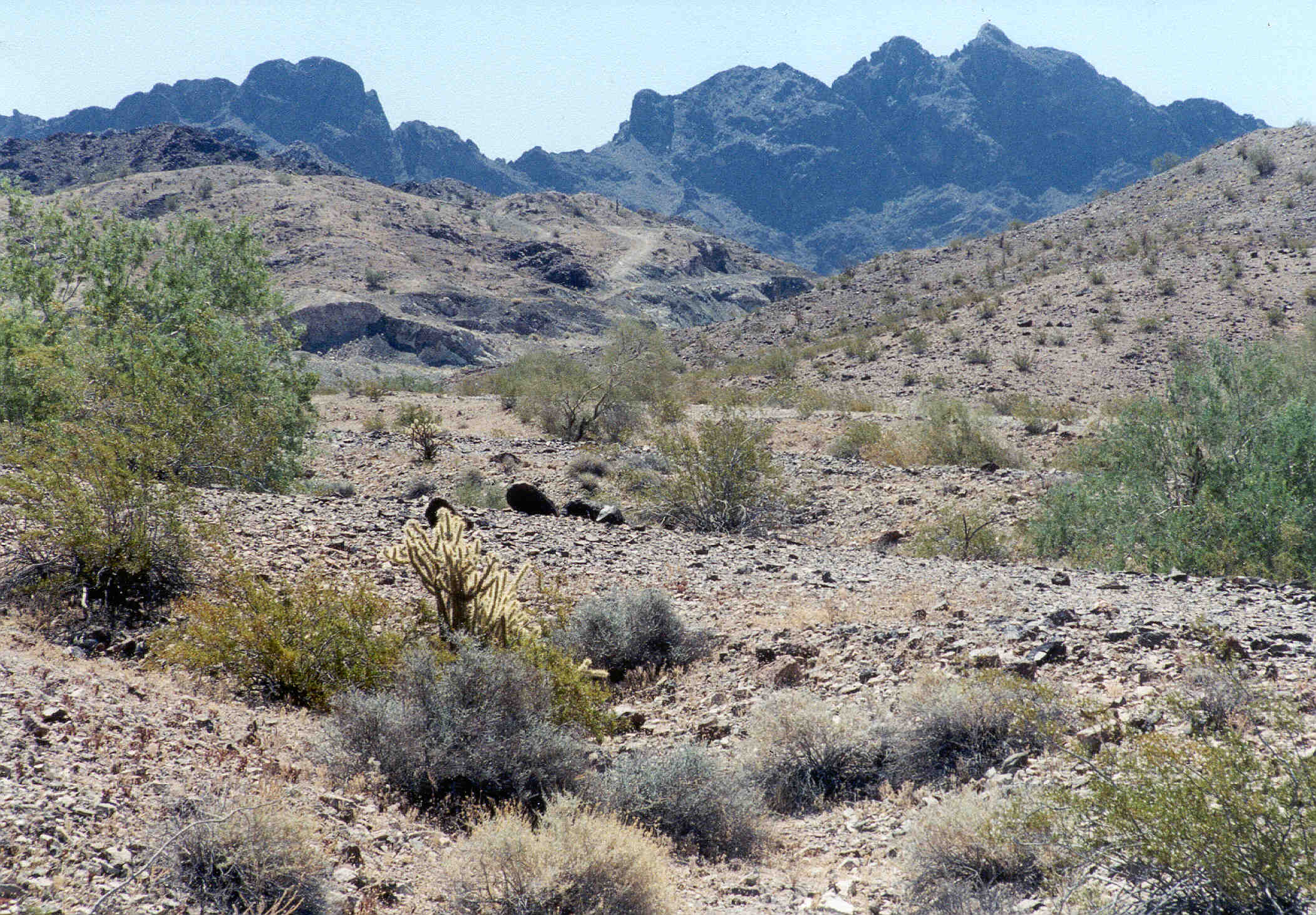
- Trigo Mountains

- Seal

- Location within the U.S. state of Arizona
- Coordinates: 33°50′25″N 113°56′34″W
- Country: United States
- State: Arizona
- Founded: January 1, 1983
- Named for: La Paz, Arizona
- Seat: Parker
- Largest town: Parker

Area
  - Total: 4,514 sq mi (11,690 km^{2})
  - Land: 4,500 sq mi (12,000 km^{2})
  - Water: 14 sq mi (36 km^{2}) 0.3%

Population (2020)
  - Total: 16,557
  - Estimate (2025): 16,711 ▲
  - Density: 3.7/sq mi (1.4/km^{2})
- Time zone: UTC−7 (Mountain)
- Congressional district: 9th
- Website: www.lapaz.gov

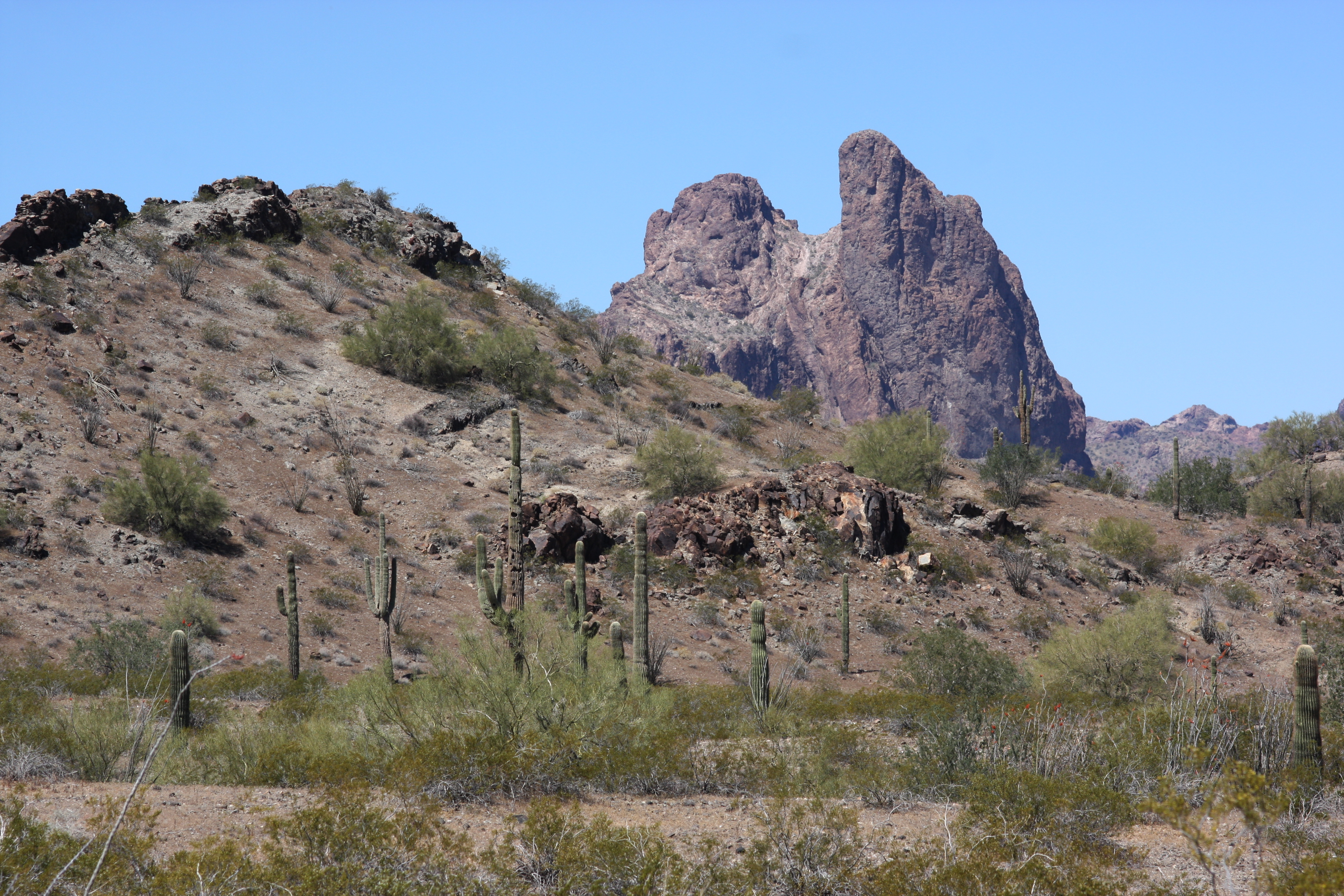
Courthouse Rock in the Eagletail Mountains, northeastern La Paz County

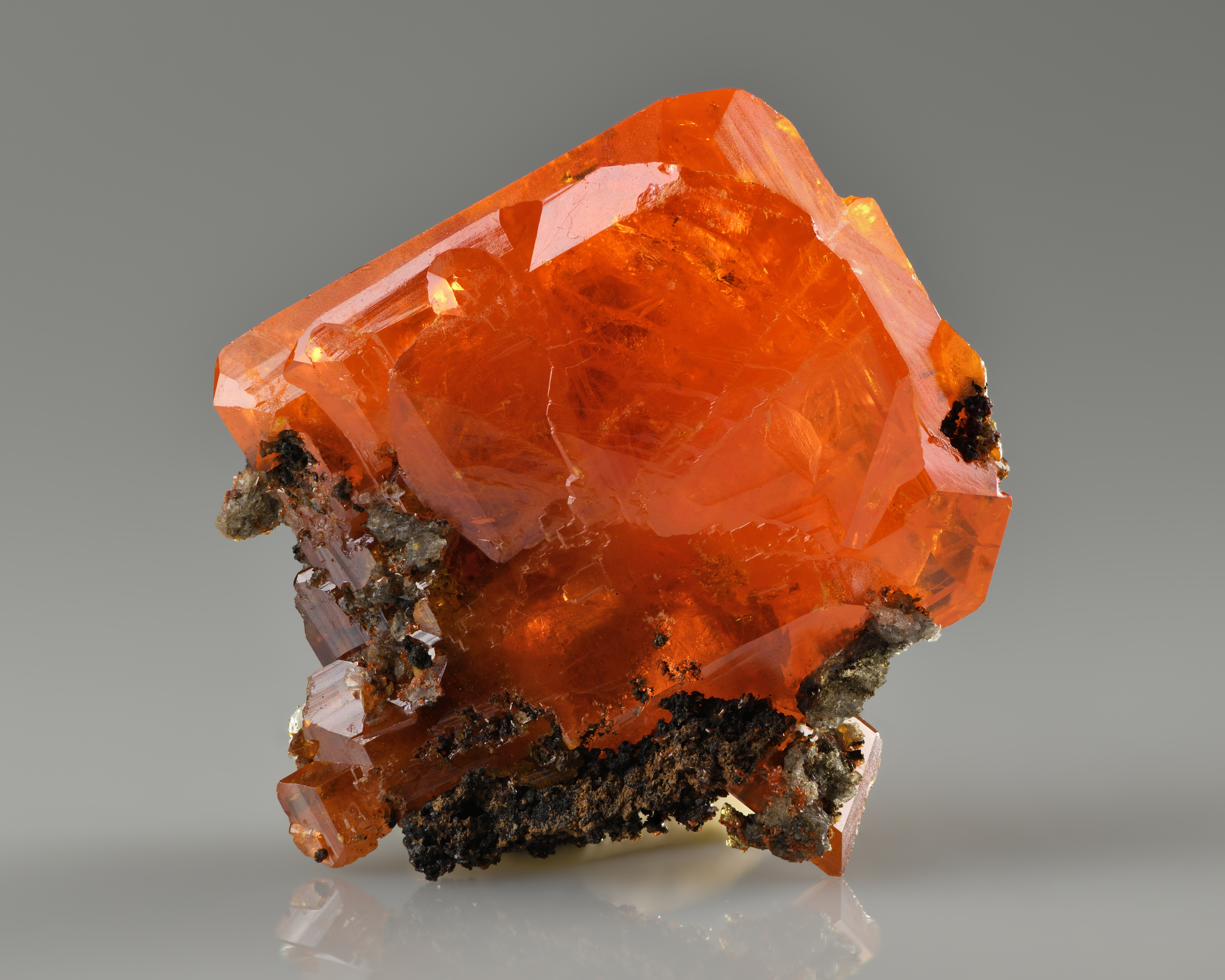
Classic wulfenite specimen from the old Red Cloud Mine, western La Paz County

La Paz County (Spanish: Condado de La Paz) is the 15th county in the U.S. state of Arizona, located in the western part of the state. As of the 2020 census, its population was 16,557, making it the second-least populous county in Arizona. The county seat is Parker. The name of the county is the Spanish word for "the peace", and is taken from the early settlement (later ghost town) of La Paz along the Colorado River.

== History ==
La Paz County was established in 1983 after voters approved separating the northern portion of Yuma County, making it the only county to be established after Arizona became a state in 1912, and currently the second youngest county in the United States (behind the consolidated city-county of Broomfield, Colorado, which was established in 2001). The county did not have a large enough tax base to begin supporting a separate county government immediately and had to rely on state money at first. As a result, the Arizona State Legislature changed Arizona laws to make splitting other existing counties much more difficult.

Under the revised Arizona laws, a county shall not be formed or divided by county initiative unless each proposed county would have all of the following characteristics: (1) at least three-fourths of one percent of the total state assessed valuation and at least the statewide per capita assessed valuation; (2) a population of at least three-fourths of one percent of the total state population according to the most recent United States decennial census; (3) at least one hundred square miles of privately owned land; (4) common boundaries with either (a) at least three other existing or proposed counties; or (b) at least two other existing or proposed counties and the state boundary. A county formation commission is required to be formed to evaluate the feasibility of the proposed county. A proposal to divide a county must be approved by a majority of the votes cast in each proposed new county. Yet in 2022 a group of Republican state legislators, motivated largely by partisan considerations, proposed dividing Maricopa County into four counties.

The Colorado River Indian Reservation is located in the western portion of the county. Part of the reservation extends westward into San Bernardino and Riverside counties in California.

== Geography ==
According to the United States Census Bureau, the county has a total area of 4,514 mi^{2} (11,690 km^{2}), of which 4,500 mi^{2} (12,000 km^{2}) is land and 14 mi^{2} (36 km^{2}) (0.3%) is water.

The area that now makes up La Paz County was formerly part of Yuma County.

=== Flora and fauna ===
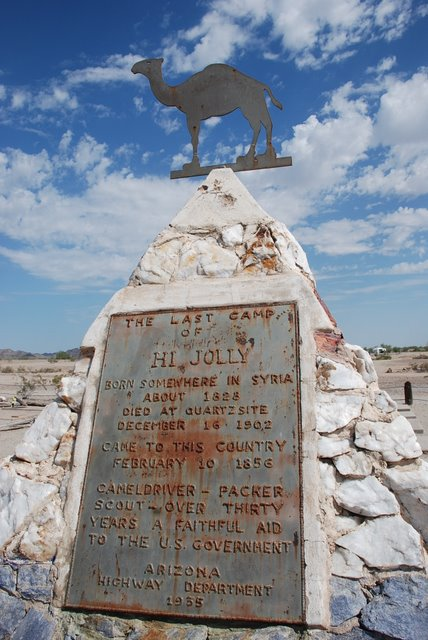
Hi Jolly monument near Quartzsite

La Paz County hosts a variety of flora and fauna. The endangered California Fan Palm Washingtonia filifera grows in a few spots in the county.

=== Adjacent counties ===
- Mohave County – north
- Yavapai County – northeast
- Maricopa County – east
- Yuma County – south
- Imperial County, California – southwest
- Riverside County, California – west
- San Bernardino County, California – northwest

=== National protected areas ===
- Bill Williams River National Wildlife Refuge (part)
- Cibola National Wildlife Refuge (part)
- Imperial National Wildlife Refuge (part)
- Kofa National Wildlife Refuge (part)

== Demographics ==
Historical population
Census	Pop.	Note	%±
1990	13,844		—
2000	19,715		42.4%
2010	20,489		3.9%
2020	16,557		−19.2%
2025 (est.)	16,711	▲	0.9%
U.S. Decennial Census; 1990–2000 2010–2020

=== Racial and ethnic composition ===
La Paz County, Arizona – Racial and ethnic composition Note: the US Census treats Hispanic/Latino as an ethnic category. This table excludes Latinos from the racial categories and assigns them to a separate category. Hispanics/Latinos may be of any race.
Race / Ethnicity (NH = Non-Hispanic)	2020	2010	2000	1990
White alone (NH)	54.7% (9,061)	62.7% (12,854)	63.8% (12,573)	61.4% (8,495)
Black alone (NH)	0.6% (102)	0.6% (115)	0.8% (149)	0.7% (103)
American Indian alone (NH)	14.2% (2,534)	10.7% (2,201)	10.9% (2,155)	14.5% (2,005)
Asian alone (NH)	0.7% (111)	0.4% (90)	0.4% (78)	0.6% (83)
Pacific Islander alone (NH)	0.3% (41)	0% (5)	0.1% (9)	
Other race alone (NH)	0.3% (43)	0.1% (11)	0.1% (18)	0.1% (19)
Multiracial (NH)	3.9% (648)	2% (407)	1.6% (313)	—
Hispanic/Latino (any race)	25.4% (4,197)	23.5% (4,806)	22.4% (4,420)	22.7% (3,139)

=== American Community Survey 2025 data ===
The United States Census Bureau estimated that in 2025, La Paz County’s population was 16.711. It was also estimated that the county's population was 51,93% Non-Hispanic White, 27,78% Hispanic or Latino, 1,04% Non-Hispanic Black, 2,09% Asian, 13,23% Native American, 0,23% Pacific Islander, and 3,70% Multiracial.

Total	Population	Percentage
Non-Hispanic White	8.678	51,93%
Hispanic or Latino	4.643	27,78%
Non-Hispanic Black	173	1,04%
Asian	349	2,09%
Native American	2.211	13,23%
Pacific Islander	38	0,23%
Non-Hispanic Multiracial	619	3,70%

=== 2020 census ===
As of the 2020 census, the county had a population of 16,557. Of the residents, 18.4% were under the age of 18 and 33.7% were 65 years of age or older; the median age was 54.6 years. For every 100 females there were 103.3 males, and for every 100 females age 18 and over there were 103.2 males. 56.6% of residents lived in urban areas and 43.4% lived in rural areas.

The racial makeup of the county was 59.0% White, 0.7% Black or African American, 17.1% American Indian and Alaska Native, 0.7% Asian, 0.3% Native Hawaiian and Pacific Islander, 9.7% from some other race, and 12.4% from two or more races. Hispanic or Latino residents of any race comprised 25.3% of the population.

There were 7,370 households in the county, of which 20.7% had children under the age of 18 living with them and 26.3% had a female householder with no spouse or partner present. About 34.6% of all households were made up of individuals and 20.8% had someone living alone who was 65 years of age or older.

There were 13,457 housing units, of which 45.2% were vacant. Among occupied housing units, 71.8% were owner-occupied and 28.2% were renter-occupied. The homeowner vacancy rate was 2.7% and the rental vacancy rate was 15.7%.

=== 2010 census ===
As of the census of 2010, there were 20,489 people, 9,198 households, and 5,584 families living in the county. The population density was 4.5//sq mi (1.8/km^{2}). There were 16,049 housing units at an average density of 3.56 units per square mile (1.37 units/km^{2}). The racial makeup of the county was 69.8% white, 12.8% American Indian, 0.6% black or African American, 0.5% Asian, 12.5% from other races, and 3.7% from two or more races. Those of Hispanic or Latino origin made up 23.5% of the population. In terms of ancestry, 22.4% were German, 15.9% were Irish, 15.3% were English, and 2.1% were American.

Of the 9,198 households, 19.3% had children under the age of 18 living with them, 47.2% were married couples living together, 9.4% had a female householder with no husband present, 39.3% were non-families, and 32.1% of all households were made up of individuals. The average household size was 2.19 and the average family size was 2.72. The median age was 53.9 years.

The median income for a household in the county was $32,147 and the median income for a family was $37,721. Males had a median income of $35,464 versus $27,484 for females. The per capita income for the county was $21,165. About 14.3% of families and 20.3% of the population were below the poverty line, including 36.4% of those under age 18 and 6.5% of those age 65 or over.

=== 2000 census ===
As of the census of 2000, there were 19,715 people, 8,362 households, and 5,619 families living in the county. The population density was 4.4 people per square mile (1.7 people/km^{2}). There were 15,133 housing units at an average density of 3.4 units per square mile (1.3 units/km^{2}). The racial makeup of the county was 74.2% white, 0.8% black or African American, 12.5% Native American, 0.4% Asian, 0.1% Pacific Islander, 9.4% from other races, and 2.7% from two or more races. 22.4% of the population were Hispanic or Latino of any race. 18.9% reported speaking Spanish at home.

There were 8,362 households, with 21.2% having children under the age of 18, 54.2% were married couples living together, 8.2% had a female householder with no husband present, and 32.8% were non-families. 26.6% of households were made up of individuals, and 12.9% had someone living alone who was 65 years of age or older. The average household size was 2.32 and the average family size was 2.79.

The county population had 21.1% under the age of 18, 6.1% from 18 to 24, 20.4% from 25 to 44, 26.6% from 45 to 64, and 25.8% who were 65 years of age or older. The median age was 47 years. For every 100 females there were 105.50 males. For every 100 females age 18 and over, there were 105.10 males.

The median income for a household in the county was $25,839, and the median income for a family was $29,141. Males had a median income of $26,642 versus $20,965 for females. The per capita income for the county was $14,916. About 13.6% of families and 19.60% of the population were below the poverty line, including 28.5% of those under age 18 and 12.9% of those age 65 or over.

== Law enforcement ==
La Paz County Sheriff's Office
- Patch of La Paz County Sheriff's Office
- Abbreviation: LPCSO

Agency overview
- Formed: 1983; 43 years ago

Jurisdictional structure
- General nature: Local civilian police

Operational structure
- Headquarters: Parker, Arizona
- Agency executive: William Ponce, Sheriff

Website
- La Paz County Sheriff

The La Paz County Sheriff's Office provides general-service law enforcement to unincorporated areas of La Paz County, serving as the equivalent of the police for unincorporated areas of the county. It also operates the county jail system. The Sheriff's Office is headquartered in Parker.

Past sheriffs are:

- Rayburn Evans (1983–88)
- Marvin Hare (1989–2000)
- Daniel "Hal" Collett (2001–08)
- Donald Lowery (2009–12)
- John Drum (2013–16)
- William Risen (2017-2020)
- William Ponce (2021–Present)

== Politics ==
La Paz County has been a strongly Republican county since the county's formation although Bill Clinton was able to win the county in both of his elections.

United States presidential election results for La Paz County, Arizona
Year	Republican		Democratic		Third party(ies)	
Year	No.	%	No.	%	No.	%
1984	2,757	63.92%	1,502	34.82%	54	1.25%
1988	2,562	57.24%	1,746	39.01%	168	3.75%
1992	1,599	32.23%	1,808	36.44%	1,554	31.32%
1996	1,902	42.33%	1,964	43.71%	627	13.96%
2000	2,543	56.73%	1,769	39.46%	171	3.81%
2004	3,158	62.42%	1,849	36.55%	52	1.03%
2008	3,509	62.92%	1,929	34.59%	139	2.49%
2012	3,714	64.76%	1,880	32.78%	141	2.46%
2016	4,003	67.27%	1,575	26.47%	373	6.27%
2020	5,129	68.75%	2,236	29.97%	95	1.27%
2024	5,470	71.73%	2,101	27.55%	55	0.72%

== Transportation ==
=== Major highways ===
- Interstate 10
- U.S. Route 60
- U.S. Route 95
- State Route 72
- State Route 95

=== Air ===
Avi Suquilla Airport (FAA LID: P20) is a public use airport located one nautical mile (1.9 km) east of the central business district of Parker, Arizona. It is owned by the Colorado River Indian Tribes.

=== Rail ===
The county is served by the Arizona and California Railroad for freight through Parker, Arizona.

== Communities ==
Map of La Paz County showing Indian reservation, incorporated areas, and unincorporated area

=== Towns ===
- Parker (county seat)
- Quartzsite

=== Census-designated places ===
- Alamo Lake
- Bluewater
- Bouse
- Brenda
- Cibola
- Cienega Springs
- Ehrenberg
- La Paz Valley
- Parker Strip
- Poston
- Salome
- Sunwest
- Utting
- Vicksburg
- Wenden

=== Unincorporated communities ===
- Hope
- Love

=== Ghost towns ===
- Clip
- Drift Desert
- Empire Flat
- Eureka
- La Paz
- Mineral City
- Nortons Landing
- Olive City
- Swansea
- Williamsport

=== Indian communities ===
Colorado River Indian Reservation

=== County population ranking ===
The population ranking of the following table is based on the 2020 census of La Paz County.

† county seat

Rank	City/Town/etc.	Population (2020 Census)	Municipal type	Incorporated
1	† Parker	3,417	Town	1948
2	Quartzsite	2,413	Town	1989
3	Cienega Springs	1,690	CDP	
4	Salome	1,162	CDP	
5	Ehrenburg	763	CDP	
6	Bouse	707	CDP	
7	Bluewater	682	CDP	
8	Parker Strip	621	CDP	
9	Brenda	466	CDP	
10	Wenden	458	CDP	
11	Vicksburg	418	CDP	
12	La Paz Valley	368	CDP	
13	Cibola	198	CDP	
14	Poston	183	CDP	
15	Utting	92	CDP	
16	Sunwest	5	CDP	
17	Alamo Lake	4	CDP	

== See also ==
- National Register of Historic Places listings in La Paz County, Arizona
