= Alamo Lake, Arizona =

CDP in La Paz County, Arizona

- Census-designated place
- Location of Alamo Lake in La Paz County, Arizona

- Location within Arizona Location within the United States
- Coordinates: 34°15′32″N 113°30′28″W
- Country: United States
- State: Arizona
- County: La Paz

Area
  - Total: 46.56 sq mi (120.59 km^{2})
  - Land: 43.95 sq mi (113.82 km^{2})
  - Water: 2.62 sq mi (6.78 km^{2})
- Elevation: 1,316 ft (401 m)

Population (2020)
  - Total: 4
  - Density: 0.10/sq mi (0.04/km^{2})
- Time zone: UTC-7 (Mountain (MST))
- Area code: 928
- GNIS feature ID: 2582722
- FIPS code: 04-01170

Alamo Lake is a census-designated place in La Paz County, Arizona, United States. Its population was 4 as of the 2020 census. The community includes Alamo Lake State Park.

== Demographics ==
Historical population
Census	Pop.	Note	%±
2010	25		—
2020	4		−84.0%
U.S. Decennial Census

Alamo Lake first appeared on the 2010 U.S. Census as a census-designated place (CDP). With 25 residents, it is the second-smallest community in La Paz County after Sunwest.
