= La Paz Valley, Arizona =

CDP in La Paz County, Arizona

- Census-designated place (CDP)
- Location of La Paz Valley in La Paz County, Arizona

- Location within Arizona Location within the United States
- Coordinates: 33°33′30″N 114°15′02″W
- Country: United States
- State: Arizona
- County: La Paz

Area
  - Total: 29.37 sq mi (76.06 km^{2})
  - Land: 29.37 sq mi (76.06 km^{2})
  - Water: 0 sq mi (0.00 km^{2})
- Elevation: 1,056 ft (322 m)

Population (2020)
  - Total: 368
  - Density: 12.5/sq mi (4.84/km^{2})
- Time zone: UTC-7 (Mountain (MST))
- ZIP code: 85346
- Area code: 928
- GNIS feature ID: 2582813
- FIPS code: 04-40160

La Paz Valley is a census-designated place (CDP) in La Paz County, Arizona, United States. Its population was 368 as of the 2020 census. The community is in western La Paz County and is bordered to the north by the town of Quartzsite. To the south it is bordered by Yuma County.

U.S. Route 95 forms the eastern border of the CDP and runs north into Quartzsite and south 76 miles (122 km) to Yuma. The Town of Quartzsite operates demand response buses under the name Camel Express that provide weekday service to Quartzsite and La Paz Valley.

== Demographics ==
Historical population
Census	Pop.	Note	%±
2020	368		—
U.S. Decennial Census
