= Sunwest, Arizona =

CDP in La Paz County, Arizona

- Census-designated place
- Location in La Paz County, Arizona

- Location within Arizona Location within the United States
- Coordinates: 33°38′24″N 113°23′30″W
- Country: United States
- State: Arizona
- County: La Paz

Area
  - Total: 24.25 sq mi (62.80 km^{2})
  - Land: 24.25 sq mi (62.80 km^{2})
  - Water: 0 sq mi (0.00 km^{2})
- Elevation: 1,503 ft (458 m)

Population (2020)
  - Total: 5
  - Density: 0.21/sq mi (0.08/km^{2})
- Time zone: UTC-7 (Mountain (MST))
- Area code: 928
- GNIS feature ID: 2582873
- FIPS code: 04-71220

Sunwest is a census-designated place in La Paz County, Arizona, United States. Its population was 5 as of the 2020 census.

== Demographics ==
Historical population
Census	Pop.	Note	%±
2020	5		—
U.S. Decennial Census
