= Brenda, Arizona =

Census-designated place in La Paz County, Arizona, United States

- Census-designated place
- Location of Brenda in La Paz County, Arizona

- Location within Arizona Location within the United States
- Coordinates: 33°40′20″N 113°56′16″W
- Country: United States
- State: Arizona
- County: La Paz

Area
  - Total: 6.91 sq mi (17.90 km^{2})
  - Land: 6.91 sq mi (17.90 km^{2})
  - Water: 0 sq mi (0.00 km^{2})
- Elevation: 1,378 ft (420 m)

Population (2020)
  - Total: 466
  - Density: 67.4/sq mi (26.04/km^{2})
- Time zone: UTC-7 (Mountain (MST))
- Area code: 928
- GNIS feature ID: 2582740
- FIPS code: 04-07590

Brenda is a census-designated place (CDP) in La Paz County, Arizona, United States.

== Description ==
The community is located approximately 16 kilometres (9.9 mi) east of Quartzsite and 4 miles (6 km) northeast of Interstate 10 on U.S. Route 60 (US 60). Its population was 466 as of the 2020 census. The community lies 5 miles (8 km) east of the Plomosa Mountains, and it is the closest community to the New Water Mountains Wilderness, five air miles to the south. Brenda is four miles northeast of the western terminus of US 60 (the last community on the highway westbound).

== Demographics ==
Historical population
| Census | Pop. | Note | %± |
|---|---|---|---|
| 2010 | 676 | | — |
| 2020 | 466 | | −31.1% |
U.S. Decennial Census

Brenda first appeared on the 2010 U.S. Census as a census-designated place (CDP).

== Infrastructure ==
The Desert Shadows Domestic Water Improvement District serves part of Brenda.

== See also ==
- List of census-designated places in Arizona
