= Parker Strip, Arizona =

CDP in La Paz County, Arizona

- Census-designated place
- Location in La Paz County and the state of Arizona

- Location in the United States
- Coordinates: 34°16′05″N 114°08′04″W
- Country: United States
- State: Arizona
- County: La Paz

Area
  - Total: 4.16 sq mi (10.78 km^{2})
  - Land: 3.13 sq mi (8.10 km^{2})
  - Water: 1.03 sq mi (2.68 km^{2})
- Elevation: 456 ft (139 m)

Population (2020)
  - Total: 621
  - Density: 198.5/sq mi (76.65/km^{2})
- Time zone: UTC-7 (MST (no DST))
- ZIP code: 85344
- Area code: 928
- FIPS code: 04-53210
- GNIS feature ID: 2409030

Parker Strip is a census-designated place (CDP) in La Paz County, Arizona, United States. The population was 662 at the 2010 census.

== Geography ==
Parker Strip is located in the northwest corner of La Paz County. It lies along the Colorado River and includes Parker Dam, which forms Lake Havasu. To the northwest, across the Colorado River, is San Bernardino County, California, and to the north, across an arm of Lake Havasu formed by the Bill Williams River, is Mohave County.

Arizona State Route 95 runs through the length of Parker Strip, leading north 23 miles (37 km) to Lake Havasu City and southwest 15 miles (24 km) to Parker.

According to the United States Census Bureau, the Parker Strip CDP has a total area of 4.2 square miles (10.8 km^{2}), of which 3.1 square miles (8.1 km^{2}) are land and 1.0 square mile (2.7 km^{2}), or 24.86%, are water.

== Demographics ==
Historical population
| Census | Pop. | Note | %± |
|---|---|---|---|
| 2000 | 3,302 | | — |
| 2010 | 662 | | −80.0% |
| 2020 | 621 | | −6.2% |
U.S. Decennial Census

As of the census of 2000, there were 3,302 people, 1,589 households, and 953 families residing in the CDP. The population density was 464.8 inhabitants per square mile (179.5/km^{2}). There were 4,925 housing units at an average density of 693.3 per square mile (267.7/km^{2}). The racial makeup of the CDP was 92.6% White, 0.6% Black or African American, 2.0% Native American, 0.8% Asian, 2.2% from other races, and 1.8% from two or more races. Hispanic or Latino of any race were 9.1% of the population.

There were 1,589 households, out of which 16.2% had children under the age of 18 living with them, 51.0% were married couples living together, 5.0% had a female householder with no husband present, and 40.0% were non-families. 31.4% of all households were made up of individuals, and 11.3% had someone living alone who was 65 years of age or older. The average household size was 2.08 and the average family size was 2.57.

In the CDP, the population was spread out, with 16.0% under the age of 18, 4.9% from 18 to 24, 22.5% from 25 to 44, 34.3% from 45 to 64, and 22.3% who were 65 years of age or older. The median age was 50 years. For every 100 females, there were 110.3 males. For every 100 females age 18 and over, there were 110.7 males.

The median income for a household in the CDP was $33,675, and the median income for a family was $38,139. Males had a median income of $34,924 versus $23,614 for females. The per capita income for the CDP was $21,675. About 10.9% of families and 15.9% of the population were below the poverty line, including 25.5% of those under age 18 and 14.8% of those age 65 or over.

== Utilities ==
Parker Strip is served by the Buckskin Sanitary District.

=== Public safety ===
Parker Strip is served by the Buckskin Fire District.
