= Cibola National Wildlife Refuge =

U.S. National Wildlife Refuge

- IUCN category IV (habitat/species management area)
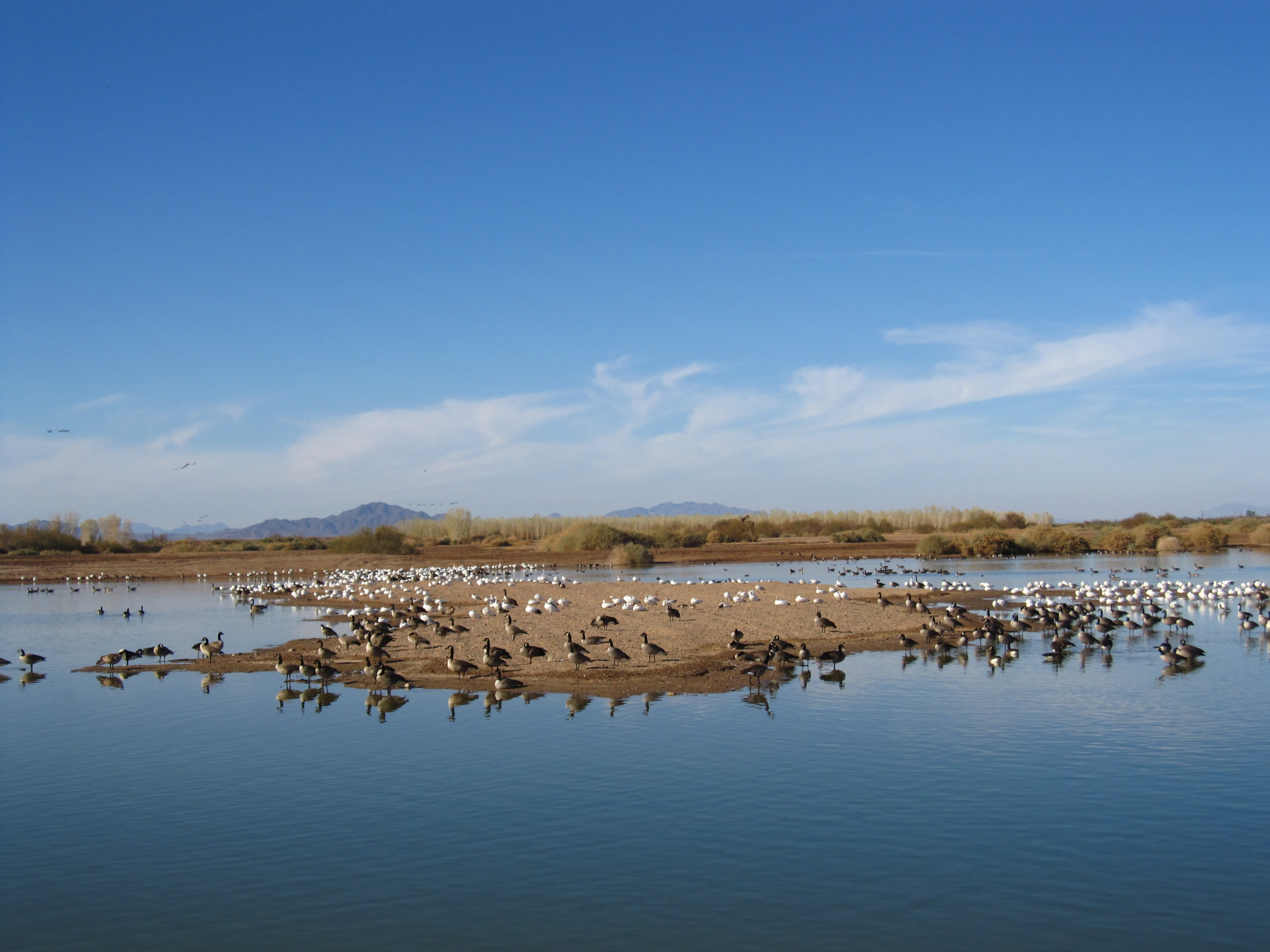

- Location within the United States
- Location: La Paz County, Arizona / Imperial County, California, United States
- Nearest city: Palo Verde, California
- Coordinates: 33.3116995°N 114.6891244°W
- Area: 16,627 acres (67.29 km^{2})
- Established: 1964
- Governing body: U.S. Fish and Wildlife Service
- Website: Cibola National Wildlife Refuge

Cibola National Wildlife Refuge is a U.S. National Wildlife Refuge in the floodplain of the lower Colorado River between Arizona and California and surrounded by a fringe of desert ridges and washes. The refuge encompasses both the historic Colorado River channel as well as a channelized portion constructed in the late 1960s. Along with these main waterbodies, several important backwaters are home to many wildlife species that reside in this Yuma Desert portion of the Sonoran Desert. Because of the river's life-sustaining water, wildlife here survive in an environment that reaches 120 °F (49 °C) in the summer and receives an average of only 2 inches (5.1 cm) of rain per year.

== Ecological importance ==
The Refuge is one of the last major stop overs of the Pacific Flyway for migratory birds. Over 250 species of birds have been identified at Cibola NWR, including Canada geese, golden eagles, great blue herons, sandhill cranes, snowy egrets, and the endangered southwestern willow flycatcher. Other species that inhabit the area include mule deer, Gambel's quail, bobcat, and coyote.

== Conservation ==
Cibola NWR undertakes major projects annually including the conservation of a desert pupfish population, one of three that exist in Arizona.

Invasive species removal enhances the natural riparian habitat and provides hunting opportunities. In return, populations are regulated, and the sustainability of the ecosystem is maintained.
