= Parker, Arizona =

Town in Arizona

- Town
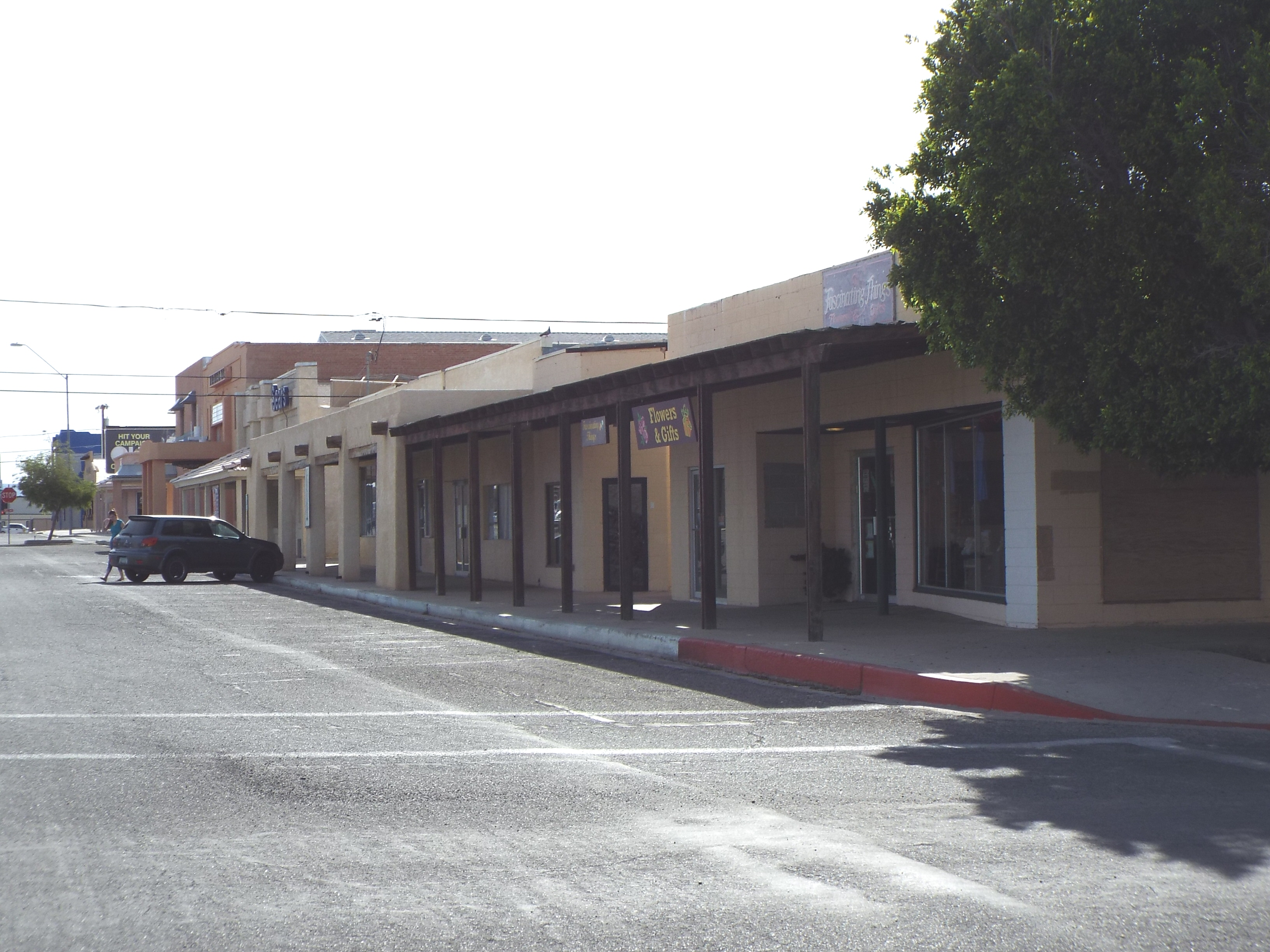
- Historic Downtown Parker

- Flag Seal

- Location of Parker in La Paz County, Arizona

- Location in the United States
- Coordinates: 34°04′41″N 114°15′23″W
- Country: United States
- State: Arizona
- County: La Paz
- Named for: Ely S. Parker

Government
  - Mayor: Randy Hartless

Area
  - Total: 21.99 sq mi (56.95 km^{2})
  - Land: 21.98 sq mi (56.92 km^{2})
  - Water: 0.012 sq mi (0.03 km^{2})
- Elevation: 764 ft (233 m)

Population (2020 census)
  - Total: 3,417
  - Density: 155.5/sq mi (60.03/km^{2})
- Time zone: UTC-7 (MST (no DST))
- ZIP code: 85344
- Area code: 928
- FIPS code: 04-53070
- GNIS feature ID: 2413116
- Website: Town Website

Parker (Mojave 'Amat Kuhwely, formerly 'Ahwe Nyava) is a town in and the county seat of La Paz County, Arizona, United States, on the Colorado River in Parker Valley. As of the 2020 census, the population of the city was 3,417.

== History ==
Founded in 1908, the town was named after Ely Parker, the first Native American commissioner for the U.S. government. The original town site of Parker was surveyed and laid out in 1909 by Earl H. Parker, a railroad location engineer for the Arizona & California Railway. The town officially incorporated in 1948 and became the county seat for the newly created La Paz County on January 1, 1983.

=== Camp Colorado and Parkers Landing ===
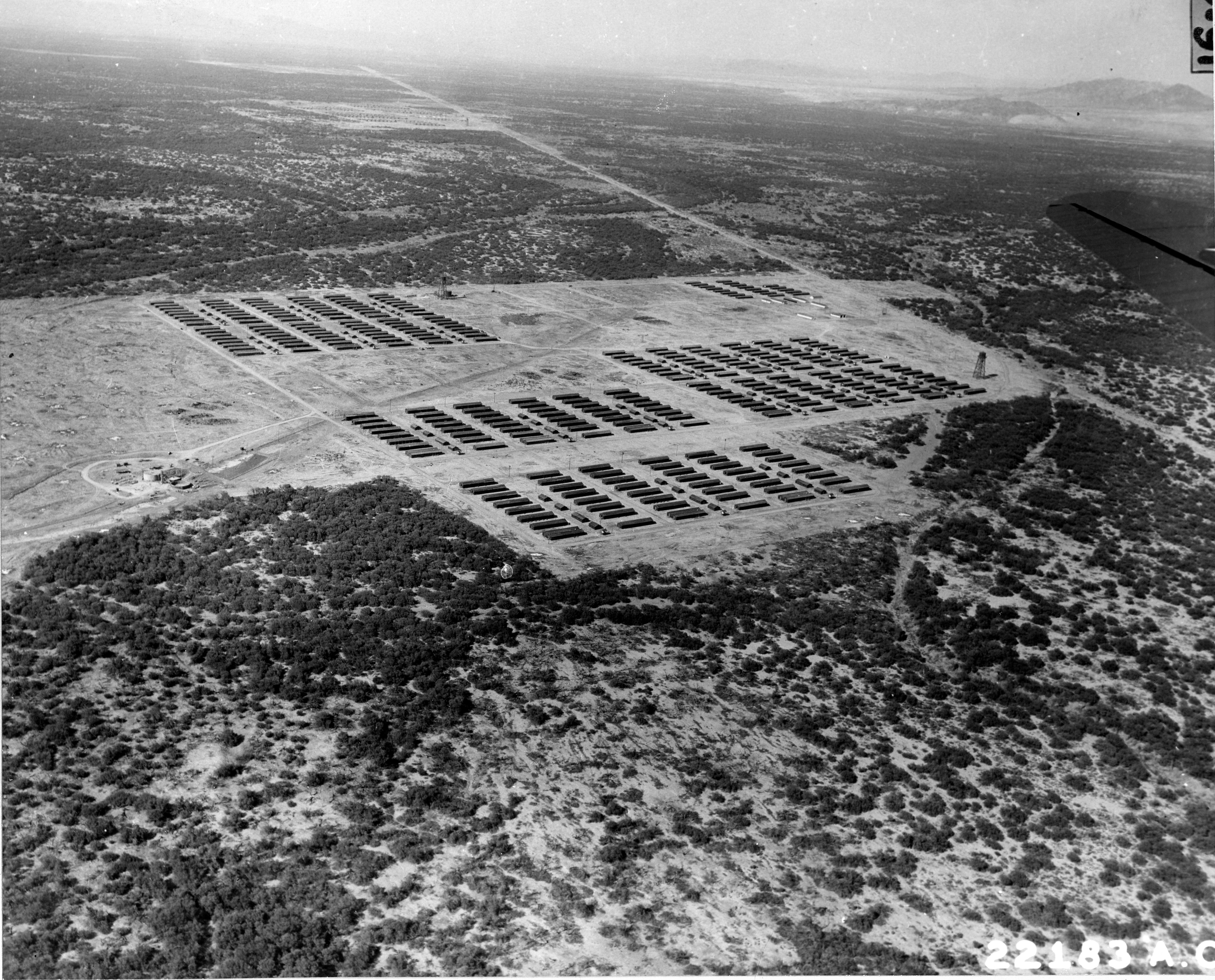

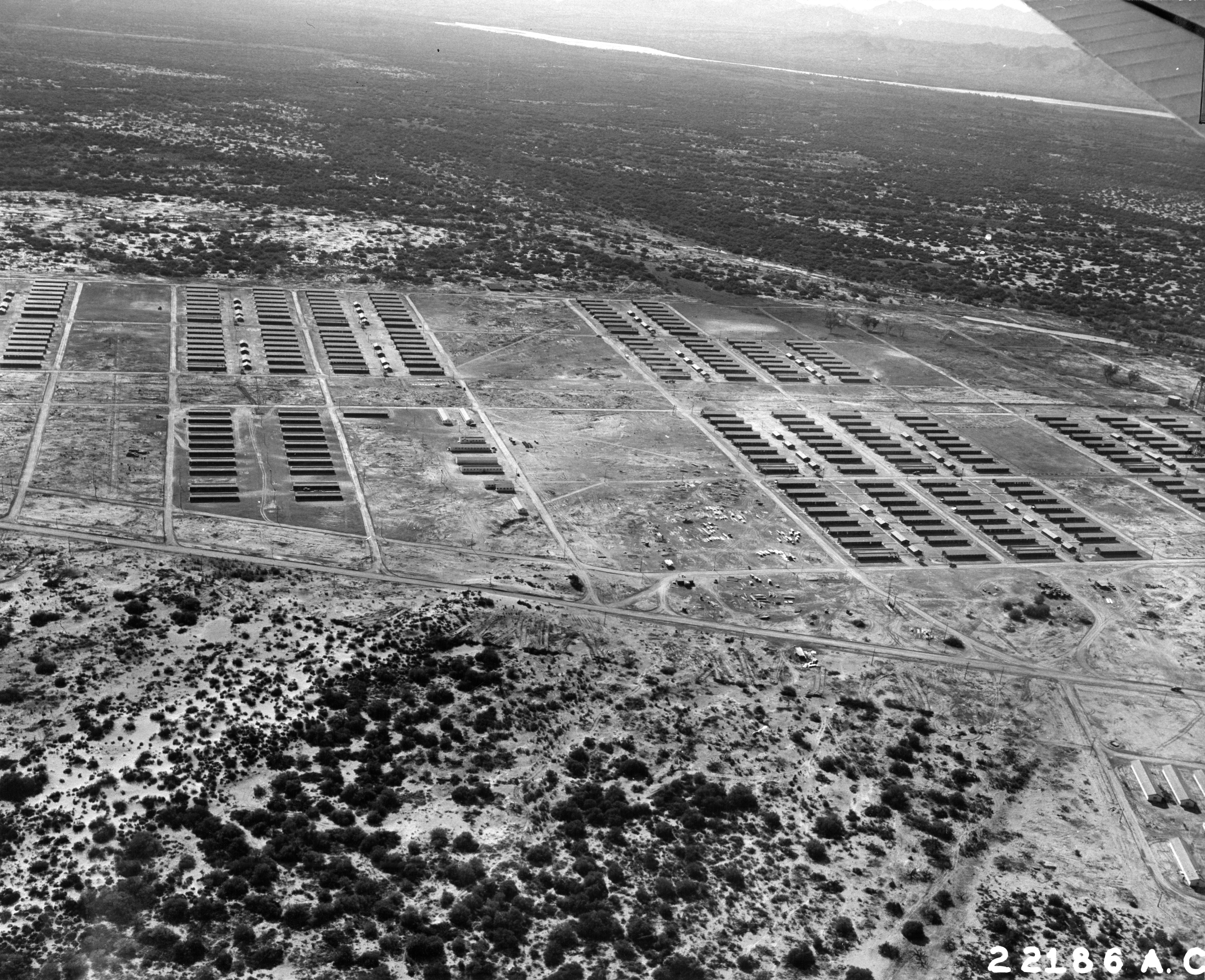

The town's name and origin began when a post office called Parker was established January 6, 1871, at Parker's Landing and the site of the Parker Indian Agency, named for Ely Parker, on the Colorado River Indian Reservation, four miles downriver from the site of the railroad bridge of the modern town, to serve the Indian agency. What became Parkers Landing was established on the river as the place to land and pick up cargo and personnel for the Indian Agency and the U. S. Army detachment that was stationed there at Camp Colorado from 1864 to 1869, during the first years of the Reservation. Camp Colorado was abandoned after sparks from the departing steamboat Cocopah rapidly burned down the brush huts of the officers of the garrison, and endangered its barracks and storehouses.

== Geography ==
The city is on the Colorado River just south of the Headgate Rock Dam and Moovalya Lake. Arizona State Route 95 and California State Route 62 (across the Colorado River) serve the city.

According to the United States Census Bureau, the town has a total area of 22.0 square miles (57 km^{2}), of which 22.0 square miles (57 km^{2}) is land and 0.05% is water.

According to Census Bureau maps, the town is divided into two non-contiguous sections; the northern section consists of the original town and is located in the Colorado River Indian reservation and the southern section consists of a larger, roughly rectangular section of largely undeveloped territory. The undeveloped territory consist of extensive unpaved roads. Of the few that are paved, Mohave Road is the most utilized between the town and the territory. The same road can be taken 15.5 miles south to the town of Poston, which is noted for its relocation camps for Japanese Americans during World War II.

== Climate ==
Parker has an arid climate classification, which is characterized by extremely hot summers and warm winters.

Wintertime highs in Parker are generally in the upper 60s to lower 70s. Lows during the winter are between 40 and 50 °F (4.4 and 10.0 °C) with an occasional morning dipping below 32 °F (0 °C). The all-time lowest recorded temperature in Parker occurred on December 31, 1911, when temperatures bottomed out at 9 °F (−12.8 °C); however, snow has been recorded only once when 3.0 inches (0.08 m) fell on one day in December 1932, and no maximum below 32 °F (0 °C) has ever been observed.

Summers in Parker can be dangerously hot, with highs in June, July, August, and September remaining in the 100 to 110 °F (37.8 to 43.3 °C) range, days over 115 °F (46.1 °C) or even 120 °F (48.9 °C) are not rare.

April and May both average 90 to 100 °F (32.2 to 37.8 °C) daytime highs. Even the month of October has an average high of 90.0 °F (32.2 °C). The all-time highest recorded temperature in Parker was 127 °F (52.8 °C), which occurred on July 7, 1905. This was, at the time, the all-time record high temperature in Arizona history until Lake Havasu City reached 128 °F (53.3 °C) on June 29, 1994.

Rainfall is uniformly scanty throughout the year in Parker, with no month averaging more than three days with measurable rainfall. The monsoon storms that provide much of the rain in southern and eastern parts of Arizona seldom effect Parker. The wettest month since records began in 1893 was September 1939, when a rare decaying hurricane produced a total of 8.85 inches (224.8 mm) including a record daily total of 3.41 inches (86.6 mm) on the fifth day of that month. The wettest calendar year has been 1992 with 13.59 inches (345.2 mm) – though from July 1992 to June 1993 the figure was slightly higher still at 13.74 inches (349.0 mm) – and the driest 1956 with 0.34 inches (8.6 mm).

Climate data for Parker, Arizona, 1991–2020 normals, extremes 1893–present
Month	Jan	Feb	Mar	Apr	May	Jun	Jul	Aug	Sep	Oct	Nov	Dec	Year
Record high °F (°C)	87 (31)	96 (36)	107 (42)	113 (45)	117 (47)	126 (52)	127 (53)	126 (52)	120 (49)	113 (45)	100 (38)	92 (33)	127 (53)
Mean maximum °F (°C)	77.6 (25.3)	82.8 (28.2)	91.3 (32.9)	100.8 (38.2)	107.0 (41.7)	114.3 (45.7)	116.5 (46.9)	115.7 (46.5)	111.6 (44.2)	102.2 (39.0)	90.1 (32.3)	76.4 (24.7)	118.2 (47.9)
Mean daily maximum °F (°C)	68.7 (20.4)	72.7 (22.6)	79.9 (26.6)	86.5 (30.3)	95.5 (35.3)	105.3 (40.7)	108.4 (42.4)	107.6 (42.0)	103.1 (39.5)	90.3 (32.4)	77.6 (25.3)	66.7 (19.3)	88.5 (31.4)
Daily mean °F (°C)	55.1 (12.8)	58.8 (14.9)	64.9 (18.3)	71.5 (21.9)	80.0 (26.7)	89.5 (31.9)	94.6 (34.8)	94.4 (34.7)	88.4 (31.3)	75.6 (24.2)	63.4 (17.4)	53.5 (11.9)	74.1 (23.4)
Mean daily minimum °F (°C)	41.5 (5.3)	45.0 (7.2)	49.9 (9.9)	56.4 (13.6)	64.4 (18.0)	73.7 (23.2)	80.7 (27.1)	81.2 (27.3)	73.8 (23.2)	60.9 (16.1)	49.2 (9.6)	40.4 (4.7)	59.8 (15.4)
Mean minimum °F (°C)	32.3 (0.2)	35.6 (2.0)	40.7 (4.8)	47.7 (8.7)	55.7 (13.2)	64.2 (17.9)	73.2 (22.9)	72.4 (22.4)	62.8 (17.1)	50.0 (10.0)	38.6 (3.7)	30.9 (−0.6)	29.7 (−1.3)
Record low °F (°C)	10 (−12)	11 (−12)	21 (−6)	23 (−5)	37 (3)	42 (6)	55 (13)	53 (12)	38 (3)	27 (−3)	18 (−8)	9 (−13)	9 (−13)
Average precipitation inches (mm)	0.85 (22)	0.73 (19)	0.55 (14)	0.16 (4.1)	0.07 (1.8)	0.03 (0.76)	0.18 (4.6)	0.43 (11)	0.41 (10)	0.42 (11)	0.23 (5.8)	0.51 (13)	4.57 (117.06)
Average precipitation days (≥ 0.01 in)	2.9	2.7	2.4	0.8	0.3	0.2	1.4	1.1	1.1	1.3	1.0	1.9	17.1
Source 1: NOAA
Source 2: National Weather Service

== Demographics ==
Historical population
Census	Pop.	Note	%±
1910	420		—
1930	1,315		—
1950	1,201		—
1960	1,642		36.7%
1970	1,948		18.6%
1980	2,542		30.5%
1990	2,897		14.0%
2000	3,140		8.4%
2010	3,083		−1.8%
2020	3,417		10.8%
U.S. Decennial Census

=== Racial and ethnic composition ===
Racial Makeup
Race (NH = Non-Hispanic)	% 2020	% 2010	% 2000	Pop. 2020	Pop. 2010	Pop. 2000
White Alone (NH)	32.2%	35.1%	45.4%	1,101	1,083	1,427
Black Alone (NH)	1.7%	1.3%	1.9%	58	41	59
American Indian Alone (NH)	18%	18%	19.7%	614	554	619
Asian Alone (NH)	1%	0.7%	0.8%	34	23	25
Pacific Islander Alone (NH)	0.1%	0%	0%	3	0	0
Other Race Alone (NH)	0%	0%	0%	1	1	2
Multiracial (NH)	5%	2.9%	2.3%	170	88	73
Hispanic (Any race)	42%	41.9%	29.8%	1,436	1,293	935

=== 2020 census ===
As of the 2020 census, Parker had a population of 3,417. The median age was 34.5 years. 27.7% of residents were under the age of 18 and 14.1% of residents were 65 years of age or older. For every 100 females, there were 100.9 males, and for every 100 females age 18 and over, there were 98.4 males age 18 and over.

Of residents, 99.2% lived in urban areas and 0.8% lived in rural areas.

There were 1,093 households, of which 40.9% had children under the age of 18 living in them. Of all households, 42.0% were married-couple households, 15.6% were households with a male householder and no spouse or partner present, and 31.6% were households with a female householder and no spouse or partner present. About 23.5% of all households were made up of individuals and 10.4% had someone living alone who was 65 years of age or older.

There were 1,195 housing units, of which 8.5% were vacant. The homeowner vacancy rate was 0.9% and the rental vacancy rate was 5.0%.

=== 2000 census ===
As of the census in 2000, there were 3,140 people, 1,064 households, and 791 families residing in the town. The population density was 142.8 inhabitants per square mile (55.1/km^{2}). There were 1,157 housing units at an average density of 52.6 per square mile (20.3/km^{2}). The racial makeup of the town was 62.0% White, 1.9% Black or African American, 23.1% Native American, 0.9% Asian, 0.2% Pacific Islander, 7.5% from other races, and 4.5% from two or more races. 29.8% of the population were Hispanic or Latino of any race.

There were 1,064 households, out of which 41.5% had children under the age of 18 living with them, 51.6% were married couples living together, 15.6% had a female householder with no husband present, and 25.6% were non-families. 20.6% of all households were made up of individuals, and 8.4% had someone living alone who was 65 years of age or older. The average household size was 2.93 and the average family size was 3.38.

In the town, the population was spread out, with 32.8% under the age of 18, 9.6% from 18 to 24, 25.4% from 25 to 44, 22.8% from 45 to 64, and 9.4% who were 65 years of age or older. The median age was 32 years. For every 100 females, there were 93.9 males. For every 100 females age 18 and over, there were 88.4 males.

The median income for a household in the town was $34,625, and the median income for a family was $37,663. Males had a median income of $26,542 versus $21,006 for females. The per capita income for the town was $15,016. About 10.6% of families and 14.7% of the population were below the poverty line, including 18.2% of those under age 18 and 13.9% of those age 65 or over.

== Transportation ==
Arizona State Route 95 runs through Parker, entering the town from the northeast as Rio Vista Highway then turning south in the intersection with California Avenue. To the north of the intersection with California Avenue is the State Route 95 truck spur, which leads to the Colorado River bridge and the eastern terminus of California State Route 62 in Earp.

Avi Suquilla Airport (FAA LID: P20) is a public use airport located one nautical mile (1.8 km) east of the central business district of Parker. It is owned by the Colorado River Indian Tribes.

The Arizona & California Railroad is headquartered in Parker, after replacing the Santa Fe Railway in 1991 as the owner and operator of the railroad line through the town. It crosses over the Colorado River on a five-span truss bridge near the road bridge to Earp.

La Paz County Health Department operates La Paz County Transit, an on-demand bus service.

== See also ==
- Big River, California
- Bluewater, Arizona
- Blythe, California
- Bouse, Arizona
- Cienega Springs, Arizona
- Earp, California
- List of historic properties in Parker, Arizona
- Quartzsite, Arizona
- Parker Dam
- Parker Strip, Arizona
- Parker Valley
- Vidal, California

== Gallery ==
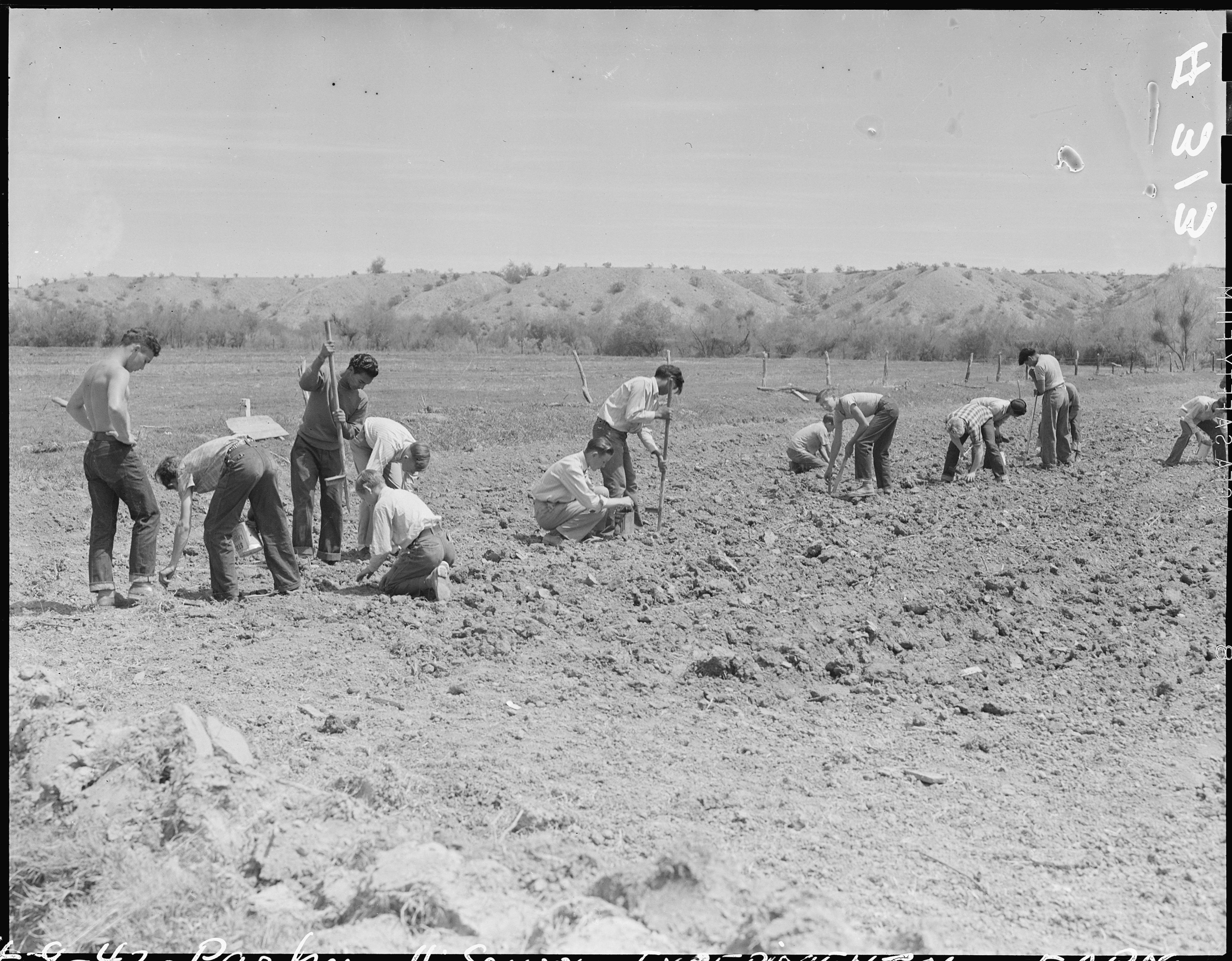
Parker High School students planting guayule at the Poston War Relocation Center on April 9, 1942.

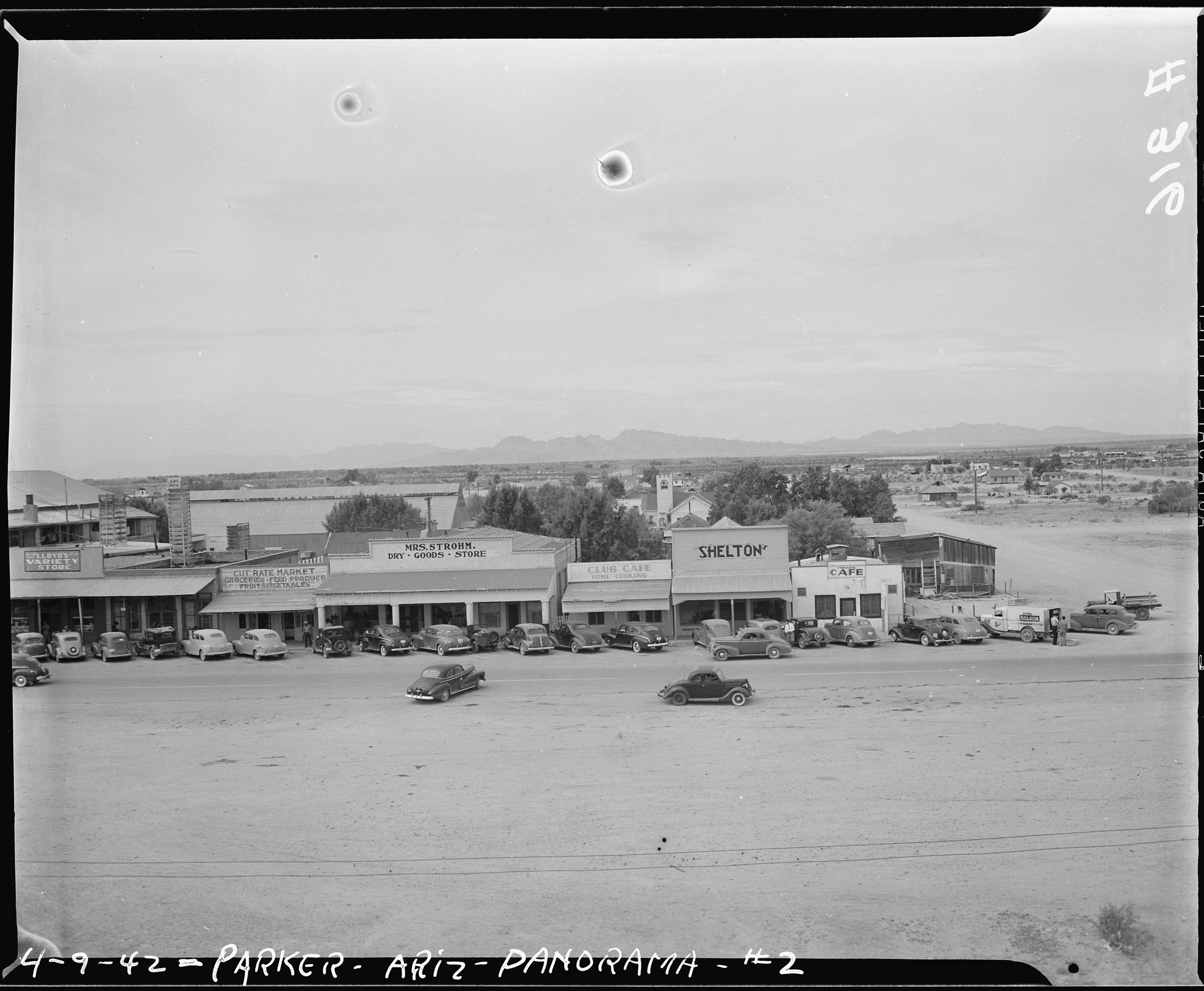
Parker's main street on April 9, 1942.

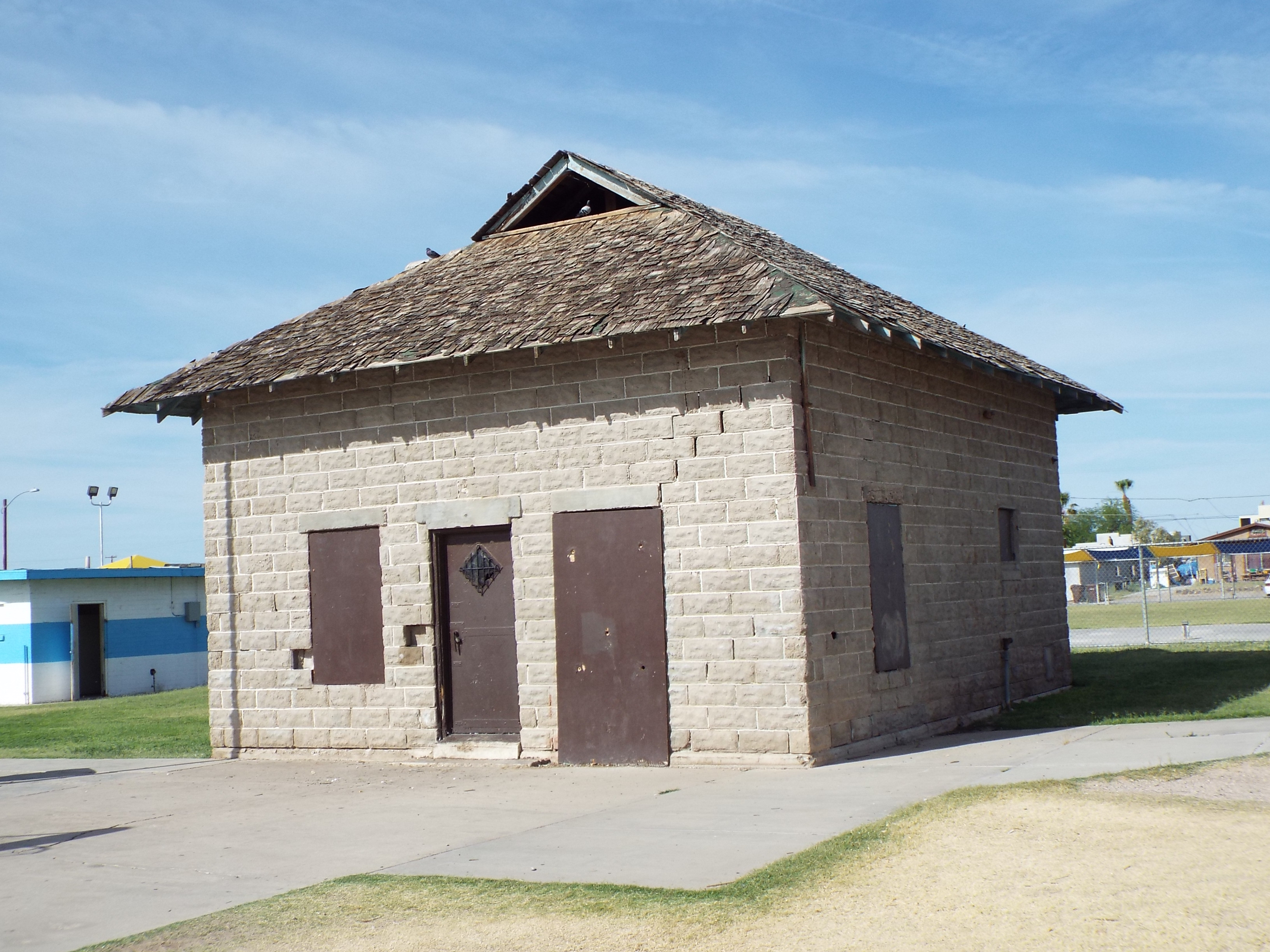
The Old Parker Jail was built in 1914 and located in Pop Harvey City Park. It was listed on the National Register of Historic Places on April 3, 1975, Reference #75000369.

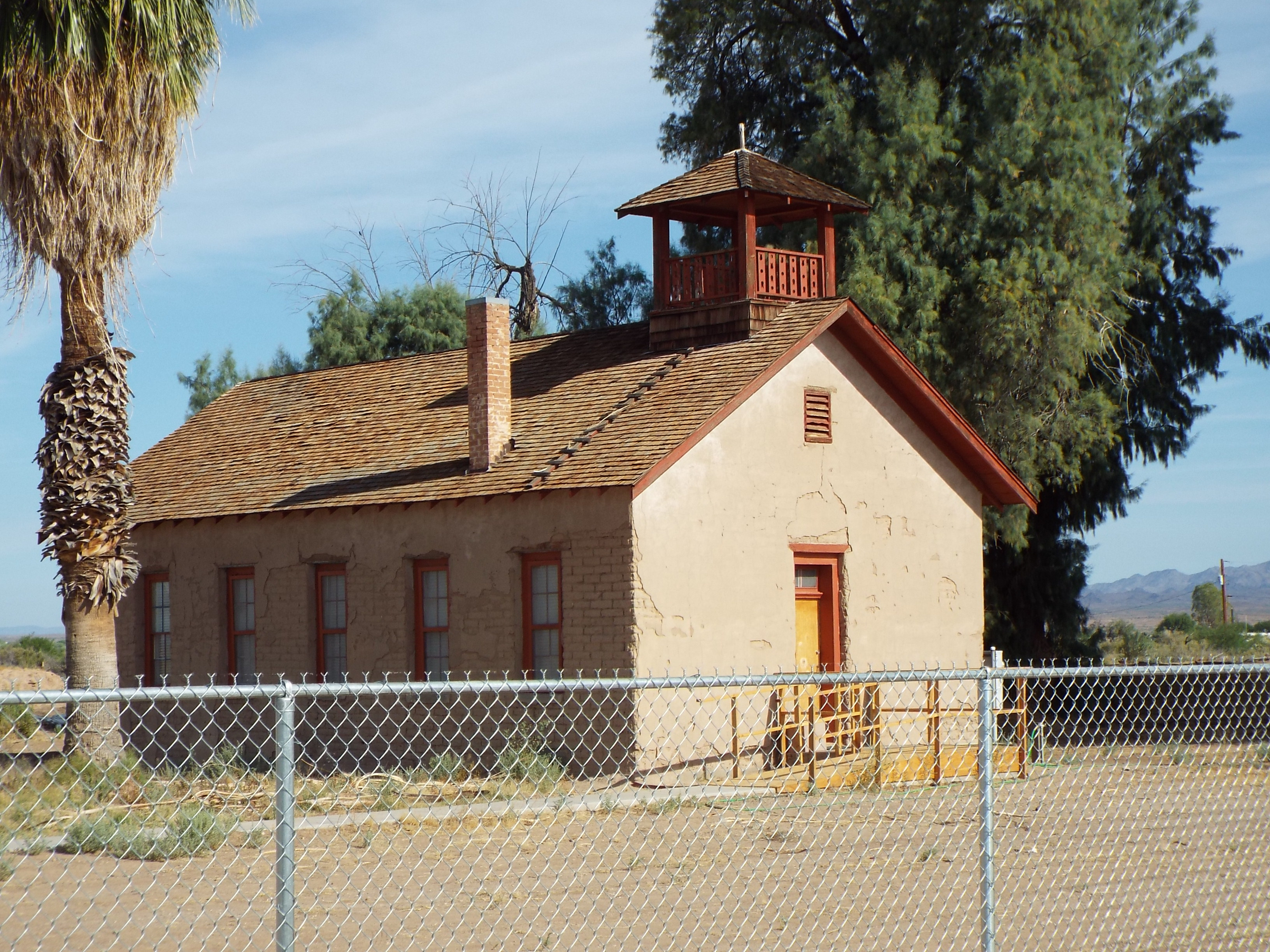
The Old Presbyterian Church a.k.a. Mojave Indian Presbyterian Mission Church, located on the South West corner of 2nd Ave., was built in 1917. It was listed in the National Register of Historic Places on June 3, 1971, Reference #71000122.
