= Colorado River Indian Tribes =

Federally recognized Native American tribe in Arizona and California

Coordinates: 33°55′54″N 114°23′19″W

'Aha Havasuu (Mohave) Tó Ntsʼósíkooh Bibąąhgi Bitsįʼ Yishtłizhii Bináhásdzo (Navajo)
- Tribal flag

Total population
- 4,277

Regions with significant populations
- United States (Arizona, California)

Languages
- Colorado River Numic language, Mojave, Navajo, Hopi, English

Related ethnic groups
- other Mohave, Chemehuevi, Hopi, and Navajo people

The Colorado River Indian Tribes (Mohave: Aha Havasuu, Navajo: Tó Ntsʼósíkooh Bibąąhgi Bitsįʼ Yishtłizhii Bináhásdzo) is a federally recognized tribe consisting of the four distinct ethnic groups associated with the Colorado River Indian Reservation: the Mohave, Chemehuevi, Hopi, and Navajo. The tribe has about 4,277 enrolled citizens. A total population of 9,485 currently resides within the tribal reservation according to the 2012-2016 American Community Survey data.

== Reservation ==
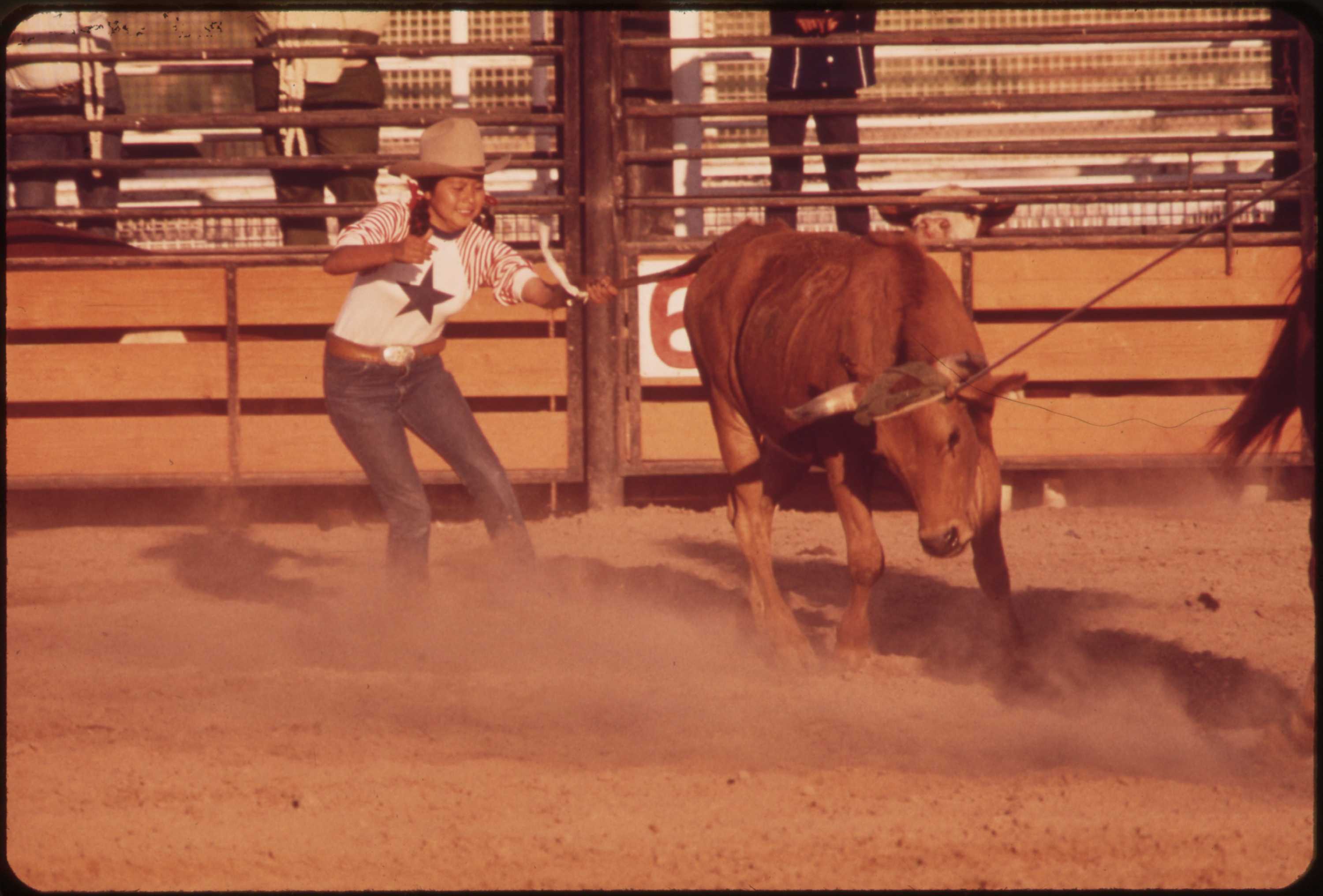
Junior Rodeo on the Colorado River Indian Reservation, 1972

The Colorado River Indian Reservation is a Native American reservation in the southwest United States. Its territory is primarily in western La Paz County, Arizona, with smaller portions in southeastern San Bernardino, and northeastern Riverside counties, California. It has a total land area of 1,119.4445 km^{2} (432.22 sq mi), most of it within Parker Valley. It borders the Palo Verde Valley in the southwest boundaries. Tribal headquarters are in Parker, Arizona. Tribal citizens mainly live in communities in and around Parker, the largest community, and Poston. The 2000 census reported a population of 9,201 persons residing on the reservation.

== Government ==
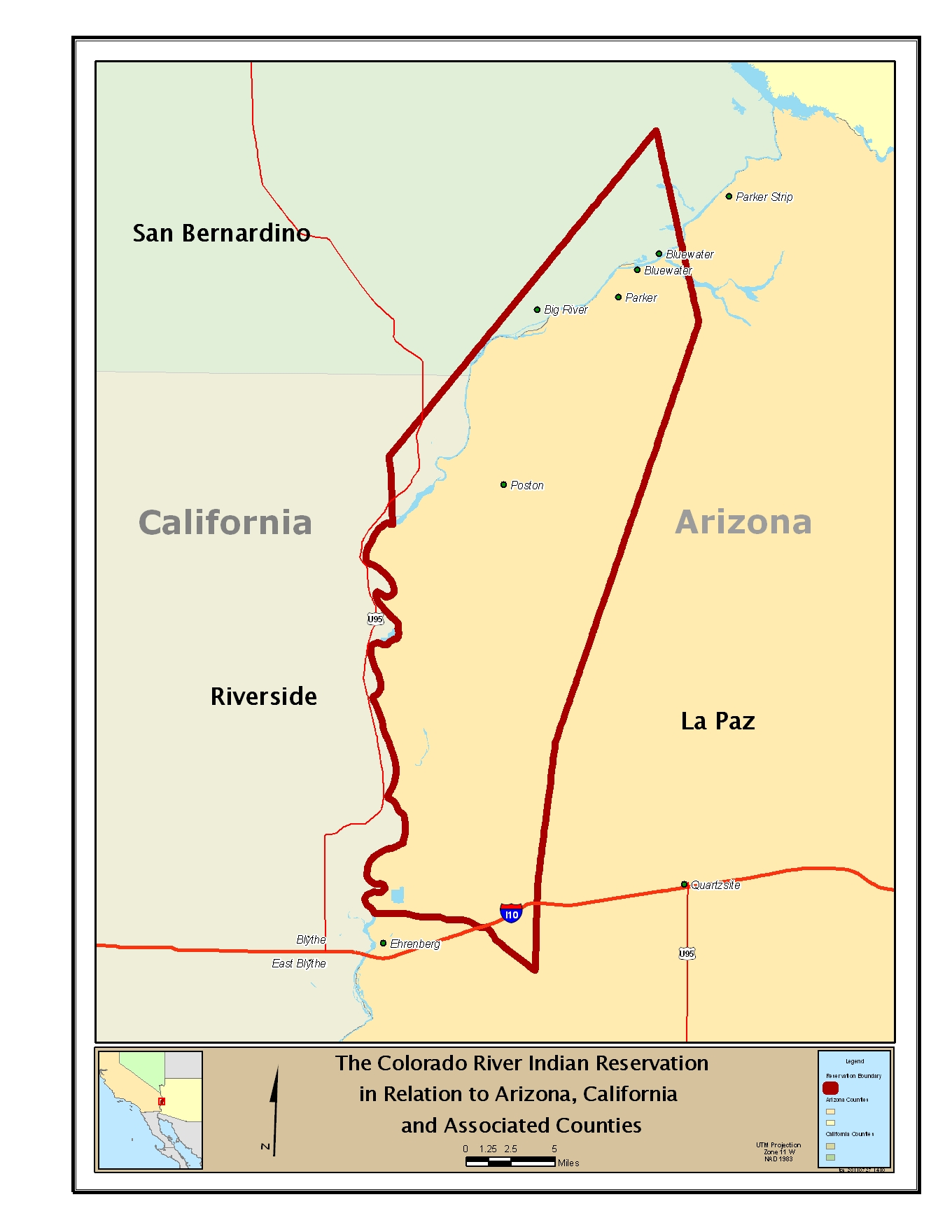
The Colorado River Indian Reservation

The tribe and its reservation are governed by a democratically elected council of nine members and overseen by a tribal chairman, secretary, and treasurer. The council members elect the executive officers. The four tribes continue to maintain and observe their traditional ways, religions, and culturally unique identities.

The current administration is:

- Chairwoman: Amelia Flores
- Vice Chairman: Dwight Lomayesva
- Tribal Secretary: Josephine Tahbo
- Tribal Treasurer: Anisa Patch
- Council Member: William “Billy” Beeson
- Council Member: Thomas "Tommy" Drennan
- Council Member: Raeanne Patch
- Council Member: Tracey Quillen
- Council Member: Vanessa Welch

== History ==
The reservation was established on March 3, 1865, for "Indians of said river and its tributaries." Initially, these were the Mohave and Chemehuevi, but Hopi and Navajo people were relocated to the reservation in 1945. In 1942, land within the reservation was chosen - against the wishes of the tribal council - as the site of Poston War Relocation Center during World War II. Office of Indian Affairs officials saw the Japanese-American Internment camp as a way to bring infrastructure to the reservation without having to fund it themselves. The camp closed in 1945 and the land and remaining camp buildings was returned to the tribes. John Scott designed the tribal seal in 1966, with four feathers to represent the four CRIT tribes (Colorado River Indian Tribes). Margie McCabe designed the tribal flag, which the tribe formally adopted in 1979.

== Economic development ==
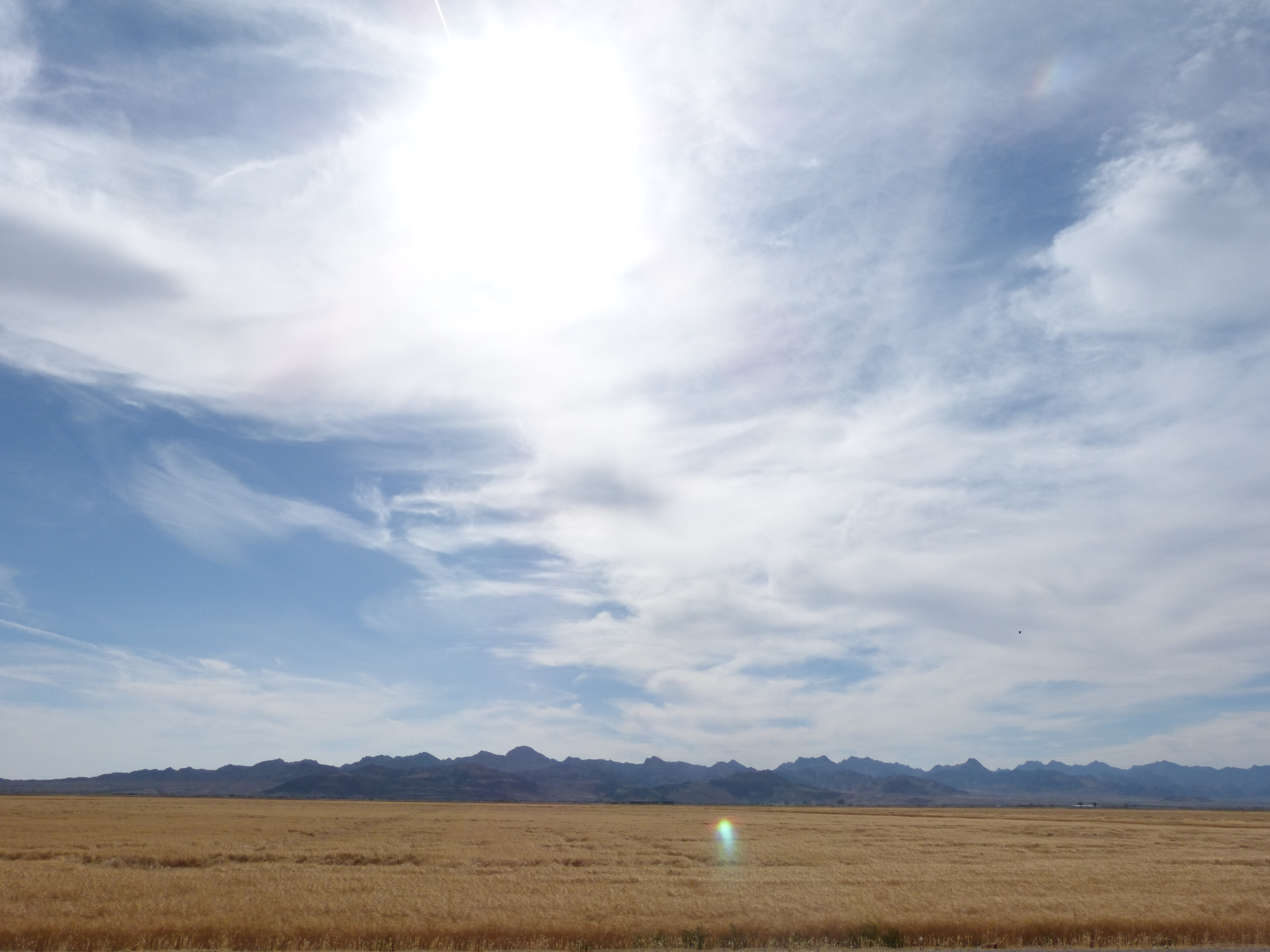
Wheat fields along the Colorado River at the Colorado River Indian Reservation. Wheat, alfalfa and melons are among the most important crops here.

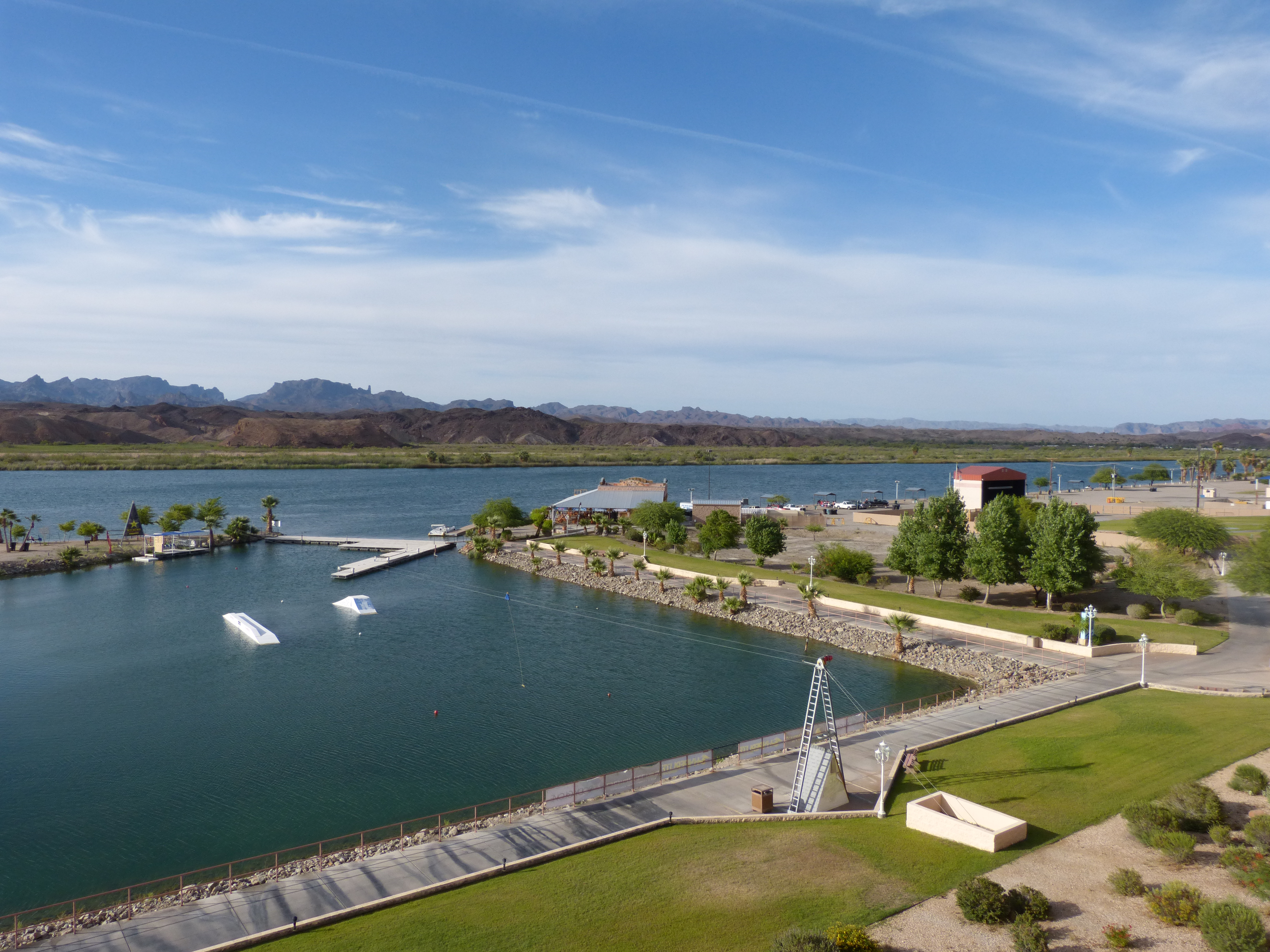
View of the Colorado River and the marina and riverside facilities of the Bluewater Resort and Casino

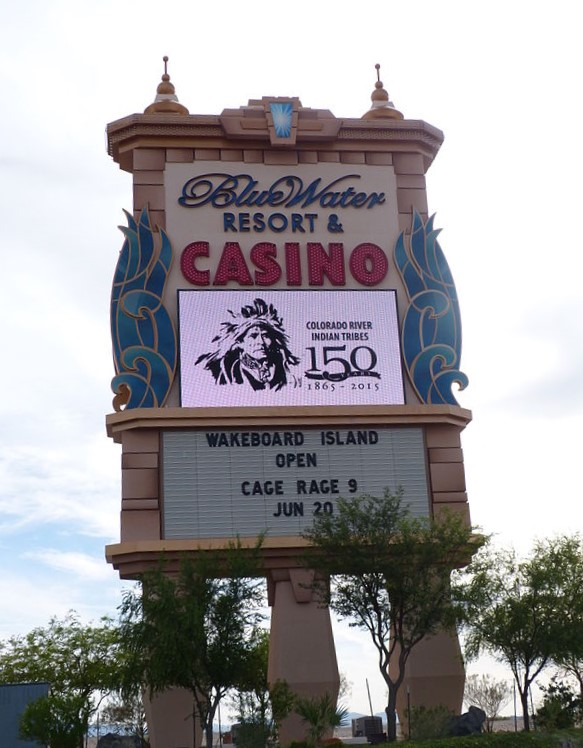
Entrance to the Bluewater Resort and Casino, in Parker

The economy for the tribe is based on light industry, government, recreation, and agricultural, specifically growing commodity crops of alfalfa, cotton, lettuce, and sorghum. The Colorado River Indian Tribes (CRIT) has senior water rights to divert up to 719,248 acre feet of water from the Colorado River, which represents nearly one-third of the allocation for the state of Arizona.

The tribe operates BlueWater Resort and Casino, located about two miles (3 km) from downtown Parker, as a tourist destination on the Colorado River. It opened in June 1999. The casino is 30,000 square feet (2,800 m^{2}) and has more than 500 slot machines. The resort features a 200-room hotel, a 10,000 square feet (930 m^{2}) bingo hall, an indoor water park, movie theater, video arcade, marina, and concert facilities.

The Colorado River Indian Tribe Museum and Gift Shop is in Parker, Arizona, and has displays of historical and contemporary artworks, especially ceramics, made by tribal citizens.

== Communities ==
- Bluewater, Arizona
- Bluewater, California
- Parker, Arizona (seat of government)
- Poston, Arizona

== Notable tribal citizens ==
- Jacoby Ellsbury (b. 1983), baseball center fielder with the Boston Red Sox and New York Yankees of Major League Baseball
- Veronica Murdock (b. 1944), tribal vice chair and first woman president of the National Congress of American Indians
- Adam Sevada (b. 1985), darts player

== See also ==
- Indigenous rights to land along rivers
