= Bluewater, Arizona =

CDP in La Paz County, Arizona

- Census-designated place
- Location in La Paz County and the state of Arizona

- Location in the United States
- Coordinates: 34°10′28″N 114°15′09″W
- Country: United States
- State: Arizona
- County: La Paz

Area
  - Total: 2.39 sq mi (6.18 km^{2})
  - Land: 2.08 sq mi (5.38 km^{2})
  - Water: 0.31 sq mi (0.80 km^{2})
- Elevation: 390 ft (120 m)

Population (2020)
  - Total: 682
  - Density: 328.3/sq mi (126.77/km^{2})
- Time zone: UTC-7 (MST (no daylight saving time))
- ZIP code: 85344
- Area code: 928
- FIPS code: 04-07025
- GNIS feature ID: 2407868

Bluewater is a census-designated place (CDP) on the Colorado River Indian Reservation in La Paz County, Arizona, United States. The population was 725 at the 2010 census.

== Geography ==
Bluewater is located in northern La Paz County on the southeast bank of the Colorado River and is bordered to the north, across the river, by the community of Bluewater, California.

According to the United States Census Bureau, the CDP has a total area of 2.4 square miles (6.2 km^{2}), of which 2.1 square miles (5.4 km^{2}) are land and 0.3 square miles (0.8 km^{2}), or 12.91%, are water.

== Demographics ==
Historical population
Census	Pop.	Note	%±
1990	505		—
2000	730		44.6%
2010	725		−0.7%
2020	682		−5.9%

Bluewater first appeared on the 1990 U.S. Census as a census-designated place (CDP).

As of the census of 2000, there were 730 people, 337 households, and 221 families residing in the CDP. The population density was 355.2 inhabitants per square mile (137.1/km^{2}). There were 537 housing units at an average density of 261.3 per square mile (100.9/km^{2}). The racial makeup of the CDP was 81.1% White, 8.2% Native American, 0.3% Asian, 0.1% Pacific Islander, 5.5% from other races, and 4.8% from two or more races. Hispanic or Latino of any race were 15.2% of the population.

There were 337 households, out of which 21.7% had children under the age of 18 living with them, 51.9% were married couples living together, 10.1% had a female householder with no husband present, and 34.4% were non-families. 29.7% of all households were made up of individuals, and 17.2% had someone living alone who was 65 years of age or older. The average household size was 2.17 and the average family size was 2.62.

In the CDP, the population was spread out, with 19.3% under the age of 18, 4.7% from 18 to 24, 20.5% from 25 to 44, 22.3% from 45 to 64, and 33.2% who were 65 years of age or older. The median age was 50 years. For every 100 females, there were 96.2 males. For every 100 females age 18 and over, there were 97.0 males.

The median income for a household in the CDP was $30,600, and the median income for a family was $31,339. Males had a median income of $25,833 versus $21,250 for females. The per capita income for the CDP was $16,525. About 7.0% of families and 10.8% of the population were below the poverty line, including 21.6% of those under age 18 and 7.7% of those age 65 or over.
