= Arizona and California Railroad =

Short line railroad in the Southwestern United States

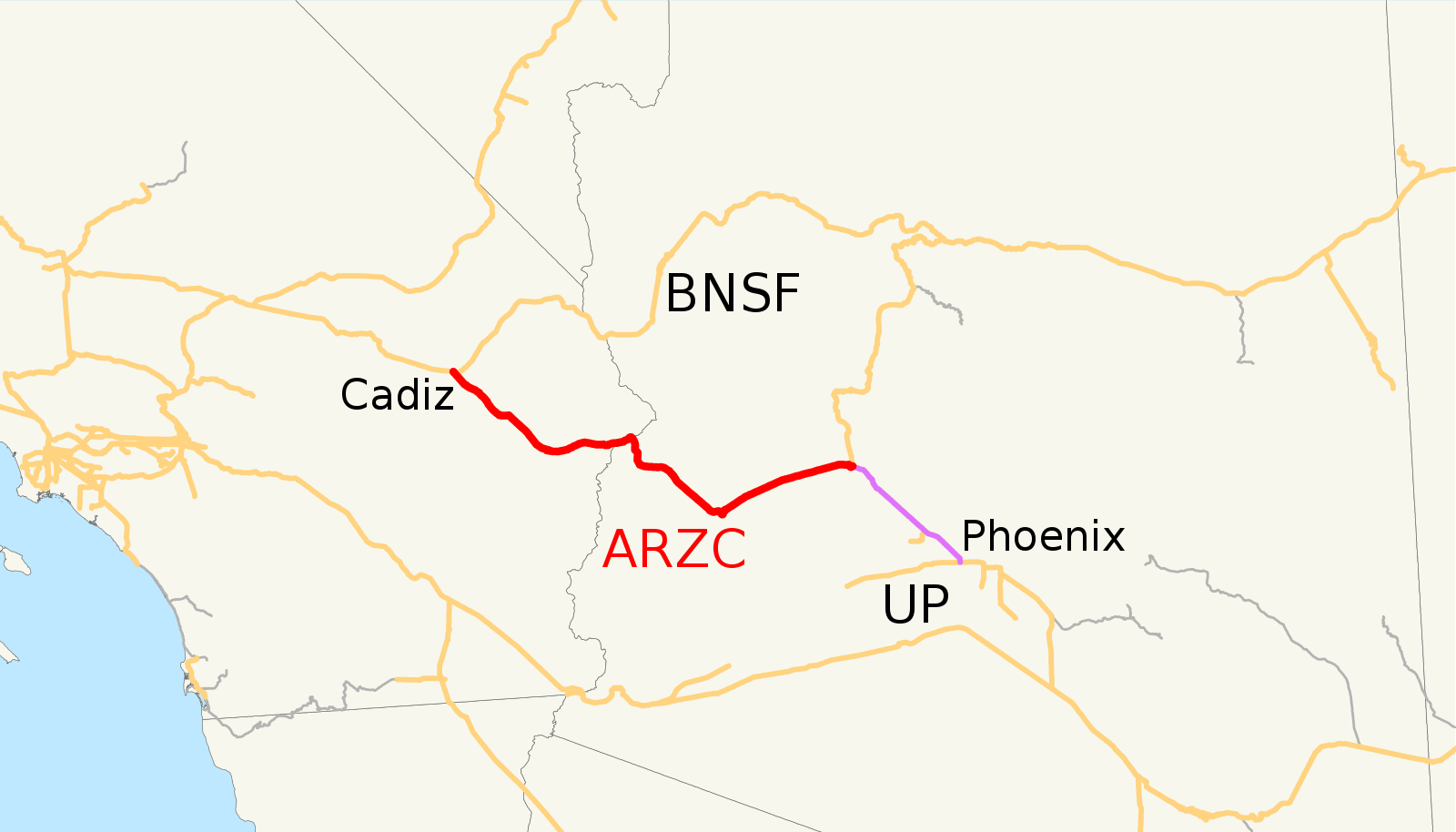

Overview
- Headquarters: Parker, Arizona
- Reporting mark: ARZC
- Locale: Mojave Desert - Sonoran Desert
- Dates of operation: May 9, 1991–

Technical
- Track gauge: 4 ft 8 1/2 in (1,435 mm) standard gauge
- Length: 205 miles (330 km)

Other
- Website: gwrr.com/arzc

🔴 ARZC 🔵 Trackage Rights over the BNSF Phoenix Subdivision

The Arizona and California Railroad (reporting mark ARZC) is a class III short line railroad that was a subdivision of the Atchison, Topeka and Santa Fe Railway (reporting mark ATSF). The ARZC began operations on May 9, 1991, when David Parkinson of the ParkSierra RailGroup purchased the line from the Santa Fe Railway. ParkSierra Railgroup was purchased in January 2002 by shortline railroad holding company RailAmerica. The Genesee & Wyoming shortline railroad holding company purchased RailAmerica in December 2012. ARZC's main commodities are petroleum gas, steel, and lumber; the railroad hauls around 12,000 carloads per year.

== Route ==
At Cadiz, California, the railroad begins in the interchange with the BNSF Railway and continues southeast across the Mojave Desert to Rice, then east to cross the Colorado River Arizona/California state line at Parker, Arizona. The railroad continues southeast to Hope near Vicksburg then northeast to Matthie (near Wickenburg, Arizona). At Matthie, ARZC has trackage rights over the north-south BNSF line that connects Phoenix to BNSF's mainline at Williams. It also had a branch that runs from Rice south through Blythe, terminating at Ripley.

Arizona & California operates over 262 miles (422 km) of track, consisting of the following segments:

- 191-mile (307 km) mainline between Cadiz, CA (BNSF interchange) and Matthie, AZ (BNSF interchange).
- 4-mile (6.4 km) spur at Rice, CA for railcar storage, formerly part of the abandoned 50-mile (80 km) Rice-Ripley branch.
- 2.5-mile (4.0 km) loop at Utting, AZ for Rose Acre Farms' Lone Cactus Egg Farm.
- 57 miles (92 km) of trackage rights over the BNSF Railway between Matthie, AZ and Phoenix, AZ (UP interchange).

== History ==
=== Arizona and California Railway ===
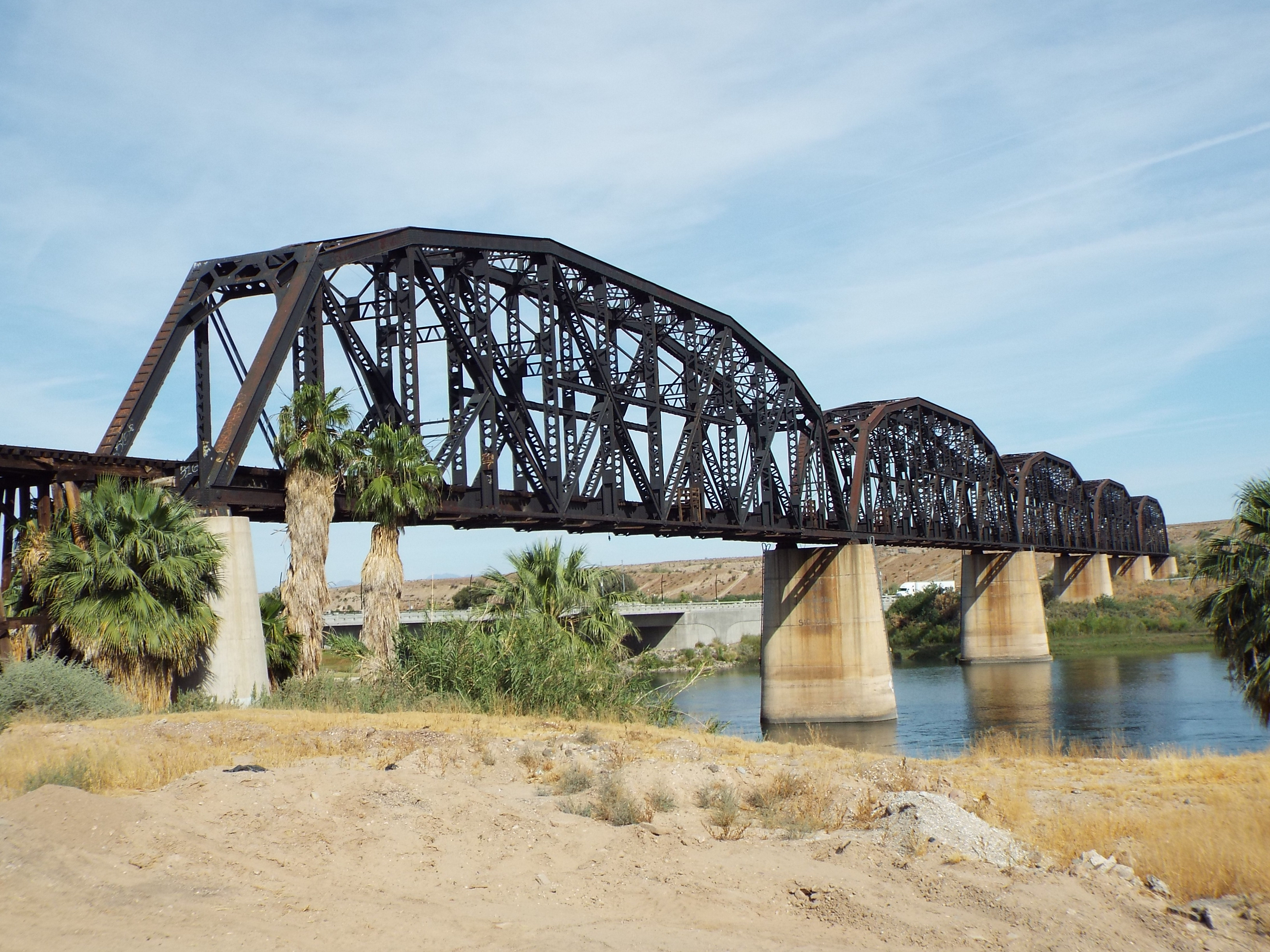
The Arizona and California Railroad Bridge over the Colorado River built in 1908.

The mainline now used by ARZC was originally constructed between 1903 and 1910 by the Arizona and California Railway. The line between A&C Junction, AZ, and Parker opened by June 1907. The Colorado River bridge near Parker was completed in June 1908 and the track connection in Cadiz, California was made on June 10, 1910; service to Cadiz commenced on July 1. In 1909, the Arizona and Swansea Railroad that connected Swansea from Bouse was completed.

Original Steam Locomotive Roster 1903-1911
#	ATSF#	Builder	Built	SN	Type	Retired	Disposition
14	2433	Alco Brooks	1903	27602	4-6-0	12/1923	Scrapped
15	2434	Alco Brooks	1903	27603	4-6-0	12/1925	Scrapped
16	2435	Alco Brooks	1903	27604	4-6-0	11/1926	Scrapped

On November 22, 1921, a rail motor car carrying Santa Fe officials derailed north of Wickenburg, with five killed and four injured. A&C Junction was renamed Matthie in honor of the Albuquerque Division superintendent William Matthie.

As late as 1937, there were several daily passenger trains on the line: #170-117 and #118-181 operated daily between Phoenix Union Station and Cadiz, with connections to Los Angeles and San Francisco; mixed trains #210-233 and #234-209 operated daily between Phoenix's Mobest Yard and Parker; and mixed trains #25 and #26 operated daily except on Sunday or Monday connecting at Rice for Blythe. Trains #170-117 and #118-181 as of June 1954 were hauled by Santa Fe's only ALCO RS-2, and shortly after were supplanted by a motor car; the trains were discontinued effective October 1, 1955.

=== Rice to Ripley branch ===
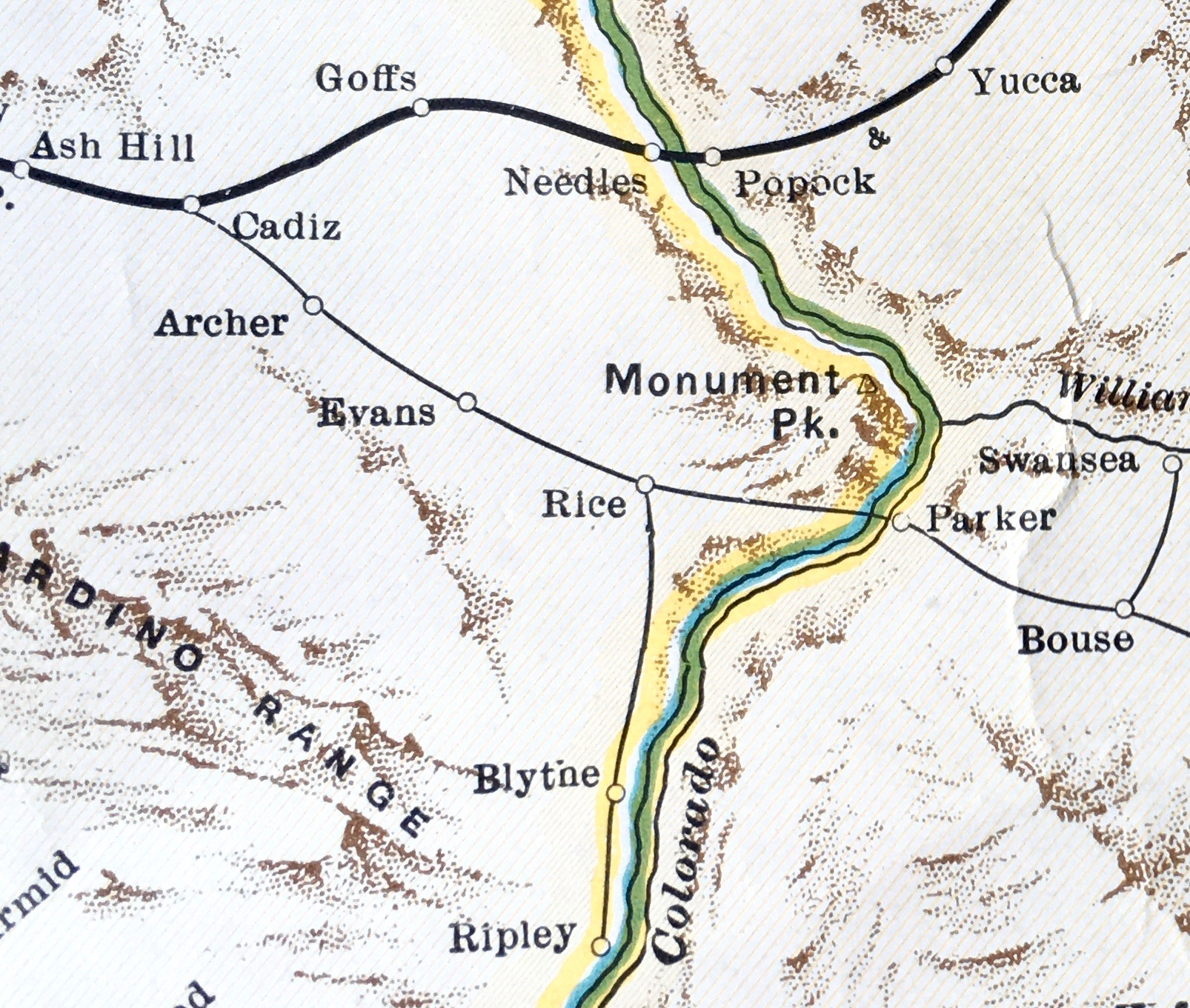
Route in 1930

In 1914, the California Southern Railroad (not to be confused with the earlier railroad linking Barstow and San Diego) was incorporated to build 42.2 mi (67.9 km) from a town then known as Blythe Junction (now Rice, California) to Blythe. The first spike was pounded on August 23, 1915 by Floyd Brown. The Interstate Commerce Commission reported the line as the longest built in the country in 1915. The first train to Blythe arrived on August 8, 1916 and the branch was extended to Ripley in 1920. Santa Fe leased the line in November 1921 and completed its acquisition in 1942. Blythe passenger service ended shortly after World War II, according to Santa Fe agent Ruben Gonzales.

On March 12, 2009, citing declining revenues and worn out track structure, the ARZC petitioned the Surface Transportation Board to abandon all but the first four miles of the Ripley branch line. In its petition, the ARZC said no trains had run over the line since late 2007 and the cost to repair the branch line would be significant. On June 30, 2009, the Surface Transportation Board granted the ARZC petition.

A Blythe area committee formed to oppose the petition had found a customer willing to purchase the line, the owner of the BG&CM Railroad of Idaho. By January 14, 2010, the Surface Transportation Board terminated the offer of financial assistance for the railroad. The rail line was scrapped in 2011 beyond the first four miles from Rice.

== Rolling stock ==
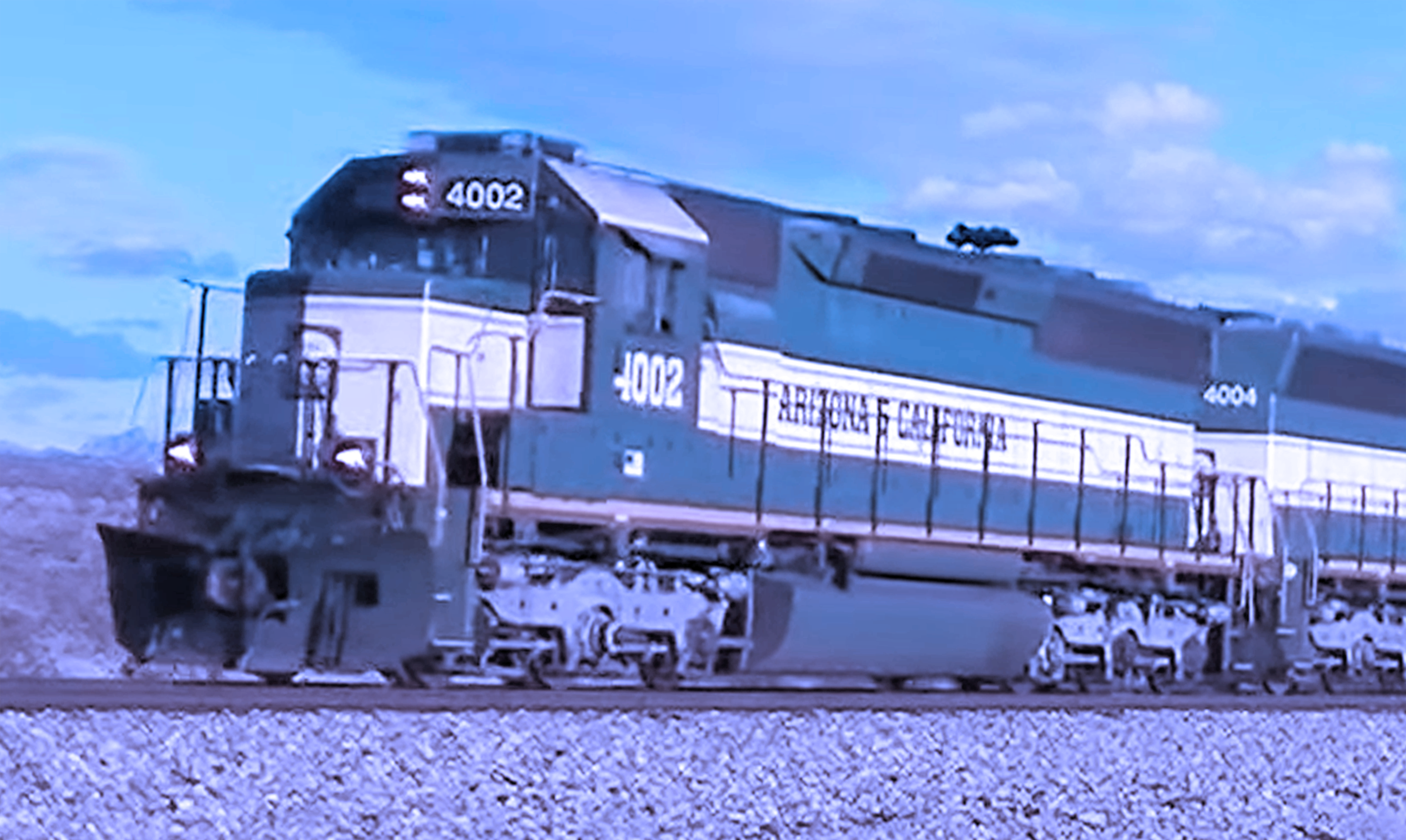
ARZC #4002 operating the Arizona and California Railroad, on January 13, 2017.

The diesel roster during ARZC's early years included five EMD GP20s, one GP38AC, three GP38Ms (former GP40s), and two MP15DCs. The railroad acquired GP30s and GP35s to replace the GP20s. In May 2001, the railroad received four SD45Ms (two rebuilt SD45s and two rebuilt SD45-2s with SD40-2 specifications and bigger cooling systems) from VMV Paducahbilt. In 2022, the railroad received four GE C44-9W's and one GE Dash 8-40B to replace its aging fleet of EMD SD40-2's and EMD SD40M-2's.

The railroad also owned or leased freight cars including twenty five Gunderson double stack cars, and possesses a former Santa Fe crane. The railroad also owned the former Great Northern Apekunny Mountain observation car, followed by former Santa Fe official car No. 58 which is on display in the Western America Railroad Museum in Barstow, California.

Locomotive model	Road no.
GE C44-9W (Note: These units are former GECX/BNSF 4534, 4577, 4846, and 4527. They were acquired in 2022.)	4400
GE C44-9W	4401
GE C44-9W	4402
GE C44-9W	4403
GE Dash 8-40B	4014 (Note: Former GECX/CSX 5950.)
EMD SD40M-2	3996 (Note: Sold to RCPE, then KYLE along with 3997.)
EMD SD40M-2	3997 (Note: Sold to RCPE, then KYLE along with 3996.)
EMD SD40M-2	4001 (Note: Sold to RCPE along with 4002)
EMD SD40M-2	4002 (Note: Sold to RCPE along with 4001.)
EMD SD40M-2	4003 (Note: Renumbered to 3996)
EMD SD40M-2	4004 (Note: Renumbered to 3997)
EMD SD40-2	3998 (Note: Sold to CORP as of 2023)
EMD SD40-2	3999 (Note: Sold to RCPE)
EMD GP20 (Note: All units sold to NREX then to other railroads.)	2001
EMD GP20	2002
EMD GP20	2003
EMD GP20	2004
EMD GP20	2005
EMD GP30M	3001
EMD GP30M	3002
EMD GP30M	3003
EMD GP30M	3004
EMD GP30M	3005
EMD GP38-2	3112
EMD GP35	3501
EMD GP35	3502
EMD GP35	3503
EMD GP40R	3802
EMD GP40R	3803
EMD GP40R	3892
EMD GP40R	3893
EMD GP38AC	3894
EMD GP39-2	3901
