= Vicksburg, Arizona =

Census-designated place in La Paz County, Arizona, United States

- Census-designated place
- Location in La Paz County, Arizona

- Location in Arizona Location in the United States
- Coordinates: 33°44′40″N 113°49′32″W
- Country: United States
- State: Arizona
- County: La Paz

Area
  - Total: 142.94 sq mi (370.20 km^{2})
  - Land: 142.94 sq mi (370.20 km^{2})
  - Water: 0 sq mi (0.00 km^{2})
- Elevation: 1,132 ft (345 m)

Population (2020)
  - Total: 418
  - Density: 2.9/sq mi (1.13/km^{2})
- Time zone: UTC-7 (Mountain (MST))
- Area code: 928
- GNIS feature ID: 2582892
- FIPS code: 04-79940

Vicksburg is a census-designated place in La Paz County, Arizona, United States. Its population was 418 as of the 2020 census. The community was named for Victor E. Satterdahl, a storekeeper who applied for its post office and served as the first postmaster once it opened in 1906.

== Infrastructure ==
The Desert Sky Domestic Water Improvement District serves part of Vicksburg.

== Demographics ==
Historical population
Census	Pop.	Note	%±
2020	418		—
U.S. Decennial Census

== See also ==
- List of census-designated places in Arizona
