= List of historic properties in Bouse, Arizona =

- Town
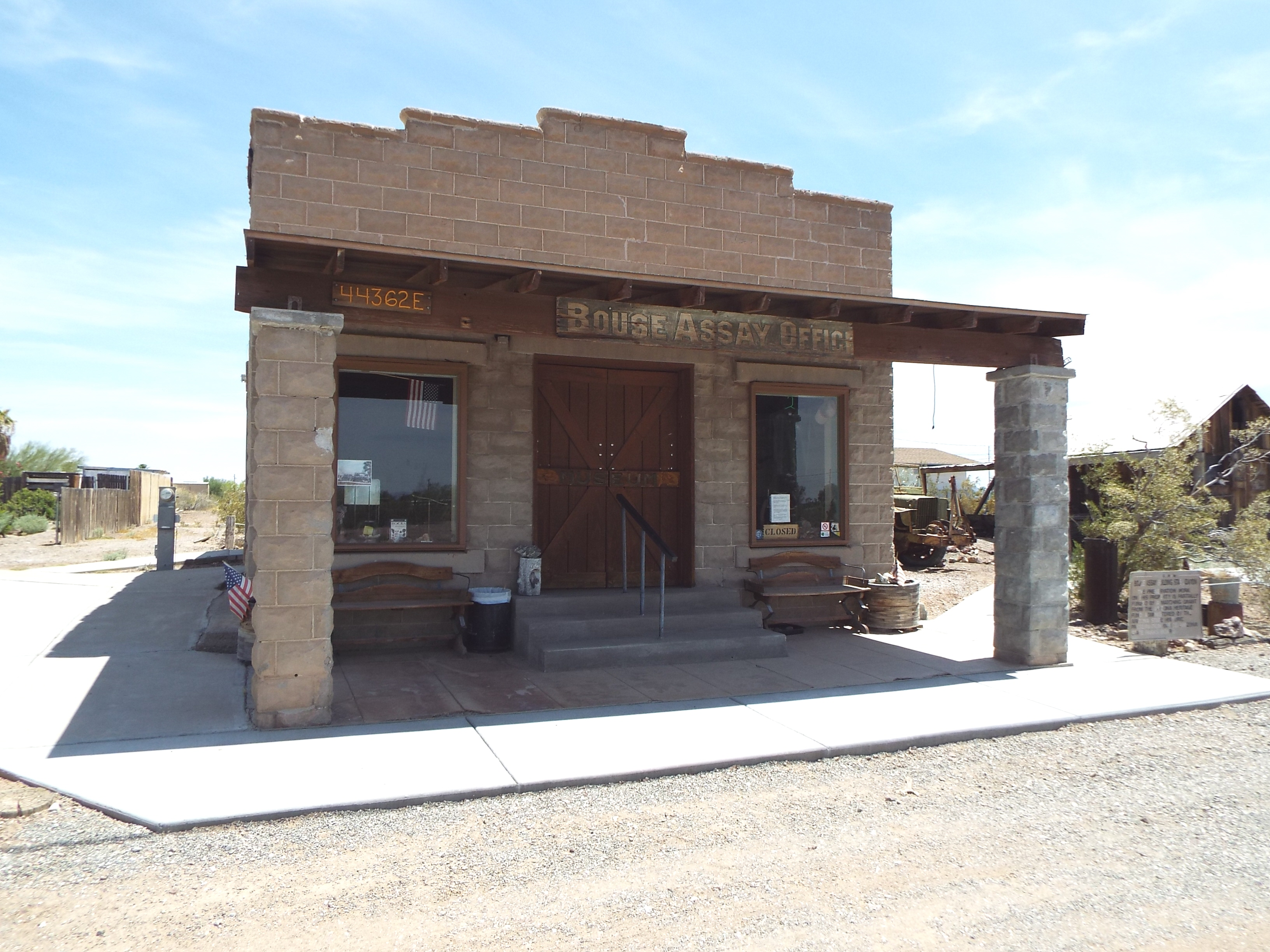
- 1902 Assay building

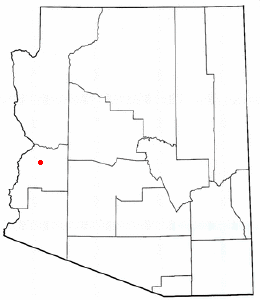
- Location in La Paz County and the state of Arizona

This is a list, which includes a photographic gallery, of some of the remaining structures and monuments, of historic significance in Bouse, an unincorporated community which is located on Highway 72 in La Paz County, Arizona. mining was the main industry in Bouse in the late 1890s. In 1943, General George Patton established a secret tank training camp, called Camp Bouse in the area.

== Brief history ==
The area where Bouse is located was first inhabited by the ancient Native-American tribe known as the Hohokam. Hohokam is a Pima (O'odham) word used by archaeologists to identify a group of people who lived in the Sonoran Desert of North America.

Following the expansion of the New Mexico Territory in 1853, as a result of the Gadsden Purchase, several proposals for a division of the territory and the organization of a separate Territory of Arizona in the southern half of the territory were advanced as early as 1856.

In 1889, Thomas Bouse, a native of Missouri, arrived in the region in search of gold. He laid claim to various mines, one of which was called the "Old Dutchman Mine" and he also homesteaded various acres of land. In 1904, the Arizona & California Railroad laid tracks from Wickenburg to California. Bouse decided to make a profit from his investments and sold the right of way to the railroad company. Eventually he sold his well and some of his mining claims.

In 1906, John Brayton established the Brayton Mercantile Company on the Eastern side of the train depot and railroad tracks. Bryton was the owner of the Brayton Commercial Company which were established in the towns of Wickenburg and Salome. The early settlers called the area Brayton, however when they proposed naming their small town Brayton, the application sent to the government was returned with the small town being named Bouse instead of the proposed name.

Bouse did not prosper much until 1943, when the United States was involved in World War II.

== Camp Bouse ==
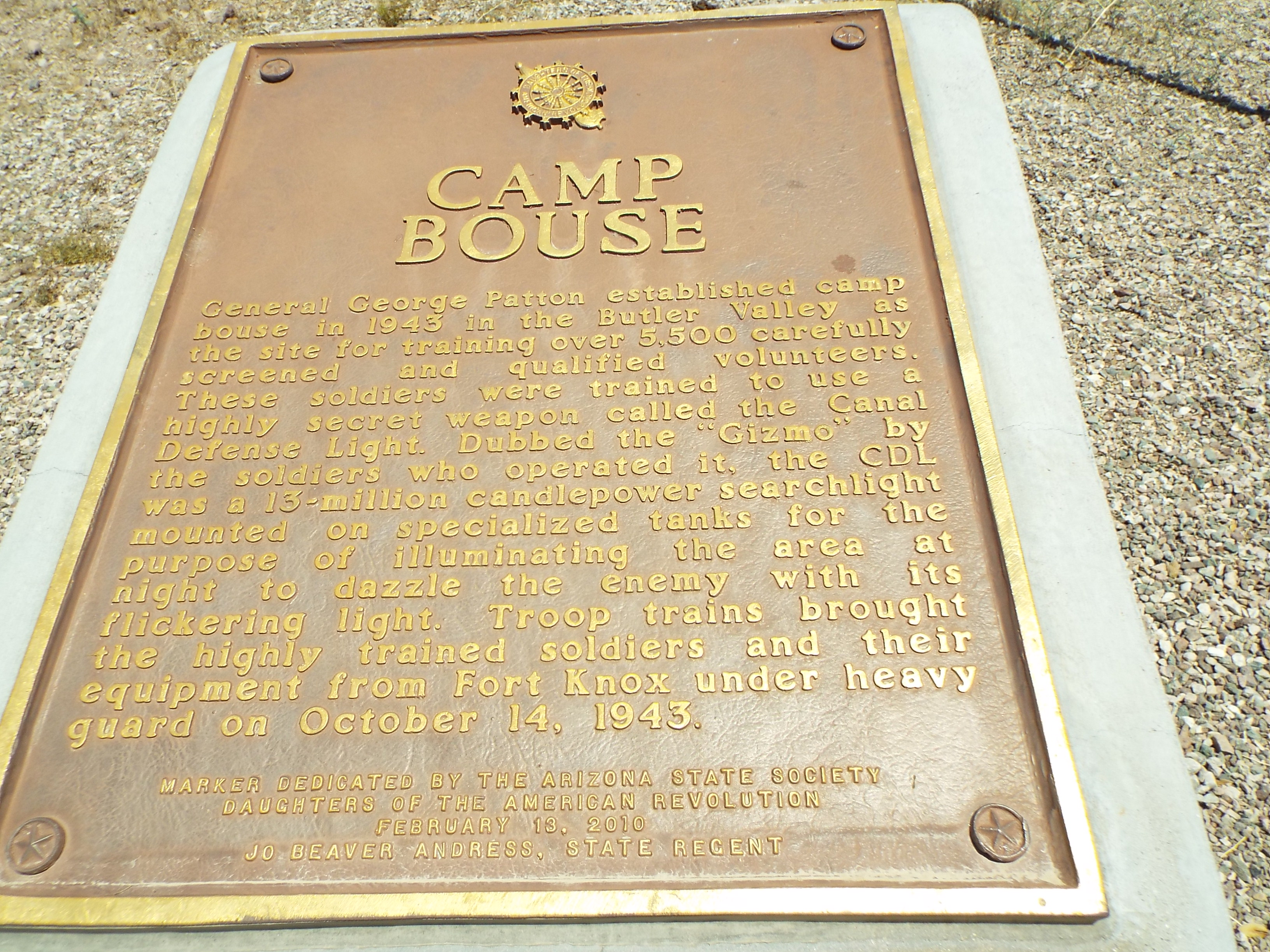
Camp Bouse historical marker.

During World War II, the US Army established Camp Bouse in the town, a top secret tank training camp, under the command of General George S. Patton. The soldiers who trained in the camp were not allowed to discuss anything in regard to their training with outsiders. The 526th Armored Infantry Battalion, the 554th Ordnance Heavy Maintenance Company, the 9th Tank Group and the 701st., 736th and 740th Tank Battalions trained in Camp Bouse. The 739th (SP) (ME) and the 748th "The Rhinos" also trained there.

The 554th Tank Battalion arrived in Utah Beach in Normandy, France in 1944. They were involved in the Battle of the Bulge. The 701st Tank Battalion fought in Central Europe, Northern France and the Rhineland.

Camp Bouse was closed in April 1944. The men serving in the camp were transferred to Fort Knox, Kentucky and then to Kilmer, New Jersey. They were eventually sent to England for further combat training.

== Historic properties ==
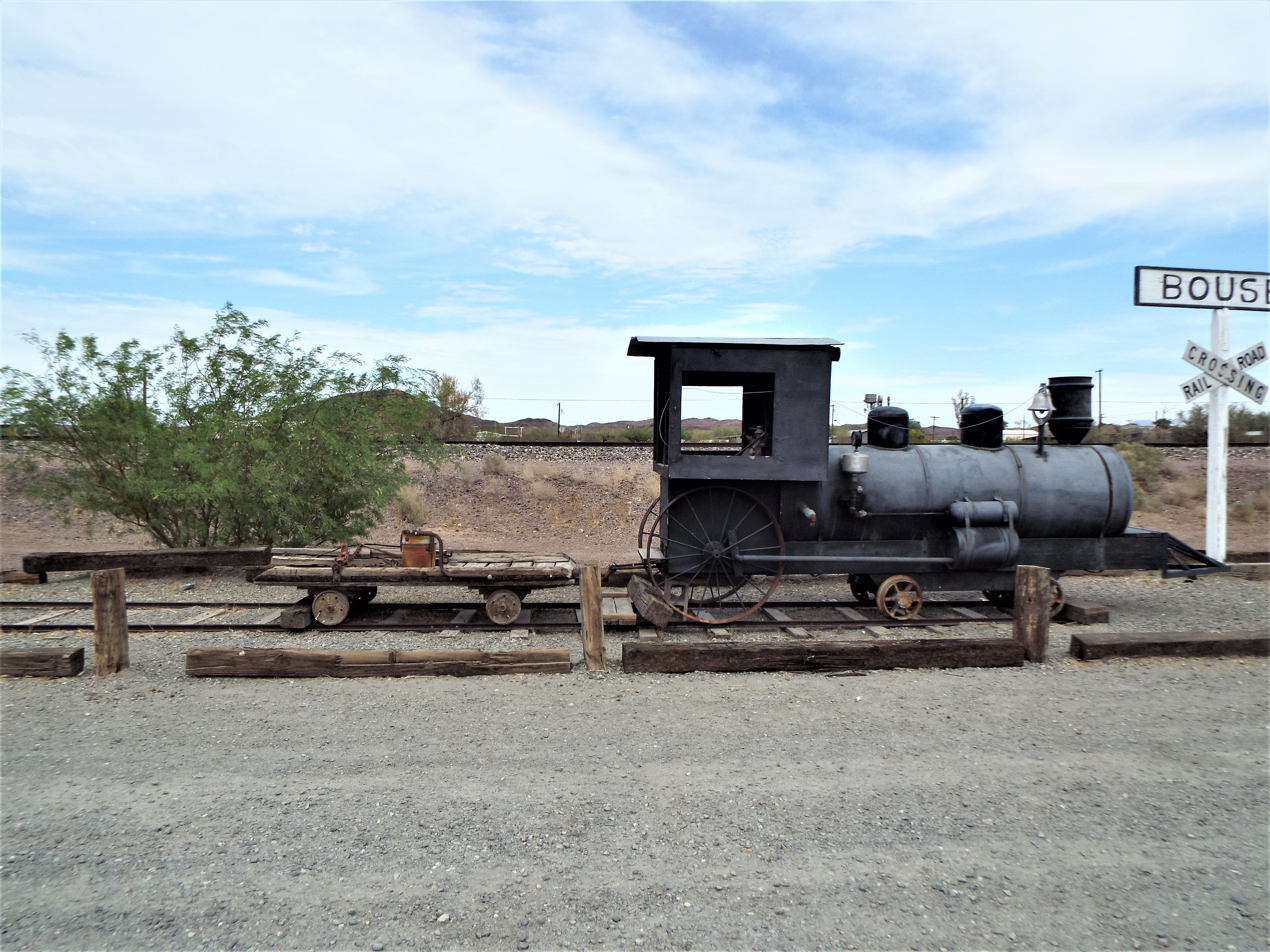
Small steam operated locomotive used in the mines

The following are some of the historic mining properties and artifacts whose images are included in this list. Also, some of the vehicles and tanks used during the World War II top secret training that went on in Camp Bouse.

- The 1902 Assay building which now houses the Bouse Chamber of Commerce.
- A 1908 work shop.
- Mining equipment used in Bouse.
- Two of the town's early structures
- Ruins of Camp Bouse.
- "Sandy" the M60 Patton Tank, with her 105 MM main gun.
- Various training vehicles that were used in Camp Bouse and left behind.
- The ruins of the 1892 Thomas Bouse house.

== Historic structures pictured ==
The following are the images of the historic structures in Bouse and its surrounding areas.

Historic Camp Bouse, Arizona

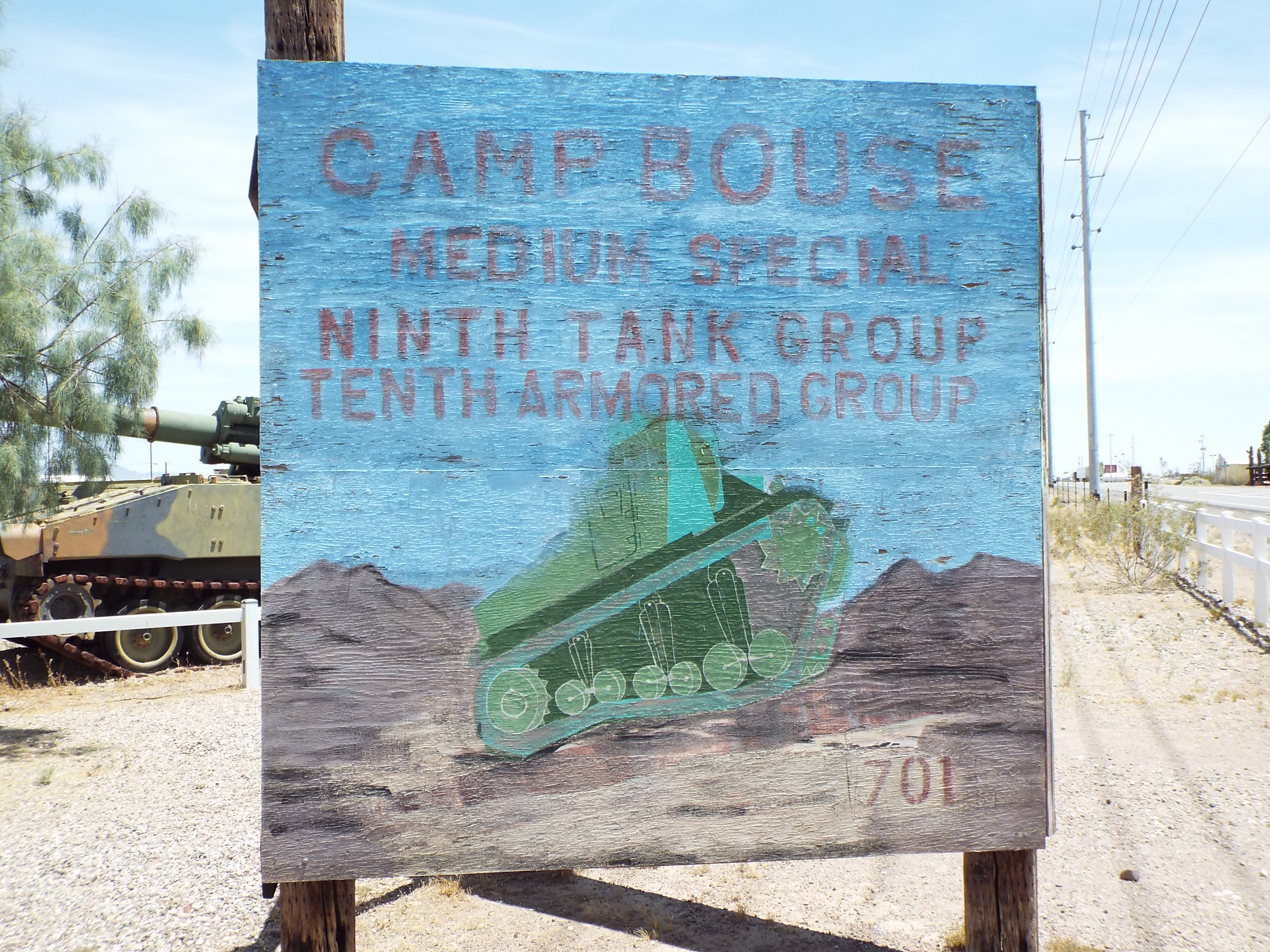
Camp Bouse sign..

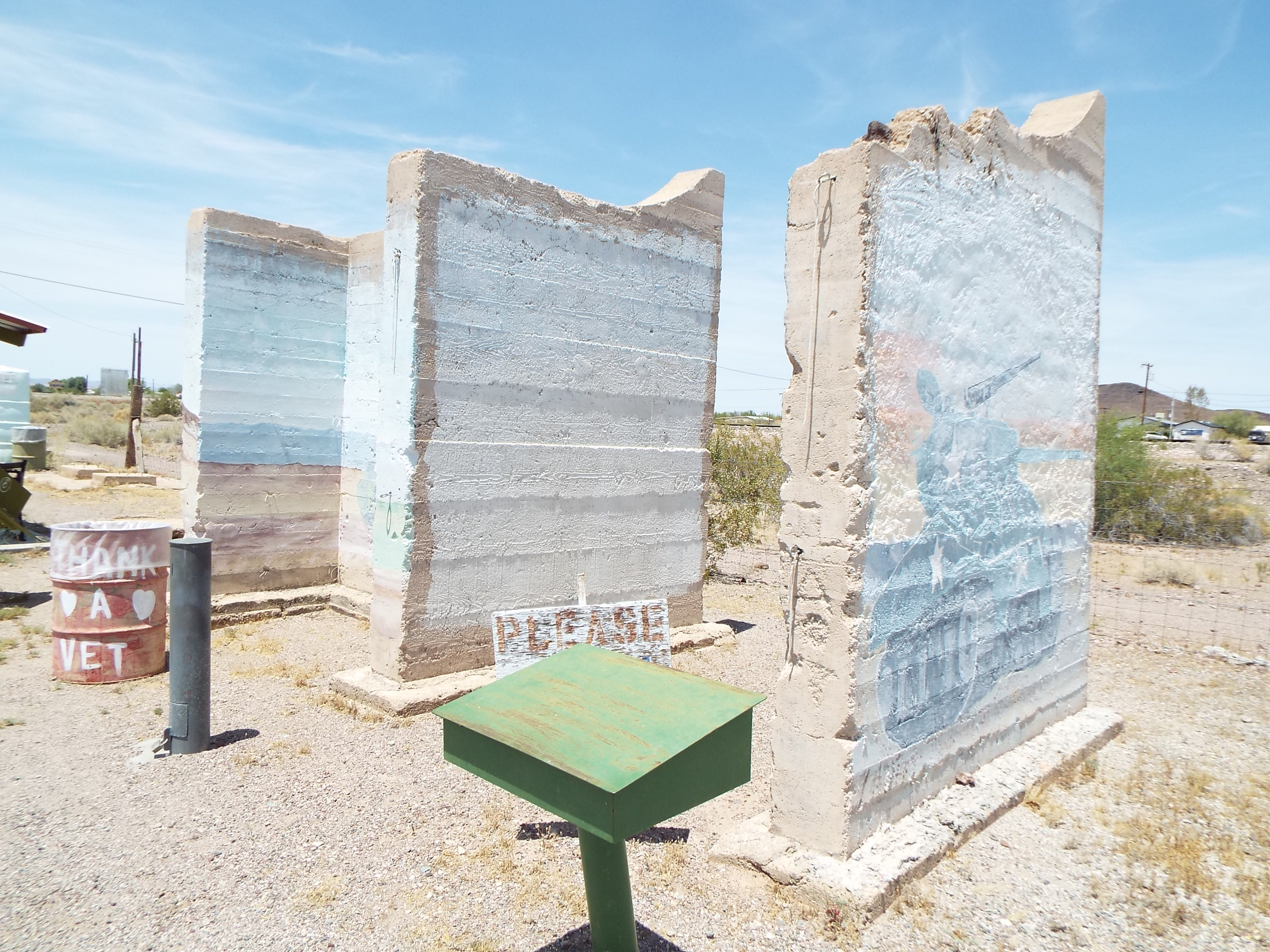
Ruins of Camp Bouse.

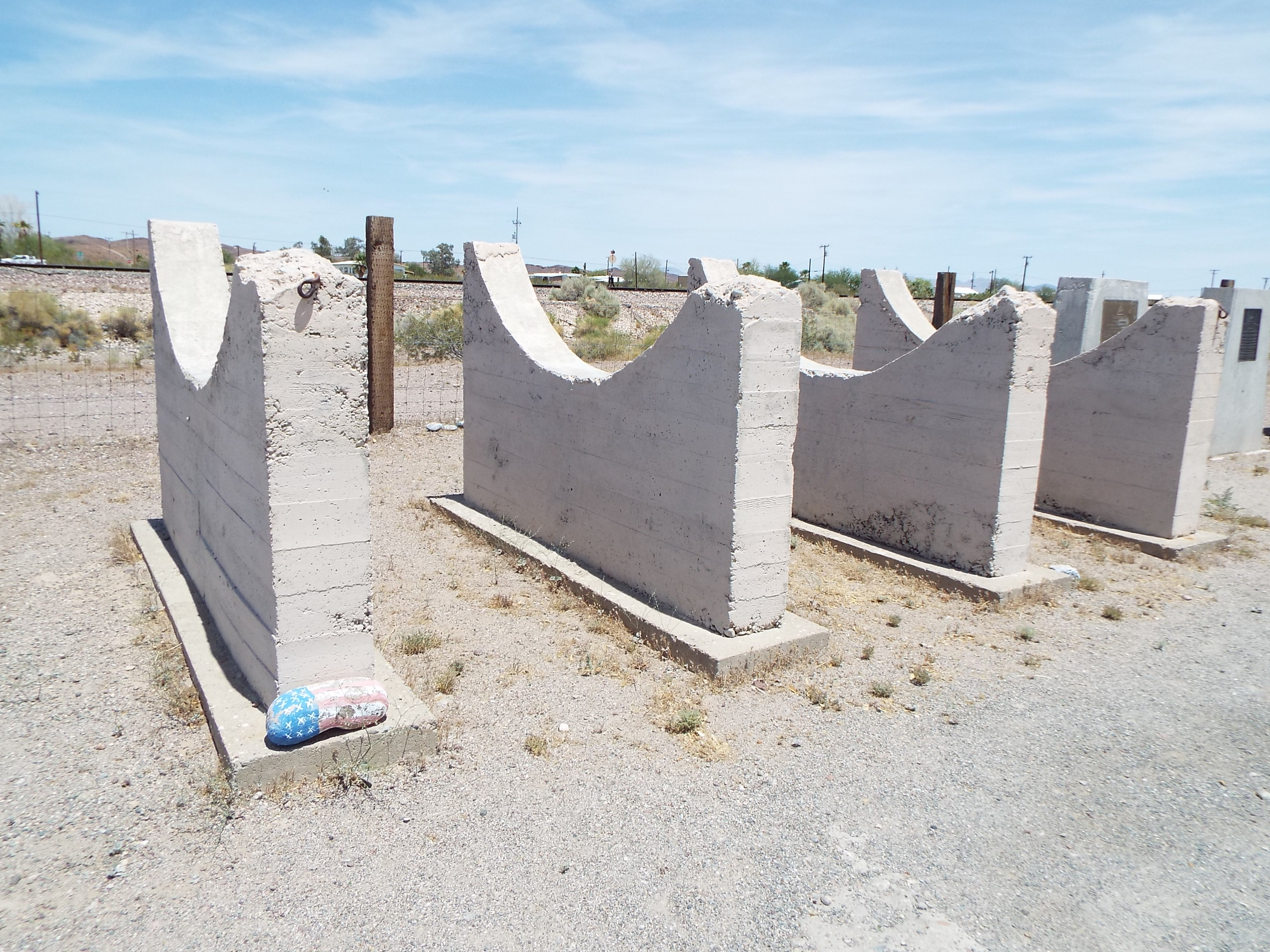
More ruins of Camp Bouse.

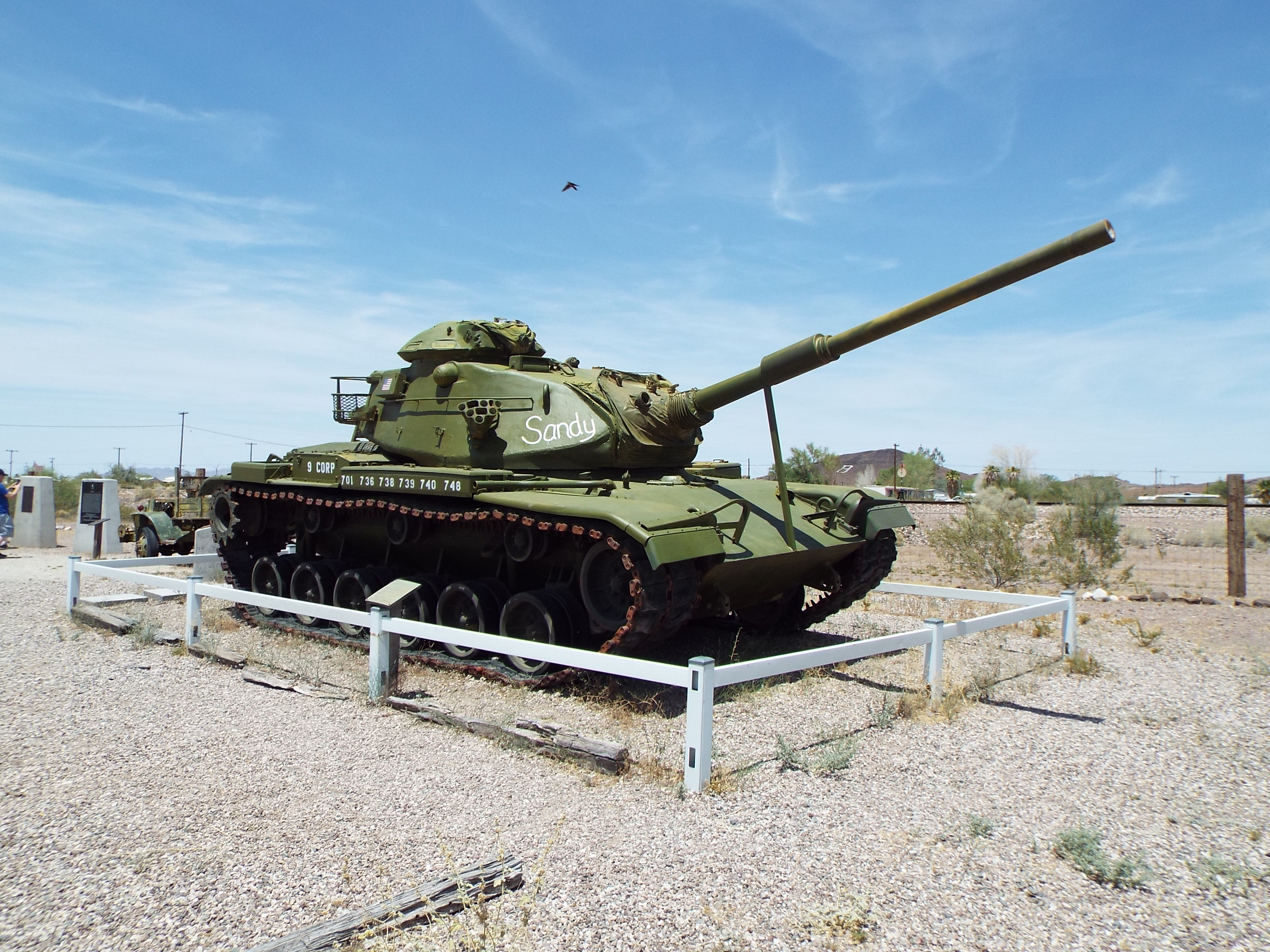
”Sandy” the M60 Patton Tank, with her 105 MM main gun.

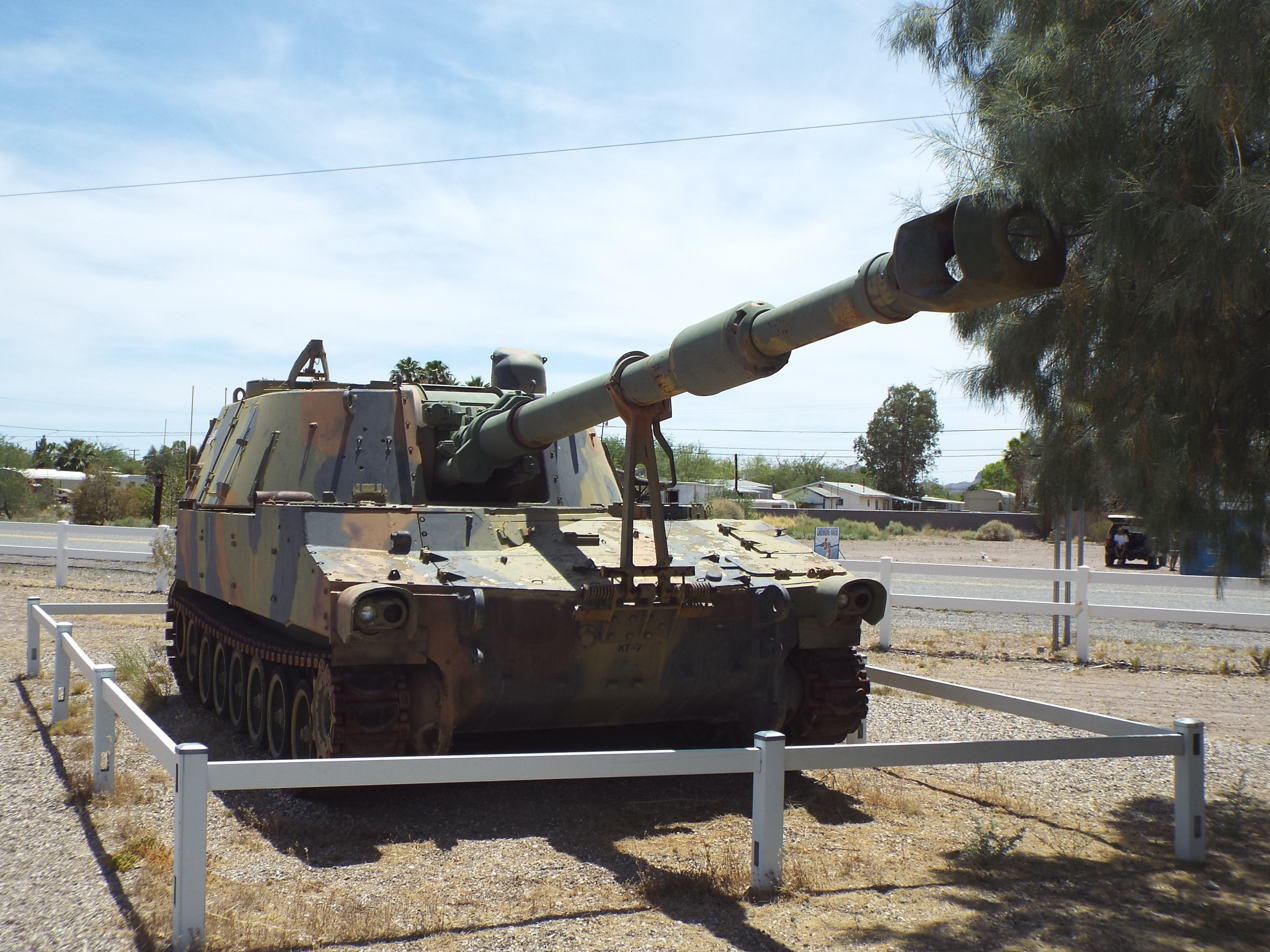
Patton training Tank.

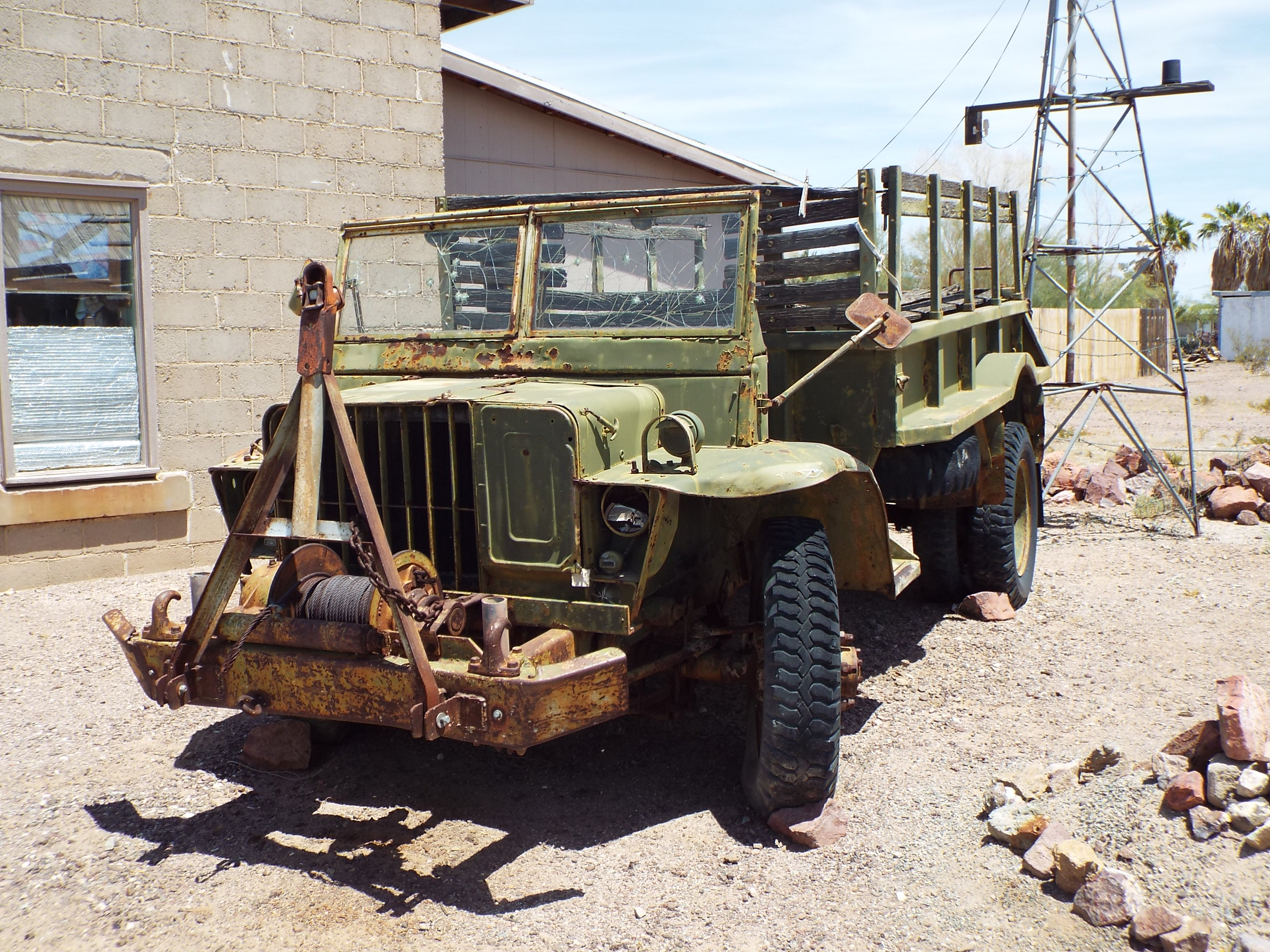
World War II Military Vehicle.

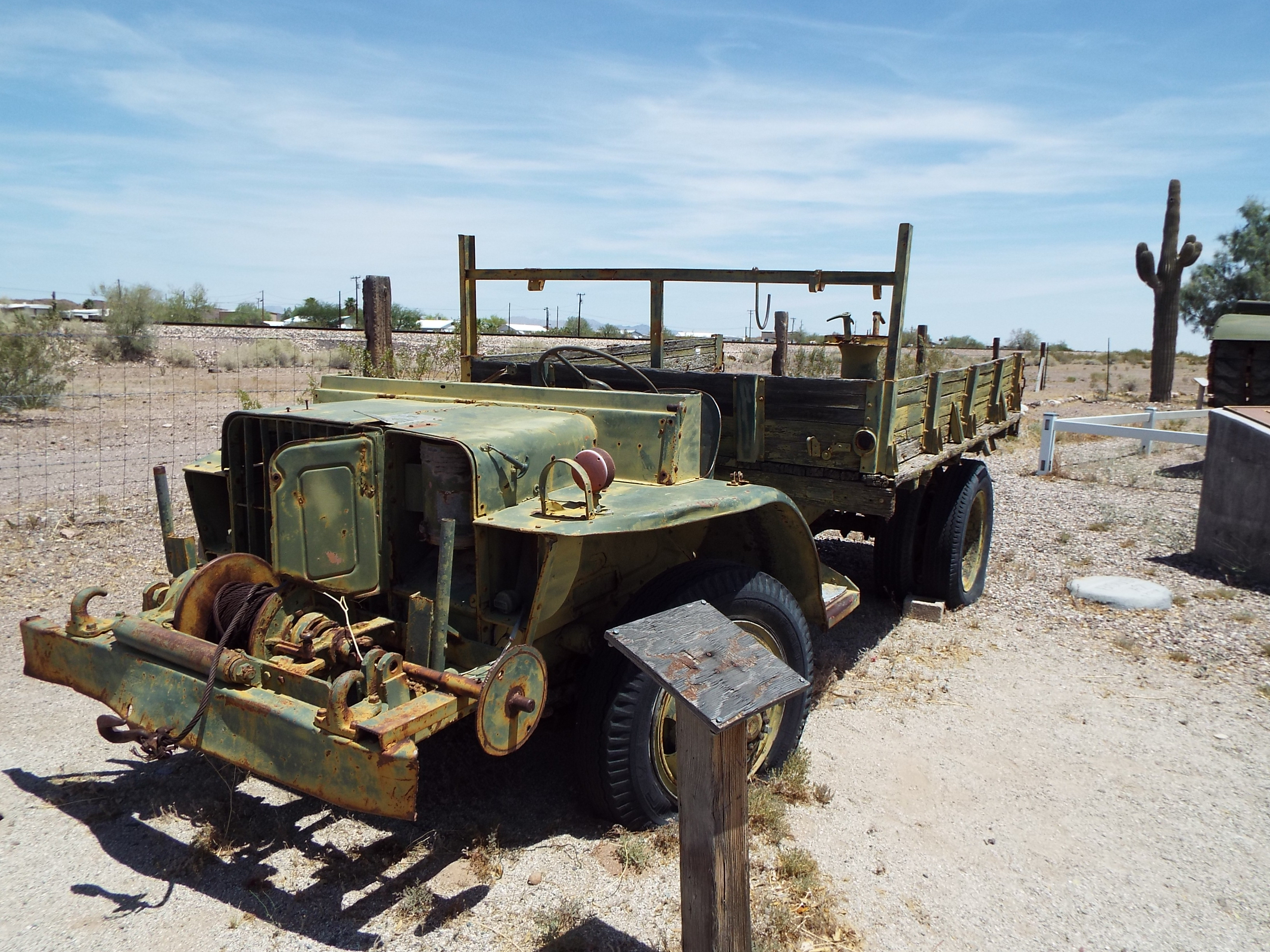
Another World War II Military Vehicle left behind.
Historic Structures
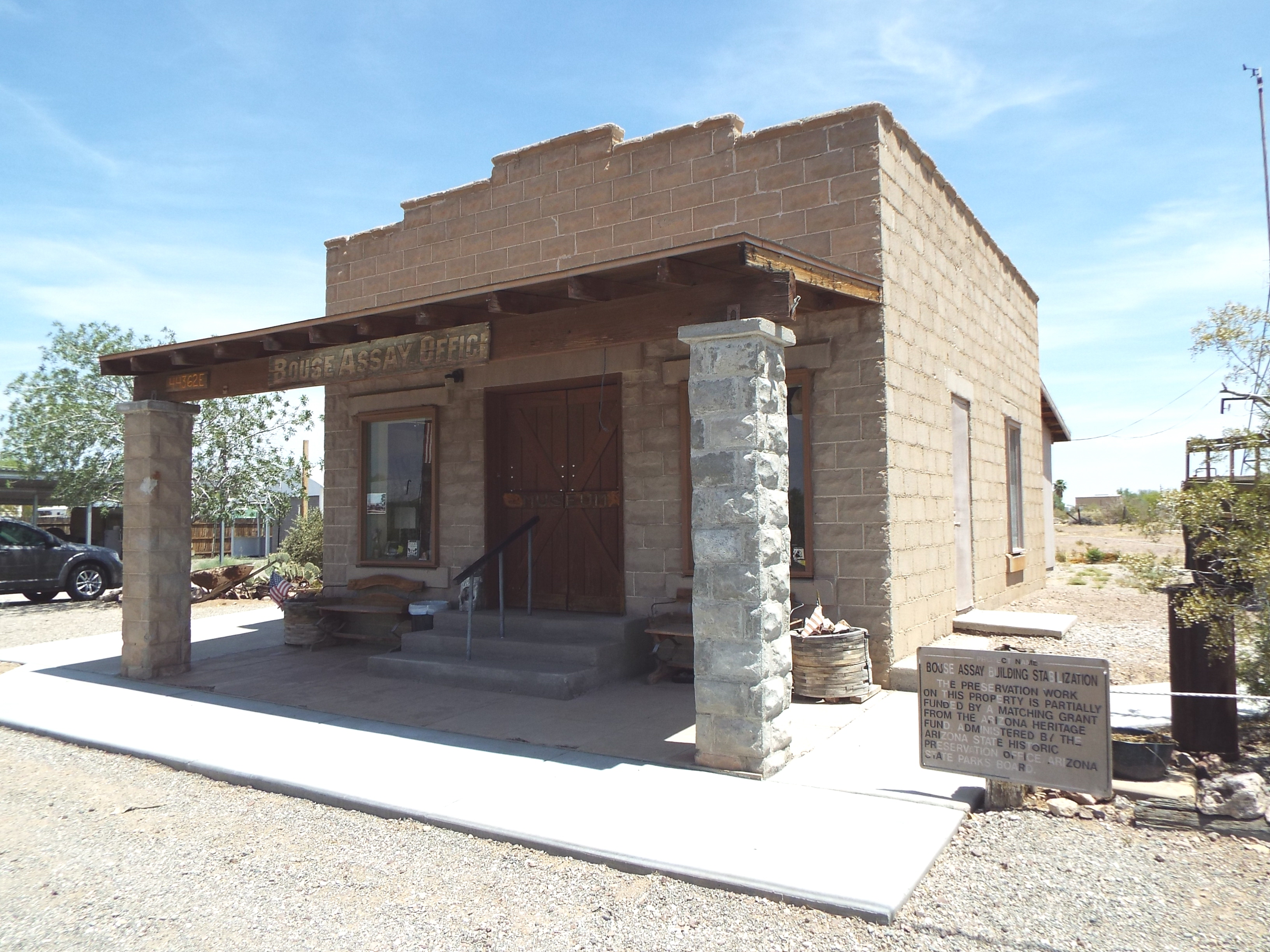
1902 Assay building which now houses the Bouse Chamber of Commerce.

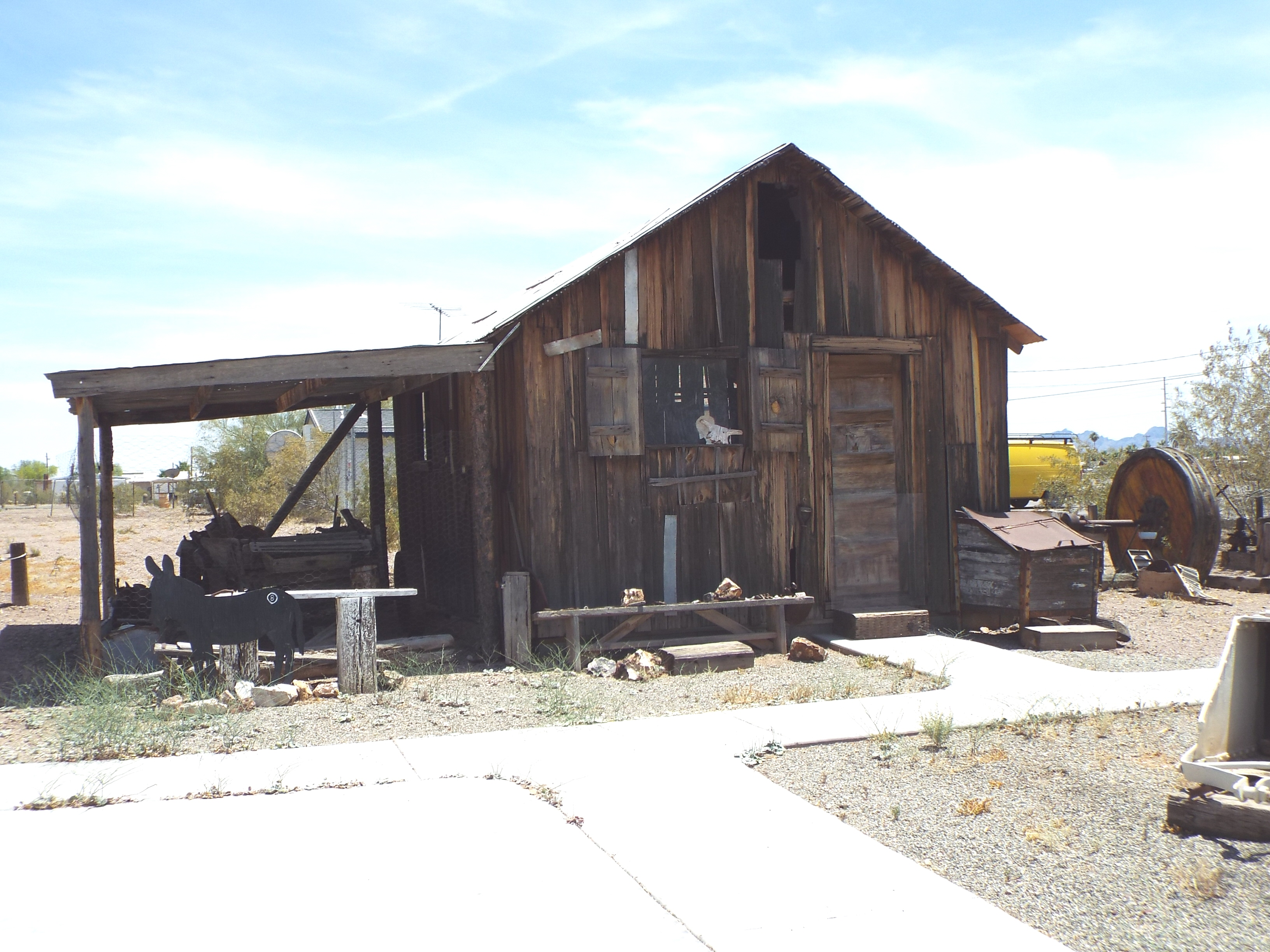
A 1908 mining work shop.

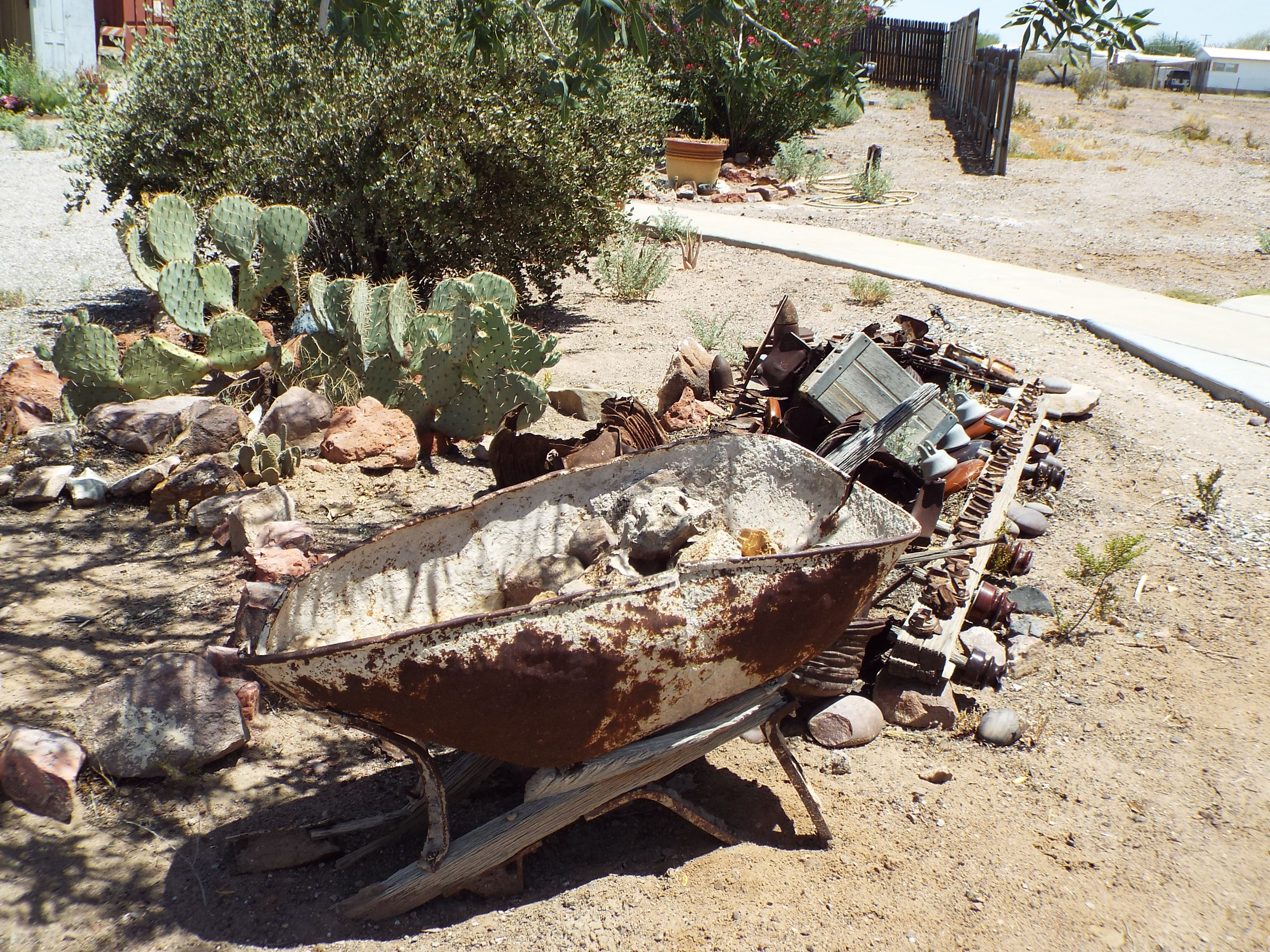
Bouse mining equipment.

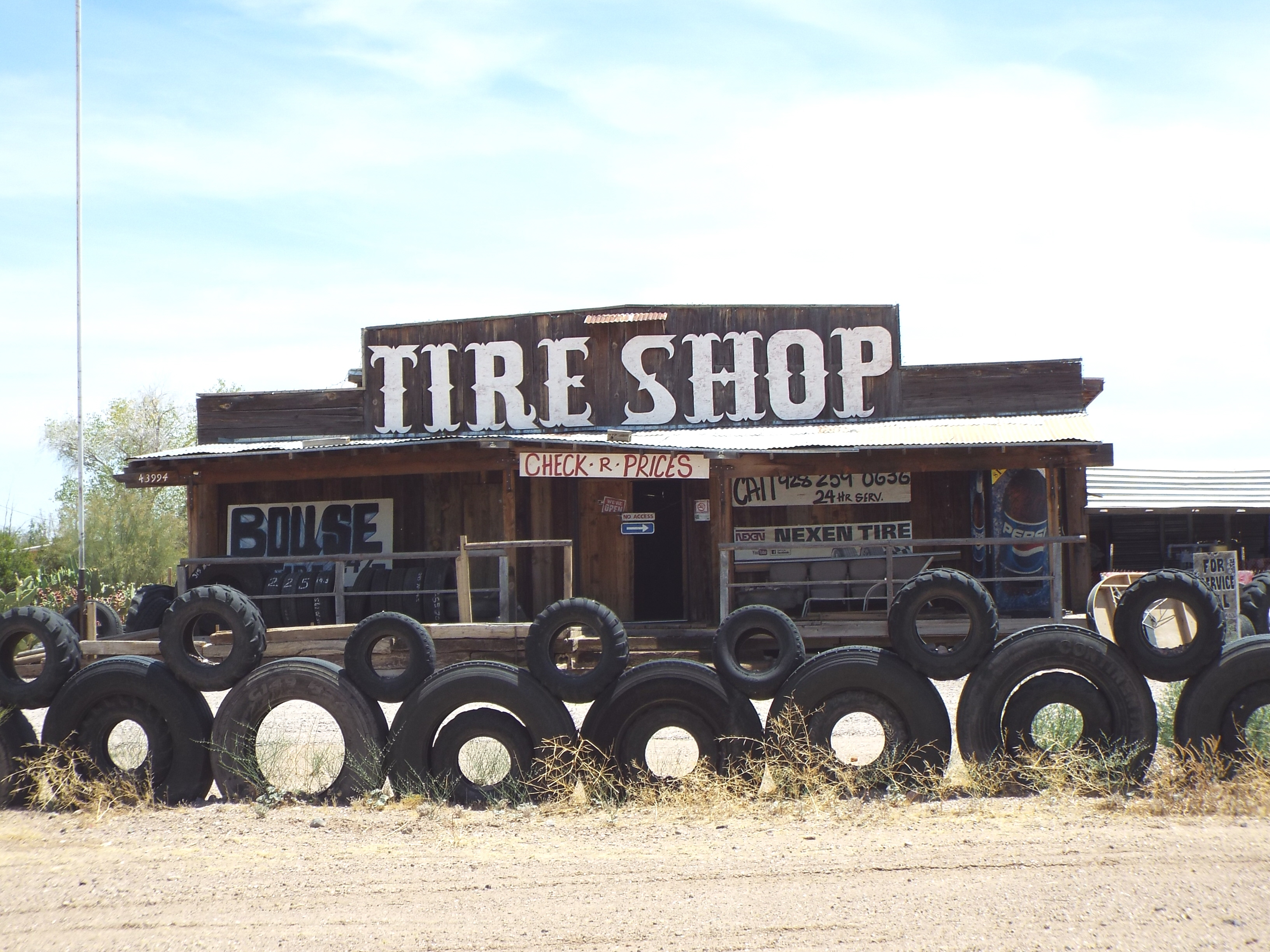
Early Bouse structure.

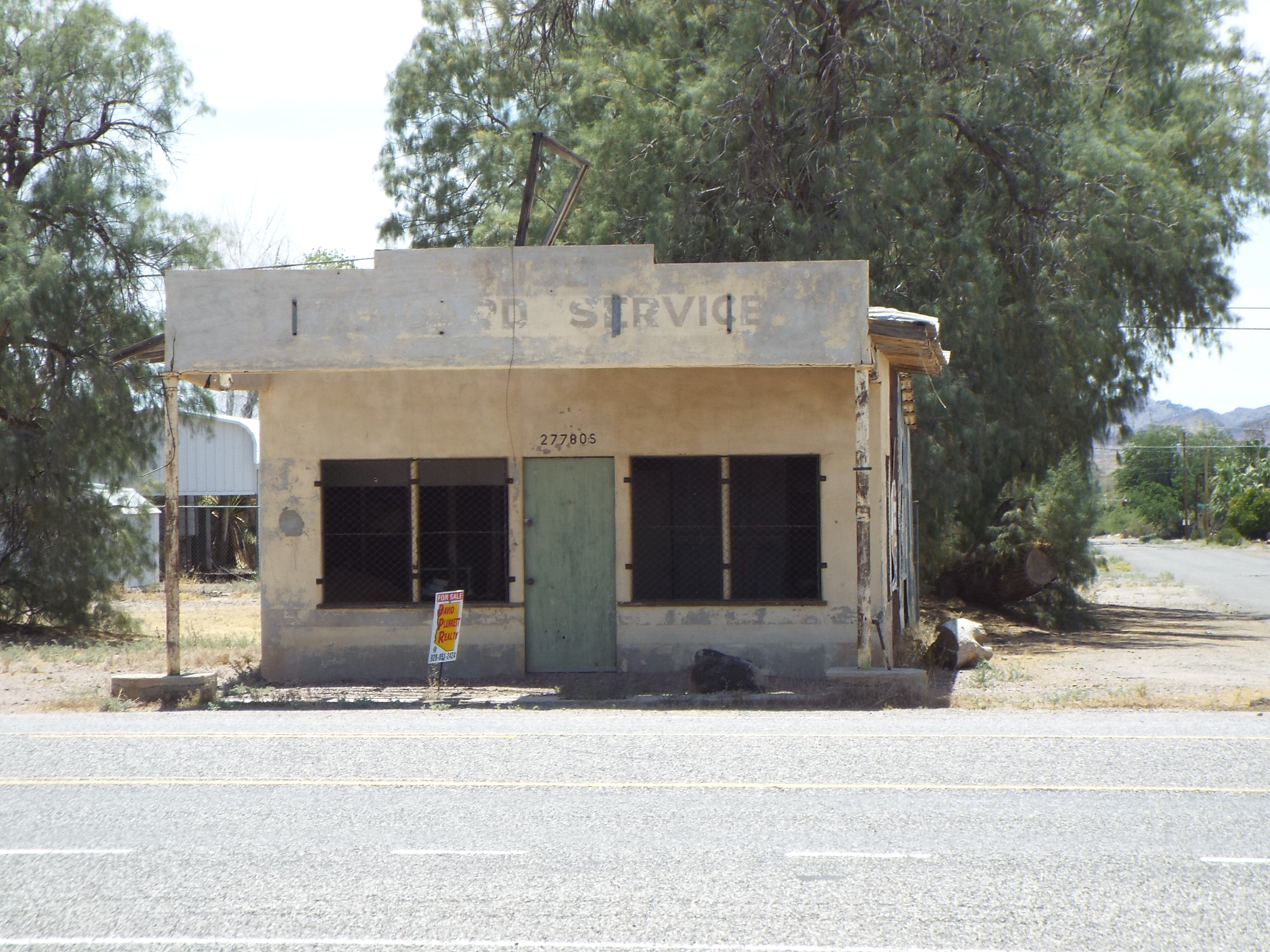
1920s Bouse building
Historic Thomas Bouse house

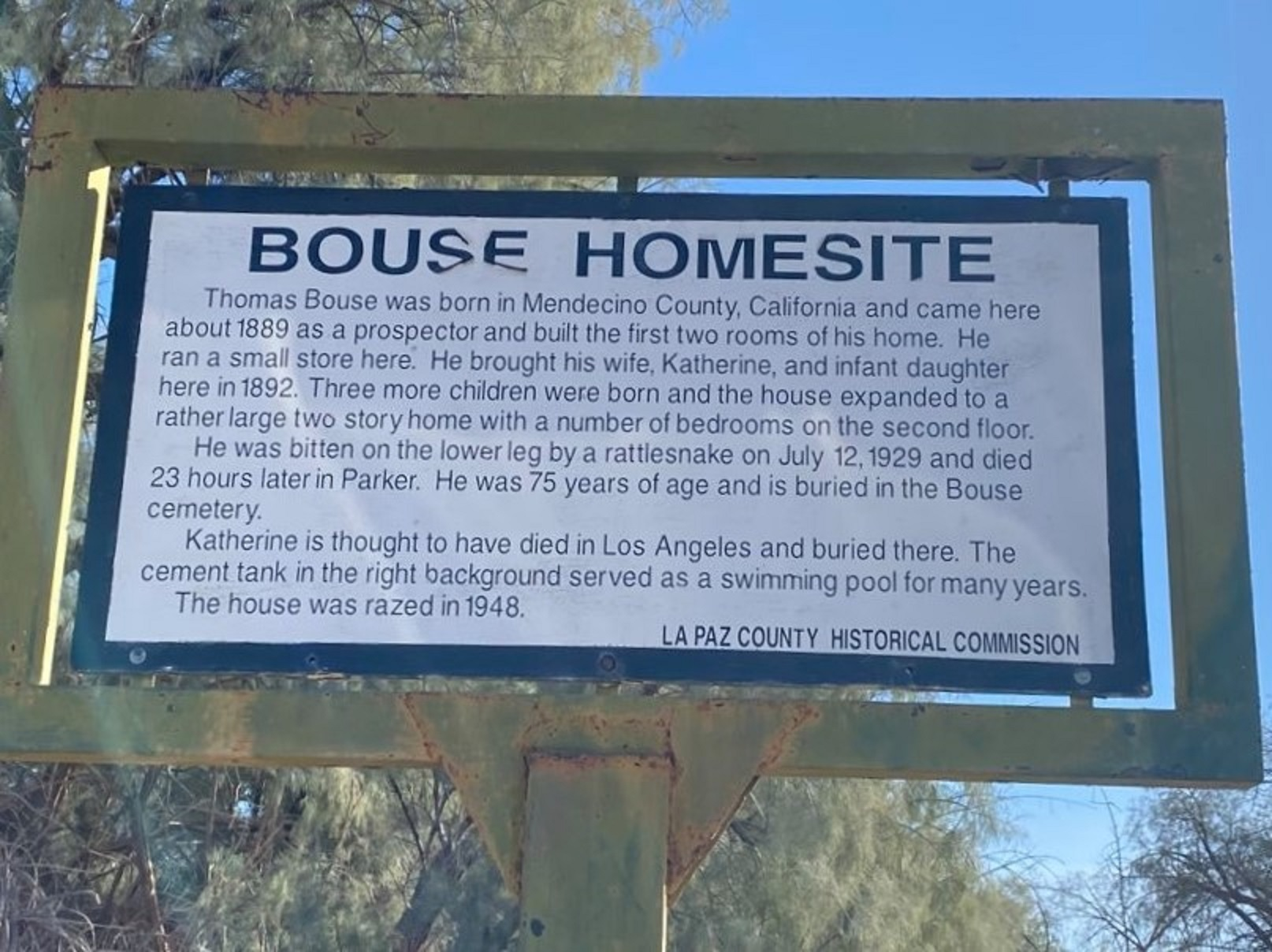
Thomas Bouse house marker.

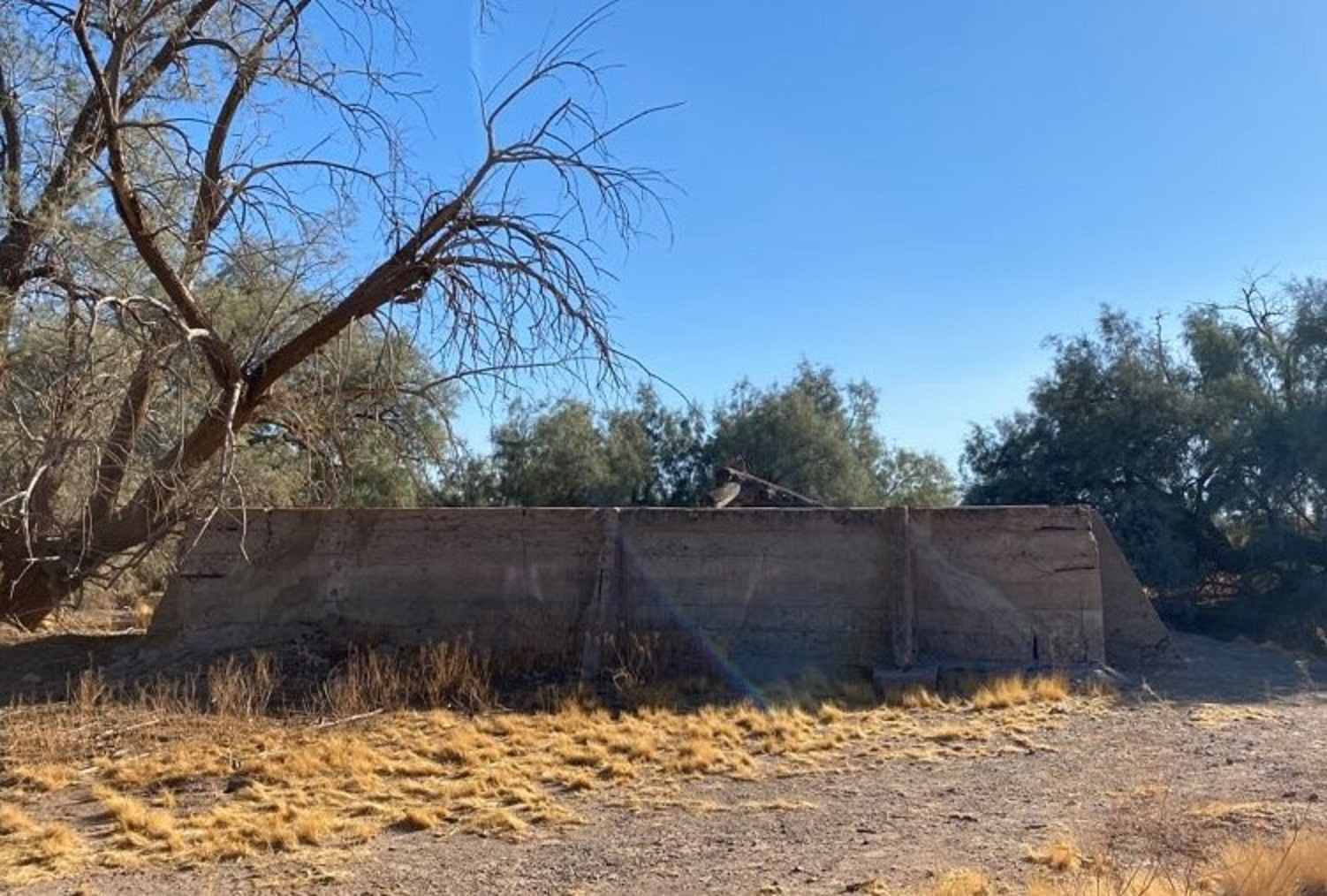
Thomas Bouse house ruins – 1892-1

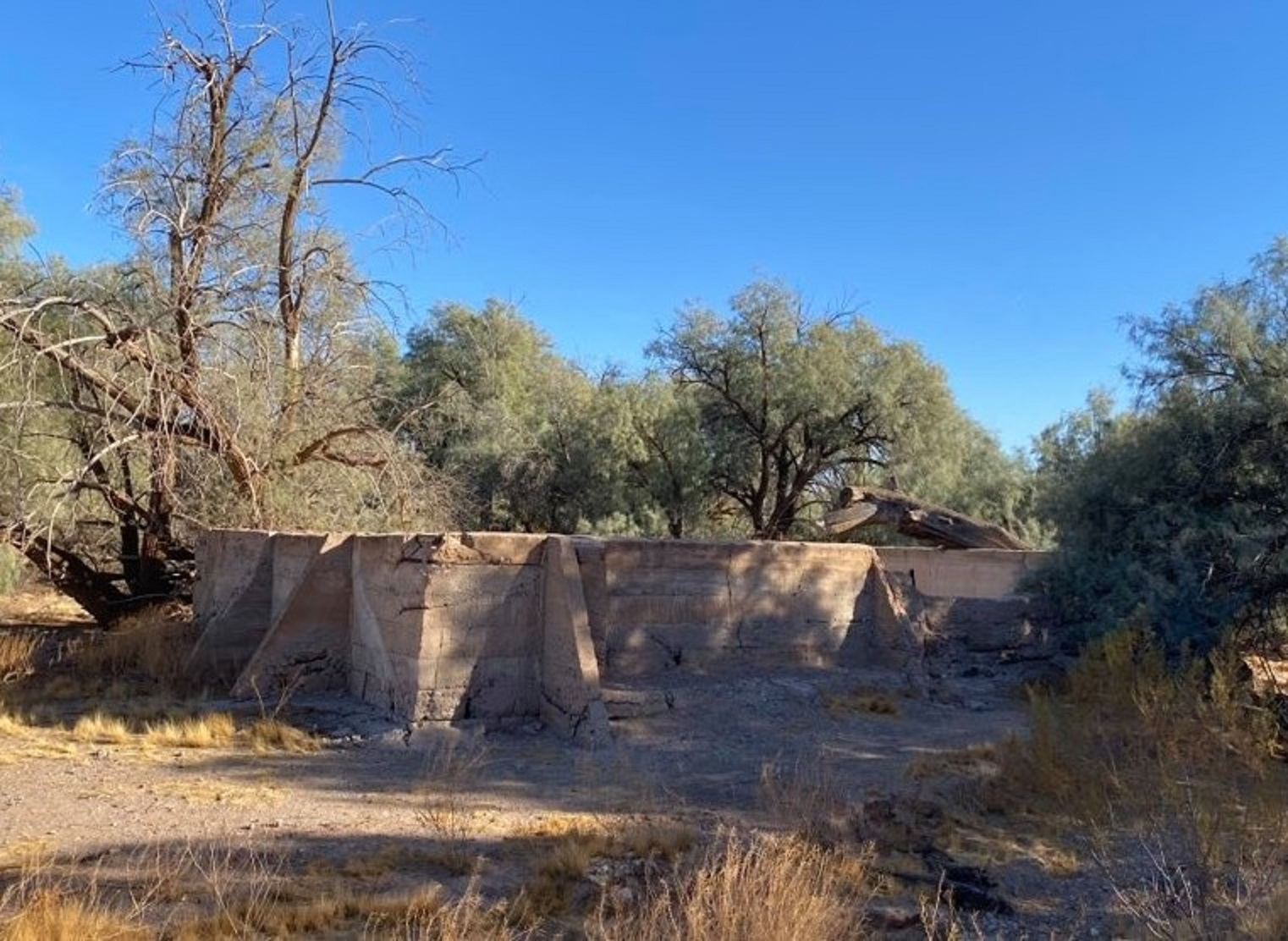
Thomas Bouse house ruins – 1892-2

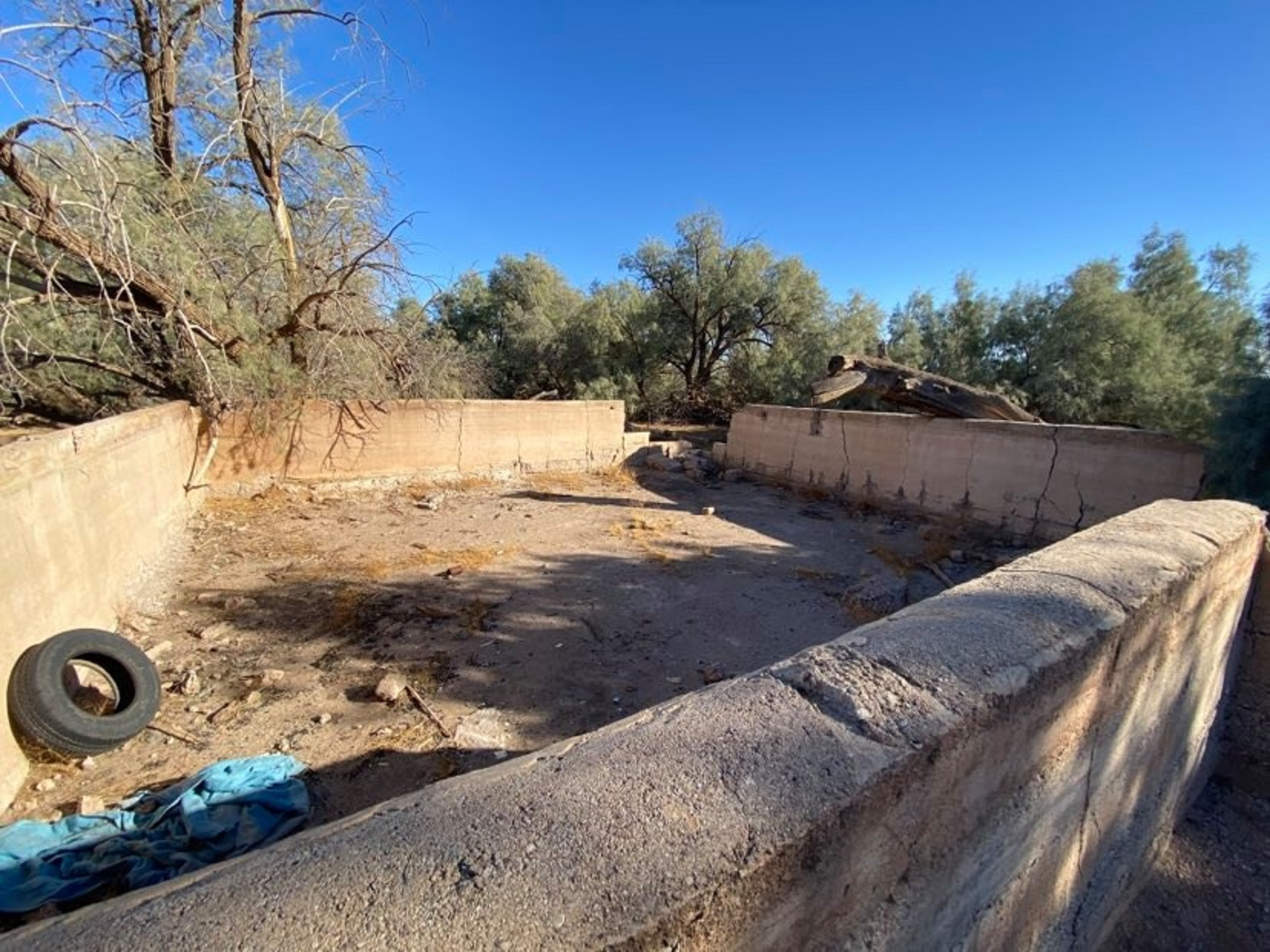
Thomas Bouse house ruins – 1892-3

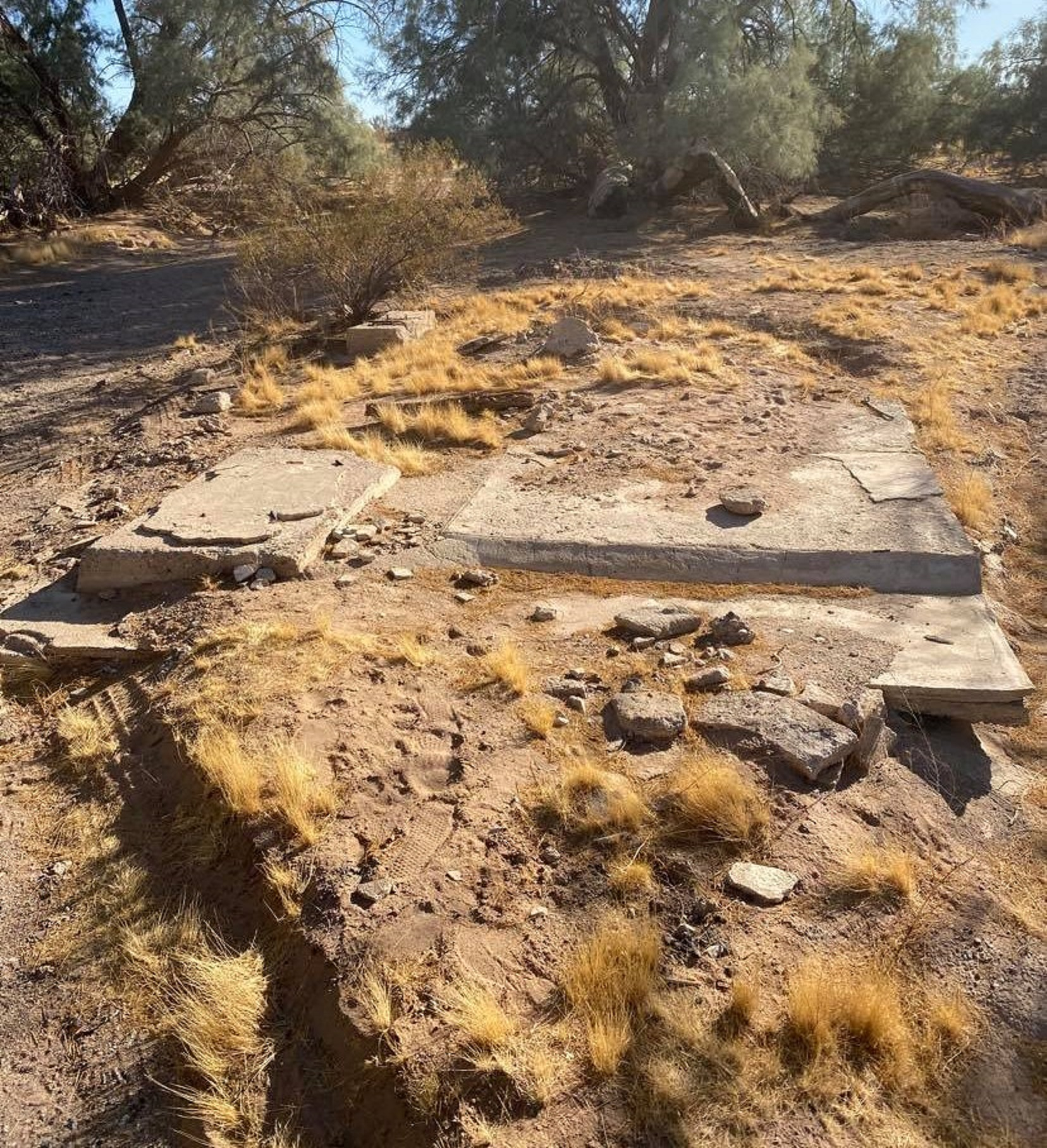
Thomas Bouse house ruins – 1892-4

== See also ==
- National Register of Historic Places listings in La Paz County, Arizona
