= Canal Defence Light =

Offensive armoured combat searchlight

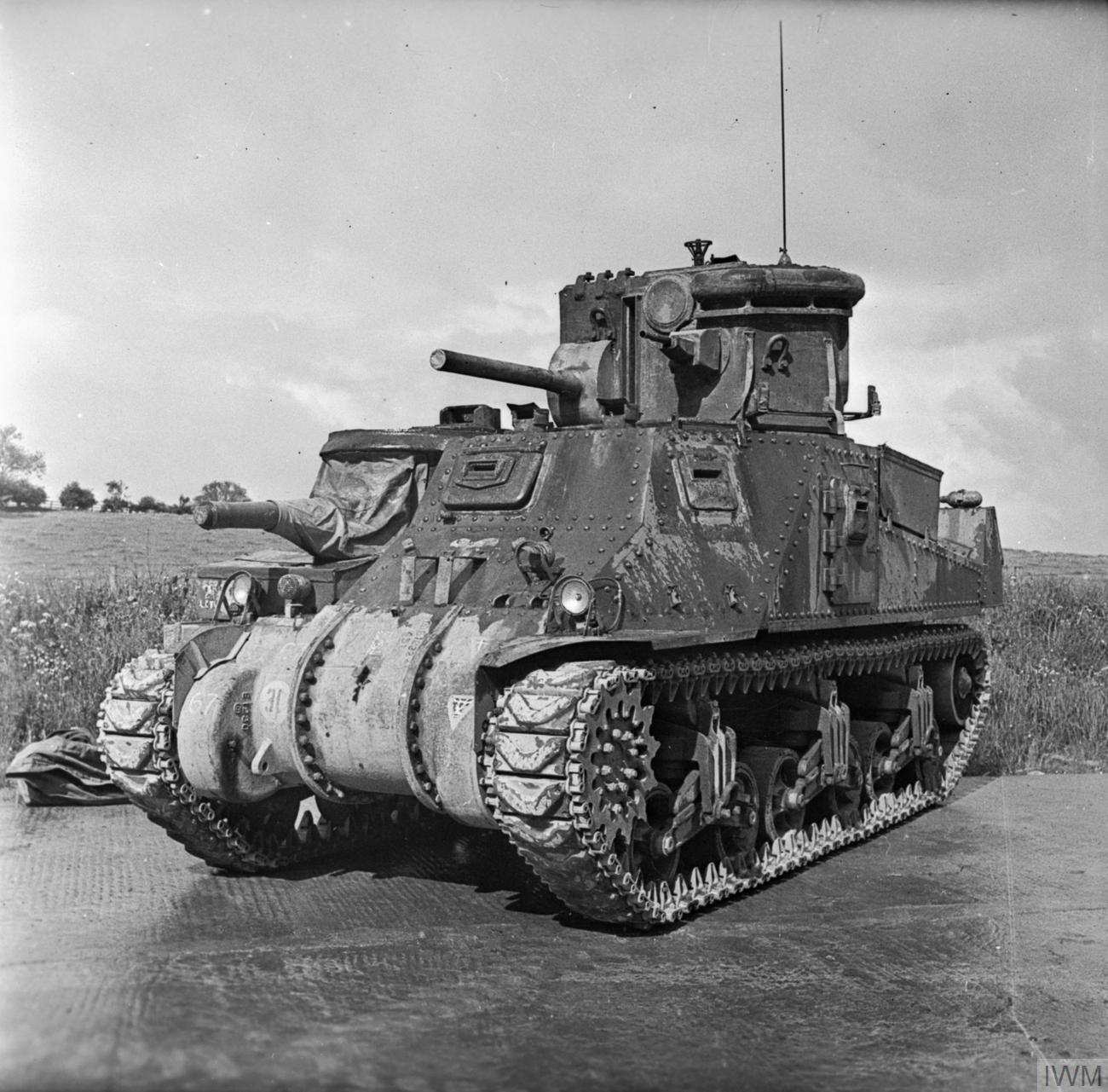
- A CDL turret fitted to a M3 Grant tank; the CDL turret is fitted with a dummy gun
- Type: Non–lethal weapon
- Place of origin: United Kingdom

Service history
- Used by: British Army; United States Army
- Wars: World War II

Production history
- Designer: A V M Mitzakis
- No. built: 300 (Matilda variant); 335 (M3 variant)

The Canal Defence Light (CDL) was a British "secret weapon" of the Second World War, based upon the use of a powerful carbon-arc searchlight mounted on a tank. It was intended to be used during night-time attacks, when the light would allow enemy positions to be targeted. A secondary use of the light would be to dazzle and disorientate enemy troops, making it harder for them to return fire accurately. The name Canal Defence Light was used to conceal the device's true purpose. For the same reason, in US service they were designated T10 Shop Tractor.

== Description ==
The idea is credited to a Greek citizen, Marcel Mitzakis, who devised the system for the de Thoren Syndicate in the 1930s; they were advised by J F C Fuller. The device was demonstrated to the British War Office in 1937. Although three examples were ordered for tests, the trials did not begin until 1940, when the War Office took over and ordered 300 lights for fitting to tanks. A prototype was constructed using a Matilda II tank. The tank's normal turret was replaced with a cylindrical one containing both a 13 million candlepower (12.8 million candela) searchlight and a machine gun.

The searchlight turret included a station for an operator, who had the task of changing the light's carbon electrodes when they burned out. The light emerged from a vertical slit that was just 2 inches (5.1 cm) wide by 24 inches (61 cm) tall, a small size which reduced the chance of battle damage to the optical system. The beam diverged at 19° horizontally and 1.9° vertically, forming a pool of light of around 34 by 340 yards (31 m × 311 m) at a distance of 1,000 yards (910 m). The turret could rotate 360° and the light beam could be elevated or lowered by 10° from the horizontal.

Blue and amber filters allowed the light to be coloured as well as white. A shutter could flash the beam on and off, up to twice a second. It was found that the blue light caused the CDL tank to appear to be at a greater distance, and blue and amber light beams from two CDL tanks could combine to illuminate a target with white. A flashing beam would further dazzle and disorient enemy troops by not giving their eyes a chance to adapt to either light or darkness.

The Matilda tank was later replaced by the US M3 Grant, which was superior in several ways. It was a larger, roomier and better-armoured tank, also faster and better able to keep up with tanks such as the Sherman. It was armed with a 75 mm gun mounted in the hull and a 37 mm gun in a turret, so could retain some fighting capacity when the searchlight turret was mounted. A dummy gun-barrel fitted to the turret made it resemble a normal M3 tank. The operator was the only occupant of the turret—the vehicle commander had a seat to the left of the driver.

The project was shrouded in secrecy. It was tested during Exercise Primrose in 1943 at Tighnabruaich, Scotland; it was concluded that it was "too uncertain to be depended upon as the main feature of an invasion".

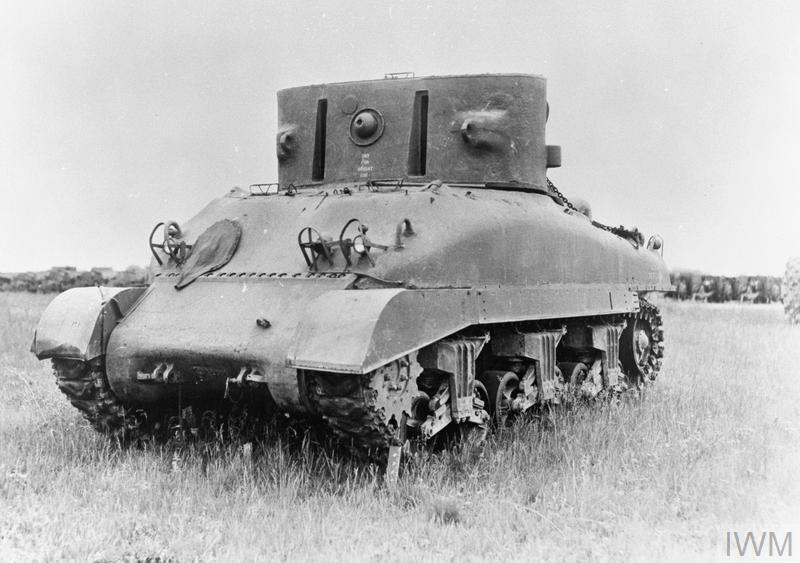
An American-built T10E1 Shop Tractor, January 1943

The CDL was shown to senior US officers (including generals Eisenhower and Clark) in 1942 and the US decided to produce their own tanks using the CDL design. The codenames "Leaflet" for the tank, and "Cassock" for the training programme for crews were used. For secrecy the construction was dispersed. Conversion of the M3 to take the CDL was by the American Locomotive Company as "Shop Tractor M10", turrets were produced by Pressed Steel Car Company as "coast defence turrets", and the arc lamps were sourced through the Corps of Engineers. The final assembly of the CDL tank was at Rock Island Arsenal. By the end of 1944, Alco had produced 497 tanks.

American crews were trained at Fort Knox and in the California-Arizona manoeuvre area. The six battalions of tanks then moved to the UK to join the British CDL tanks in Wales.

== Deployment and combat ==
The British and American CDL units deployed to the continent did not cross over to France until August, the British as part of the 79th Armoured Division. The British 35th Tank Brigade and US 9th Armored Group were retained in the UK. The system was highly secret as surprise was considered essential to its use. This hampered its employment, as commanders were often unfamiliar with, or did not know of it, and did not consider it when drawing up plans for attack.

Rather than let trained tank crews sit idle, most of the special units were converted either to other special roles (such as mine clearance tanks) or regular tank units.

For the crossing of the Rhine, some CDL units were used. The one British squadron that had not been converted from CDLs was used in the north, 64 American CDL tanks were brought back into use with their former crews. The US tanks were spread across the First, Third and Ninth armies.

=== Bridge at Remagen ===
The Allies used the CDLs to protect the Ludendorff Bridge after it was captured intact during the Battle of Remagen. The Germans used virtually every weapon at their disposal to try to destroy the bridge. This included sending frogmen, using Italian underwater breathing apparatus, to plant floating mines but they were discovered by US Army military police, who used Canal Defence Lights to locate and blind the swimmers.

The armour of the CDLs made them more suitable for this task than conventional searchlights as, in some sectors, the East bank of the river was held by German forces who subjected the CDL tanks to considerable artillery and small-arms fire. The use of the system resembled its name, which had been intended to be spurious. Later, the battle moved eastwards and the CDLs were used to illuminate the bridges for the benefit of engineers carrying out maintenance. Conventional searchlights would have been more suitable, but none were available. The CDLs were eventually replaced by captured German searchlights.

== Operators ==
The 11th Royal Tank Regiment was raised in January 1941 and designated for the CDL role in May 1941. The unit trained at Lowther Castle near Penrith, and was based at Lowther Park, Brougham Hall, Carleton and Greystoke Castle, Cumberland, in what was (and is) a remote but well-connected area (having good transport links). It spent 1942 and 1943 in the Middle East without seeing action, returning to the UK in April 1944. It landed in Normandy on 12 August 1944, seeing no action until 29 September 1944, when it was ordered to transfer all of its equipment to the 42nd and 49th Royal Tank Regiments, and was retrained to operate the American amphibious LVT-4, known by the British Army as the Buffalo Mark IV. It was replaced at the CDL school by the 35th Tank Brigade (consisting of the 49th Royal Tank Regiment and the 152nd Regiment, Royal Armoured Corps) and part of the 79th Armoured Division. Around 6,000 personnel were involved.

In their turn, the 42nd and 49th Royal Tank Regiments were largely inactive for the remainder of the war and all three units were disbanded after the end of hostilities.

Battalions of the American 9th Tank Group trained using the Grant variant of the CDL tank at Camp Bouse in the Arizona desert. In 1944, before deployment in the European Theatre of Operations, they continued training on the Preseli Hills in Pembrokeshire, West Wales.

Before dawn, at 06:00 on 18 November 1944, CDLs of the 357th Searchlight Battery, Royal Artillery provided hazy indirect light for the mine-clearing flail tanks supporting the infantry in Operation Clipper.

== Later use ==
Some British tanks were sent to India in 1945. The US Tenth Army requested deployment of CDL tanks for use during the Battle of Okinawa, but fighting there was over by the time they arrived.

During the Korean War, there was a requirement for searchlights on the battlefield. There was brief interest in resurrecting a CDL on an M4 Sherman design (T52) that had started in 1944, but it was recognised that four battalions could be equipped with normal searchlights for the cost of a single CDL tank.

== Surviving examples ==
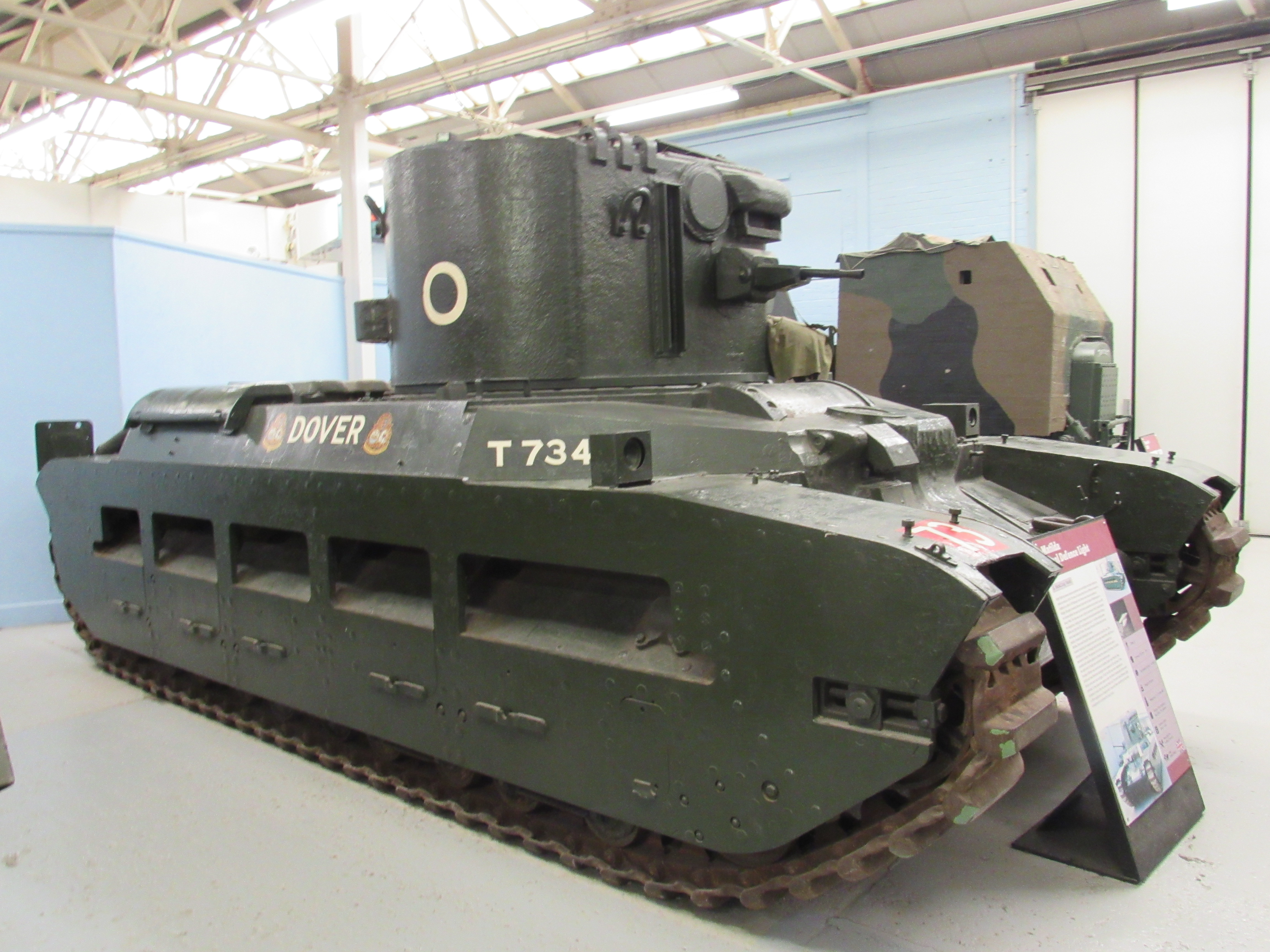
CDL-equipped Matilda II on display at The Tank Museum, Bovington, England.

The only surviving CDL-equipped Matilda tank is in the collection of the Royal Armoured Corps at The Tank Museum, Bovington, Dorset, in Britain. One CDL-equipped M3 Grant is displayed at Cavalry Tank Museum, Ahmednagar in India.

== See also ==
- Camp Bouse US test site.
- Leigh Light
- List of U.S. military vehicles by supply catalog designation SNL G-193
- 1K17 Szhatie

== Bibliography ==
- Fuller, J.F.C. (1949). The Second World War - 1939-45 - A strategical and Tactical History. Duell, Sloan and Pearce.
- Hunnicutt, R.P. (1994) [1978]. Sherman - A History of the American Medium Tank. Presidio Press.
- Mullett, Michael A. (2022). A New history of Penrith: book VI: Penrith in the twentieth century, 1900-1974: essays on the public realm. Carlisle: Bookcase. pp. 1–346. ISBN 9781912181520.
