= Bouse Elementary School District =

School district in Arizona, United States

Bouse School District 26

Location
- P O Box S Bouse, Arizona 85325 United States
- Coordinates: 33.9134°N 113.9955°W

District information
- Schools: 1
- NCES District ID: 0401290

Students and staff
- Students: 40
- Teachers: 5.00 (on FTE basis)
- Student–teacher ratio: 8.00:1

Other information
- Website: www.bouseschool.org

Bouse School District 26 is a public school district based in La Paz County, Arizona, United States.
