= Bouse, Arizona =

CDP in La Paz County, Arizona

- Census-designated place
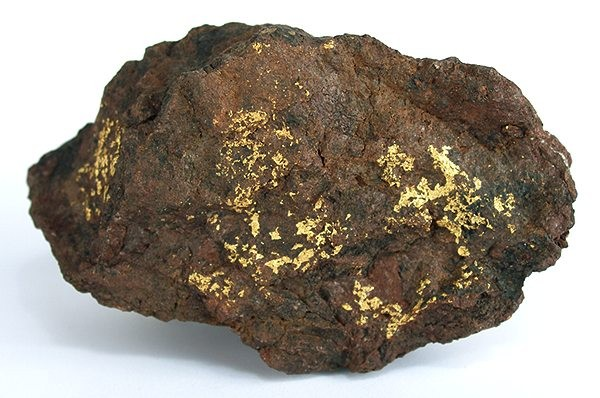
- Gold on hematite from the old Dutchman Mine near Bouse

- Location in La Paz County and the state of Arizona

- Location in the United States
- Coordinates: 34°00′20″N 113°59′50″W
- Country: United States
- State: Arizona
- County: La Paz

Area
  - Total: 136.17 sq mi (352.69 km^{2})
  - Land: 136.17 sq mi (352.69 km^{2})
  - Water: 0 sq mi (0.00 km^{2})
- Elevation: 981 ft (299 m)

Population (2020)
  - Total: 707
  - Density: 5.2/sq mi (2/km^{2})
- Time zone: UTC-7 (MST (no daylight saving time))
- ZIP code: 85325
- Area code: 928
- FIPS code: 04-07310
- GNIS feature ID: 2407894

Bouse (/ˈbaʊs/ BOWSS rhymes with "house") is a census-designated place (CDP) and ghost town in La Paz County, Arizona, United States. Founded in 1908 as a mining camp, the economy of Bouse is now based on tourism, agriculture, and retirees. The population was 707 at the 2020 census, down from 996 at the 2010 census. It was originally named Brayton after the store owner John Brayton Martin.

== Geography ==
Bouse is located north of the center of La Paz County. Arizona State Route 72 passes through the community, leading northwest 26 miles (42 km) to Parker and southeast 23 miles (37 km) to Hope.

According to the United States Census Bureau, the Bouse CDP has a total area of 136.2 square miles (352.8 km^{2}), all land.

Camp Bouse, 20 mi (32 km) east in Butler Valley, is the former site of a World War II US Army tank training camp. Although the buildings are gone, a few foundations remain, as do some of the tank tracks from World War II. There is a Camp Bouse memorial monument in Bouse.

== Demographics ==
Historical population
Census	Pop.	Note	%±
1920	167		—
1930	427		155.7%
1960	100		—
2000	615		—
2010	996		62.0%
2020	707		−29.0%
U.S. Decennial Census

Bouse first appeared on the 1920 U.S. Census as an unincorporated village, then in Yuma County. Although it did not appear separately as a village in 1930, the precinct it was located in, Bouse Precinct, had been contiguous with the village in 1920, and it reported a population of 427, which was majority White. Bouse's population was estimated as 100 in 1940, and also 100 in the 1960 census. It appeared again in 2000, when it was made a census-designated place (CDP), now within La Paz County.

As of the 2010 census, there were 996 people, 547 households, and 303 families residing in the CDP. The population density was 60.9 inhabitants per square mile (23.5/km^{2}). There were 562 housing units at an average density of 55.7 per square mile (21.5/km^{2}). The racial makeup of the CDP was 95.6% White, 0.3% Black or African American, 1.3% Native American, 0.2% Asian, 0.3% Pacific Islander, 0.8% from other races, and 1.5% from two or more races. Hispanic or Latino of any race were 4.6% of the population.

There were 320 households, out of which 6.9% had children under the age of 18 living with them, 57.5% were married couples living together, 5.0% had a female householder with no husband present, and 35.3% were non-families. 30.3% of all households were made up of individuals, and 22.2% had someone living alone who was 65 years of age or older. The average household size was 1.92 and the average family size was 2.33.

In the CDP, the population was spread out, with 9.8% under the age of 18, 1.1% from 18 to 24, 8.5% from 25 to 44, 29.3% from 45 to 64, and 51.4% who were 65 years of age or older. The median age was 65 years. For every 100 females, there were 97.1 males. For every 100 females age 18 and over, there were 96.1 males.

The median income for a household in the CDP was $19,479, and the median income for a family was $27,935. Males had a median income of $36,250 versus $20,536 for females. The per capita income for the CDP was $13,623. About 9.9% of families and 21.0% of the population were below the poverty line, including 47.4% of those under age 18 and 12.3% of those age 65 or over.

== Climate ==
This area has a large amount of sunshine year-round due to its stable descending air and high pressure. According to the Köppen Climate Classification system, Bouse has a desert climate, abbreviated "BWh" on climate maps.

Climate data for Bouse, Arizona, 1991–2020 normals, extremes 1932–2017
Month	Jan	Feb	Mar	Apr	May	Jun	Jul	Aug	Sep	Oct	Nov	Dec	Year
Record high °F (°C)	88 (31)	92 (33)	98 (37)	106 (41)	115 (46)	121 (49)	123 (51)	118 (48)	117 (47)	109 (43)	96 (36)	92 (33)	123 (51)
Mean maximum °F (°C)	75.8 (24.3)	81.4 (27.4)	89.9 (32.2)	99.0 (37.2)	105.9 (41.1)	113.0 (45.0)	115.3 (46.3)	113.1 (45.1)	109.1 (42.8)	99.5 (37.5)	86.5 (30.3)	74.0 (23.3)	116.0 (46.7)
Mean daily maximum °F (°C)	65.9 (18.8)	70.3 (21.3)	78.4 (25.8)	86.4 (30.2)	95.3 (35.2)	104.9 (40.5)	108.4 (42.4)	107.3 (41.8)	100.8 (38.2)	88.6 (31.4)	74.9 (23.8)	64.1 (17.8)	87.1 (30.6)
Daily mean °F (°C)	51.5 (10.8)	55.5 (13.1)	62.2 (16.8)	69.3 (20.7)	78.2 (25.7)	87.1 (30.6)	93.3 (34.1)	92.4 (33.6)	84.9 (29.4)	72.0 (22.2)	58.9 (14.9)	50.0 (10.0)	71.3 (21.8)
Mean daily minimum °F (°C)	37.1 (2.8)	40.7 (4.8)	46.0 (7.8)	52.1 (11.2)	61.1 (16.2)	69.3 (20.7)	78.2 (25.7)	77.5 (25.3)	69.1 (20.6)	55.4 (13.0)	42.9 (6.1)	36.0 (2.2)	55.5 (13.0)
Mean minimum °F (°C)	25.4 (−3.7)	28.8 (−1.8)	33.0 (0.6)	39.8 (4.3)	47.4 (8.6)	56.9 (13.8)	66.5 (19.2)	66.3 (19.1)	55.1 (12.8)	42.4 (5.8)	30.1 (−1.1)	23.8 (−4.6)	22.1 (−5.5)
Record low °F (°C)	11 (−12)	16 (−9)	20 (−7)	27 (−3)	35 (2)	42 (6)	57 (14)	48 (9)	40 (4)	24 (−4)	19 (−7)	15 (−9)	11 (−12)
Average precipitation inches (mm)	0.66 (17)	0.80 (20)	0.51 (13)	0.19 (4.8)	0.31 (7.9)	0.04 (1.0)	0.48 (12)	0.73 (19)	0.77 (20)	0.38 (9.7)	0.34 (8.6)	0.64 (16)	5.85 (149)
Average precipitation days (≥ 0.01 in)	3.1	4.0	2.8	1.0	0.7	0.3	2.9	3.5	2.4	1.8	1.5	2.9	26.9
Source 1: NOAA
Source 2: XMACIS2 (mean maxima/minima 1981–2010)

== Government ==
The Bouse Domestic Water Improvement District provides water service to Bouse. Education is provided by the Bouse Elementary School District and the Bicentennial Union High School District.

== Economy ==
A chicken egg facility owned by Rose Acre Farms, the Lone Cactus Farm, broke ground near Bouse in July 2015 and opened the following year. According to the president of the La Paz Economic Development Corporation, it is the biggest economic development project ever taken in the county. A rail spur off the Arizona and California Railroad and a grain terminal serving the farm opened in December 2018. Another egg facility broke ground near Lone Cactus Farm in May 2023.

== See also ==
- List of census-designated places in Arizona
- List of historic properties in Bouse, Arizona
