= List of historic properties in Quartzsite, Arizona =

- Town
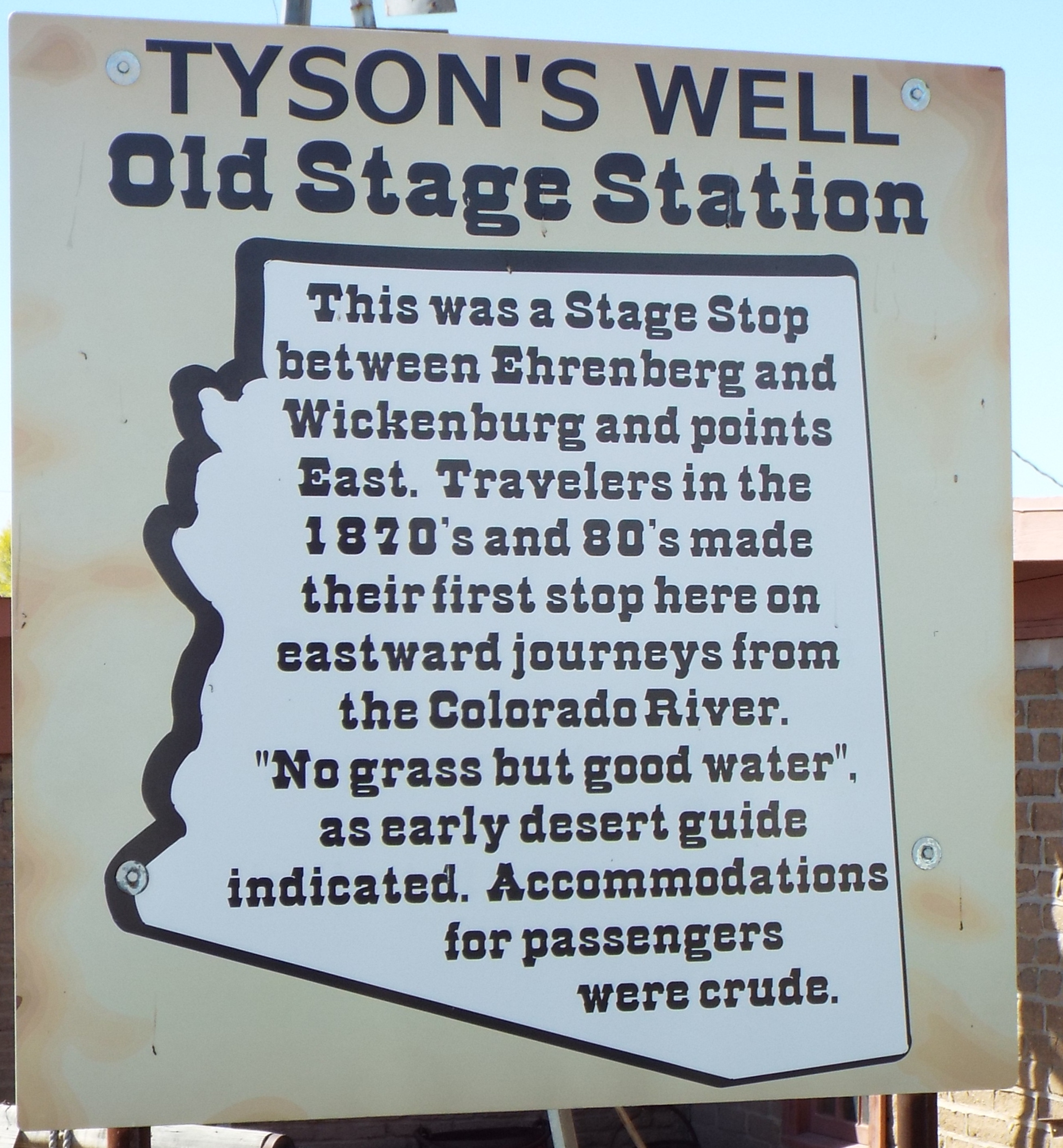
- Tyson's Well Old Stage Station Marker

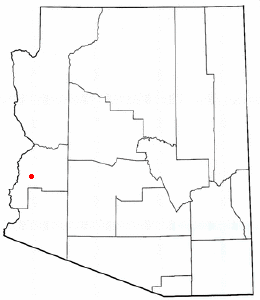
- Location of Quartzsite in La Paz County, Arizona.

This is a list, which includes a photographic gallery, of some of the remaining structures and monuments, of historic significance in Quartzsite, a town in La Paz County, Arizona.

== Brief history ==
=== Fort Tyson ===
Quartzsite got its name from the quartz that was found in the area. The town was established on what used to be Fort Tyson, which was once used for protection against Indian raids.

In the early years of the American gold rush, pan handlers began to arrive in Arizona searching for the precious metal. Gold deposits was discovered in the desert mountains of Plomosa and Dome Rock in the area and a boom in the mining industry followed. Charles Tyson was a miner who foresaw the mining potential of the area.

The Yavapai tribe (a.k.a. as Mohave-Apache) resented the arrival of the Anglo-European settlers, who arrived from California and other places in the United States, on their land and raided the early settlements. The water supply in the area became the main target of their raids. In 1856 Tyson built a Fort to protect the settlers and the settlement became known as Fort Tyson.

According to the Quartzsite Historical Society, in 1864, Tyson dug a well by hand. The well served the stage coaches that traveled from the towns of Ehrenberg and Prescott. Tyson's Well Stage Station became a busy stage coach station since it was located on the Butterfield Overland Mail route between Prescott, Arizona and Riverside, California.

In 1897, the town was officially named Quartzsite. Tyson owned three store, two saloons and a post office. The establishment of the railroad affected the commercial aspect of the area since most people preferred to travel by train. However, Tyson's Well stage station continued to provide rest and refreshment to travelers and freight drivers.

=== Hi Jolly Cemetery ===
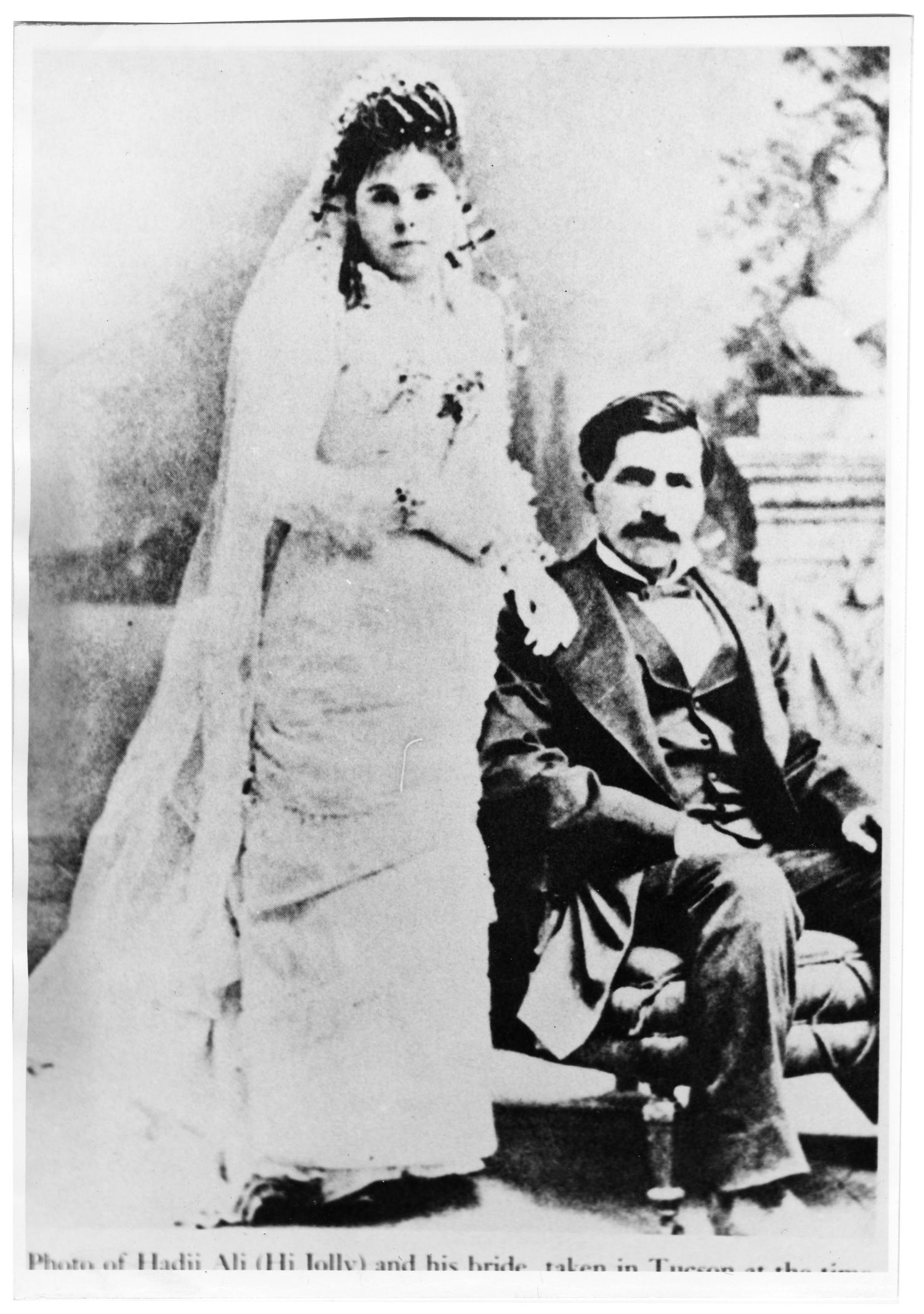
Gertrudis Serna & Hadji Ali

Hadji Ali (1828–1902), a.k.a. "Hi Jolly" and "Philip Tedro", was an Ottoman subject of Syrian and Greek parentage, who was among the men hired by the United States Army to introduce camels as beasts of burden to transport cargo across the "Great American Desert." Ali was the lead camel driver during the US Army's experiment with the U.S. Camel Corps. The cost of the American Civil War resulted in that the Congress did no longer approve more funds for the Corps. The camels were auctioned in 1884 in Benicia, California. Ali was discharged from the Quartermaster Department of the U.S. Army at Camp McDowell in 1870.

Ali hired by the U.S. Army in Arizona in 1885, under the command of General George Crook during the Geronimo campaign where he was in charge of packing mules. Later Ali moved and to Quartzsite, Arizona with his wife Gertrudis Serna and family. During his years as a resident of Quartzsite, he did some mining in the local mines and on occasion served as a scout for the US government. He died in 1902 and was buried in the Quartzsite Cemetery which was renamed the "Hi Jolly Cemetery" in 1903, in honor of Hadji Ali. The cemetery is located in the intersection of West Elsie and Hi Jolly Lanes.

== Quartzsite Historical Society ==
The Quartzsite Museum is managed by the Quartzsite Historical Society. The museum Located in Tyson's Wells Stage Station, which was built in 1866–67, at 161 W Main Street. It provides an introduction to pioneer and mining history of Quartzsite.

== Properties pictured ==
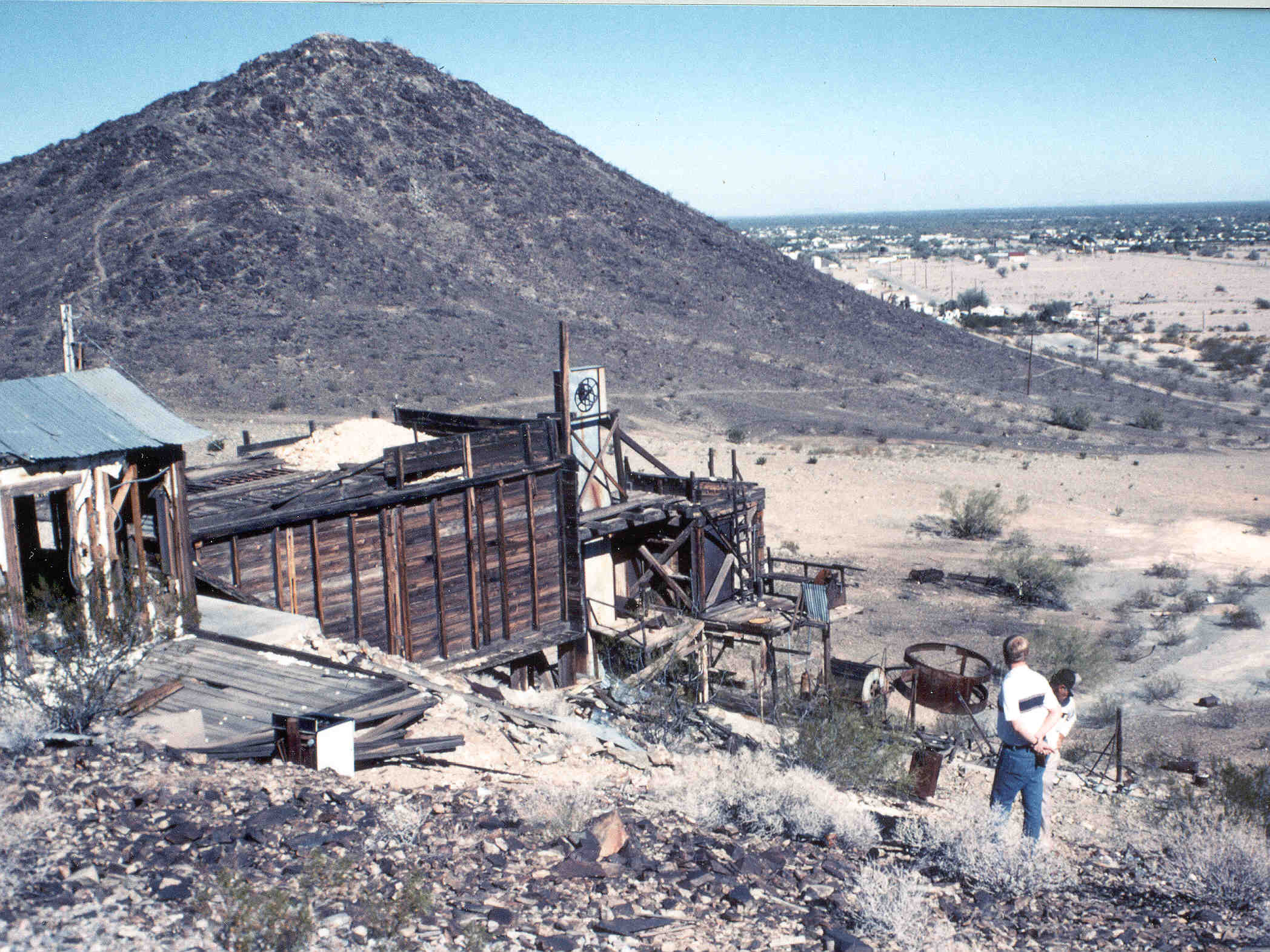
Abandoned mine near Quartzsite

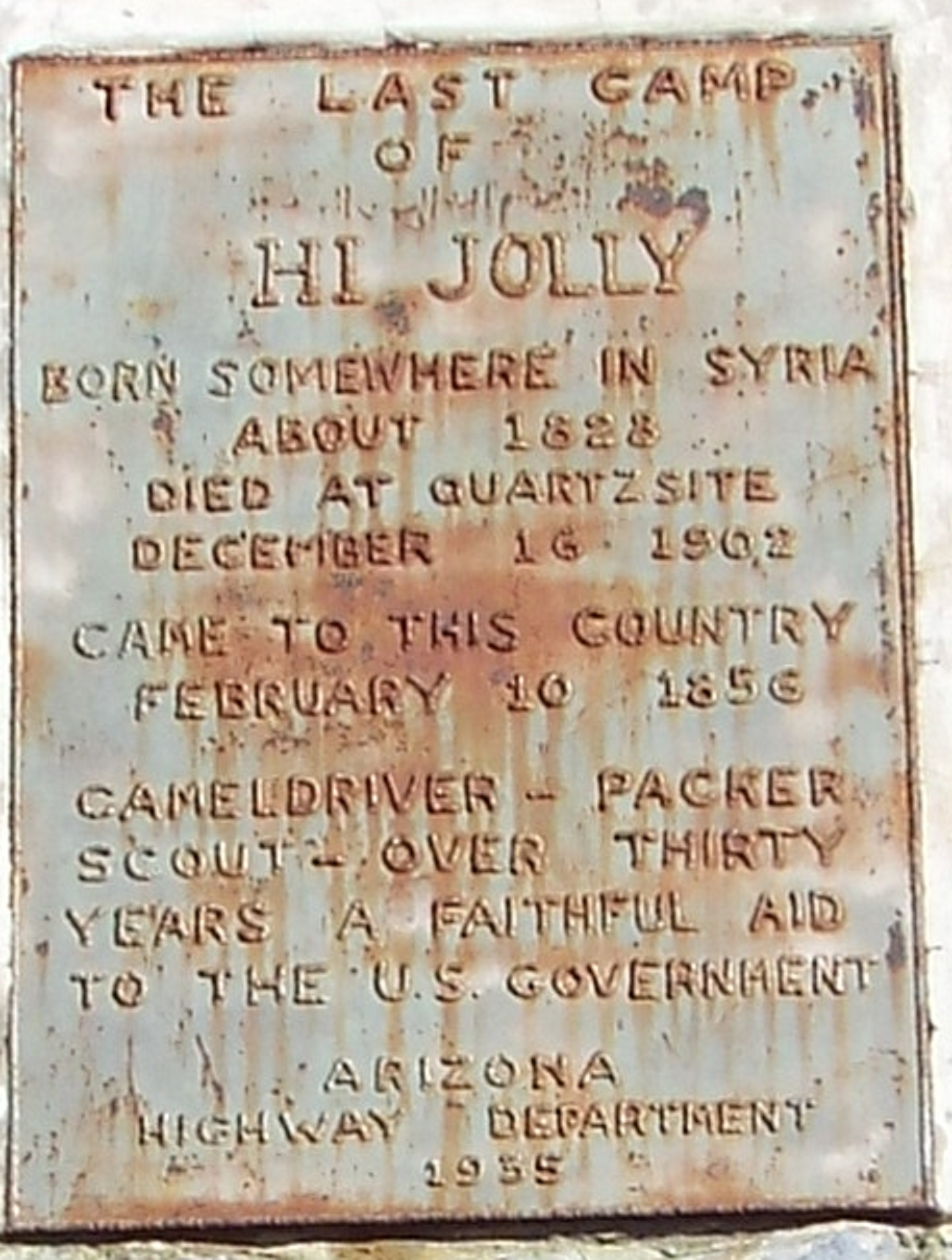
Plaque on the Hi Jolly Monument

The following is a brief description of the historic properties that are pictured:

- The Ruins of Fort Tyson – ruins of the fort which was built in 1856 and is located on the corner of Main St. and Moon Mountain Road.
- Tyson's Well – The site where in 1864 Charles Tyson dug what is known as Tyson's Well.
- Tyson's Well Stage Station – The station was built in 1866 and is located in 161 West Main Street. The stage station served the travelers who went back and forth from the towns of Ehrenberg and Wickenburg. The building now houses the Quartzsite Museum and Historical Society.
- The Watering Well – The well is on the grounds of Tyson's Stage Station.
- The Oasis Hotel – The restored Oasis Hotel which was originally built in 1900 and located on Main Street.
- The Quartzsite Cemetery – The cemetery was established in 1890, and renamed the Hi Jolly Cemetery in 1903 in honor of Hadji Ali a.k.a. Hi Jolly. The cemetery is located in the intersection of West Elsie and Hi Jolly Lanes.
- The Grave of Hadji Ali – The grave of Ali (1828–1902) a.k.a. Hi Jolly is located in the Hi Jolly Cemetery. The "Hi Jolly Monument" was built over his grave in 1903 It was listed in the National Register of Historic Places on February 28, 2011, reference #11000054.
- The Quartzsite Post Office – The abandoned Post Office was built in 1910 on Main Street. The building once housed the "Camel Shop" before it was a Post Office
- The Camel Stop Gas Station – The abandoned station was built in 1940 and is located on Main Street.
- A Farm Windmill and Water Tank – Both structures are abandoned and located on Main Street.

== Historic properties and structures in Quartzsite ==
Historic structures in Quartzsite

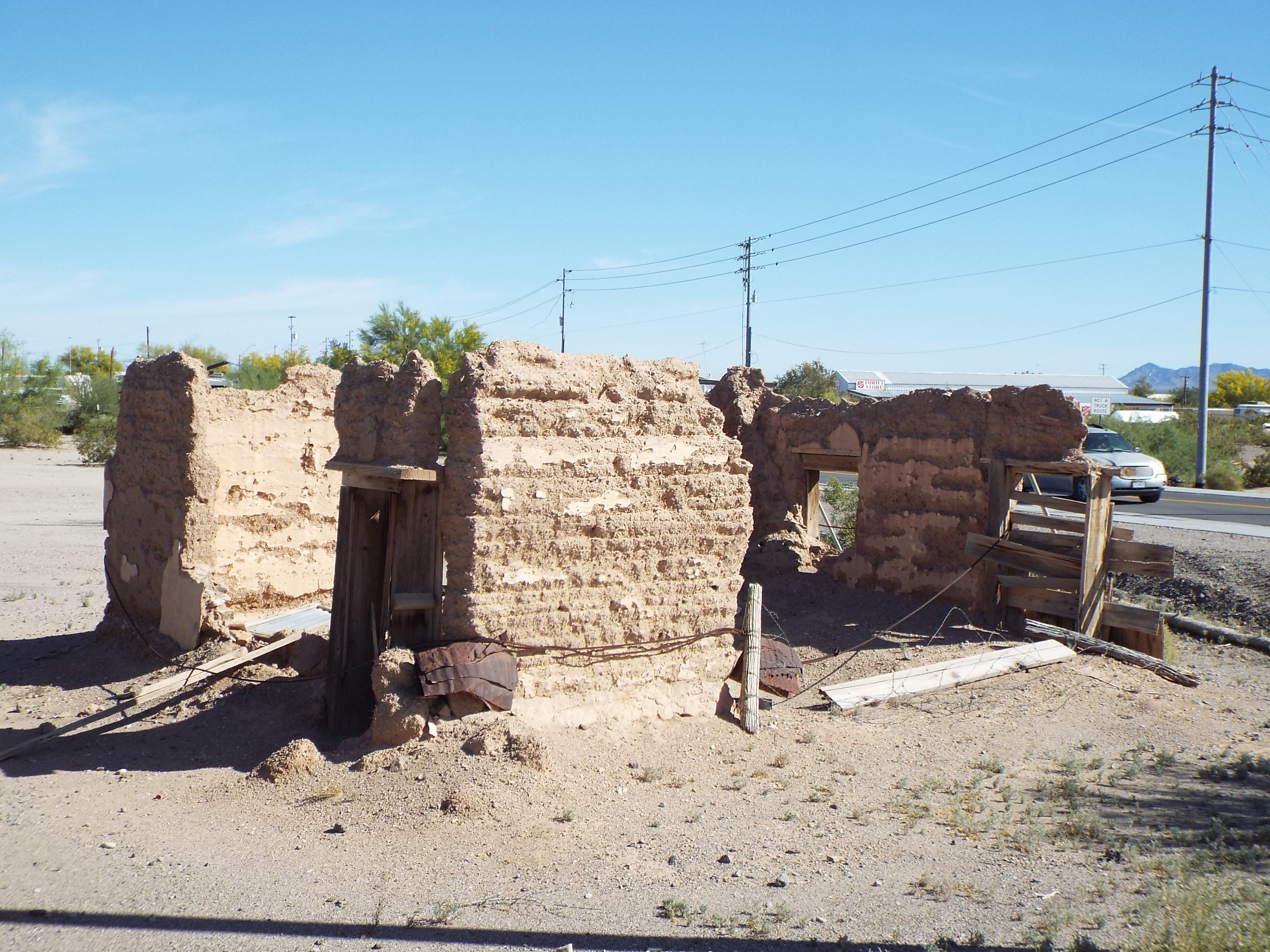
Fort Tyson Ruin

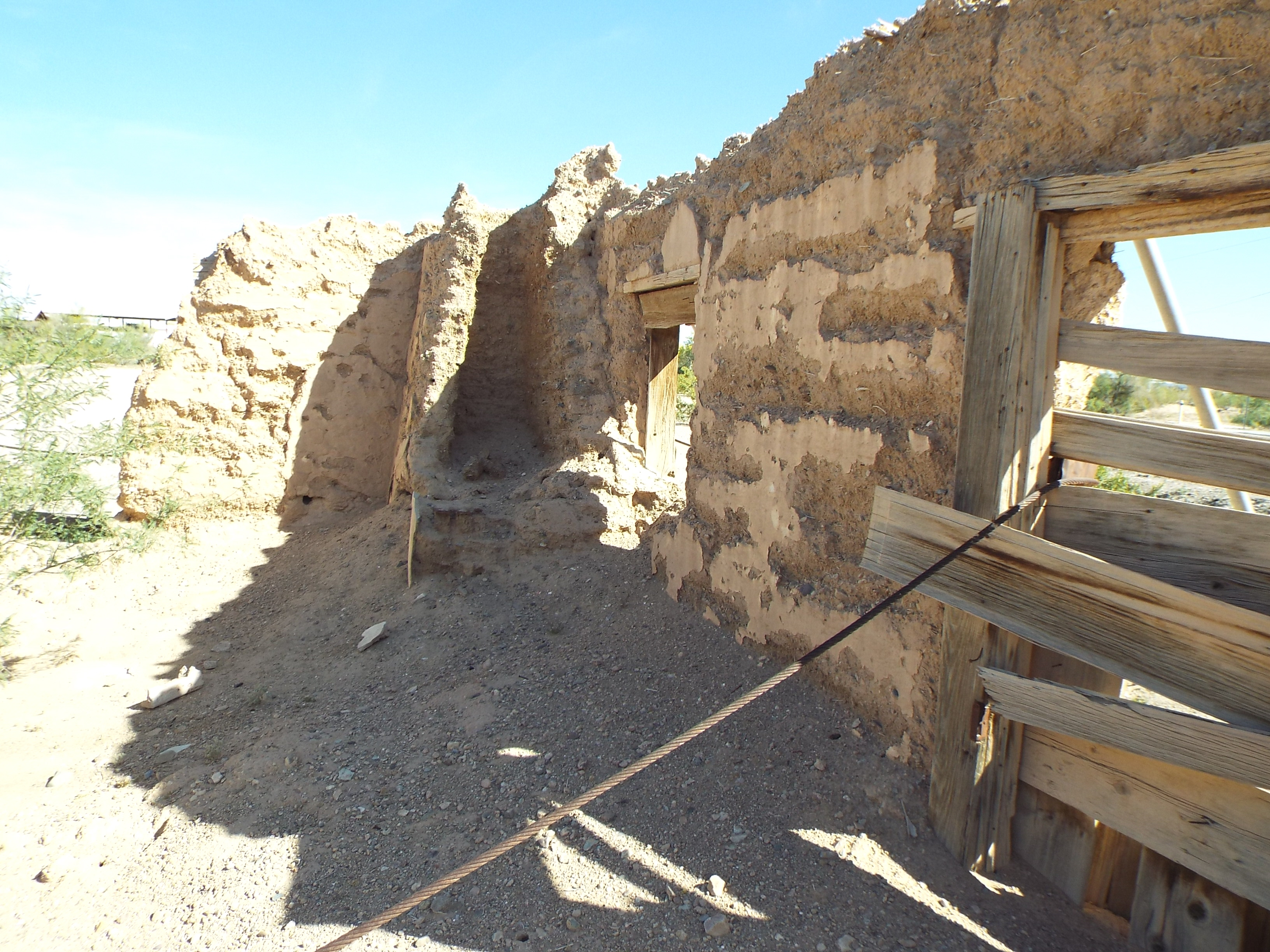
Fort Tyson Ruins (1856)

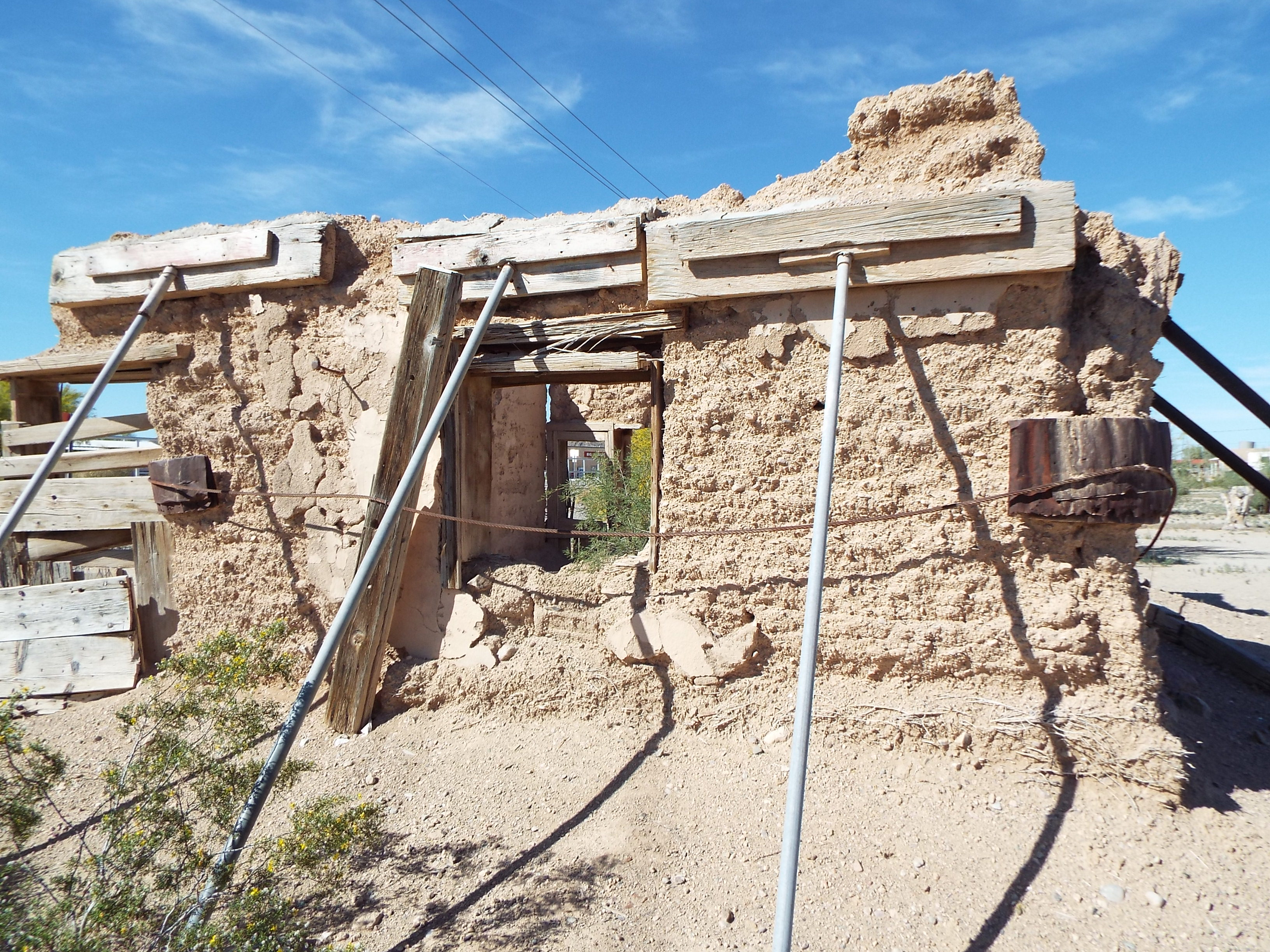
Fort Tyson Ruins (1856)

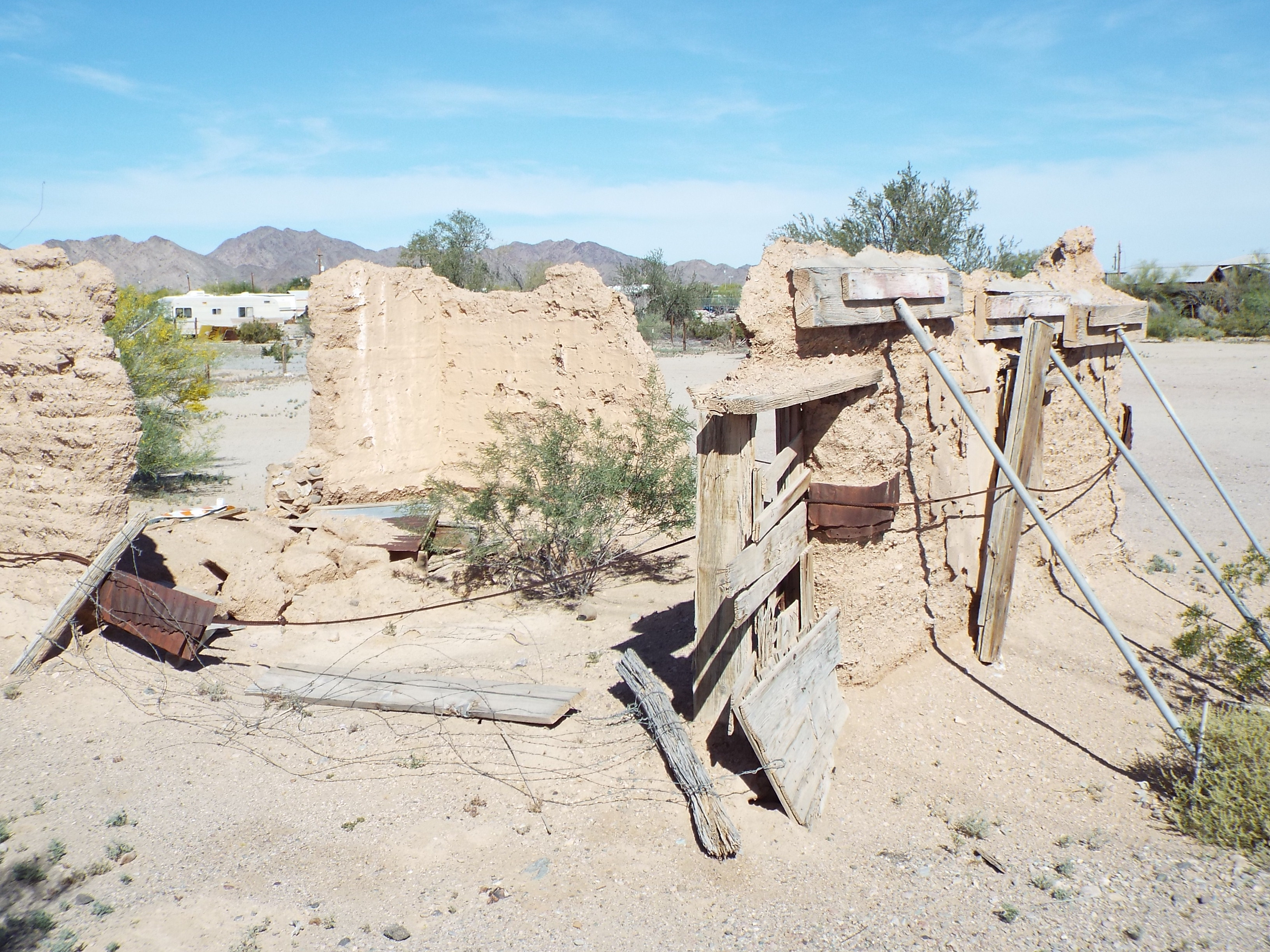
Fort Tyson Ruins (1856)

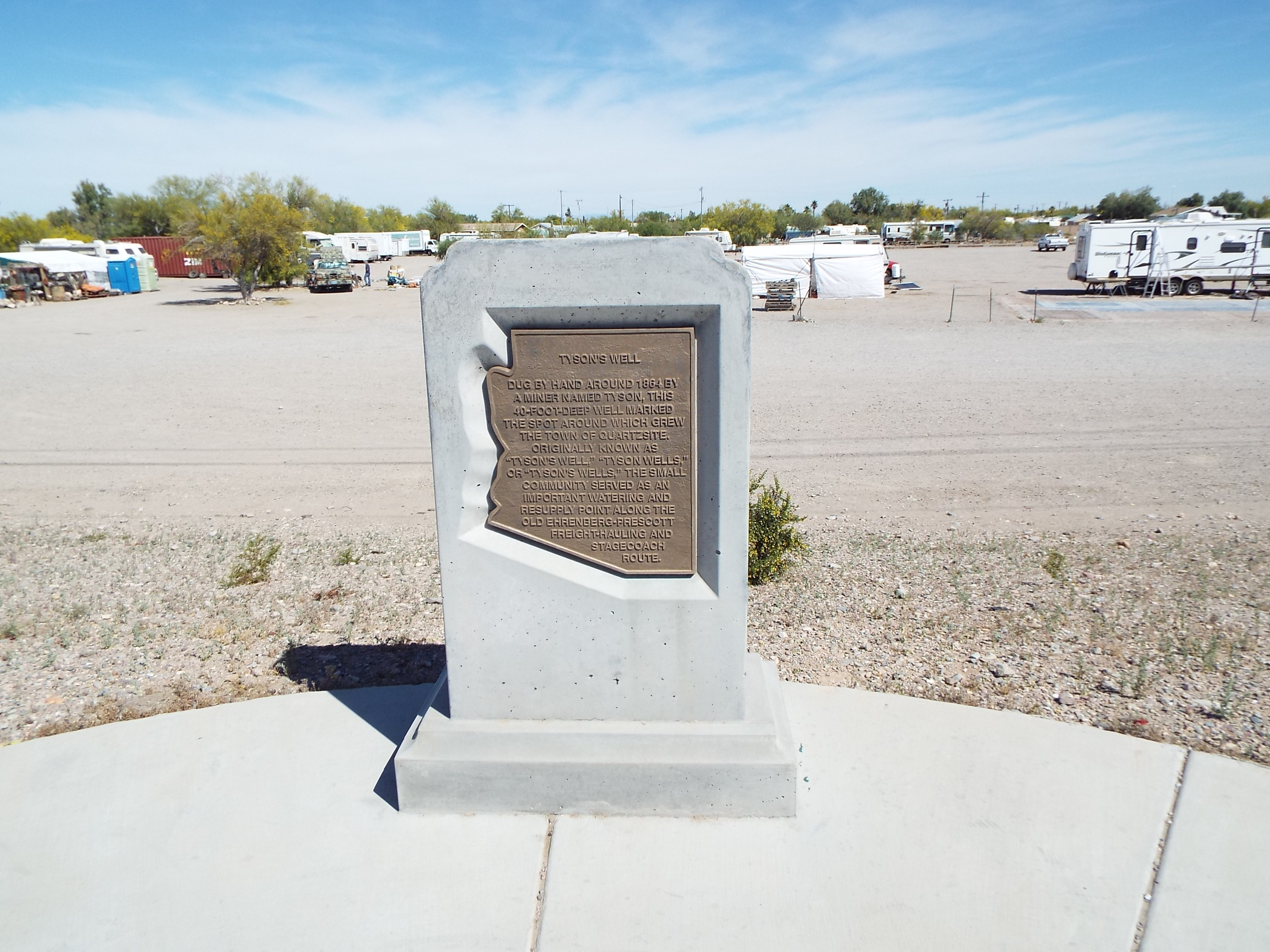
Tyson's Well (1864)

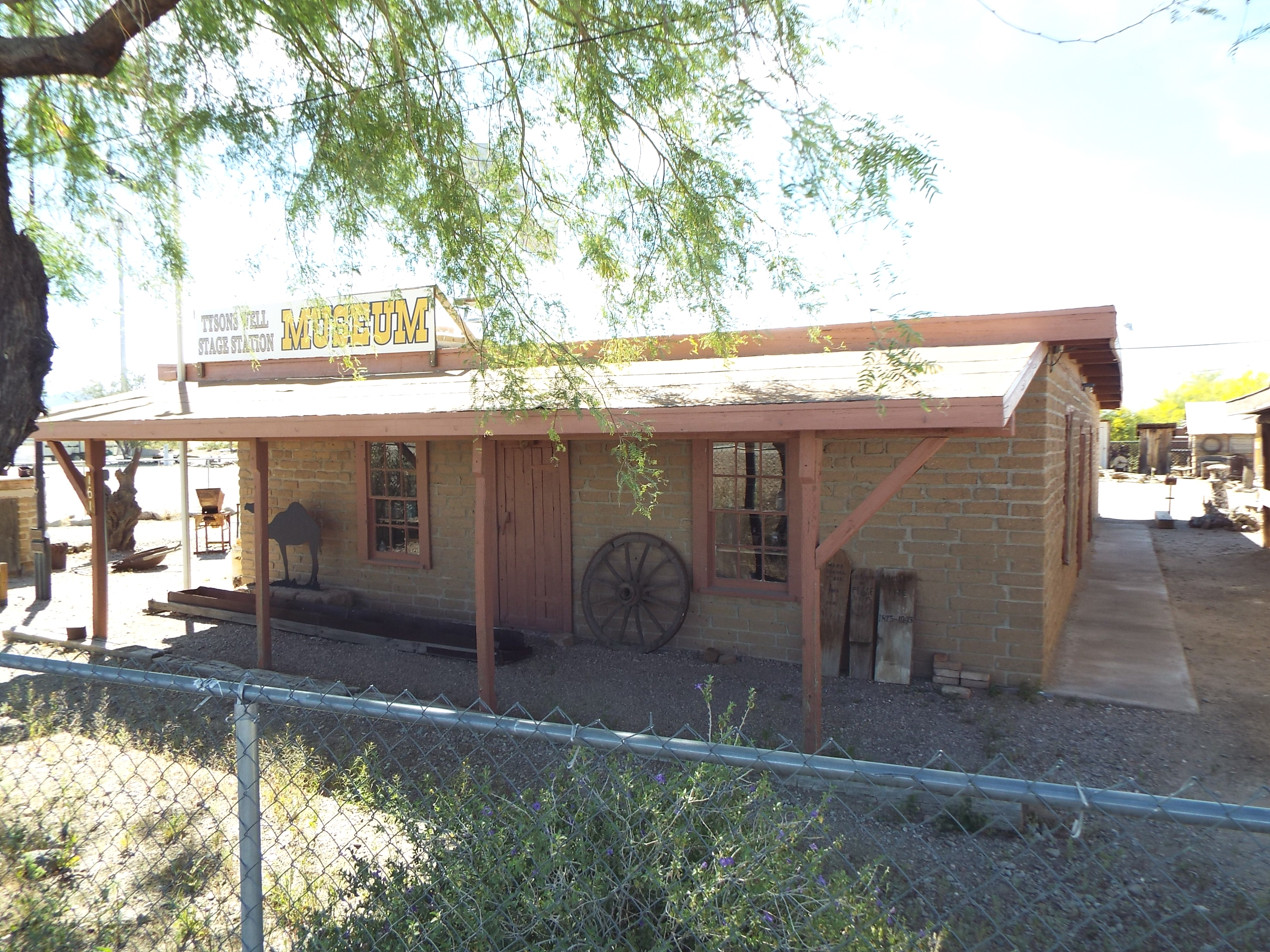
Tyson's Well Stage Station (1866)

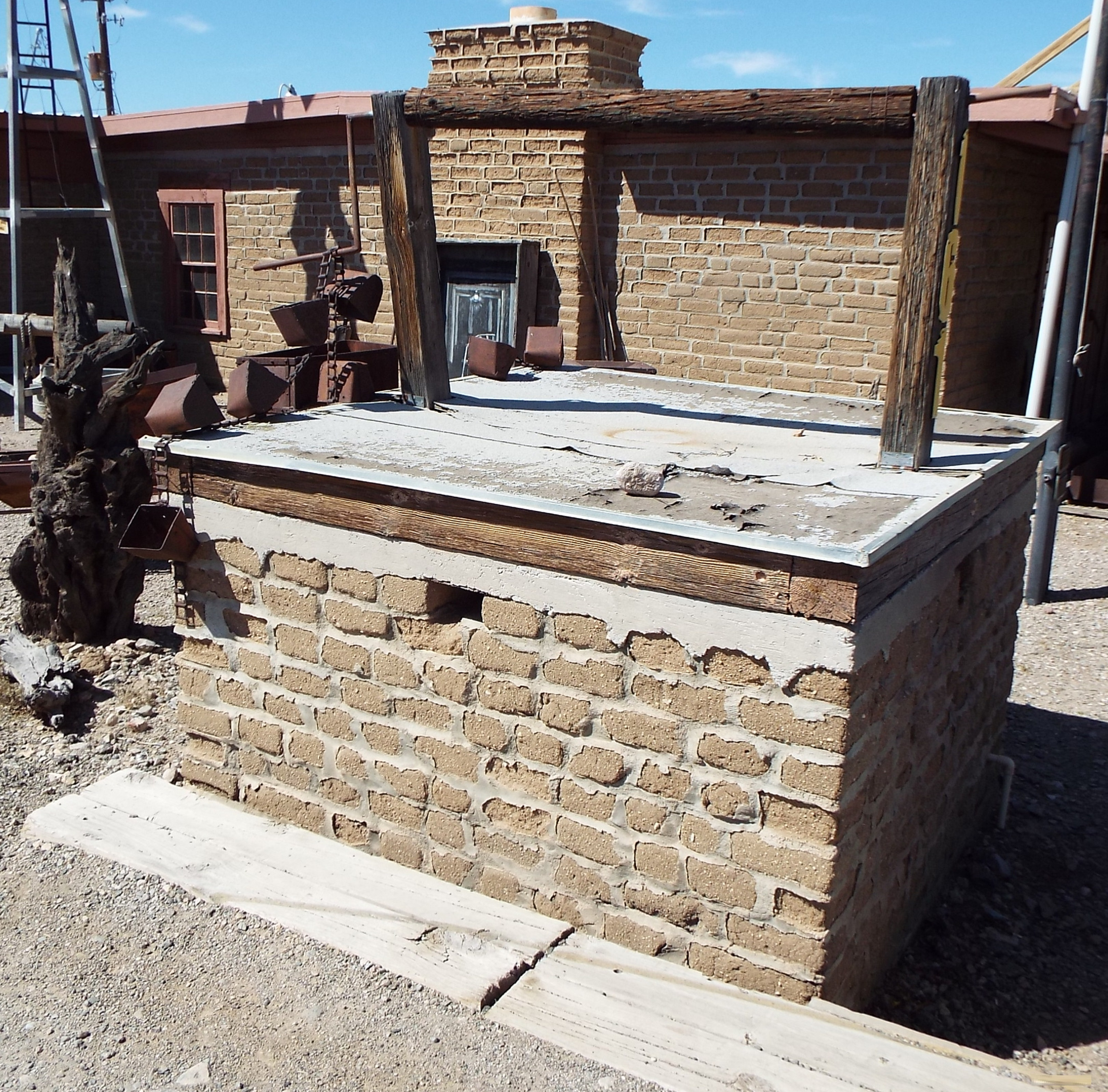
Watering well in Tyson's Stage Station (1866)

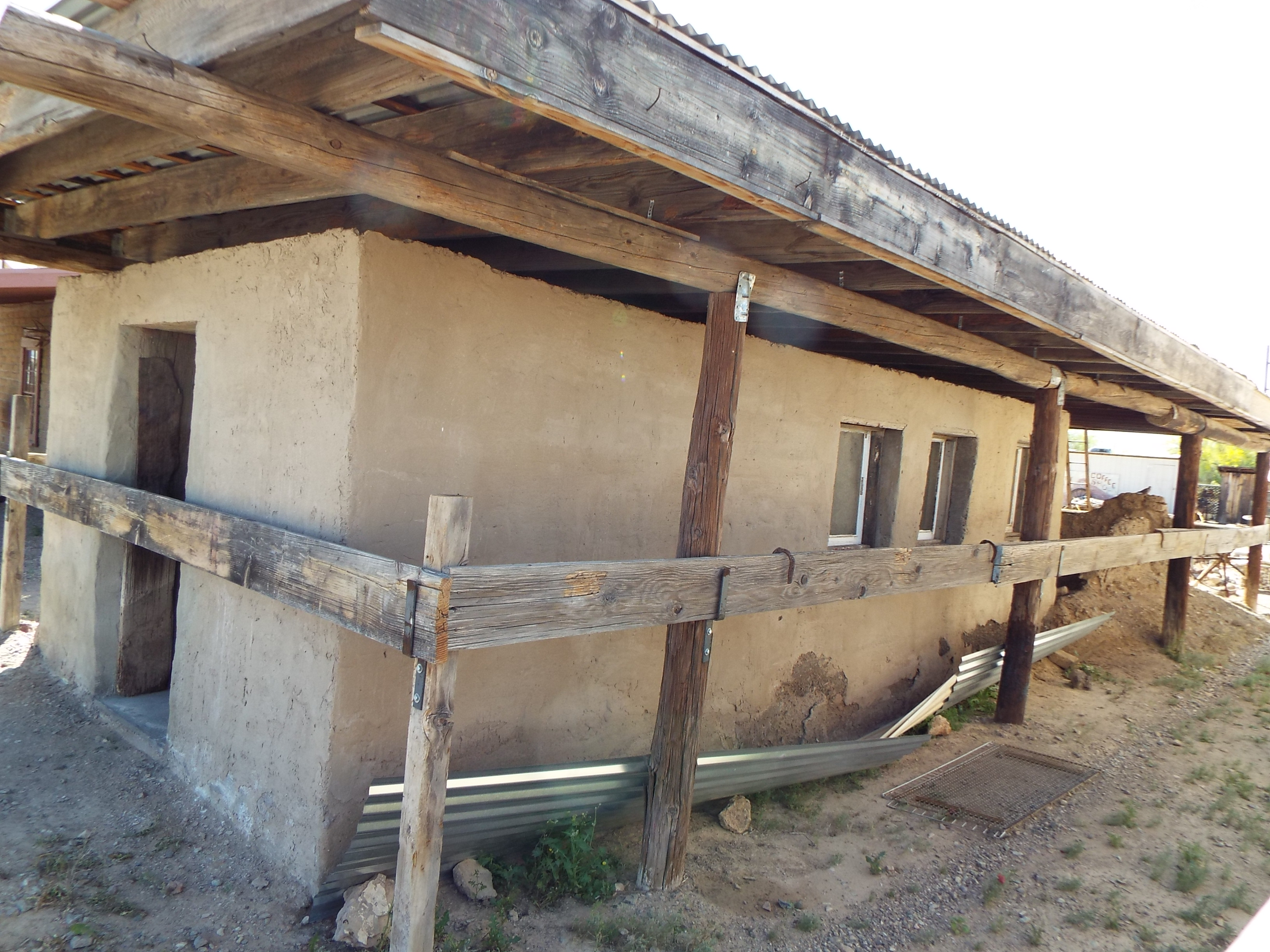
Oasis Hotel replica (1900)

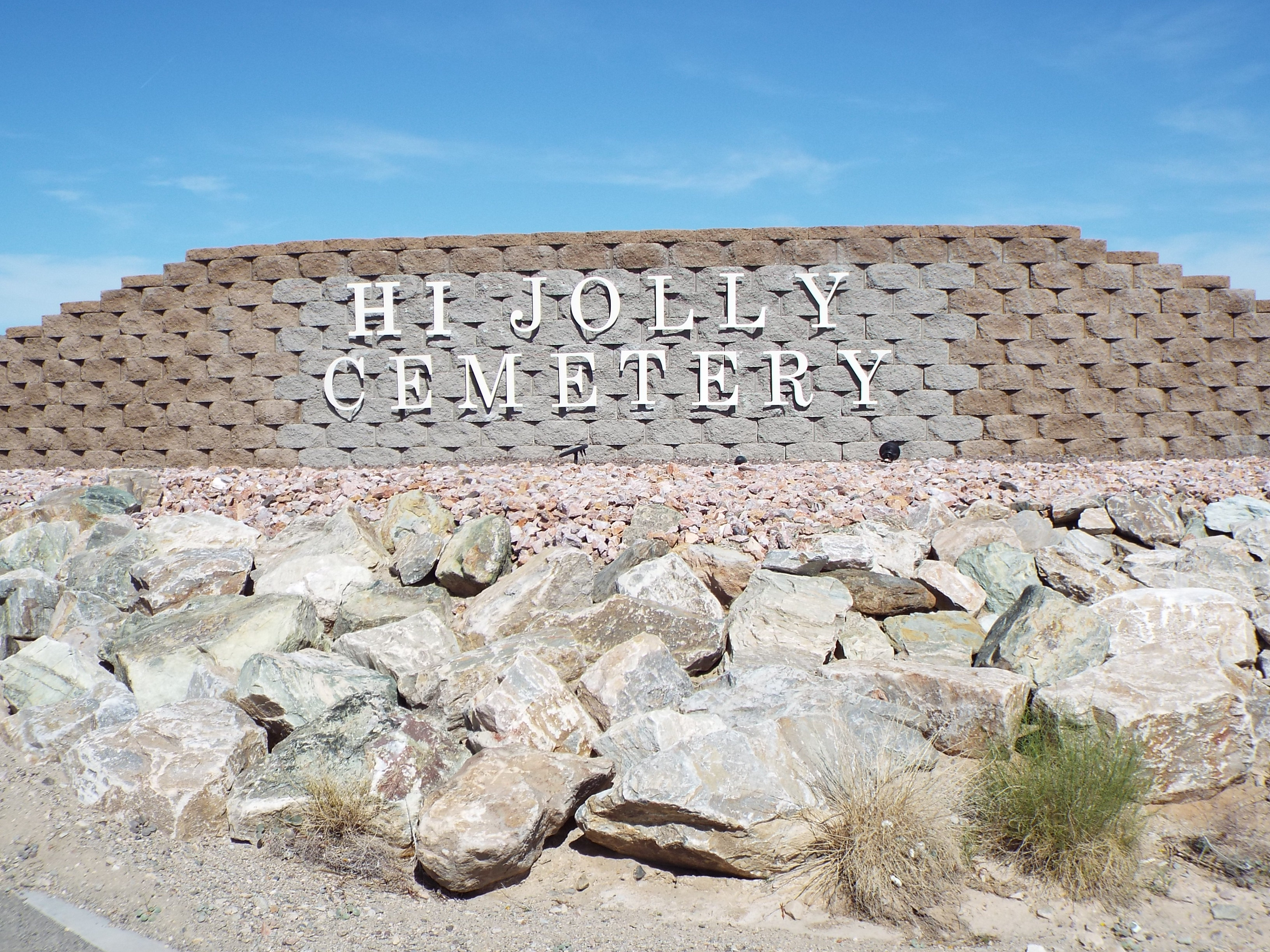
Hi Jolly Cemetery (1890)

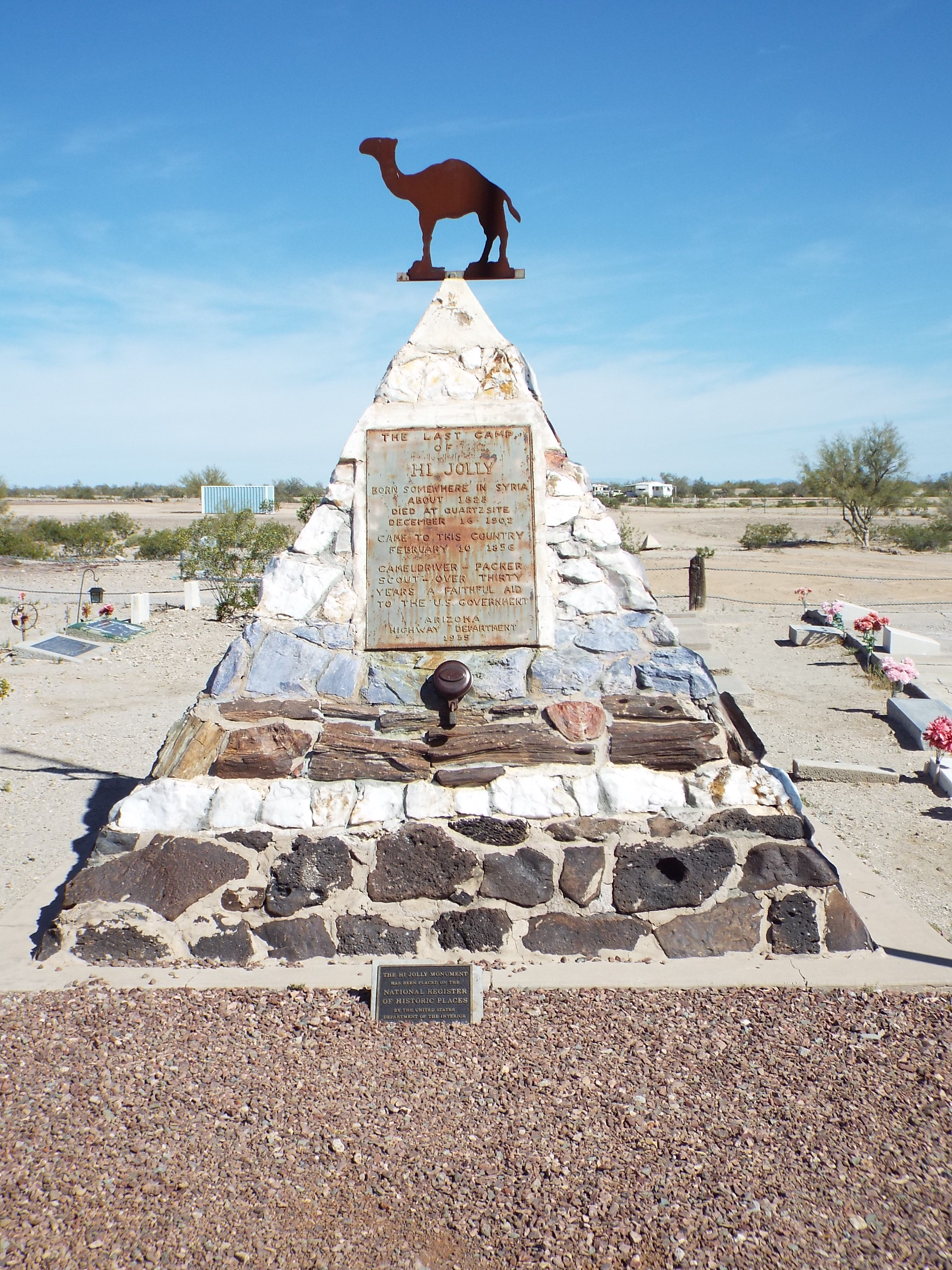
Hi Jolly Monument (1903) and grave site of Hadji Ali

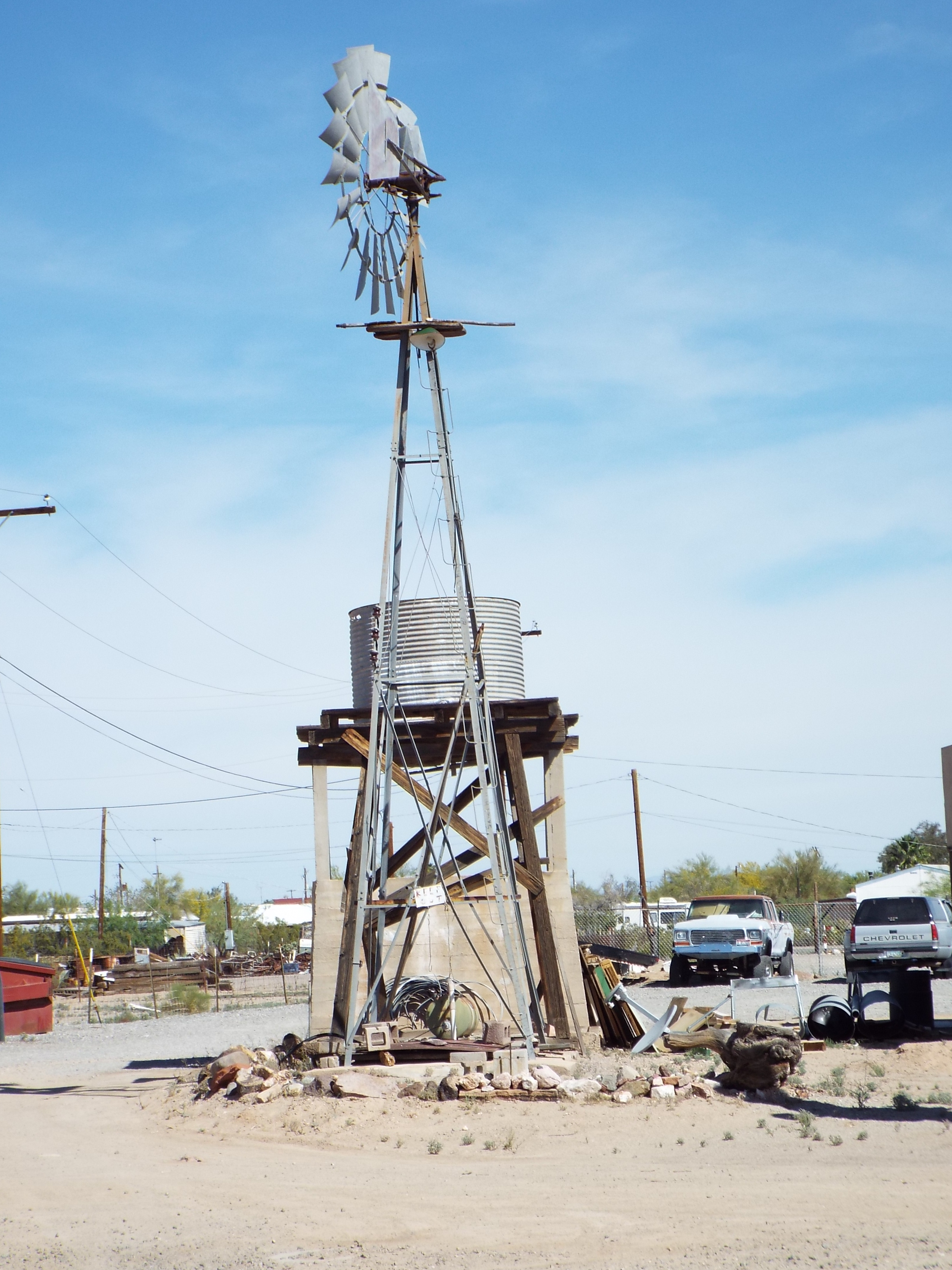
Windmill and water tank(1910)

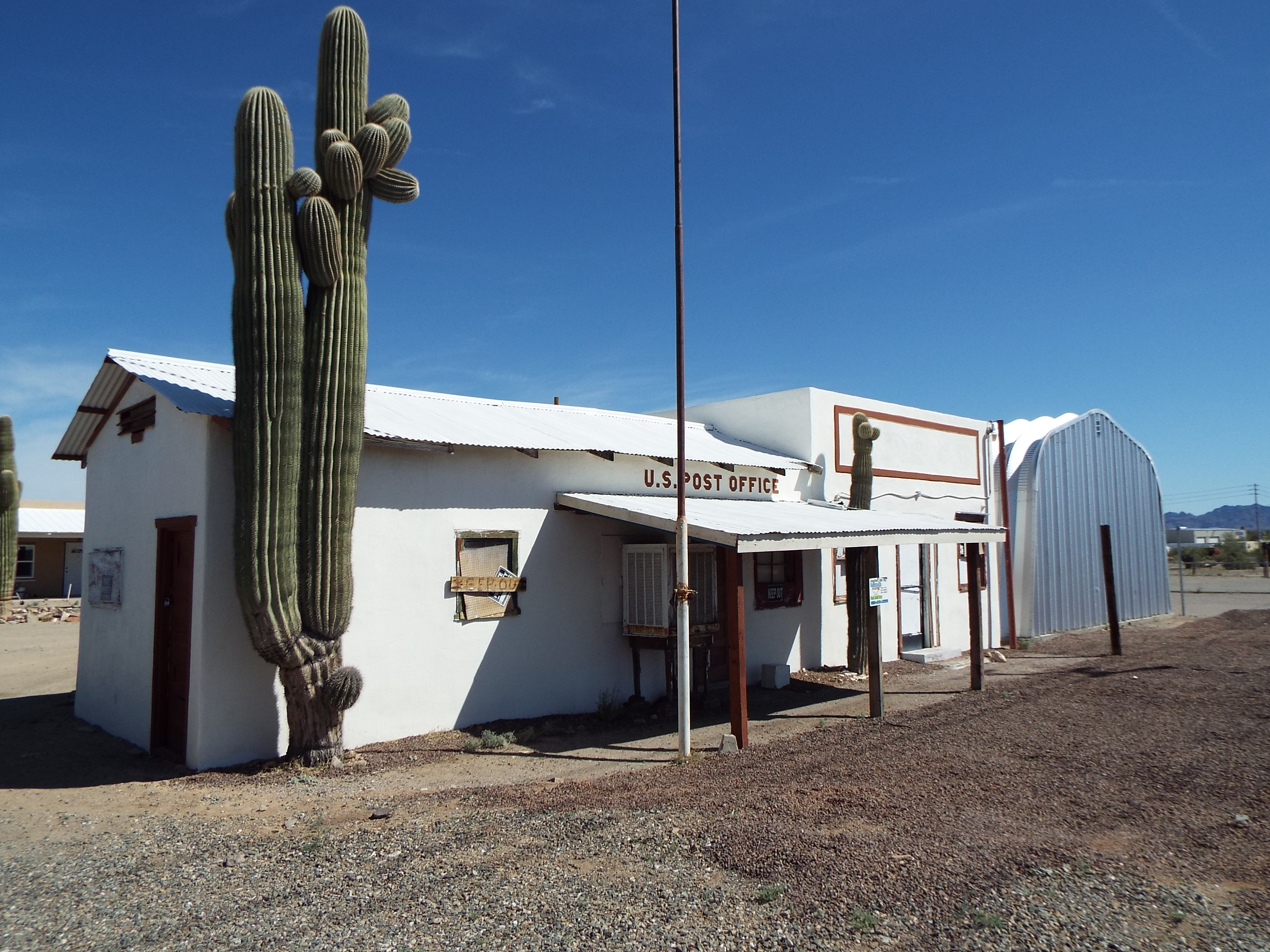
Quartzsite Post Office (1910)

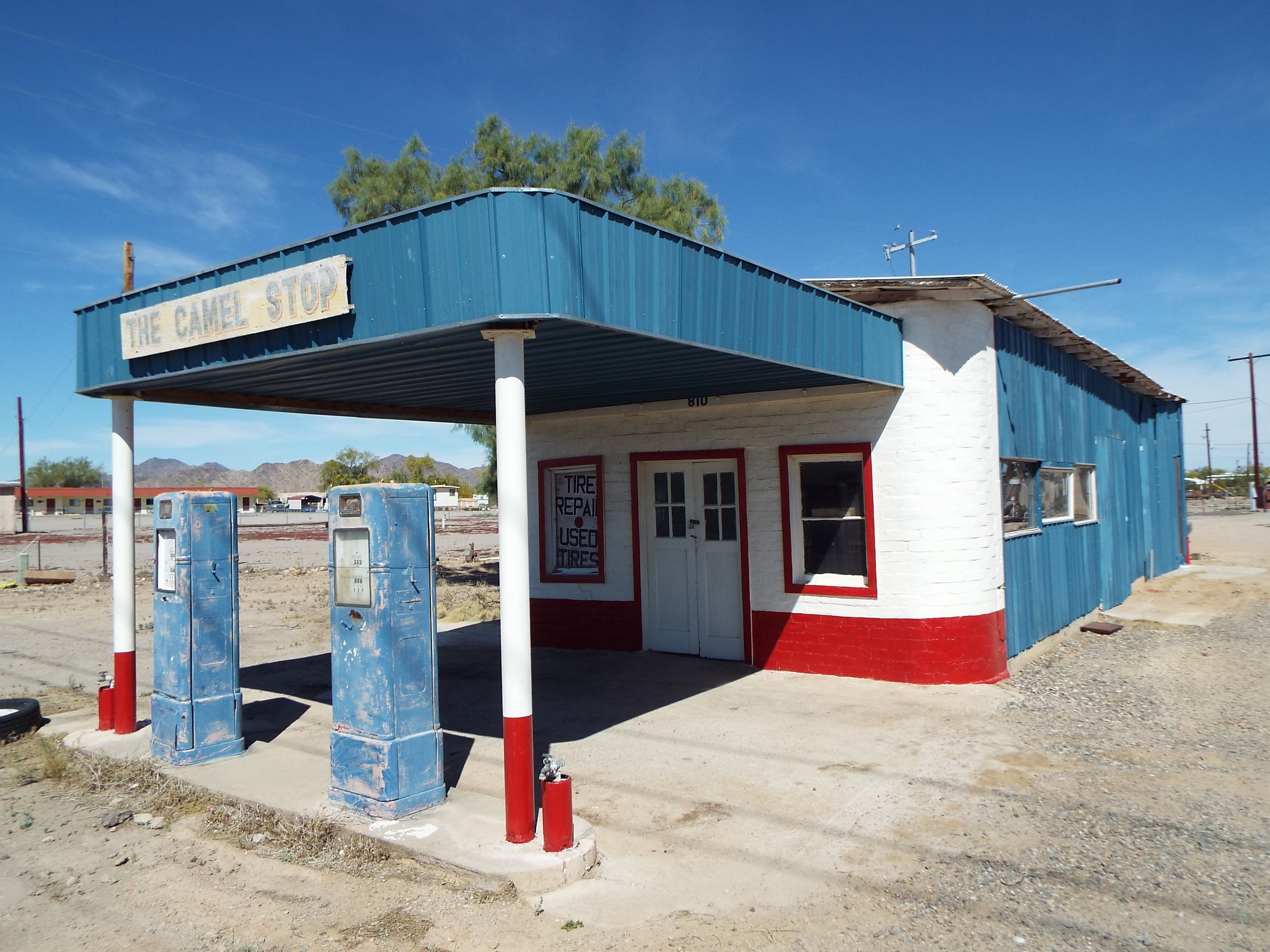
Camel Stop Gas Station (1940)

== See also ==
- Quartzsite, Arizona
- National Register of Historic Places listings in La Paz County, Arizona
