= Hi Jolly Monument =

Burial monument in Quartzsite, Arizona, U.S.

- U.S. National Register of Historic Places
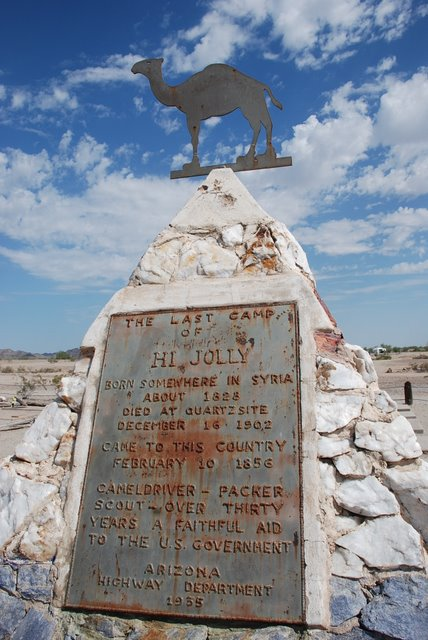
- The monument in 2008. The mention of "Syria" on the grave refers to the region of Ottoman Syria.

- Location within Arizona Location within the United States
- Location: 245 Kofa Ave., Quartzsite, Arizona
- Coordinates: 33°39′52.4″N 114°14′10.8″W
- Area: 0.1 acres (0.040 ha)
- Built: 1935
- NRHP reference No.: 11000054
- Added to NRHP: February 28, 2011

The Hi Jolly Monument is a grave site in the Hi Jolly Cemetery located at Quartzsite, Arizona, United States, marking the grave of Hi Jolly, a Syrian-born camel driver brought to the United States in 1856 to drive camels for the US Cavalry. The site is located halfway between Phoenix, Arizona, and Los Angeles, California. It was added to the National Register of Historic Places in 2011.

== Hi Jolly ==
Hi Jolly was born in Syria in 1828 as Philip Tedro, an Ottoman subject of Syrian and Greek parentage. Upon converting to Islam and making a pilgrimage to Mecca, he became known as Hadji Ali (later Americanized to Hi Jolly). He migrated to the United States in 1856 after being recruited in Smyrna, Turkey by the US Army as a camel driver/tender. At the time, the United States Secretary of War Jefferson Davis wanted to try using camel transport to move people and freight over western deserts.

Under the command of Lt. Edward Fitzgerald Beale, the United States Camel Corps was initially a success. In June 1857, Hi Jolly was lead camel driver for a round trip between Texas and California. By 1859, however, only Hi Jolly and "Greek George" remained of the ten camel drivers originally hired. After the camel experiment ended, Hi Jolly remained in the southwest, where he became a prospector, desert guide, mail courier, and freight hauler.

== Death and monument ==
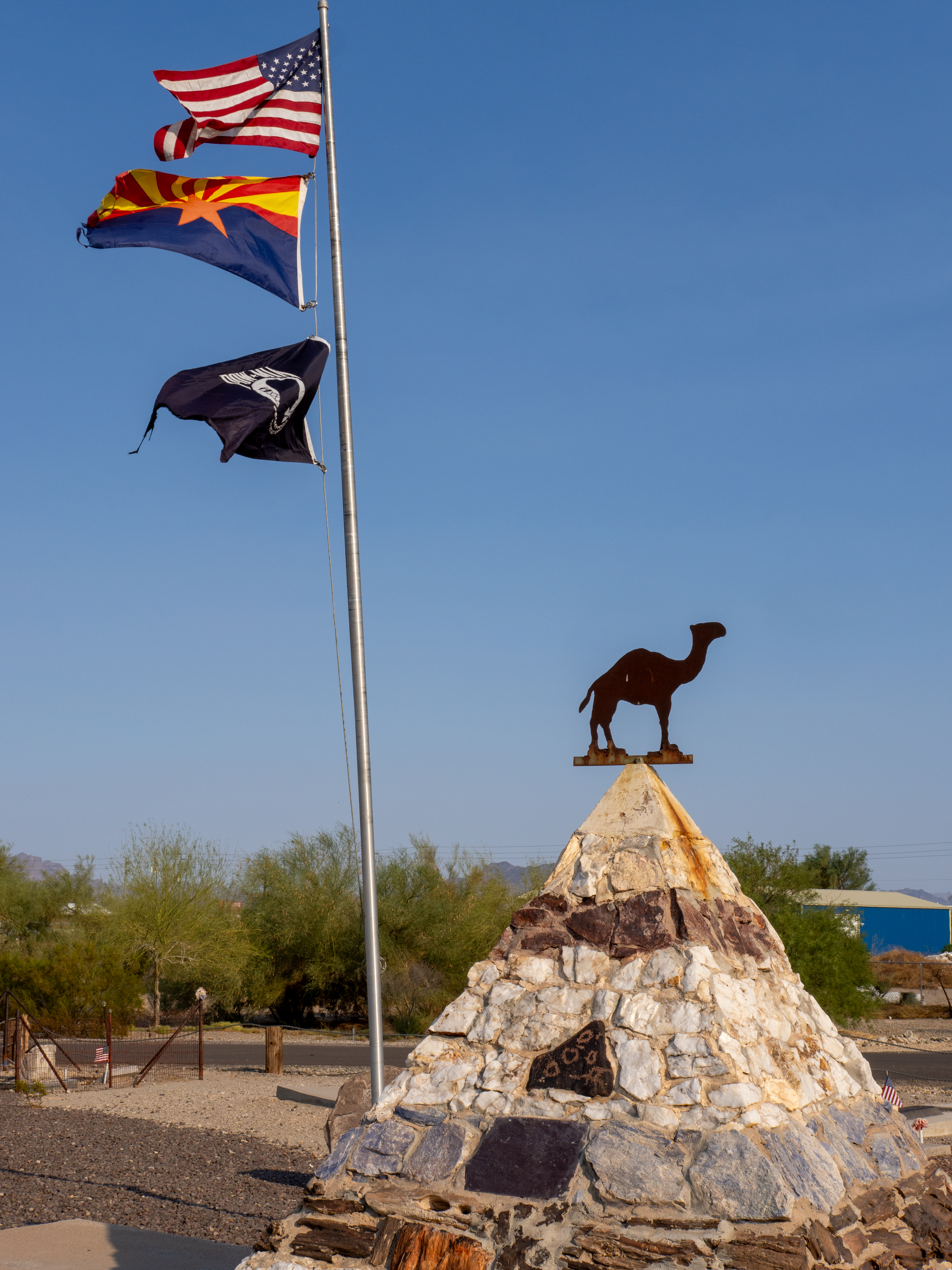
The Hi Jolly Monument in July 2025, with flags of the United States and Arizona, and the POW/MIA flag—as seen from behind.

Hi Jolly died in December 1902 in Quartzsite, Arizona and was buried there, the first grave in what became Hi Jolly Cemetery. Due to his popularity with the local citizens, they spent weeks building a pyramid monument over his grave made from multi-colored petrified wood and quartz. The cairn was dedicated on January 4, 1903.

In 1934, the Arizona Highway Department added a plaque with a synopsis of Hi Jolly's life and the metal silhouette of a camel. They also added a vault at the monument's base, in which they placed some memorabilia from Hi Jolly's life and the ashes of a camel named "Old Topsy", the last camel survivor of the experiment.

The plaque was dedicated in 1935 by Arizona governor Benjamin Moeur. The monument was added to the National Register of Historic Places in 2011.

The pyramid measures 9 feet (2.7 m) at the base on each side and is 8 feet (2.4 m) tall. The camel silhouette on the apex is made of steel, 2 feet (0.61 m) tall, and faces west. It is located in the older "pioneer section" of the cemetery, marking the first of 124 graves in the section. The cemetery is in a natural desert setting with hard packed dirt, one block off the main street (U.S. Route 95) in Quartzsite.

The plaque on the monument reads:

THE LAST CAMP

OF
HI JOLLY
BORN SOMEWHERE IN SYRIA
ABOUT 1828
DIED AT QUARTZSITE
DECEMBER 16, 1902
CAME TO THIS COUNTRY
FEBRUARY 10, 1856
CAMELDRIVER – PACKER
SCOUT – OVER THIRTY
YEARS A FAITHFUL AID
TO THE U.S. GOVERNMENT
ARIZONA
HIGHWAY DEPARTMENT
1935
