= One Road to Quartzsite =

One Road to Quartzsite is a 2022 documentary film which follows the annual winter migration of a varying group of people including "snowbirds", crustpunks, retirees, and nomads who to the small desert town of Quartzsite, Arizona. It was directed by Ryan Maxey.
