= Desert Wells, Arizona =

Populated place

Coordinates: 33°42′30″N 113°49′18″W

Desert Wells, originally Desert Station, a stagecoach station on the La Paz–Wickenburg Road in the 1870s, is a populated place in La Paz County, Arizona, United States. It lies at an elevation of 1,132 feet / 345 meters and is located 4.7 miles west-southwest of Vicksburg on U.S. Route 60.

== History ==
Desert Wells was originally known as Desert Station, a stagecoach station on the La Paz–Wickenburg Road, in what was then Yuma County. It lay 26 miles from Tyson's Wells to the west and 20 miles from Flint's on Centennial Wash to the east. In 1875, it was seen by Martha Summerhayes, and later described in her book Vanished Arizona:

At night we arrived at Desert Station. There was a good ranch there, kept by Hunt and Dudley, Englishmen, I believe. I did not see them, but I wondered who they were and why they staid in such a place. They were absent at the time; perhaps they had mines or something of the sort to look after. One is always imagining things about people who live in such extraordinary places. At all events, whatever Messrs. Hunt and Dudley were doing down there, their ranch was clean and attractive, which was more than could be said of the place where we stopped the next night, a place called Tyson’s Wells.

Desert Station appears on Arizona Territory maps between 1875 and 1880, and an itineraries in 1878. The name was retained for many years. It took its present form because it had a 120-foot well.

== See also ==
- Apache Wells, Arizona
