= Red Ghost =

Red Ghost may refer to:

- Red Ghost (folklore), a 19th-century ghost seated on a camel
- Red Ghost (character), a villain appearing in Marvel Comics
- Red Ghost Cave Archeological District, a 10-acre (4.0 ha) archeological site in Oklahoma
- The Red Ghost, a 2021 Russian film
- Blinky, the red ghost from Pac-Man

== See also ==
- Lady in Red (ghost), a type of female ghost, similar to the White Lady
