= Red Ghost (folklore) =

Arizona folklore figure

In Arizona folklore, the Red Ghost is a figure alleged to have roamed the Arizonan frontier in the late 19th century. It was said to have been a large red camel with a bleached human skeleton upon its back. Legends of it were widespread across Arizona, up until its supposed death before the dawn of the 20th century.

== Historical background ==
During the Westward expansion of the United States, military forces were looking for ways to ease transportation in arid regions. Various proposals were made for camels to be used as pack animals throughout the early 19th century, with a proposal by then Secretary of War Jefferson Davis ultimately being approved in 1855 with a budget of $30,000 in an experiment that would later become known as the Camel Corps. The process of acquiring camels began in the Mediterranean region, and over thirty were eventually procured. The project was originally deemed a success, but due to the American Civil War, it was largely scrapped. Although some of the camels were captured by confederate troops, others were sold off or abandoned, with reported sightings persisting for decades thereafter.

== History and legend ==
The legend began in 1883, when two men left their ranch house near Eagle Creek to check on their cattle. While they were out, one of the ranchers' wives heard the other woman scream after the dogs began loudly barking. She rushed to the window and saw what she described as a "huge, reddish-colored beast" ridden by a "devilish-looking creature", and proceeded to lock her front door and wait for the men to come back.

When the two men returned, they found the other's wife had been trampled to death. The men followed the footprints left by the creature the next day and found red hair in a bush. A few days later, a group of prospectors reported something tearing through their campground; red hair was later found at the site. The creature was again spotted just a few days later, this time being described as 30 feet (9.1 m) tall and knocking over two wagons. Red hair was again reportedly found. The legend would quickly spread through various tales; one described the creature killing and eating a grizzly bear, while another said it disappeared into thin air when chased, but the skeleton of a man on its back was a common element among the stories. A cowboy allegedly tried to lasso the animal, but was knocked to the ground and nearly killed by the creature, though not before witnessing the figure of a skeleton on its back. A few months later, a group of five men shot at the beast, missing the camel but shooting off the head of the skeleton, finding some hair and skin still attached to it.

The legend remained popular until 1893, when farmer Mizoo Hastings found the creature eating in his yard and proceeded to shoot it, killing it in a single shot. It was then discovered that the beast was a camel, with leather straps on the side stuck so tight that it was scarred. It remains unknown why a dead man was attached to the back. However, speculation has persisted over the years; with some positing that the corpse was that of a prospector dying of thirst who tied himself to the camel's back, hoping that the animal would lead him to water, while others alleged that a soldier was learning to ride a camel when the animal suddenly bolted off. According to writer Ron Dungan, the verifiability of some parts of the legend remains questionable, as some records are missing or have been lost over time.

== Legacy ==
A sculpture of the camel was erected in Quartzsite, Arizona, near the grave of Hi Jolly, an Ottoman camel driver who worked for the Camel Corps.
