= Fort Tyson =

Historic site in La Paz County, Arizona

Fort Tyson (1856)
- Fort
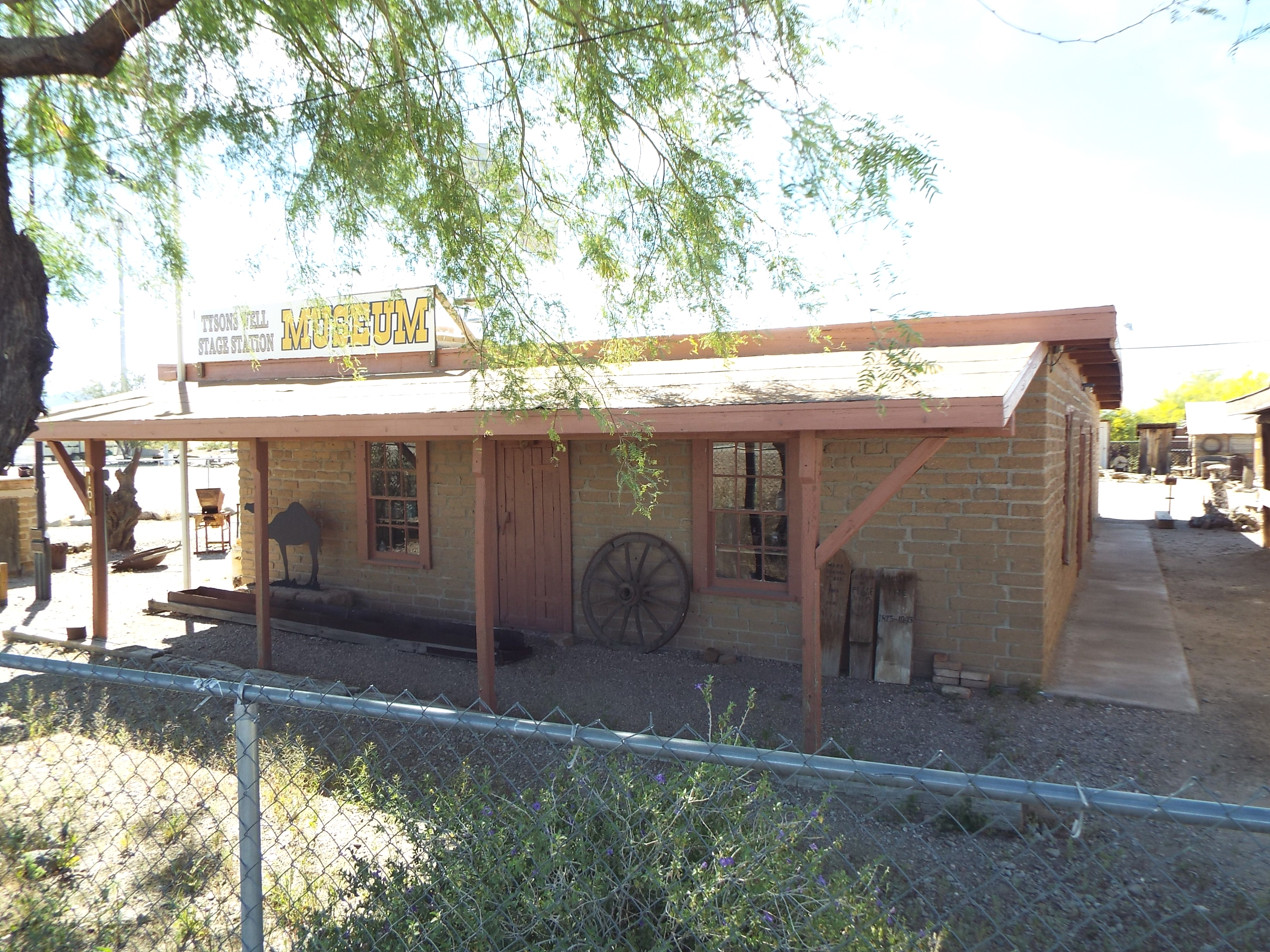
- Fort Tyson ruins

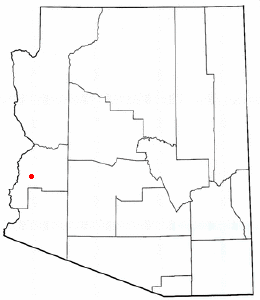
- Location in La Paz County and the state of Arizona
- Coordinates: 33°39′54″N 114°13′15″W
- Country: United States
- State: Arizona
- County: La Paz
- Website: Town of Quartzsite

Fort Tyson was a privately owned fort built in 1856 by Charles Tyson in the area which is now called Quartzsite, Arizona. He built the fort to protect the local miners and water supply from the raids of the Yavapai (Mohave-Apache), a Native-American tribe. The area in which Fort Tyson was located has been known as Fort Tyson, Tyson’s Well and is now called the town of Quartzsite because of the large amount of quartz found in its surrounding areas.

== Brief history ==
=== Fort Tyson ===
Charles Tyson was an early settler who saw the mining potential of what in the future was to become the town of Quartzsite. In the early years of the American gold rush, pan handlers began to arrive in Arizona searching for the precious metal. Gold deposits were discovered in the desert mountains of Plomosa and Dome Rock in the area and a boom in the mining industry followed.

Many of the early pioneers and miners who settled the area arrived from California and other places in the United States and abroad. The water supply in the area became the target of the Native-Americans who belonged to the Yavapai tribe (a.k.a. as Mohave-Apache). They resented the arrival of the Anglo-European settlers on their land and raided the early settlements. Charles Tyson therefore, decided to build a fort to protect the settlers and the water supply. He built the fort which became known as Fort Tyson, in 1856. The settlement also became known as Fort Tyson after the fort.

=== Tyson’s Well and stage station ===
In 1864, Tyson dug a well, which according to the Quartzsite Historical Society, was dug by hand. Today there is a historical marker on the spot where the well was supposedly dug. Tyson then built a stage station in 1866, which originally served the stage coaches that traveled from the towns of Ehrenberg and Prescott. Prescott at the time was the capital city of the Arizona Territory. The California and Arizona Stage Company began transporting passengers which included prospectors, since gold had been discovered in the mines of Wickenburg and Prescott, and made stops at the station. The Wells Fargo express also stopped by the station en route to Ehrenberg and Wickenburg from California. Tyson’s Well Stage Station became a busy stage coach station since it was located on the famous Butterfield Overland Mail route between Prescott, Arizona and Riverside, California.

Travel by railroad affected the commercial aspect of the area. The town fell under a complete state of abandonment when the stage lines stopped running in the area. However, there was a minor mining boom in 1897, which revitalized the town. That year the town was officially named Quartzsite and Tyson owned three stores, two saloons and a post office. Tyson’s Well stage station continued to provide rest and refreshment to travelers and freight drivers. However, the mining boom faded by 1900 and the town was once more abandoned and left with only 20 residents.

== Fort Tyson and Tyson's Well Stage Station ==
The following gallery has the images of the remains of the original Fort Tyson, Tyson's Well stage station and a replica of the Oasis Hotel:

- Ruins of Fort Tyson which was built in 1856 and is located on the corner of Main St. and Moon Mountain Road.
- The site where in 1864 Charles Tyson dug what is known as Tyson’s Well.
- Tyson’s Well Stage Station built in 1866 and located in 161 West Main Street. The stage station served the travelers who went back and forth from the towns of Ehrenberg and Wickenburg. The building now houses the Quartzite Museum and Historical Society.
- The watering well on the grounds of Tyson's Stage Station.
- The restored Oasis Hotel which was originally built in 1900 and located in Main Street.
Images of Quartzsite

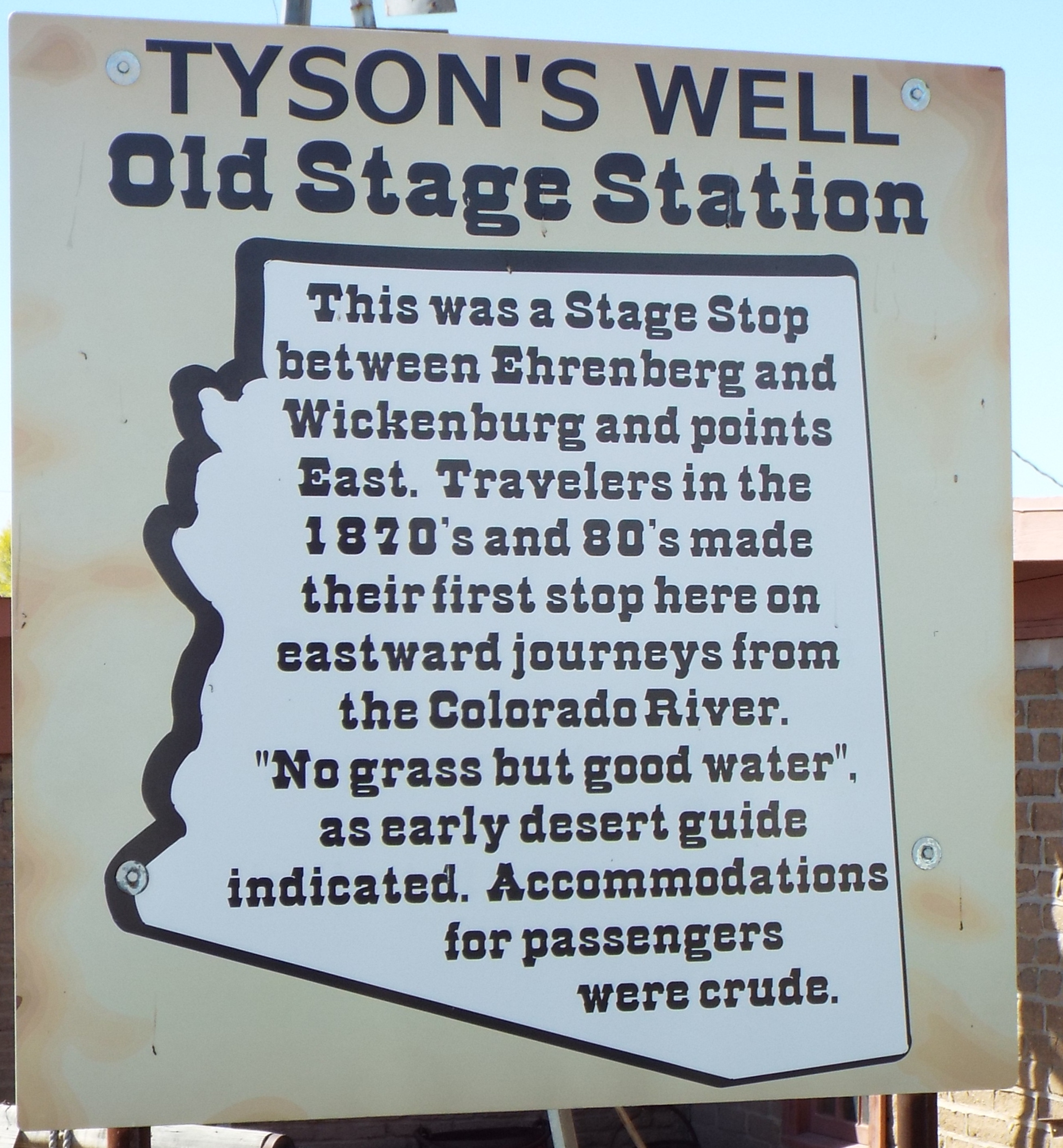
Tyson's Well Old Stage Station historic marker.

	Name	Image	Year		Name	Image	Year
1	Fort Tyson Ruins		1856	2	Fort Tyson Ruins		1856
3	Fort Tyson Ruins		1856	4	Tyson's Well		1864
5	Tyson's Well Stage Station		1866	6	Tyson's Well Stage Station		1866
7	Watering well in Tyson's Stage Station		1866	8	Oasis Hotel Replica		1900
9	Oasis Hotel Replica		1900				

== See also ==
Quartzsite, Arizona

- Fort Apache
- Fort Bowie
- Fort Buchanan
- Fort Crittenden
- Fort Defiance
- Fort Grant
- Fort Huachuca
- Fort Lowell
- Fort McDowell
- Fort Misery
- Fort Mojave
- Fort Verde
- Fort Whipple
- Fort Yuma
