= Yiorgos Caralambo =

Greek camel driver (c. 1828–1913)

- Greek George, George Allen.
- Born: c. 1828 somewhere in Asia Minor
- Died: September 2, 1913 (aged 85); Montebello, California
- Other name: George Allen
- Military career
- Branch: U.S. Army
- Nickname: Greek George
- Known for: Allegedly murdering Alfred Bent

Yiorgos Caralambo also called Greek George and George Allen (died September 2, 1913) was an alleged murderer and camel driver hired by U.S. Army in 1856 for the Camel Corps experiment in the Southwest. The camels were to be tested for use in transportation across the "Great American Desert."

== Biography ==
Caralambo, who was of Greek ancestry, was living in Smyrna, when he was selected for the Camel Corps. The American government hired eight camel drivers from Asia Minor to tend the animals. Caralambo and the other camel drivers arrived at the Port of Indianola in Lavaca County, Texas with their animals on the USS Supply. In Steven Dean Pastis's article "Go West Greek George," the eight men are identified: Caralambo, Hadji Ali (born as Philip Tedro), Mimico Teodora (Mico), Hadjiatis Yannaco (Long Tom), Anastasio Coralli (Short Tom), Michelo Georgios, Yanni Iliato and Giorgios Costi.

The United States had purchased a total of 33 camels: 3 in Tunis, 9 in Egypt and 21 in Smyrna. The Camel Corps hauled supplies to build the Butterfield Overland Stage Route from St. Louis, Missouri to Los Angeles. The route was completed by September 1858.

Through his service in the Camel Corps, Greek George met Major Henry Hancock, a Harvard trained lawyer and wealthy Los Angeles landowner. Hancock was so impressed by Caralambo's dedication that he wanted to employ him privately to drive camels carrying mail along the Butterfield Route. Hancock allowed Greek George to build a farmhouse with stables to house the dromedaries in the northwest part of Rancho La Brea, in present-day West Hollywood. The plan fell through when the Army disbanded the Camel Corps in 1862. Greek George was forced to turn the camels into the wild; they roamed the area for at least thirty years afterwards.

Greek George is alleged to have murdered Alfred Bent in 1865. Bent was the son of Charles Bent, the first territorial Governor of the New Mexico Territory during the US occupation in the Mexican-American War. Alfred was murdered at Taos on December 9, 1865. Greek George was allegedly hired by people with interests in the Maxwell Land Grant, 1/4 of which Alfred and his two sisters inherited from their father Charles. Lucien B. Maxwell, Charles Beaubien, and Guadalupe Miranda held large other portions of the grant.

Greek George remained at Rancho La Brea well into the 1870s, taking care of Major Hancock's cattle and horses. He became a naturalized United States citizen in 1867 and changed his name to George Allen. That same year, the U.S. Government deeded land to him in present-day Hollywood in recognition of his work with the Camel Corps.

On May 5, 1874, Tiburcio Vásquez, one of the most notorious California bandits of the 1870s and 1880s, was captured while hiding out in a shack behind the home of Caralambos, known to locals as "Greek George". Vásquez, who terrorized Southern California for over 23 years, frequently used Greek George's farmhouse as one of his numerous hideouts. Someone informed on Vásquez, possibly Greek George himself, enticed by the $15,000 reward. However, others claim it was a relative of Vásquez, angry because the outlaw had had an affair with the relative's niece. A posse led by Sheriff Albert Johnson rode from Los Angeles to Greek George's residence. The site is in present-day West Hollywood, thought to be near the corner of Santa Monica Boulevard and King's Road.

Caralambos later moved to Montebello, California and died near Mission Vieja in 1913.

== Historical landmark ==
The grave of George Caralambo became a California Historical Landmark No. 646 on May 5, 1958. The marker at the site reads:

- NO. 646 GRAVE OF GEORGE CARALAMBO, (GREEK GEORGE) – This is the grave of 'Greek George,' a camel driver from Asia Minor who came to the United States with the second load of camels purchased by the War Department as an experiment to open a wagon road to Fort Tejón from Fort Defiance, New Mexico. Because of the Civil War, the experiment was abandoned. 'Greek George' became a naturalized citizen in 1867 under the name of George Allen. He built an adobe home on Santa Monica Boulevard.
- The site of the marker is Broadway at Gregory Ave in Whittier, in the Founders' Memorial Park at 33.986823,-118.046399. Caralambo's tombstone is located in the Civil War section of the Whittier Museum, Whittier, CA.
