= Quartzsite, Arizona =

Town in La Paz County, Arizona, US

Quartzsite
- Town
- Quartzsite, Arizona
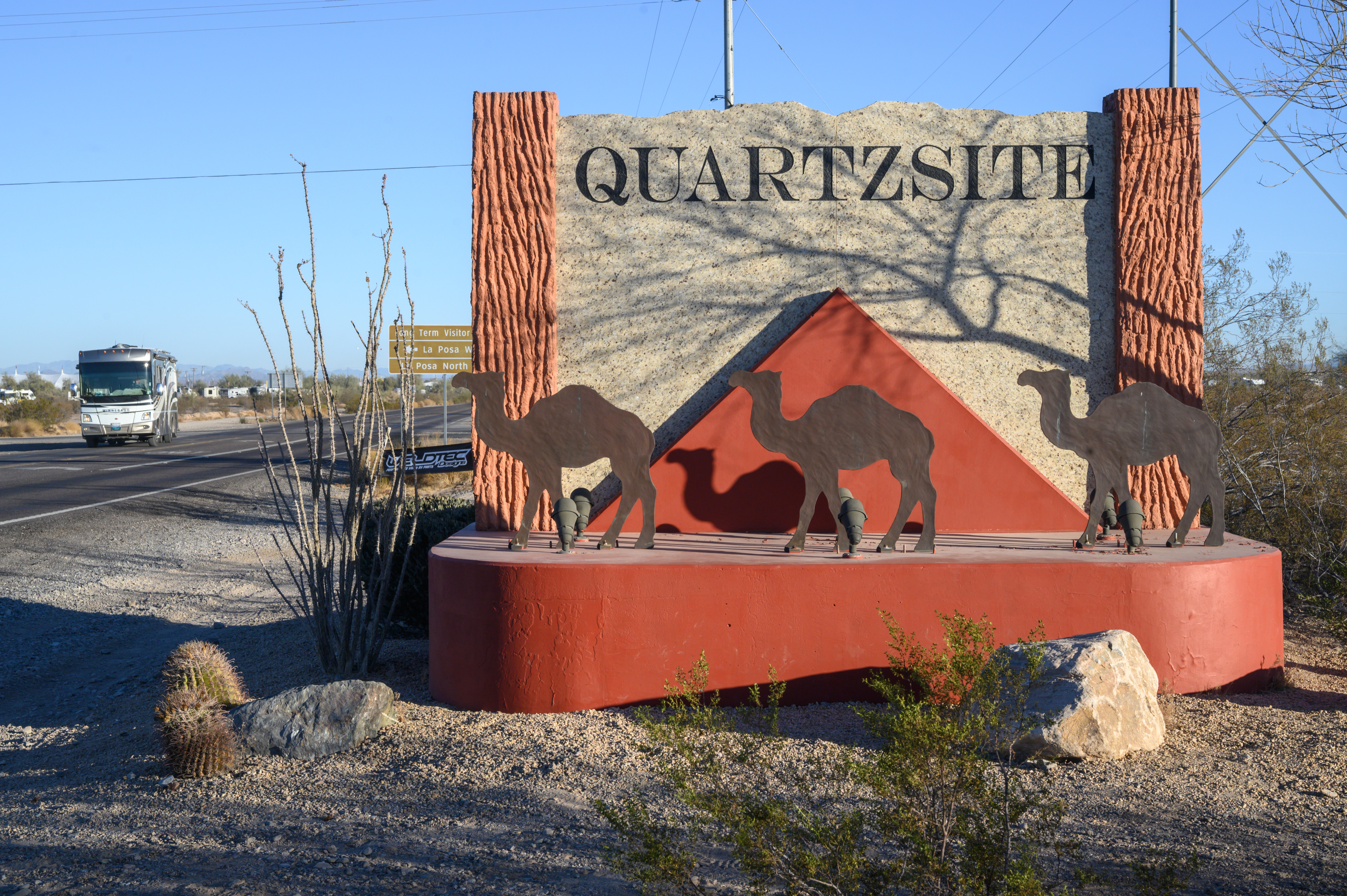
- Motto: "The Rock Capital of the World"
- Location of Quartzsite in La Paz County, Arizona

- Location in Arizona Location in The United States
- Coordinates: 33°38′45″N 114°13′48″W
- Country: United States
- State: Arizona
- County: La Paz
- Incorporated: 1989

Government
  - Mayor: Norm Simpson

Area
  - Total: 36.30 sq mi (94.01 km^{2})
  - Land: 36.30 sq mi (94.01 km^{2})
  - Water: 0 sq mi (0.00 km^{2})
- Elevation: 876 ft (267 m)

Population (2020)
  - Total: 2,413
  - Density: 66.5/sq mi (25.67/km^{2})
- Time zone: UTC-7 (MST (no DST))
- ZIP codes: 85346, 85359
- Area code: 928
- FIPS code: 04-58010
- GNIS feature ID: 2412516
- Website: Town of Quartzsite

Quartzsite is a town in La Paz County, Arizona, United States. According to the 2020 census, the population was 2,413.

Interstate 10 runs directly through Quartzsite, making it the first town many people see when driving into Arizona from the Greater Los Angeles region of California. It is also at the intersection of U.S. Route 95 and Arizona State Route 95 with I-10.

== History ==
Quartzsite's current location was the site of a waterhole from 1863 to the 1880s and was later a stage station, called Tyson's Wells, along the La Paz - Wikenburg Road on Tyson Wash, in what was then Yuma County, in the newly created Arizona Territory. It was about 20 miles from the Colorado River steamboat landing of La Paz and 25 miles from the landing of Ehrenberg from 1866. The next stop was 25 miles to the east at Desert Station.

Tyson's Wells in 1875 was described by Martha Summerhayes, in her book Vanished Arizona:

At all events, whatever Messrs. Hunt and Dudley were doing down there, their ranch (Desert Station) was clean and attractive, which was more than could be said of the place where we stopped the next night, a place called Tysons Wells. We slept in our tent that night, for of all places on the earth a poorly kept ranch in Arizona is the most melancholy and uninviting. It reeks of everything unclean, morally and physically.

In the valley around Tyson's Wells were places known to have been successfully worked by individual prospectors since the beginning of the Colorado River Gold Rush of the 1860s up until the 1950s. Some large scale operations in the early 20th century were failures.

On July 31, 1978, serial killer Randy Greenawalt killed four people in a mass shooting, including a one year old, a 15 year old, and two adults in their twenties.

In March 2006, 70-year-old Betty Lou Japel and 73-year-old Kenneth Miller were shot and killed by Gregory Cole. Japel remained unidentified for two years after her death.

== Geography and climate ==
According to the United States Census Bureau Quartzsite is all land and has a total area of 36.3 sq mi (94.0 km^{2}).

Quartzsite lies on the western portion of the La Posa Plain along Tyson Wash. The Dome Rock Mountains overlook the town on the west with Granite Mountain on the southwest edge of the town and Oldman Mountain on the northwest. The Plomosa Mountains lie across the La Posa Plain to the east.

The town has a hot desert climate (Köppen BWh) with mild to warm winters from November to March and hot to extreme summers for the remainder of the year. In the middle of summer, Quartzsite is one of the hottest places in the United States and has recorded temperatures as high as 124 °F or 51.1 °C on August 12, 1933 and July 11, 1934.

There is very little precipitation with only 4.58 inches (116.3 mm) falling during an average year, while in May and June more than 80 percent of years do not have measurable rainfall. Since records began in 1928 the wettest month has been September 1939 with 6.16 inches (156.5 mm) which was part of the wettest year with 11.05 inches (280.7 mm) and featuring on September 5 the wettest day with 3.00 inches (76.2 mm). This moisture was due to the remnants of a rare Gulf of California hurricane. The driest calendar year was 1928 with 0.92 inches (23.4 mm). However, between July 2001 and August 2002 as little as 0.45 inches (11.4 mm) fell over thirteen months.

Climate data for Quartzsite, Arizona, 1991–2020 normals, extremes 1908–present
Month	Jan	Feb	Mar	Apr	May	Jun	Jul	Aug	Sep	Oct	Nov	Dec	Year
Record high °F (°C)	87 (31)	90 (32)	100 (38)	111 (44)	121 (49)	123 (51)	124 (51)	124 (51)	120 (49)	108 (42)	97 (36)	84 (29)	124 (51)
Mean maximum °F (°C)	76.3 (24.6)	82.1 (27.8)	91.3 (32.9)	100.6 (38.1)	107.1 (41.7)	114.2 (45.7)	116.7 (47.1)	115.1 (46.2)	110.7 (43.7)	101.4 (38.6)	88.8 (31.6)	76.0 (24.4)	118.0 (47.8)
Mean daily maximum °F (°C)	66.6 (19.2)	71.2 (21.8)	78.9 (26.1)	86.6 (30.3)	95.3 (35.2)	105.0 (40.6)	108.7 (42.6)	107.9 (42.2)	101.8 (38.8)	89.5 (31.9)	75.7 (24.3)	64.9 (18.3)	87.7 (30.9)
Daily mean °F (°C)	53.4 (11.9)	57.7 (14.3)	64.7 (18.2)	71.7 (22.1)	80.6 (27.0)	90.1 (32.3)	95.5 (35.3)	94.8 (34.9)	87.8 (31.0)	74.6 (23.7)	61.2 (16.2)	51.8 (11.0)	73.7 (23.2)
Mean daily minimum °F (°C)	40.2 (4.6)	44.3 (6.8)	50.5 (10.3)	56.8 (13.8)	65.9 (18.8)	75.1 (23.9)	82.3 (27.9)	81.7 (27.6)	73.9 (23.3)	59.7 (15.4)	46.8 (8.2)	38.8 (3.8)	59.7 (15.4)
Mean minimum °F (°C)	28.4 (−2.0)	33.3 (0.7)	38.6 (3.7)	44.7 (7.1)	53.3 (11.8)	63.0 (17.2)	72.4 (22.4)	72.0 (22.2)	60.2 (15.7)	46.0 (7.8)	33.6 (0.9)	27.2 (−2.7)	25.7 (−3.5)
Record low °F (°C)	9 (−13)	17 (−8)	24 (−4)	27 (−3)	40 (4)	43 (6)	52 (11)	54 (12)	42 (6)	30 (−1)	17 (−8)	16 (−9)	9 (−13)
Average precipitation inches (mm)	0.66 (17)	0.65 (17)	0.45 (11)	0.13 (3.3)	0.13 (3.3)	0.05 (1.3)	0.47 (12)	0.51 (13)	0.46 (12)	0.23 (5.8)	0.28 (7.1)	0.56 (14)	4.58 (116.8)
Average snowfall inches (cm)	0.2 (0.51)	0.0 (0.0)	0.0 (0.0)	0.0 (0.0)	0.0 (0.0)	0.0 (0.0)	0.0 (0.0)	0.0 (0.0)	0.0 (0.0)	0.0 (0.0)	0.0 (0.0)	0.0 (0.0)	0.2 (0.51)
Average precipitation days (≥ 0.01 in)	2.2	2.6	1.8	0.8	0.4	0.2	2.1	2.3	1.7	1.1	1.1	2.3	18.6
Average snowy days (≥ 0.1 in)	0.0	0.0	0.0	0.0	0.0	0.0	0.0	0.0	0.0	0.0	0.0	0.0	0.0
Source 1: NOAA
Source 2: National Weather Service

== Demographics ==
Historical population
Census	Pop.	Note	%±
1980	1,193		—
1990	1,876		57.3%
2000	3,354		78.8%
2010	3,677		9.6%
2020	2,413		−34.4%
U.S. Decennial Census

=== 2020 census ===
As of the 2020 census, Quartzsite had a population of 2,413. The median age was 67.4 years. 7.5% of residents were under the age of 18 and 56.1% of residents were 65 years of age or older. For every 100 females there were 105.7 males, and for every 100 females age 18 and over there were 105.1 males age 18 and over.

94.5% of residents lived in urban areas, while 5.5% lived in rural areas.

There were 1,427 households in Quartzsite, of which 9.3% had children under the age of 18 living in them. Of all households, 35.7% were married-couple households, 31.0% were households with a male householder and no spouse or partner present, and 27.1% were households with a female householder and no spouse or partner present. About 48.3% of all households were made up of individuals and 32.7% had someone living alone who was 65 years of age or older.

There were 2,700 housing units, of which 47.1% were vacant. The homeowner vacancy rate was 1.7% and the rental vacancy rate was 16.7%.

Racial composition as of the 2020 census
Race	Number	Percent
White	2,087	86.5%
Black or African American	12	0.5%
American Indian and Alaska Native	24	1.0%
Asian	3	0.1%
Native Hawaiian and Other Pacific Islander	2	0.1%
Some other race	101	4.2%
Two or more races	184	7.6%
Hispanic or Latino (of any race)	228	9.4%

=== 2000 census ===
As of the census of 2000, there were 3,354 people, 1,850 households, and 1,176 families residing in the town. The population density was 92.4 inhabitants per square mile (35.7/km^{2}). There were 3,186 housing units at an average density of 87.8 per square mile (33.9/km^{2}). The racial makeup of the town was 94.5% White, 0.2% Black or African American, 1.2% Native American, 0.3% Asian, 0.1% Pacific Islander, 2.6% from other races, and 1.2% from two or more races. 5.0% of the population were Hispanic or Latino of any race.

There were 1,850 households, out of which 5.0% had children under the age of 18 living with them, 59.0% were married couples living together, 2.9% had a female householder with no husband present, and 36.4% were non-families. 31.5% of all households were made up of individuals, and 19.1% had someone living alone who was 65 years of age or older. The average household size was 1.81 and the average family size was 2.18.

In the town, the population was spread out, with 5.7% under the age of 18, 1.8% from 18 to 24, 7.7% from 25 to 44, 29.9% from 45 to 64, and 54.9% who were 65 years of age or older. The median age was 66 years. For every 100 females, there were 102.8 males. For every 100 females age 18 and over, there were 101.9 males.

The median income for a household in the town was $23,053, and the median income for a family was $26,382. Males had a median income of $20,313 versus $16,080 for females. The per capita income for the town was $15,889. About 7.8% of families and 13.5% of the population were below the poverty line, including 20.3% of those under age 18 and 10.0% of those age 65 or over.

== Tourism ==
Quartzsite is a popular recreational vehicle camping area for winter visitors with tourism being the major contributor to Quartzsite's economy. The Rubber Tramp Rendezvous, an annual gathering of vandwellers, takes place in January. Nine major gem and mineral shows, and 15 general swap meet shows are very popular tourist attractions, attracting about 1.5 million people annually, mostly during January and February.

Quartzsite is the burial place of Hi Jolly (Hadji Ali), an Ottoman citizen of Greek-Syrian parentage, who took part in the experimental US Camel Corps as a camel driver. The Hi Jolly Monument was added to the National Register of Historic Places in 2011.

Quartzsite is also the site of Joanne's Gum Museum, which is open to the public and features a large collection of gum wrappers from around the world.

The Arizona Peace Trail goes through Quartzsite.

== Transportation ==
The town of Quartzsite operates demand response buses under the name Camel Express that provide weekday service to Quartzsite and La Paz Valley, weekly service to Parker, twice monthly service to Yuma and Blythe, and monthly service to Lake Havasu City. Greyhound Lines serves Quartzsite on its route from Los Angeles to Dallas. Freeways and state highways in Quartzsite include:

- Interstate 10
- State Route 95

== Gallery ==
The following gallery includes the images of:

- Ruins of the Hagely store, which was built in 1890s and is located on the corner of Main St. and Moon Mountain Road.
- Tyson's Well Stage Station, traditionally called “Fort Tyson” (though was never a military station) was built beginning in 1866 and is located at 161 West Main Street. The stage station served the travelers who went back and forth from the towns of Ehrenberg and Wickenburg. The building now houses the Quartzsite Museum and Historical Society.
- The restored Oasis Hotel, which was originally built in 1900 and is located adjacent to the Stage Station Museum.
- The grave of Hi Jolly (1828–1902), a.k.a. Haji Ali, a.k.a. Phillip Tedro. The grave, located in the Hi Jolly Cemetery, was listed in the National Register of Historic Places on February 28, 2011, reference #11000054.

	Name	Image	Year		Name	Image	Year
1	Hagely Store Ruins (Camelot)		1890	2	Tyson’s Well Site		1864
3	Tyson's Well Stage Station		1866	4	Oasis Hotel Replica		1900
5	Hi Jolly Monument		1903	6	Abandoned mine near Quartzsite		unknown

== In popular culture ==
One of the primary locations in the 1988 computer role-playing game Wasteland is the town of Quartz. Wasteland Scenario Designer Ken St. Andre, a lifelong resident of Phoenix, Arizona, confirmed that Quartz is fictionalized version of the real town of "Quartzite" [sic].

William Hogan's 1981 coming-of-age novel The Quartzsite Trip is set largely in the town of Quartzsite.

== See also ==
- Fort Tyson
- List of historic properties in Quartzsite, Arizona
