= United States Camel Corps =

1856–1866 United States Army experiment

- Active: 1856–1866
- Country: United States
- Branch: U.S. Army
- Type: Quartermaster
- Role: Experimental
- Post: Camp Verde, Texas

Commanders
- First commander: Major Henry C. Wayne

The United States Camel Corps was a mid-19th-century experiment by the United States Army in using camels as pack animals in the Southwestern United States. Although the camels proved to be hardy and well suited to travel through the region, the Army declined to adopt them for military use. The Civil War interfered with the experiment, which was eventually abandoned; the animals were sold at auction.

== Origin ==
In 1836, Major George H. Crosman, United States Army, who was convinced from his experiences in the American Indian Wars in Florida that camels would be useful as beasts of burden, encouraged the War Department to use camels for transportation. In 1848 or earlier, Major Henry C. Wayne conducted a more detailed study and recommended importation of camels to the War Department. Wayne's opinions agreed with those of then Senator Jefferson Davis of Mississippi. Davis was unsuccessful until he was appointed as Secretary of War in 1853 by President Franklin Pierce. When US forces were required to operate in arid and desert regions, the President and Congress began to take the idea seriously. Davis found the Army needed to improve transportation in the southwestern US, which he and most observers thought a great desert. In his annual report for 1854, Davis wrote, "I again invite attention to the advantages to be anticipated from the use of camels and dromedaries for military and other purposes ..." On March 3, 1855, the US Congress appropriated $30,000 (equivalent to $1,036,607 in 2025) for the project. A report entitled "Purchase of Camels for the Purpose of Military Transportation" was issued by Davis in 1857.

In later years, Edward Fitzgerald Beale reportedly told his son, Truxtun, that the idea of using camels came to him when he was exploring Death Valley with Kit Carson. Jefferson Davis, then Secretary of War, sympathized with Beale, and Beale persuaded his friend and kinsman Lieutenant David Dixon Porter to apply for command of the expedition to acquire the camels. The account is not supported by Beale's diaries or papers.

== Acquisition ==
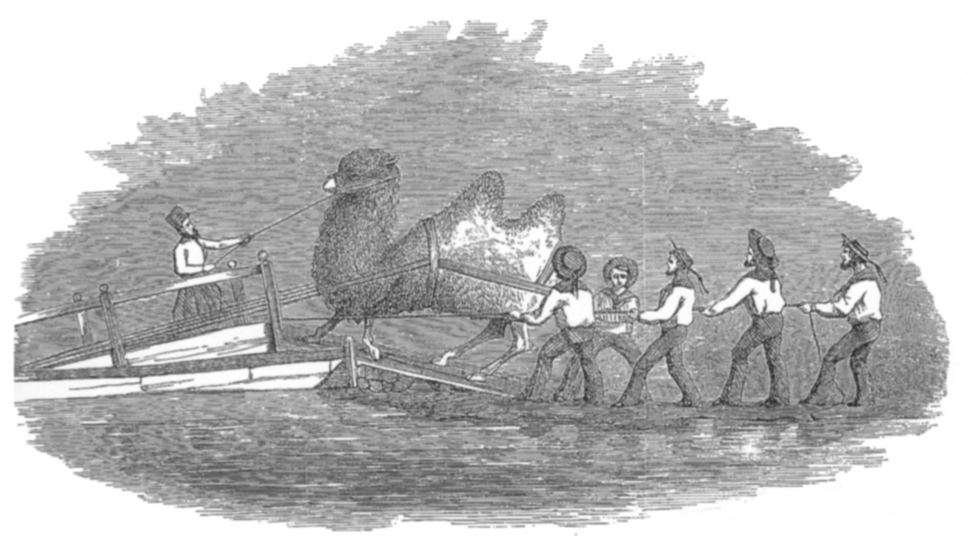
Drawing of loading a camel

Major Wayne was assigned to procure the camels. On June 4, 1855, Wayne departed New York City on board USS Supply, under the command of then Lieutenant David Dixon Porter. After arriving in the Mediterranean Sea, Wayne and Porter began procuring camels. Stops included Goletta (Tunisia), Malta, Greece, Turkey, and Egypt. They acquired 33 animals (19 females and 14 males), including two Bactrian, 29 dromedary, one dromedary calf, and one booghdee (a cross between a male Bactrian and a female dromedary). The two officers also acquired pack saddles and covers, being certain that proper saddles could not be purchased in the United States. Wayne and Porter hired five camel drivers, some Arab and some Turkish, and on February 15, 1856, Supply set sail for Texas. Porter established strict rules for the care, watering, and feeding of the animals in his charge; no experiments were conducted regarding how long a camel could survive without water.

During the crossing, one male camel died, but two calves were born and survived the trip. On May 14, 1856, 34 camels (a net gain of one) were safely unloaded at Indianola, Texas. All the surviving animals were in better health than when the vessel sailed for the United States. On Davis' orders, Porter sailed again for Egypt to acquire more camels. While Porter was on the second voyage, Wayne marched the camels from the first voyage to Camp Verde, Texas by way of San Antonio. On February 10, 1857, Supply returned with a herd of 41 camels. During the second expedition, Porter hired "nine men and a boy," including Hi Jolly. While Porter was on his second mission, five camels from the first herd died. The newly acquired animals joined the first herd at Camp Verde, which had been officially designated as the camel station. The Army then had 70 camels.

== Use in the Southwest ==
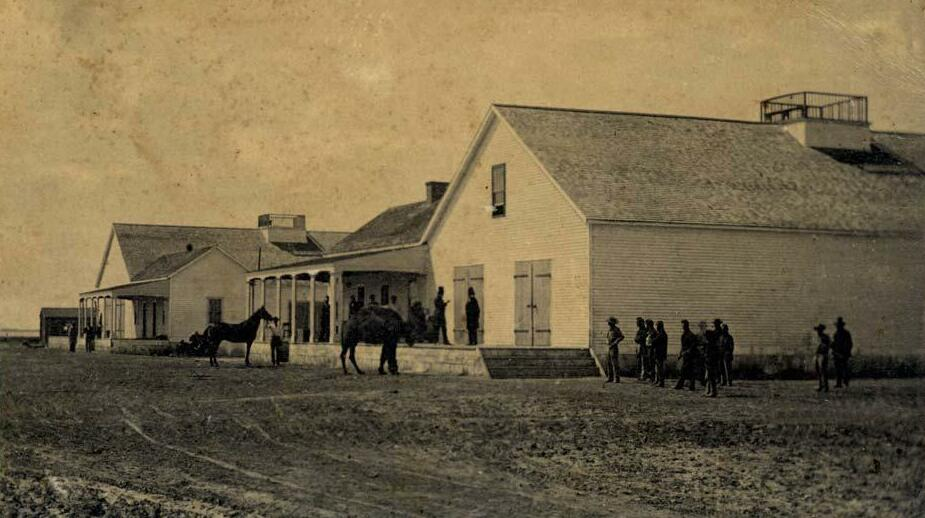
Camel at Drum Barracks, San Pedro, California (1863 or earlier)

Wayne attempted a breeding program for the camels, but his plans were put aside when Secretary Davis wrote that the animals were to be tested to determine if they could be used to accomplish a military objective.

In 1857, James Buchanan became President; John B. Floyd succeeded Davis as Secretary of War; and Wayne, who was reassigned to duties with the Quartermaster General in Washington, DC, was replaced by Captain Innis N. Palmer. Also in 1857, in response to a citizen petition to establish a road connecting the East and West, Congress authorized a contract to survey a wagon road along the 35th parallel from Fort Defiance, New Mexico Territory, to the Colorado River on what is now the Arizona–California border. Former Navy lieutenant Edward Fitzgerald Beale won the contract and learned afterward that Secretary Floyd required him to take 25 camels with him. The first part of the trip required traveling from Camp Verde through San Antonio, Fort Davis, and El Paso, crossing the Texas–New Mexico Territory border, and passing through Albuquerque to arrive at Fort Defiance. The expedition left San Antonio on June 25, 1857, and 25 pack camels accompanied a train of mule-drawn wagons. Each camel carried a load of 600 pounds. Beale wrote very favorably about the camels' endurance and packing abilities. Among his comments was that he would rather have one camel than four mules. Beale's comments led Floyd to report to Congress that camels had proved to be successful as a mode of transportation and to recommend that Congress authorize the purchase of an additional 1,000 animals. Congress did not act. Beale and his party reached the Colorado River on October 26, 1857. After crossing into California, Beale used the camels for various purposes on his ranch near Bakersfield. Beale offered to keep the Army's camels on his property, but Union Secretary of War Edwin Stanton rejected the offer.

On March 25, 1859, Secretary Floyd directed reconnaissance of the area between the Pecos River and the Rio Grande using the camels still available in Texas. Lieutenant William E. Echols of the Army Topographical Engineers was assigned to conduct the reconnaissance. Lieutenant Edward L. Hartz commanded the escort, with instructions from David Hammond Vinton, the quartermaster of the Department of Texas, to make use of the camels and provide a report on their performance. The train included 24 camels and 24 mules. It set out in May 1859. The expedition arrived at Camp Hudson on May 18. The group remained at Camp Hudson for five days and then departed for Fort Stockton, Texas, arriving on June 12. On June 15, the expedition set out for the mouth of Independence Creek to test the camels' ability to survive without water. The distance traveled was about 85 miles at four miles per hour. The camels showed no desire for water during the trip, but were watered upon arrival. The party then set out on a 114-mile, four-day journey to Fort Davis near the Rio Grande. During this segment of the journey, one of the camels was bitten on its leg by a rattlesnake; the wound was treated and the animal suffered no ill effects. Upon reaching Fort Davis, the horses and mules were distressed, but the camels were not. After a three-day rest, the expedition returned directly to Fort Stockton. Hartz wrote that "the superiority of the camel for military purposes in the badly-watered sections of the country seems to be well established."

Another reconnaissance began July 11, 1859, from Fort Stockton to San Vicente, Texas, arriving July 18. The expedition traveled roughly 24 miles per day for seven days over extremely rough terrain. After camping one night in San Vicente, the party returned to Fort Stockton, arriving July 28.

Robert E. Lee had first seen the camels in 1857. On May 31, 1860, Lee, who was still a U.S. Army officer and temporary commander of the Department of Texas, ordered Echols on another reconnaissance between Camp Hudson and Fort Davis. Part of Echols's mission was to locate a site for a camp near the Comanche. The train consisted of 20 camels, of which only one was a male, and 25 mules. On June 24, the expedition, which was joined by an infantry escort commanded by Lieutenant J. H. Holman, marched from Camp Hudson toward the Pecos River. The camels again performed better than the mules. As the march continued through extremely dry country, Echols feared for the lives of his men and the animals. On the fifth day, the party reached San Francisco Creek, a tributary of the Rio Grande, with almost no water left. Three mules died on this leg of the journey, but all of the camels survived. After resting for a day at a waterhole, Echols led his command to Fort Davis. Echols decided that one man and nine mules had to be left at Davis because they were unable to continue. On July 17, the expedition arrived at Presidio del Norte near the Rio Grande. Echols found what he believed to be a suitable location for a camp. The expedition returned through Fort Stockton to Camp Hudson, arriving in early August. The detachment was released to its home post, and the camels were returned to Camp Verde. Lee wrote to Adjutant General Samuel Cooper "... of camels whose endurance, docility and sagacity will not fail to attract attention of the Secretary of War, and but for whose reliable services the reconnaissance would have failed." The reconnaissance ordered by Lee was the last long-range use of the camels before the outbreak of the Civil War.

Their Arabian camels readily ate creosote bush, which few other organisms eat. It is thought that this meeting reestablished a biological relationship that was broken when the American ancestors and relatives of the Arabian camel, such as Camelops, became extinct, making an evolutionary anachronism.

== Aftermath ==
In a February 14, 1861 letter addressed to the Buchanan administration, King Mongkut of Siam referenced the introduction of the camel and offered his collaboration if the US wished to do the same with the Asian elephant. Mongkut reasoned that pairs of elephants could be released in American forests, where they would multiply and be captured later for use as beasts of burden in forested areas without roads. Buchanan's successor Abraham Lincoln politely declined the offer on February 3, 1862 arguing that "Our political jurisdiction, however, does not reach a latitude so low as to favor the multiplication of the elephant, and steam on land, as well as on water, has been our best and most efficient agent of transportation in internal commerce."

Early in the Civil War, an attempt was made to use the camels to carry mail between Fort Mohave, New Mexico Territory, on the Colorado River and New San Pedro, California, but the attempt was unsuccessful after the commanders of both posts objected. Later in the war, the Army had no further interest in the animals and they were sold at auction in 1864. The last of the animals from California was reportedly seen in Arizona in 1891.

In spring 1861, Camp Verde, Texas fell into Confederate hands until it was recaptured in 1865. The Confederate commander issued a receipt to the United States for 12 mules, 80 camels and two Egyptian camel drivers. There were reports of the animals being used to transport baggage, but there was no evidence that they were assigned to Confederate units. When Union troops reoccupied Camp Verde, there were estimated to be more than 100 camels at the camp, but there may have been others roaming the countryside. In 1866, the government was able to round up 66 camels, which it sold to Bethel Coopwood. The U.S. Army's camel experiment was complete. The last year a camel was seen in the vicinity of Camp Verde was 1875; the animal's fate is unknown.

Among the reasons the camel experiment failed was that it was supported by Jefferson Davis, who left the United States to become President of the Confederate States of America. The U.S. Army was a horse-and-mule organization whose soldiers did not have the skills to control a foreign asset.

One of the male animals at Fort Tejon was killed by another male during rutting season. Lieutenant Sylvester Mowry forwarded the dead animal's bones to the Smithsonian Institution, where they were placed on display.

A released camel or a descendent of one is believed to have inspired the Arizonan legend of the Red Ghost.

One of the few camel drivers whose name survives was Hi Jolly. He lived out his life in the United States. After his death in 1902, he was buried in Quartzsite, Arizona. His grave is marked by a pyramid-shaped monument topped with a metal profile of a camel.

== In popular culture ==
- The 1954 film Southwest Passage (originally titled Camel Corps) deals with the subject.
- The long-running TV anthology series Death Valley Days recounted the camel tale in a 1957 episode entitled "Camel Train".
- In the 1957 TV show Have Gun Will Travel episode "The Great Mojave Chase" features the hero Paladin entering a long marathon-like race contest through the desert while riding a camel left over from the Camel Corps instead of a horse. Along the way he takes time to help townspeople who are suffering under a man who controls their water. The episode was written by Gene Roddenberry.
- The Lucky Luke anthology album La Corde du pendu includes a story titled La Mine du chameau, which features a fictionalized account of the Camel Corps venture and its aftermath.
- In season one of the series Maverick, Bret Maverick (James Garner) wins a "full blooded Arabian mount, Imported!" which turns out to be a camel which drives the story in the episode "Relic of Fort Tejon" (1957).
- In 1976, Joe Camp directed and released a comedy loosely based on the U.S. Camel Corps titled Hawmps!
- The 1997 alternate history novel How Few Remain by Harry Turtledove depicts the Confederate States Army using camel-mounted soldiers in Texas, Mexico, and Arizona during the 1870s and 1880s. The introduction of the camels is attributed to President Jefferson Davis before the War of Secession.
- The 2019 historical fiction novel Inland by Téa Obreht includes a first-person storyline told by a young outlaw of Balkan Muslim descent to his camel companion after going on the run together in Arizona Territory. The narrator's story includes witnessing the arrival of camels to Indianola and unexpectedly joining the team of camel drivers on their trek from Texas to the Colorado River. Throughout the journey, he bonds with a camel named Burke and other members of the U.S. Camel Corps, including Hi Jolly (Hadji Ali) and Yiorgos Caralambo (Greek George).

== See also ==
- Cariboo camels
- Camel cavalry
- Douglas the camel
- Topsy the Camel
- Military animal
- Afghan cameleers in Australia
