= Martha Summerhayes =

American memoirist

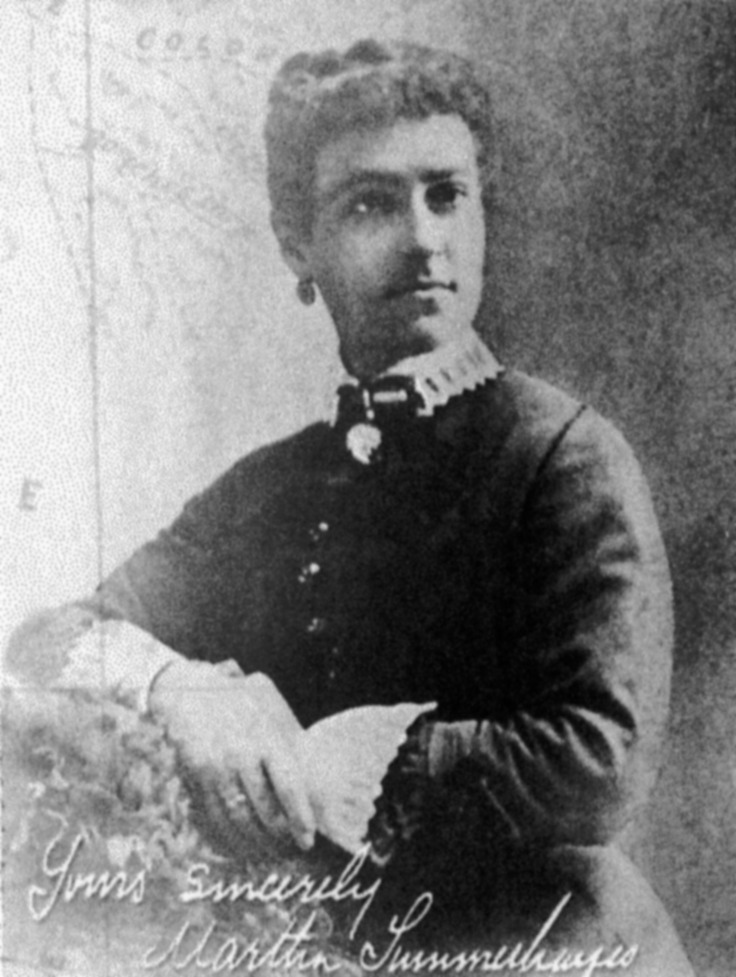
- Born: Martha Dunham; October 21, 1844; Nantucket, Massachusetts
- Died: May 12, 1926 (aged 81); Schenectady, New York
- Resting place: Arlington National Cemetery
- Occupation: Memoirist
- Spouse: John Wyer Summerhayes (m. 1873)

Martha Summerhayes (October 21, 1844 – May 12, 1926) was an American memoirist.

She was a Nantucket, Massachusetts, native who later on in life immigrated to Arizona. A well travelled and educated woman, Summerhayes spent two years, from 1871 to 1873, studying literature in Germany. Her passion for writing took her into a career as a writer. She became well known as a writer in Massachusetts, but she usually did her writing during the winter, which, in turn, led to her becoming interested in the warmer weather of Arizona.

In 1873, she married soldier John Wyer Summerhayes, a veteran of the American Civil War.

Wyer Summerhayes was still in the military when the couple married, so Martha further expanded her travels by going with her husband wherever the military sent him when no war was being fought. The Summerhayes arrived at Fort Russell, near Cheyenne, Wyoming, shortly after marrying. In 1874, they were sent by the military to an Arizona that at the time counted with only about 20,000 inhabitants. They stayed at a ranch owned by Corydon Cooley, a White man who had two Indian wives.

Accommodations at Cooley's ranch were quite different from what Martha Summerhayes had experience in the east and Europe. She was also disturbed by the fact that Cooley had two wives. Her observations were published in 1908 in an autobiography named "Vanished Arizona" that details her memories of Arizona and the West before widespread settlement and the experiences of military wives.

Summerhayes travelled, in August 1874, about 200 miles by a steamboat to Fort Mohave from Fort Yuma, enduring temperatures along the Colorado River that soared to 122 degrees.

Soon after arriving at Fort Mohave, the military and their families loaded their belongings into wagons, heading to Prescott, near where Fort Whipple stood. For Martha Summerhayes, the experience of traveling through the desert was both adventurous and frightening; she was not used to using snake protection before sleep, witnessing dogs being eaten to their deaths by these animals, and other experiences.

Soon after arriving at Prescott, the group of soldiers and their families moved slightly to the north, to Camp Verde.

Martha Summerhayes by this point began to think that the military had better accommodations for prostitutes than they had for the soldiers' wives themselves. In Camp Verde, she befriended Mrs. George Brayton, who advised her to "Take all you need, and it will get carried along, somehow". The military group, consisting of 100 people, mostly men, faced a two-month-long trip to Camp Apache, passing by the Mogollon Rim. According to Summerhayes in her autobiography, they were attacked by Indians along the way.

During that era, Apache Indians went twice a week to Camp Apache to be counted and receive food and water. At one point, she noticed that one Apache woman had a disfigured face and that she had lost her nose because she had supposedly committed adultery.

Another time, she was watching a show, when the Apache chief "Diablo" supposedly approached major William Worth and asked him how many ponies would Worth accept in exchange for Worth's wife. Again, she attended an Apache show, and she feared for her life when the Indians, painted and wearing feathers, began to jump and shout around fires. She said that they had knives and recalled her fear. Eventually, she was able to leave the show.

During her stay at Camp Apache, she found out that soldiers had also used cruelty in killing Apaches. Once handed a box, she noticed a foul smell coming from it. A soldier told her that the box had rotten cheese, and, in reality, it had the head of an Apache Indian, a fact which she found out about later, because she did not open the box herself. In January 1875, she was by herself as she gave birth to her son Harry. She had to perform various tasks by herself, because there were no nurses around, no running water for her or the newborn, barely any food (she and her baby survived the first days only on vegetables and milk), and, perhaps more importantly, no doctor to attend to them, as the military doctor on base was not well prepared to handle newborns and their mothers.

In April 1875, despite the pleas of Mexicans not to try to travel to Phoenix because of hazards related to warring tribes, the Summerhayes made it to Arizona's future capital. Soon after, however, she and her husband, whom she affectionately nicknamed "Jack", moved back to Nantucket, thinking about baby Harry's welfare and about the hot Arizona summers. But they missed Arizona and returned shortly afterwards.

In 1878, the Summerhayes moved to California. This was followed by various other moves which were appointed by the military. After Geronimo's campaign was over, the Summerhayes were ordered to Arizona once again. They arrived at Tucson using a Pullman car.

In 1900, her husband retired from the military, and the Summerhayes returned to the East, where they lived in various cities including Washington, D.C., New York and Nantucket.

After her 1908 autobiography was published, Martha Summerhayes became a celebrity, receiving fan mail from hundreds of people, especially military men and students that valued her view of military.

Martha Summerhayes died on May 12, 1926, at Schenectady, New York. She and her husband John are buried next to each other, at the Arlington National Cemetery.
