= Hi Jolly =

Camel driver for the US Camel Corps (1828–1902)

Hi Jolly Hadji Ali Philip Tedro
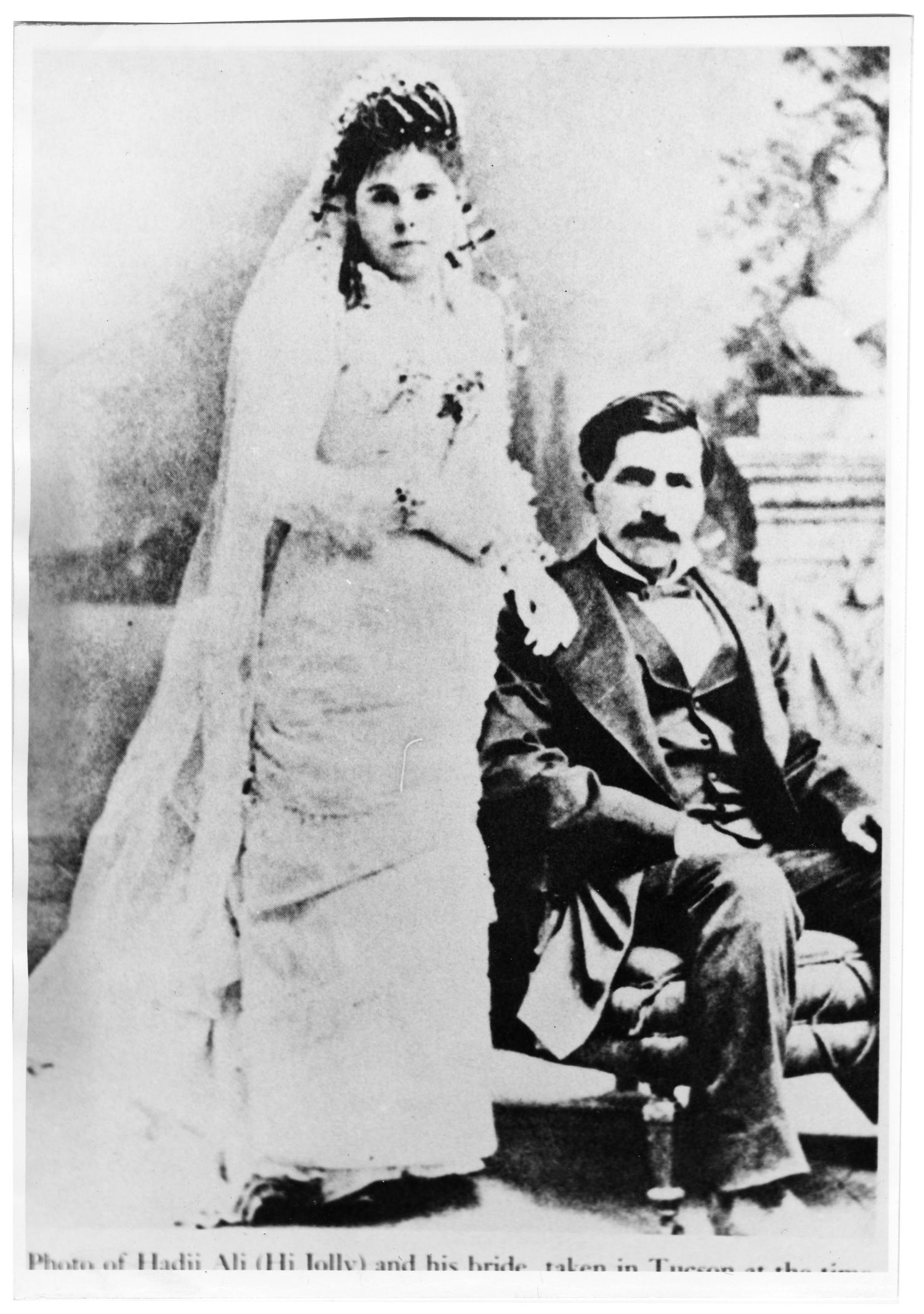
- Born: Ali c. 1828; Smyrna, Aidin Eyalet, Ottoman Empire
- Died: December 16, 1902 (aged 73–74); Quartzsite, Arizona Territory, U.S.
- Occupations: Camel driver (Camel Corps), miner, scout
- Spouse: Gertrudis Serna
- Children: 2

Hi Jolly or Hadji Ali (Arabic: حاج علي, romanized: Ḥājj ʿAlī; Turkish: Hacı Ali), also known as Philip Tedro (c. 1828 – December 16, 1902), was an Ottoman subject of Syrian and Greek parentage, and in 1856 became one of the first camel drivers ever hired by the US Army to lead the camel driver experiment in the Southwest.

== Biography ==
Ali was born as Philip Tedro in Smyrna around 1828, to a Greek mother and a Syrian Christian Arab father. As a young adult, he converted to Islam. After going to Mecca to perform the hajj (pilgrimage), he called himself Hadji Ali. He reverted to Philip Tedro in later life.

An Ottoman citizen of the region of Syria, Ali worked as a camel breeder and trainer. He served with the French Army in Algiers before signing on as a camel driver for the US Army in 1856.

Ali was one of several men hired by the United States Army to introduce camels as beasts of burden to transport cargo across the "Great American Desert." Eight of the men – including Ali – were of Greek origin. They arrived at the Port of Indianola in Calhoun County, Texas on the USS Supply. The book Go West Greek George by Steven Dean Pastis, published in both Greek and English, specifically identifies all eight men. These pioneers were Yiorgos Caralambo (later known as Greek George), Hadji Ali (Hi Jolly, a.k.a. Philip Tedro), Mimico Teodora (Mico), Hadjiatis Yannaco (Long Tom), Anastasio Coralli (Short Tom), Michelo Georgios, Yanni Iliato, and Giorgios Costi. The Americans acquired 33 camels (three camels in Tunis, nine in Egypt, and 21 in Smyrna). Ali was the lead camel driver during the US Army's experiment with the U.S. Camel Corps in using camels in the dry deserts of the Southwest. After successfully traveling round trip from Texas to California, the experiment failed, partly due to the problem that the Army's burros, horses, and mules feared the large animals, often panicking, and the tensions of the American Civil War led to Congress not approving more funds for the Corps. In 1864, the camels were finally auctioned off in Benicia, California, and Camp Verde, Texas. Ali was discharged from the Quartermaster Department of the U.S. Army at Fort McDowell in 1870.

Ali next ran a freight service between the Colorado River and the mining establishments further east, using the few camels he had purchased. His business was unsuccessful, however, and he released his camels into the desert near Gila Bend. He became an American citizen in 1880, and he used his birth name of Philip Tedro (sometimes spelled Teadrow) when he married Gertrudis Serna in Tucson, Arizona. They had two children. In 1885, Ali was again hired by the U.S. Army in Arizona, and worked with pack mules for Brig. Gen. George Crook during the Geronimo campaign.

Hi Jolly's work in the US Camel Corps earned him a reputation as a living legend until his death in Arizona.

In his final years, Ali moved to Quartzsite, Arizona, where he mined and occasionally scouted for the US government. He died in 1902 and was buried in the Quartzsite Cemetery.

== Gravesite and monument ==
In 1935, Arizona Governor Benjamin Moeur dedicated a monument to Hadji Ali and the Camel Corps in the Quartzsite Cemetery. The monument, located at his gravesite, is a pyramid built from local stones and topped with a copper camel, and is listed on the National Register of Historic Places. The monument is the most visited location in Quartzsite.

== Legacy ==
- The folk song "Hi Jolly" is based on Hadji Ali's exploits.
- The 1954 movie Southwest Passage, in which Hi Jolly was portrayed by Mark Hanna, and the 1976 movie Hawmps! in which he was portrayed by Gino Conforti, were based on the camel experiment.
- Portrayed in Death Valley Days TV series, 1957 Season 6 Episode 2 "Camel Train".
- The 1959 novel Hi Jolly by children's book author Jim Kjelgaard, also covers his story in a fictionalized form for young readers.
- A slightly fictionalized version of Hadji Ali appears in the 1982 Lucky Luke comic album La Corde du pendu.
- The 2018 children's book Route 66 by Frédéric Marais tells about the camel experiment and Hadji Ali.
- The 2019 novel Inland by Téa Obreht includes a character based on Hadji Ali.
- The 2017 movie Hi Jolly was directed by Matt Bremen.
