= National Register of Historic Places listings in La Paz County, Arizona =

Location of La Paz County in Arizona

This is a list of the National Register of Historic Places listings in La Paz County, Arizona.

This is intended to be a complete list of the properties and districts on the National Register of Historic Places in La Paz County, Arizona, United States. The locations of National Register properties and districts for which the latitude and longitude coordinates are included below, may be seen in a map.

There are 10 properties and districts listed on the National Register in the county.

This National Park Service list is complete through NPS recent listings posted April 24, 2026.

== Listings ==
	Name on the Register	Image	Date listed	Location	City or town	Description
1	Eagletail Petroglyph Site		September 28, 1988 (#88001570)	Address Restricted	Hyder	
2	Harquahala Mountain Smithsonian Solar Observatory Historic District		May 1, 1997 (#97000346)	Harquahala Mountain (Wilderness), southwest of Gladden; 33°48′48″N 113°20′47″W	Gladden	
3	Harquahala Peak Observatory	Harquahala Peak Observatory	October 3, 1975 (#75000370)	East of Wenden off U.S. Route 60; 33°48′44″N 113°20′49″W	Wenden	Astronomical observatory built in 1920 and operated for just a few years
4	Hi Jolly Monument	Hi Jolly Monument	February 28, 2011 (#11000054)	Intersection of W. Elsie and Hi Jolly Lanes. 33°39′52″N 114°14′11″W	Quartzsite	Pyramidal Monuments in Arizona MPS
5	Rhoda Nohlechek House		May 10, 1996 (#96000529)	Northwestern corner of the junction of 2nd St. and Date Ave. 33°49′24″N 113°32′27″W	Wenden	
6	Old La Paz		August 25, 1970 (#70000117)	Address Restricted	Ehrenberg	
7	Old Presbyterian Church	Old Presbyterian Church	June 3, 1971 (#71000122)	Southwest of Parker on 2nd Ave. 34°06′45″N 114°18′48″W	Parker vicinity	
8	Parker Jail	Parker Jail	April 3, 1975 (#75000369)	Northern side of Agency Rd. in Pop Harvey Park; 34°08′55″N 114°17′39″W	Parker	
9	Poston Elementary School, Unit 1, Colorado River Relocation Center	Poston Elementary School, Unit 1, Colorado River Relocation Center	October 16, 2012 (#12001010)	Poston Rd. 0.4 miles (0.64 km) west of Mohave Rd. 33°59′40″N 114°24′24″W	Poston	Elementary school at Poston War Relocation Center
10	Ripley Intaglios		November 20, 1975 (#75000368)	Address Restricted	Ehrenberg	

== See also ==
- List of National Historic Landmarks in Arizona
- National Register of Historic Places listings in Arizona
