= List of historic properties in Parker, Arizona =

- Town
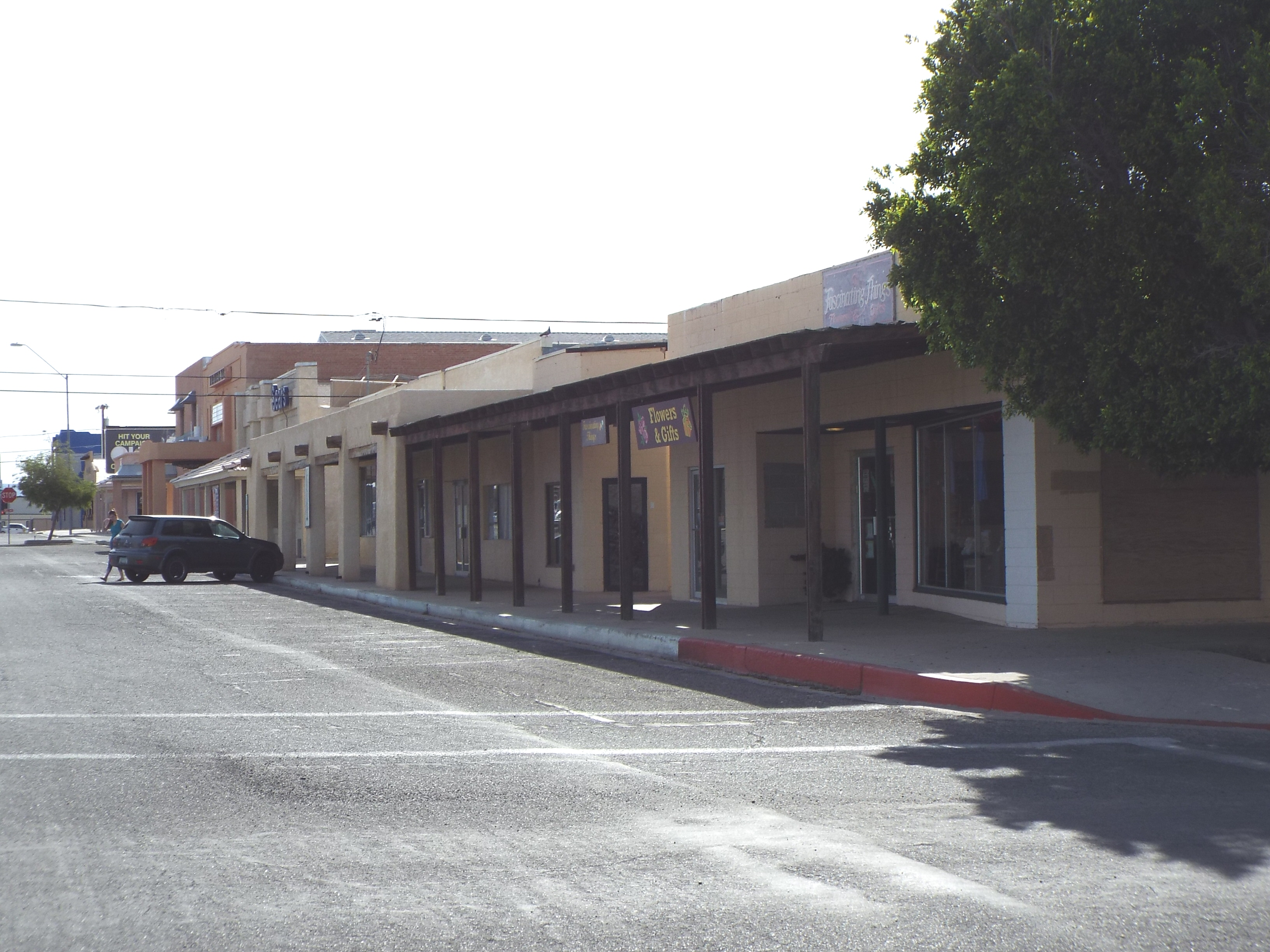
- Downtown historic Parker

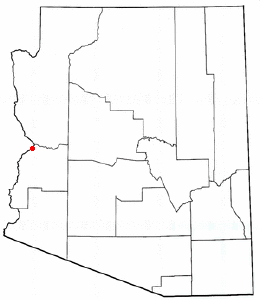
- Location of Parker in La Paz County, Arizona.

This is a list, which includes a photographic gallery, of some of the remaining structures and monuments, of historic significance in Parker, a town in La Paz County, Arizona. Parker is the county seat of La Paz County, Arizona, United States. on the Colorado River in Parker Valley.

== History ==
The Native-American tribes of the Mohave, Chemehuevis, Navajos and Hopi lived in the area of La Paz before the arrival of the European settlers from the east coast of the United States.

On February 2, 1848, the Treaty of Guadalupe Hidalgo was signed that ended the war between the United States and the Mexican Republic in which 525,000 square miles were ceded to the United States, including parts of present-day Arizona, California, Colorado, Nevada, New Mexico, Texas, and Utah.

On March 3, 1865, the United States proceeded to establish a reservation for all the Native Americans living along the Colorado River, in what then was known as the Arizona Territory, by an act of Congress which was approved by President Abraham Lincoln.

The United States Army established a place in the area to land and pick up cargo and personnel. The Army had a detachment that was stationed there at Camp Colorado from 1864 to 1869 during the first years of the establishment of the Colorado River Indian Reservation. The landing was named "Parker's Landing" after Ely Parker, the first Native American commissioner for the U.S. government. The Parker Post Office was established on January 6, 1871, at Parker's Landing.

In 1909, Earl. H. Parker (no relation to Ely Parker), a railroad location engineer, surveyed and laid out the original town site for the Arizona & California Railway. The Town of Parker was officially incorporated as a town in 1948.

== The Parker Area Historical Society ==
The Parker Area Historical Society, founded in 1972, operates the Parker Area Historical Society Museum whose mission is to collect, preserve, interpret, and present the culturally diverse history and human experience unique to Parker and the surrounding area. It is located at 1214 California Ave.

Two of the historic properties are listed in the National Register of Historic Places. They are the Old Parker Jail NRHP reference #75000369 and the Old Presbyterian Church NRHP reference #71000122.

== Historic properties ==
The following is a brief description and images of the historic properties that are pictured.:

- The Old Parker Jail – The jail was built in 1914 and is located in Pop Harvey City Park. It was listed on the National Register of Historic Places on April 3, 1975, Reference #75000369.
- The Old Presbyterian Church – The church a.k.a. Mojave Indian Presbyterian Mission Church, located on the South West corner of 2nd Ave. south of the city, was built in 1917. It was listed in the National Register of Historic Places on June 3, 1971, Reference #71000122.
- The Old Presbyterian Church School – The school was built around the same time as the church and is located on the same grounds as the church south of town.
- Old Parker High School – The high school was built in 1930.
- The Arizona and California Railroad Bridge – The bridge a.k.a. “The Colorado River Bridge” was built in 1908. In September 2019, a fire, believed to have been started by arsonists, burned the southern end of the bridge (the Arizona side) near the entrance to BlueWater Lagoon. The bridge deck and pilings were both burned, and vegetation along the banks of the Colorado River was burned as well.
- The Trestles of the Arizona and California Railroad Bridge. The original trestles were burned during the fire of September 2019.
- The Arizona and California Railroad Station – The station was built in 1908.
- The Arizona and California Railroad Storage Depot – The building used by the railroad for storage.
- The Parker Dam – The construction of the dam began in 1924 and was completed in 1928.

== Historic structures pictured ==
The following are the images of the historic structures in Parker and its surrounding areas.

Historic structures in Parker

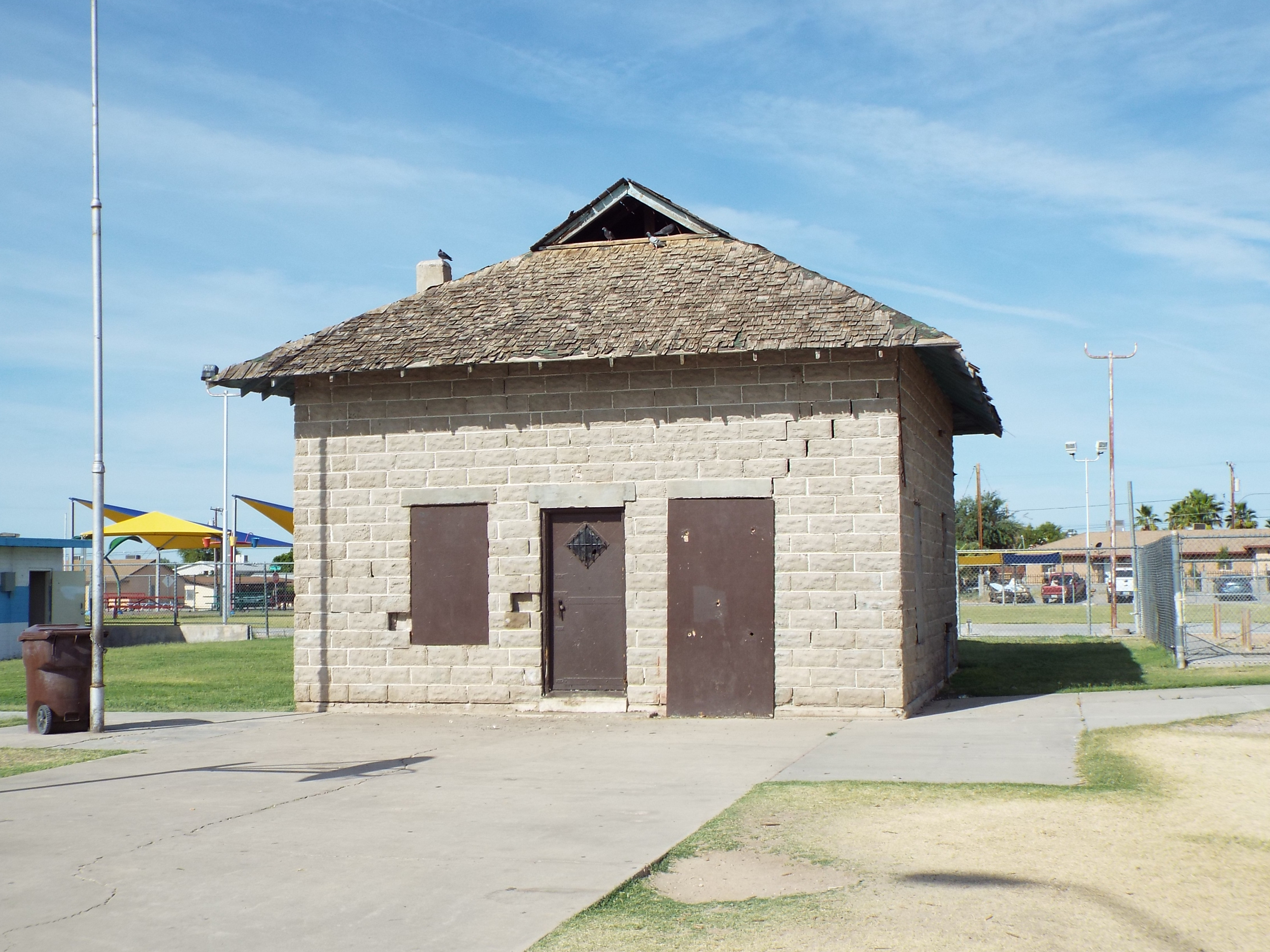
The Old Parker Jail

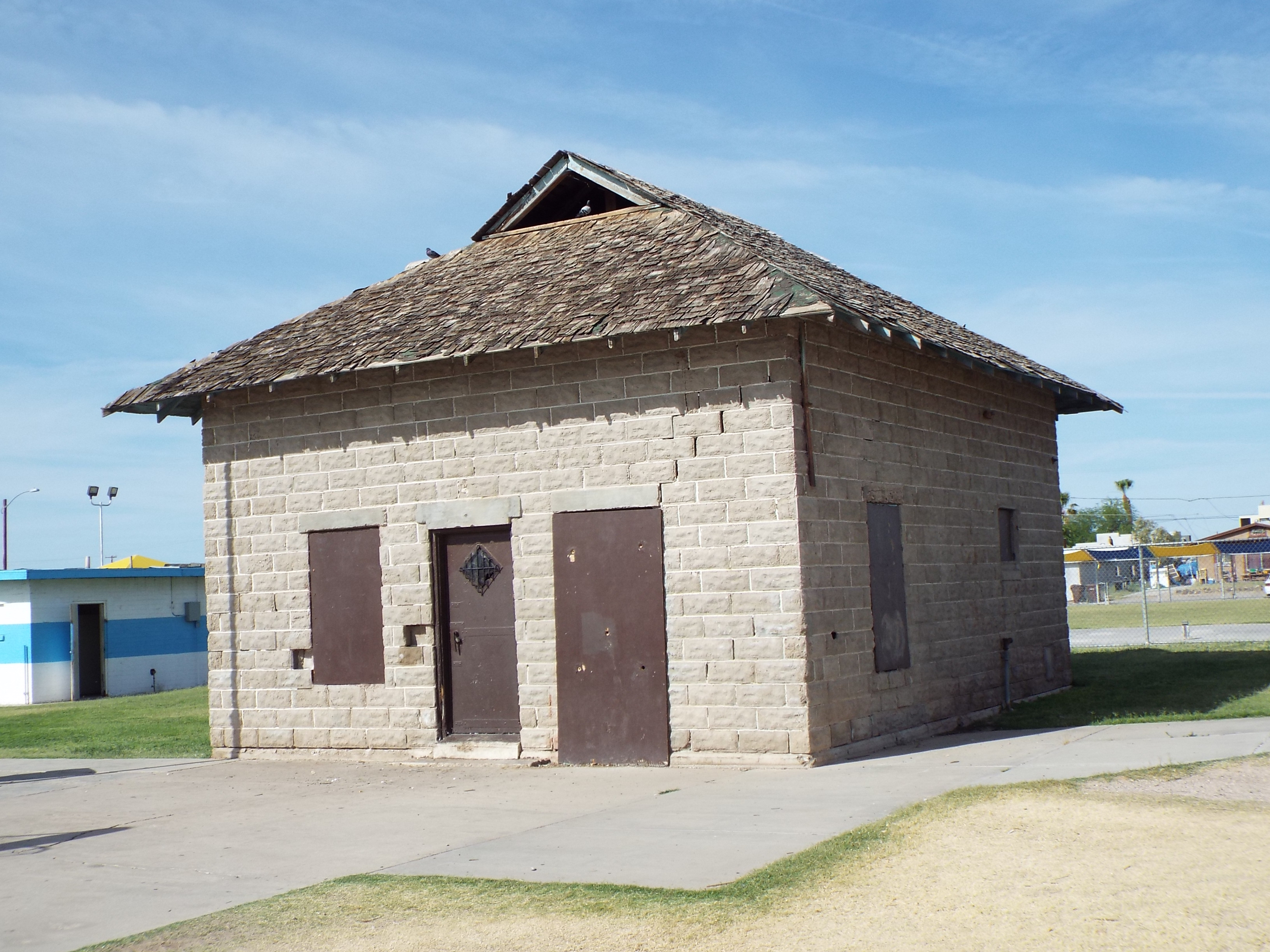
The Old Parker Jail viewed from a different angle

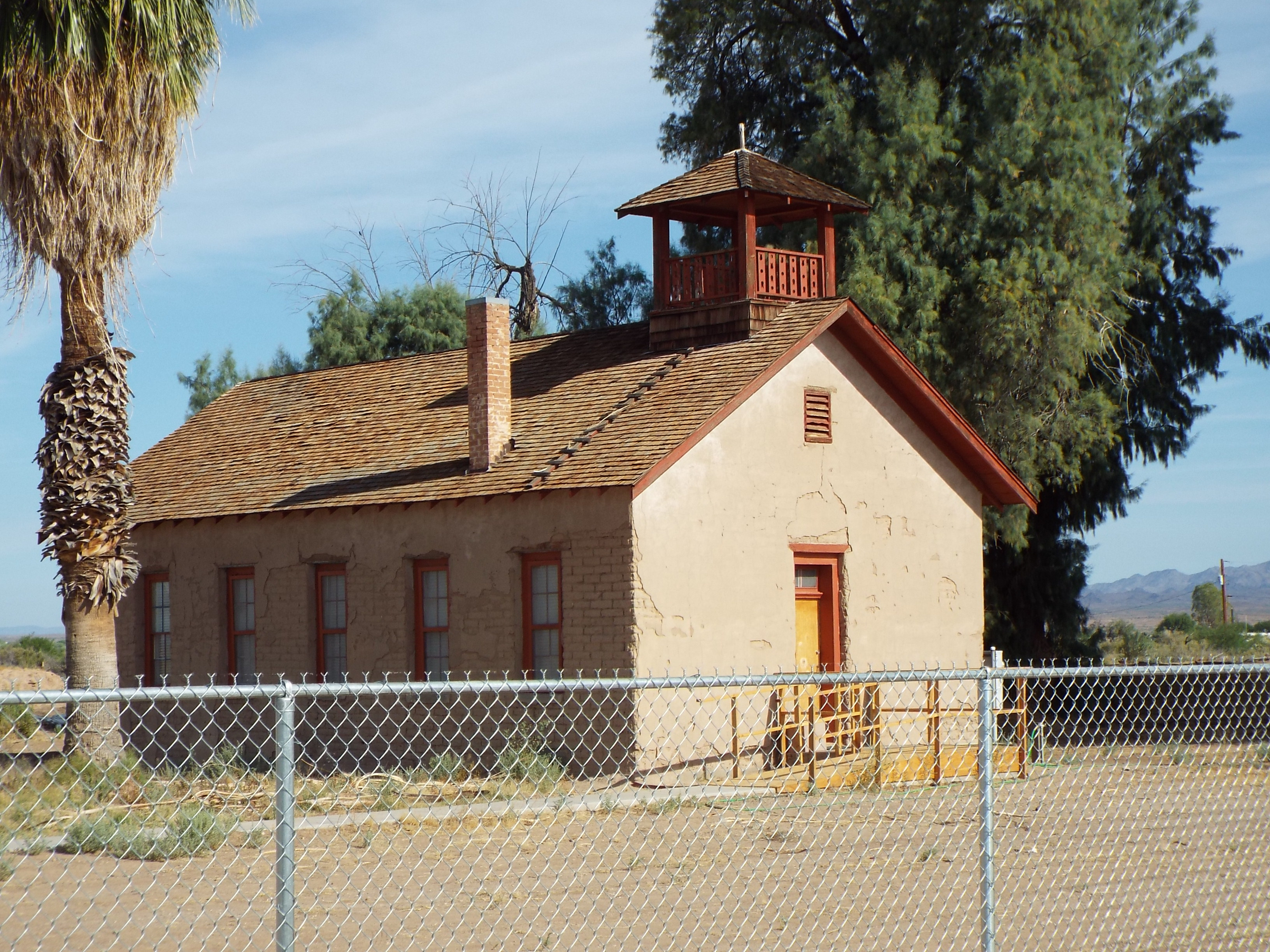
The Old Presbyterian Church a.k.a. Mojave Indian Presbyterian Mission Church

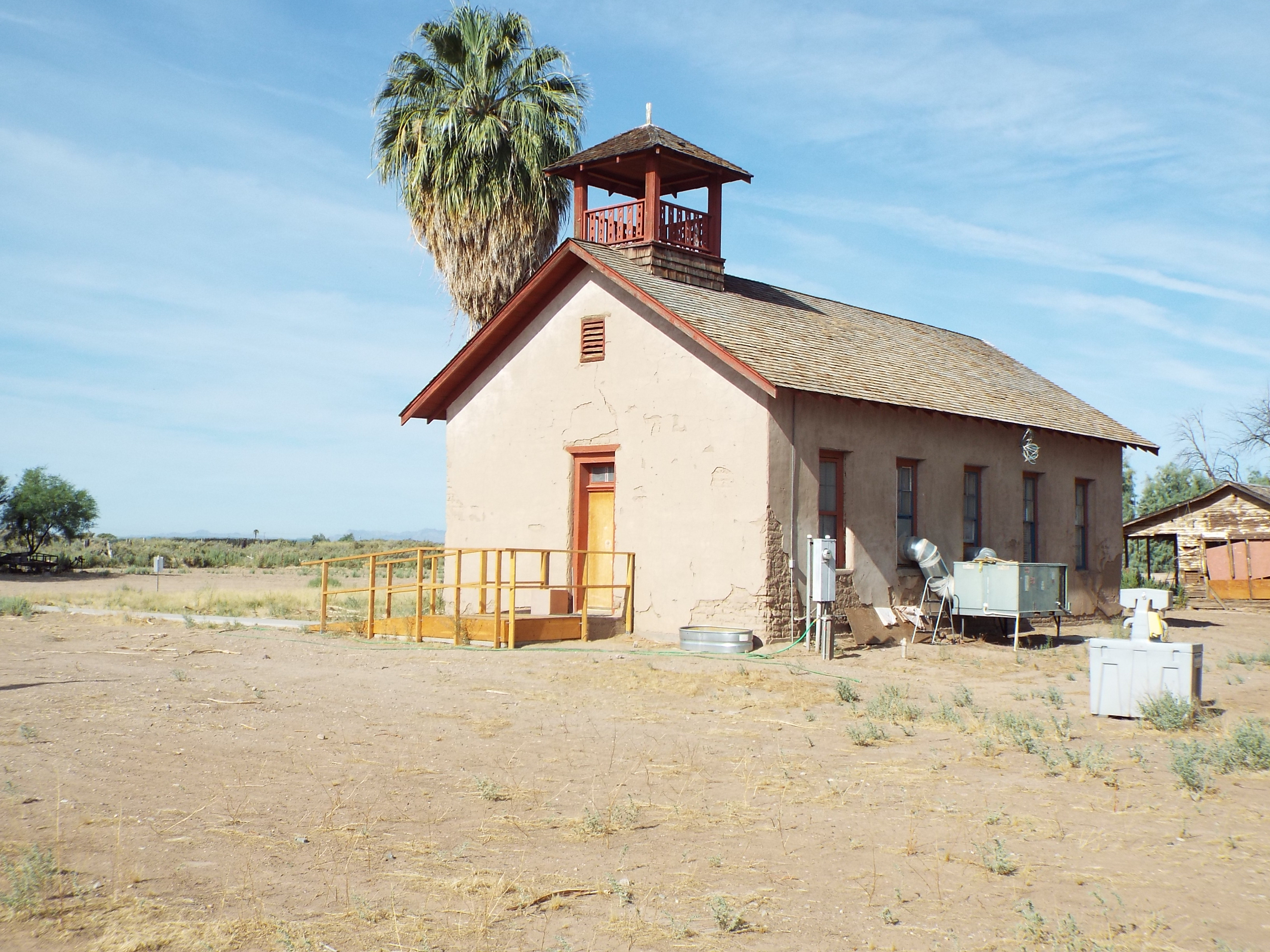
The Old Presbyterian Church as viewed from a different angle

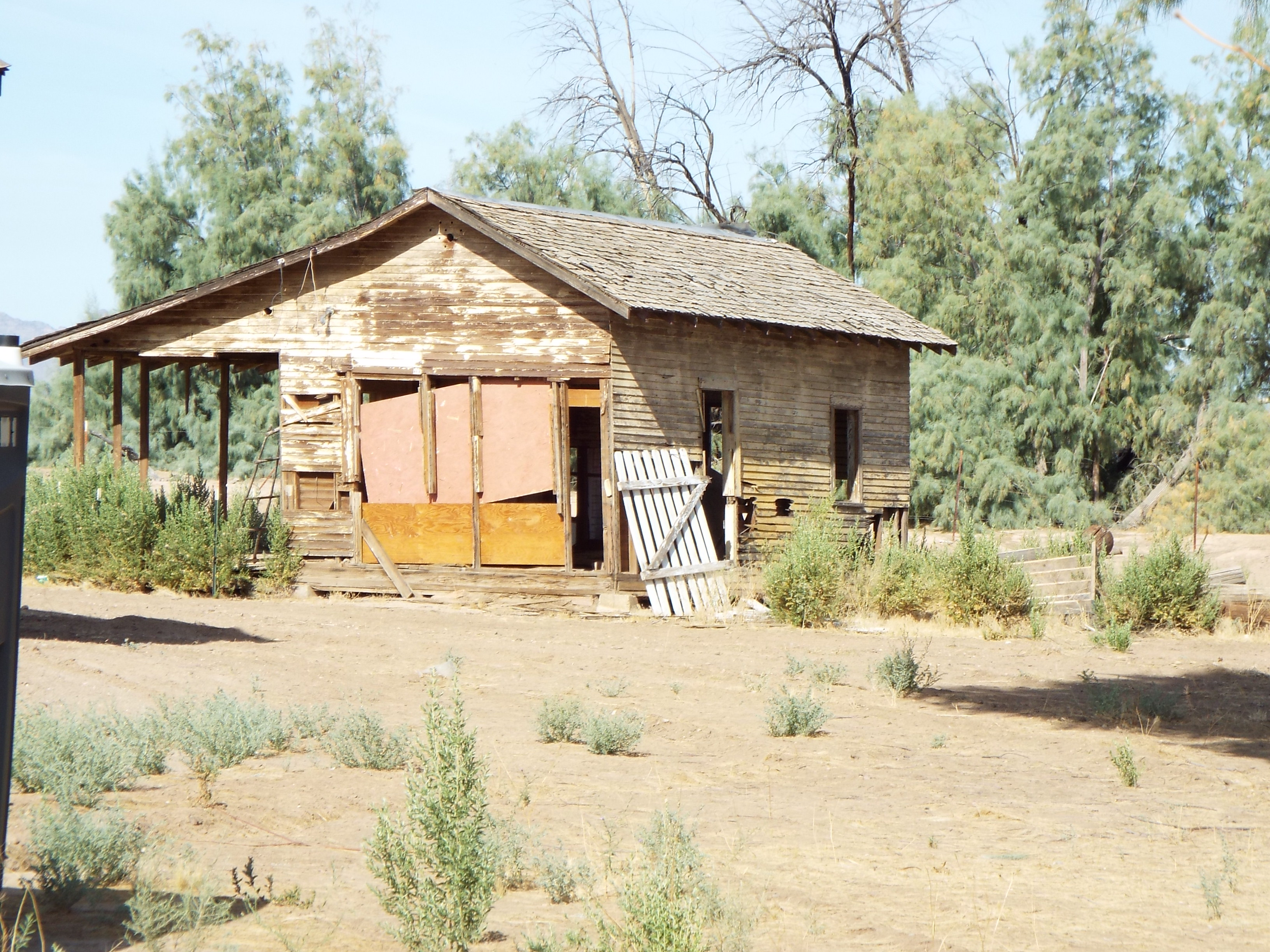
The Old Presbyterian Church School

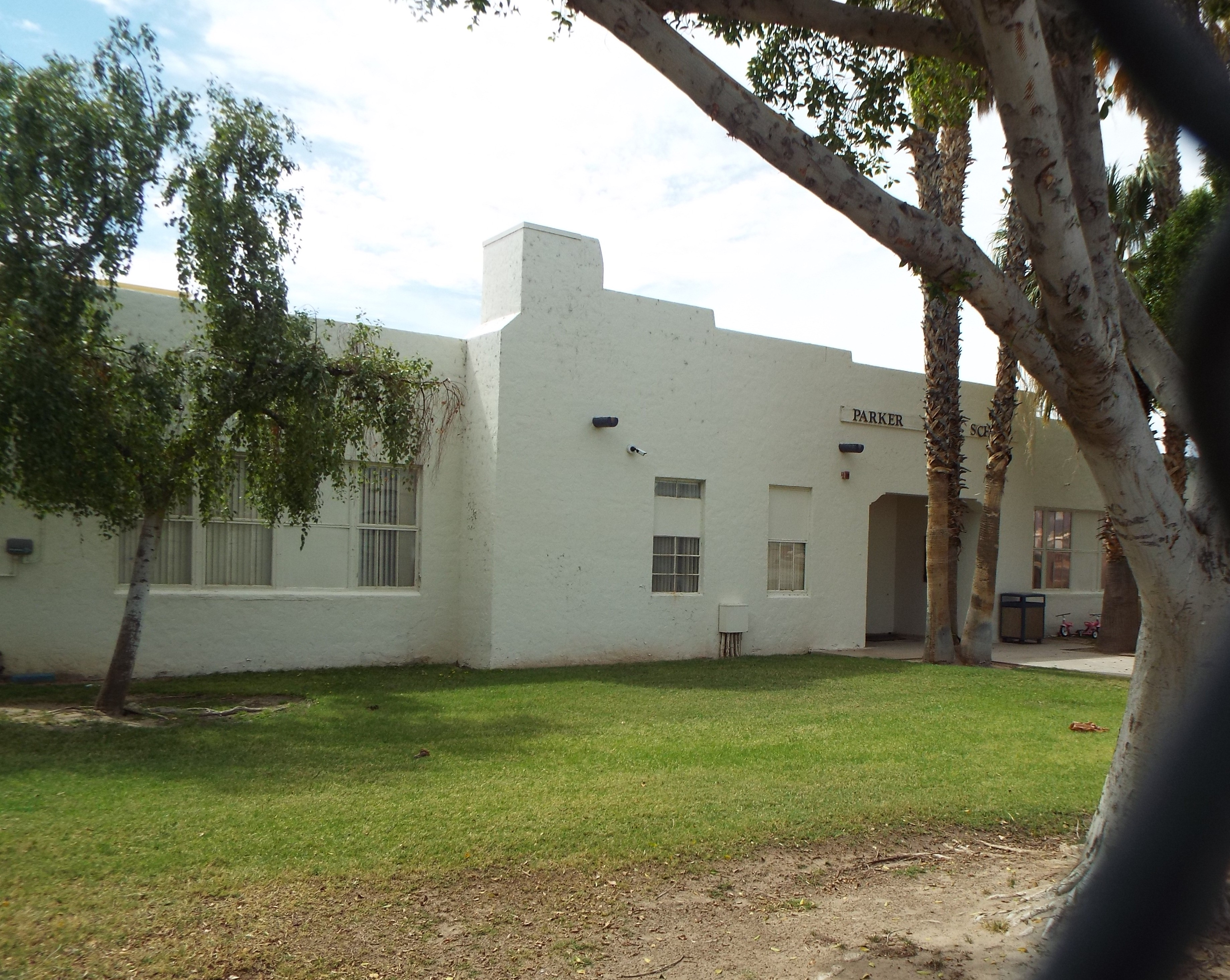
Old Parker High School

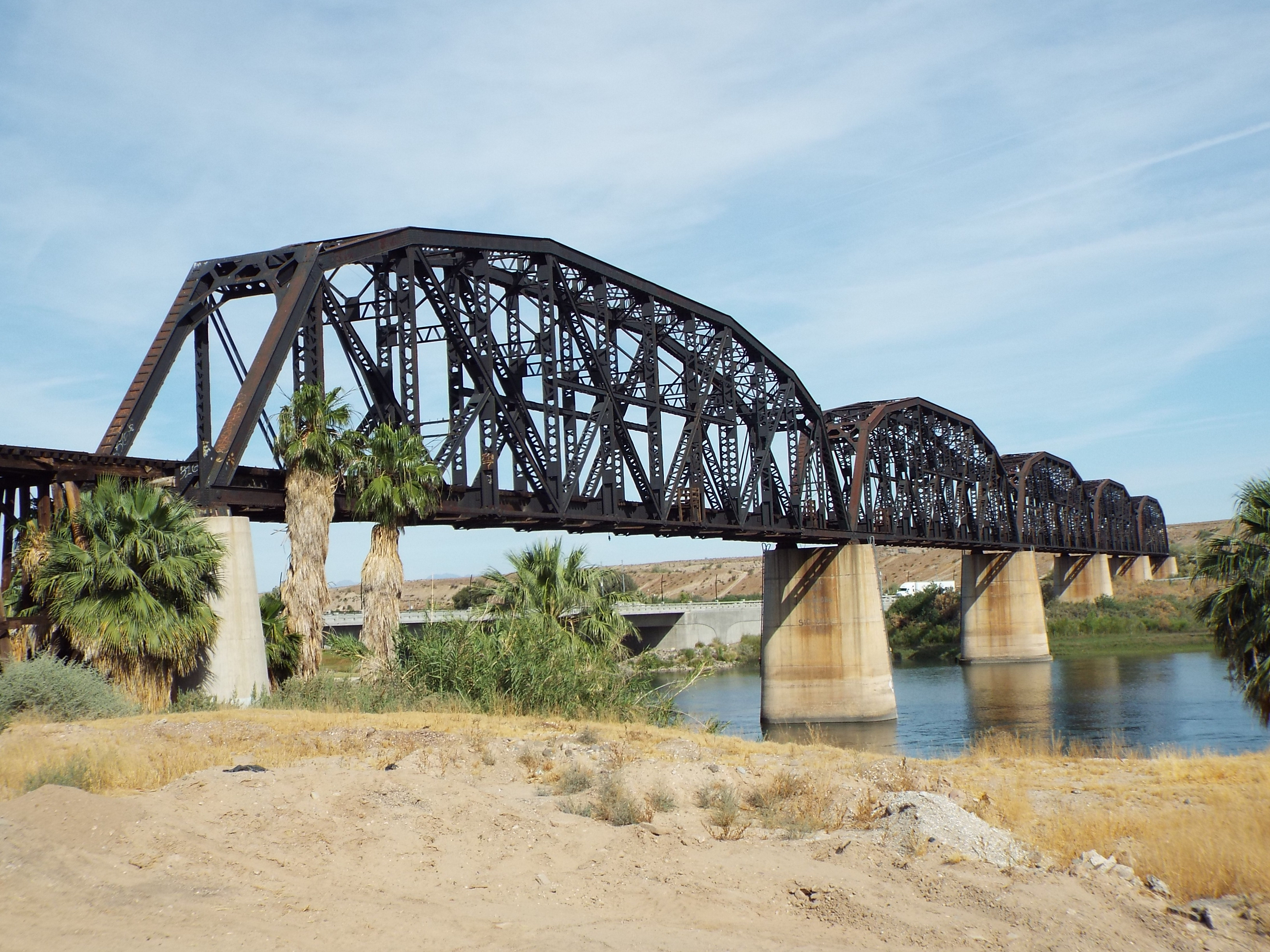
The Arizona and California Railroad Bridge a.k.a. “The Colorado River Bridge”

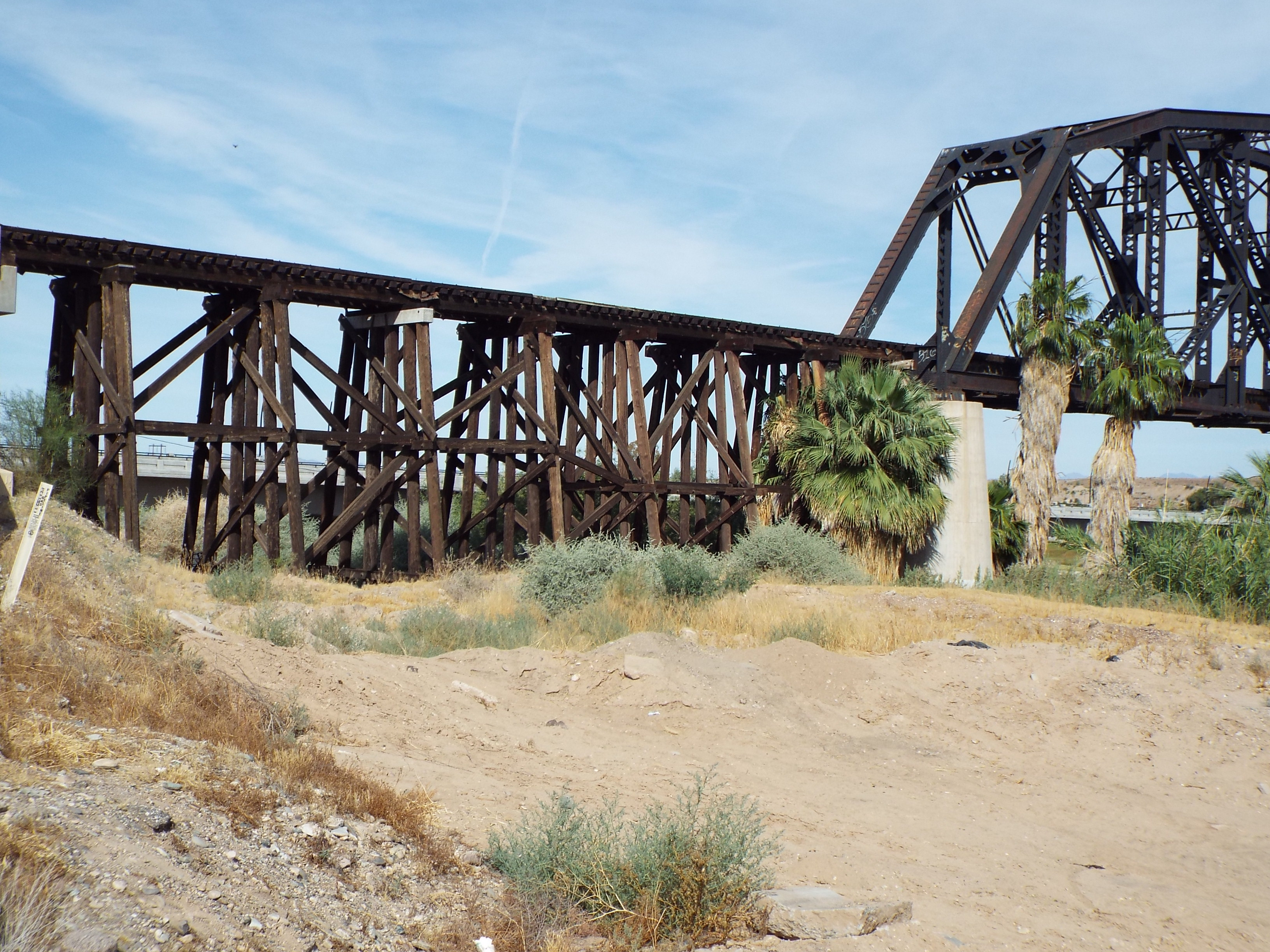
The Trestle of the Arizona and California Railroad Bridge

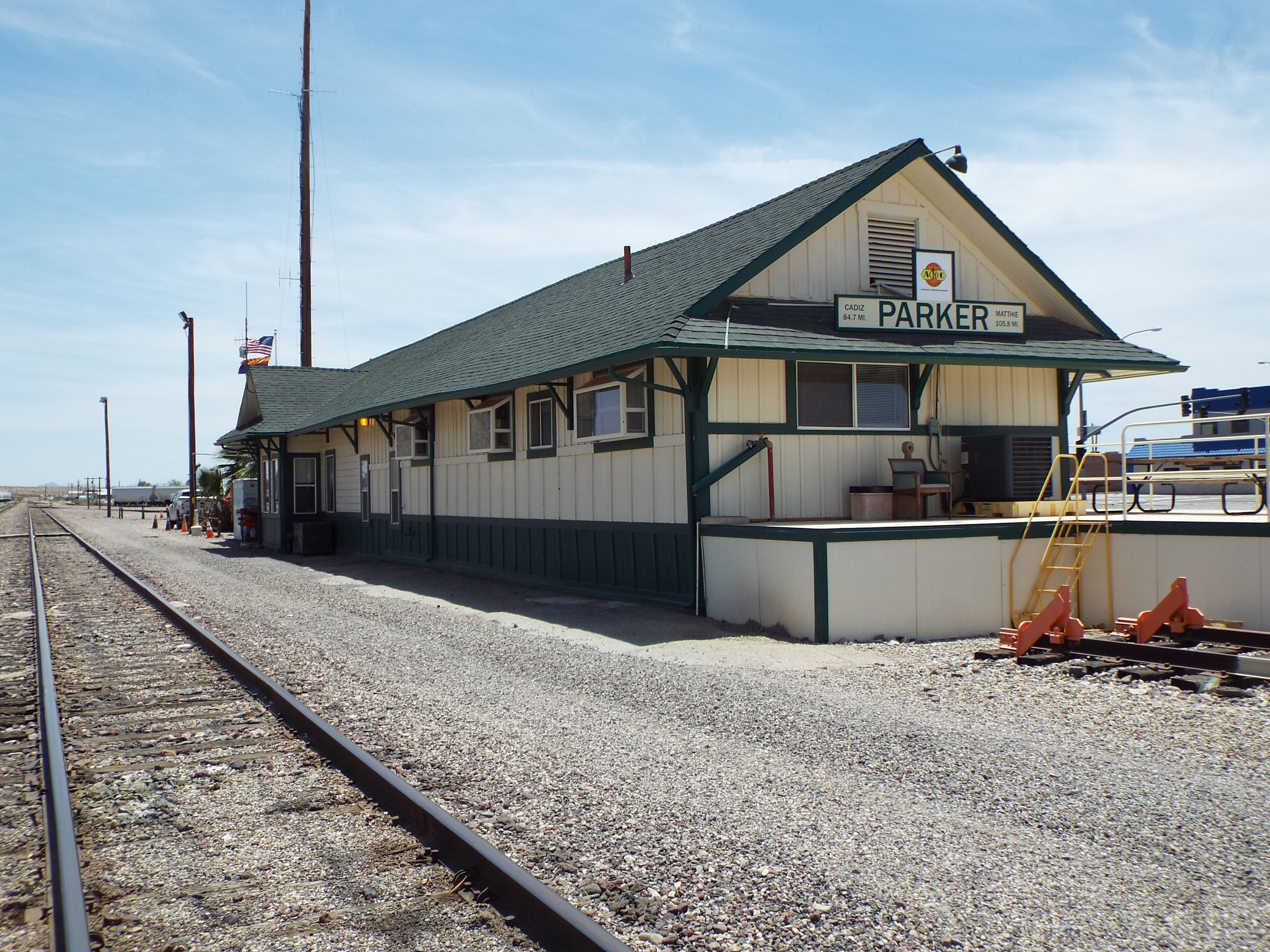
The Arizona and California Railroad Station

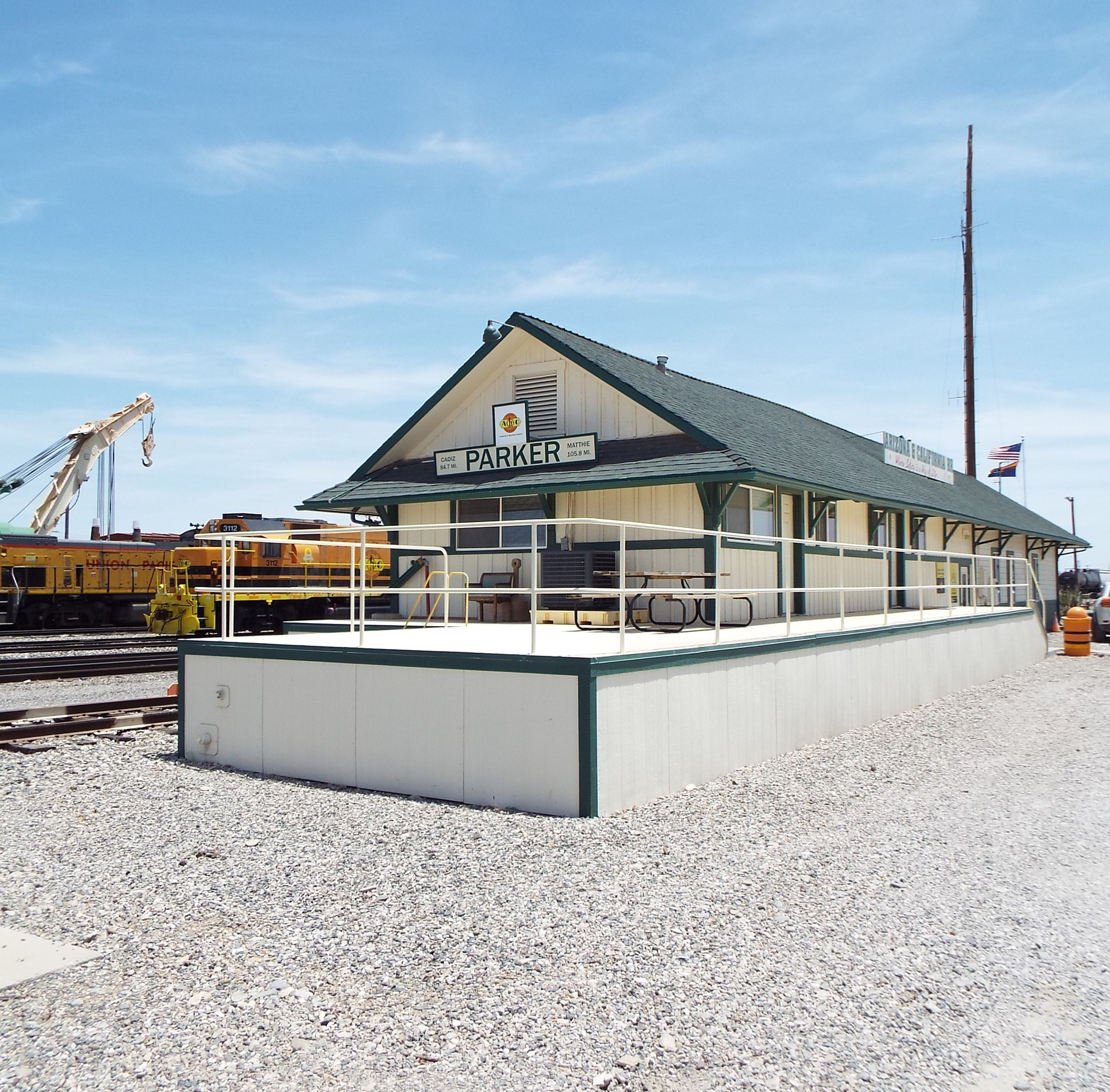
The Arizona and California Railroad Station viewed from a different angle

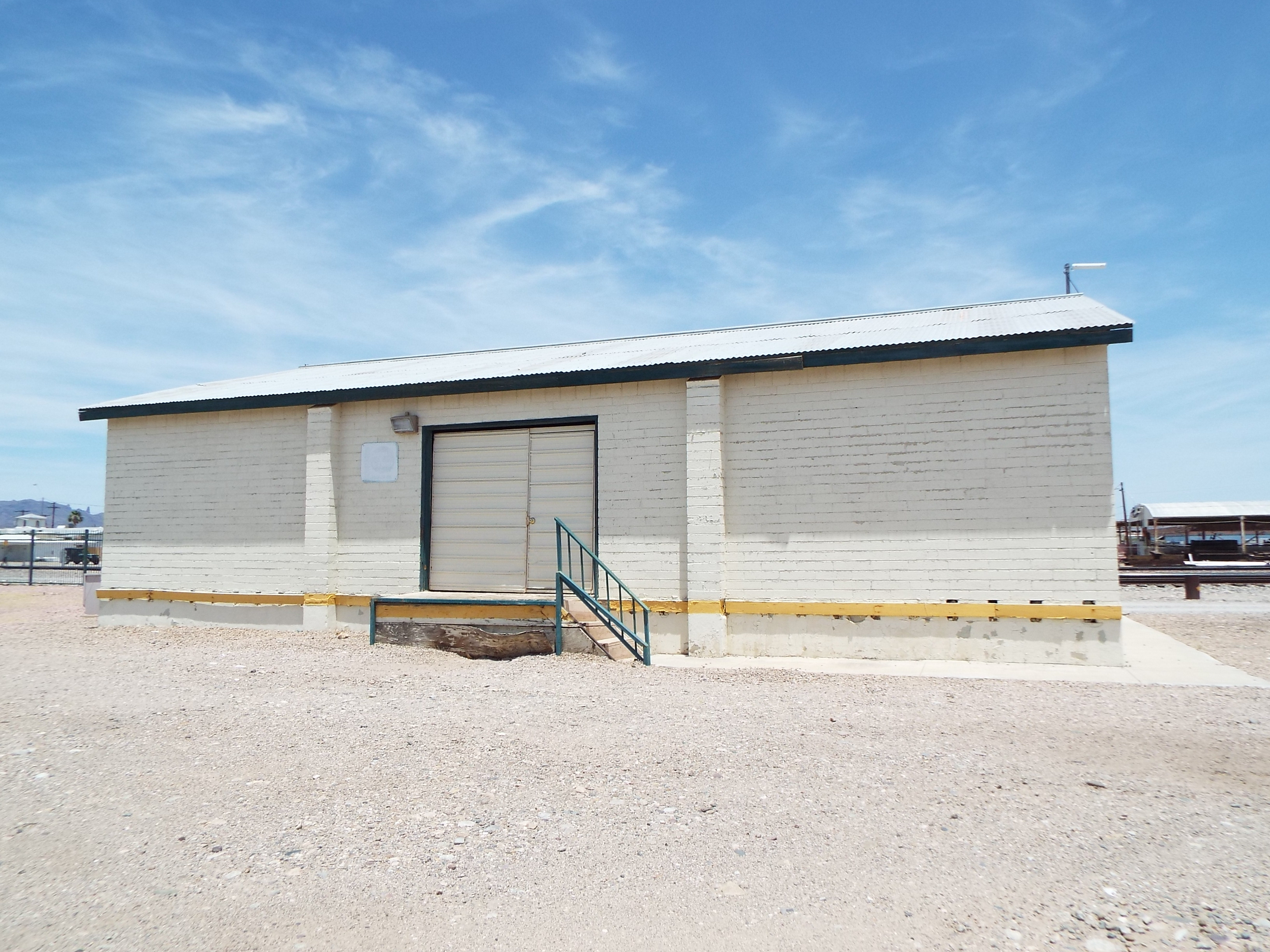
The Arizona and California Railroad Station Storage-Depot

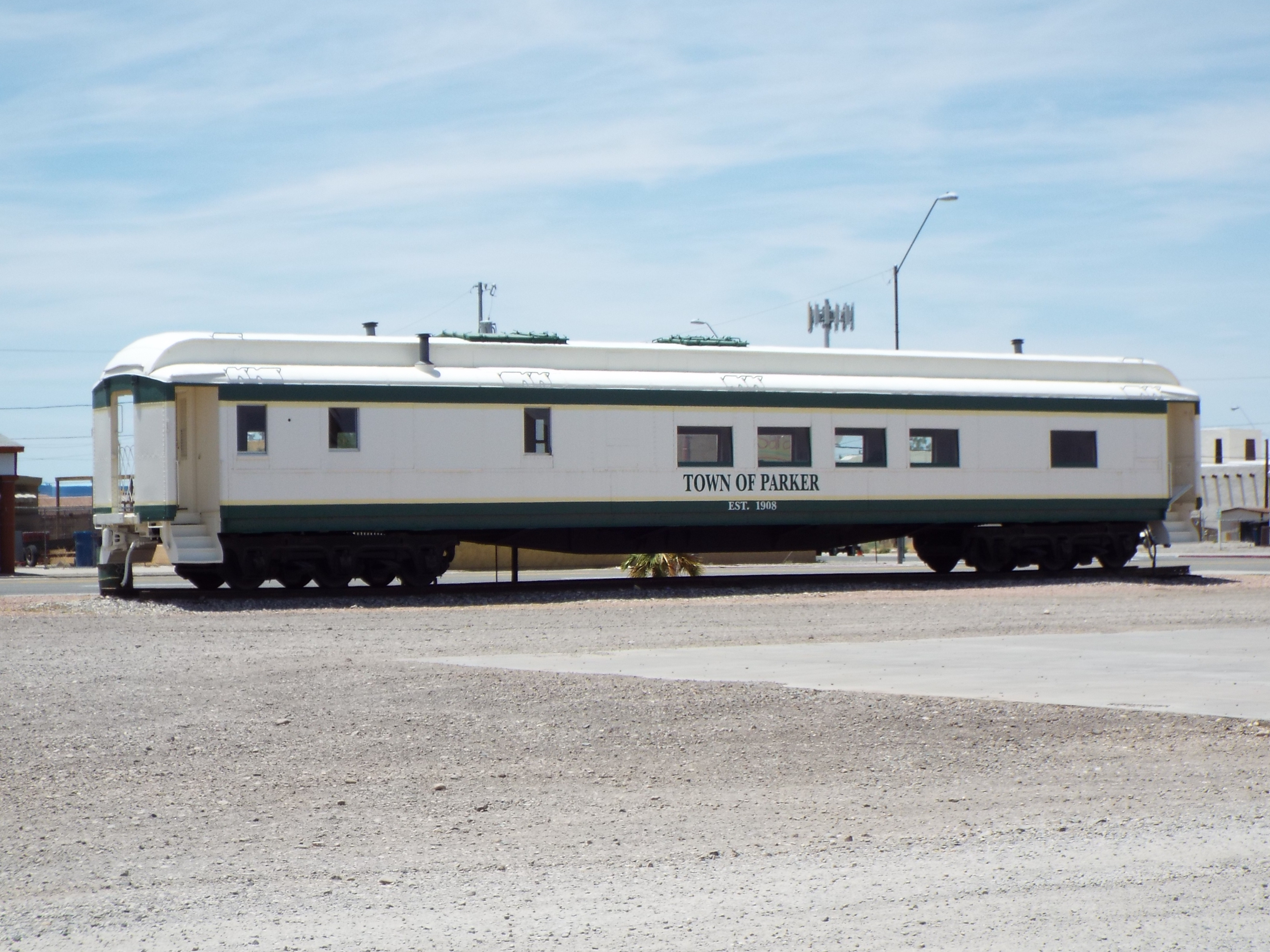
Town of Parker railroad car

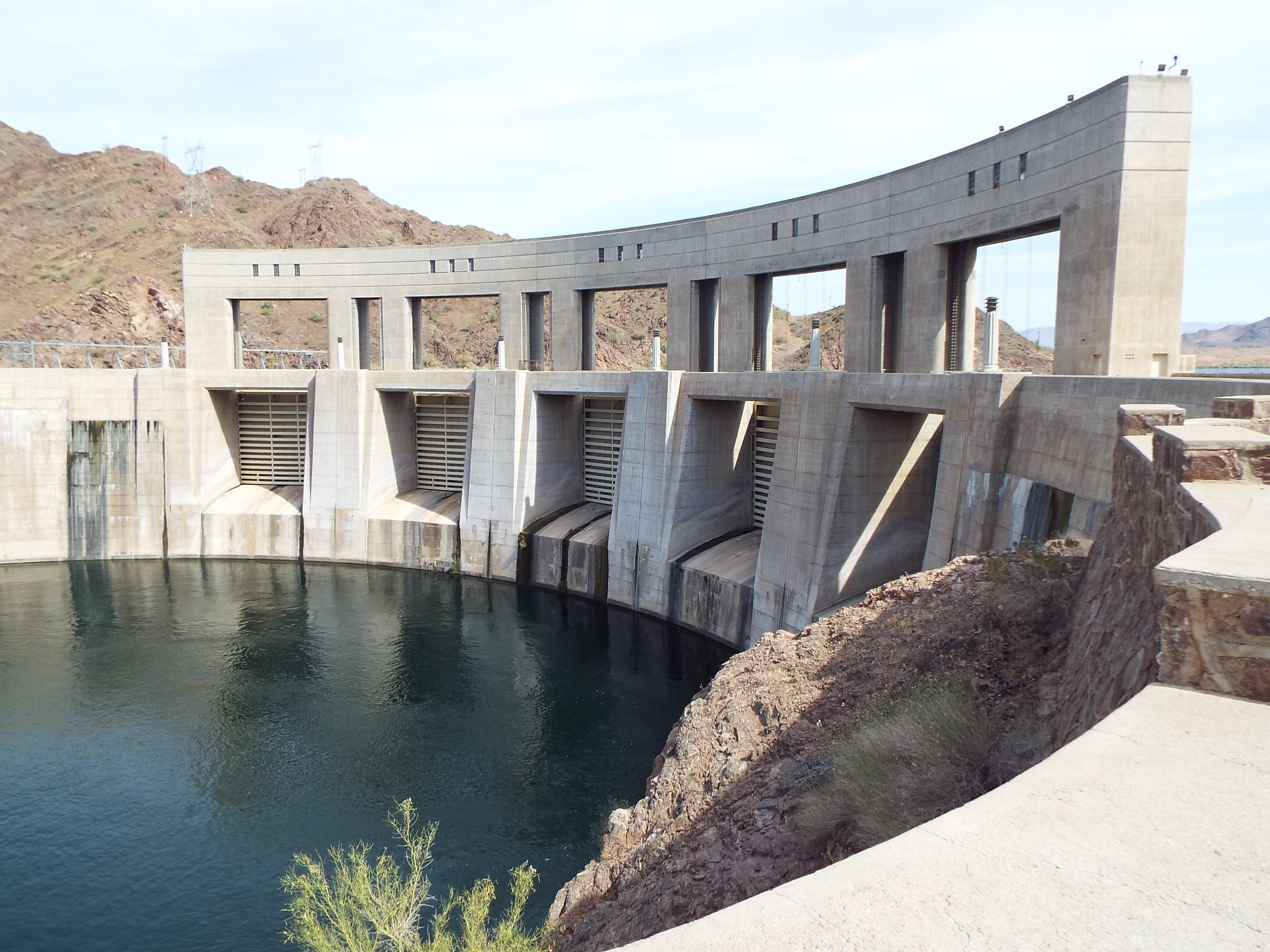
The Parker Dam as viewed from Arizona

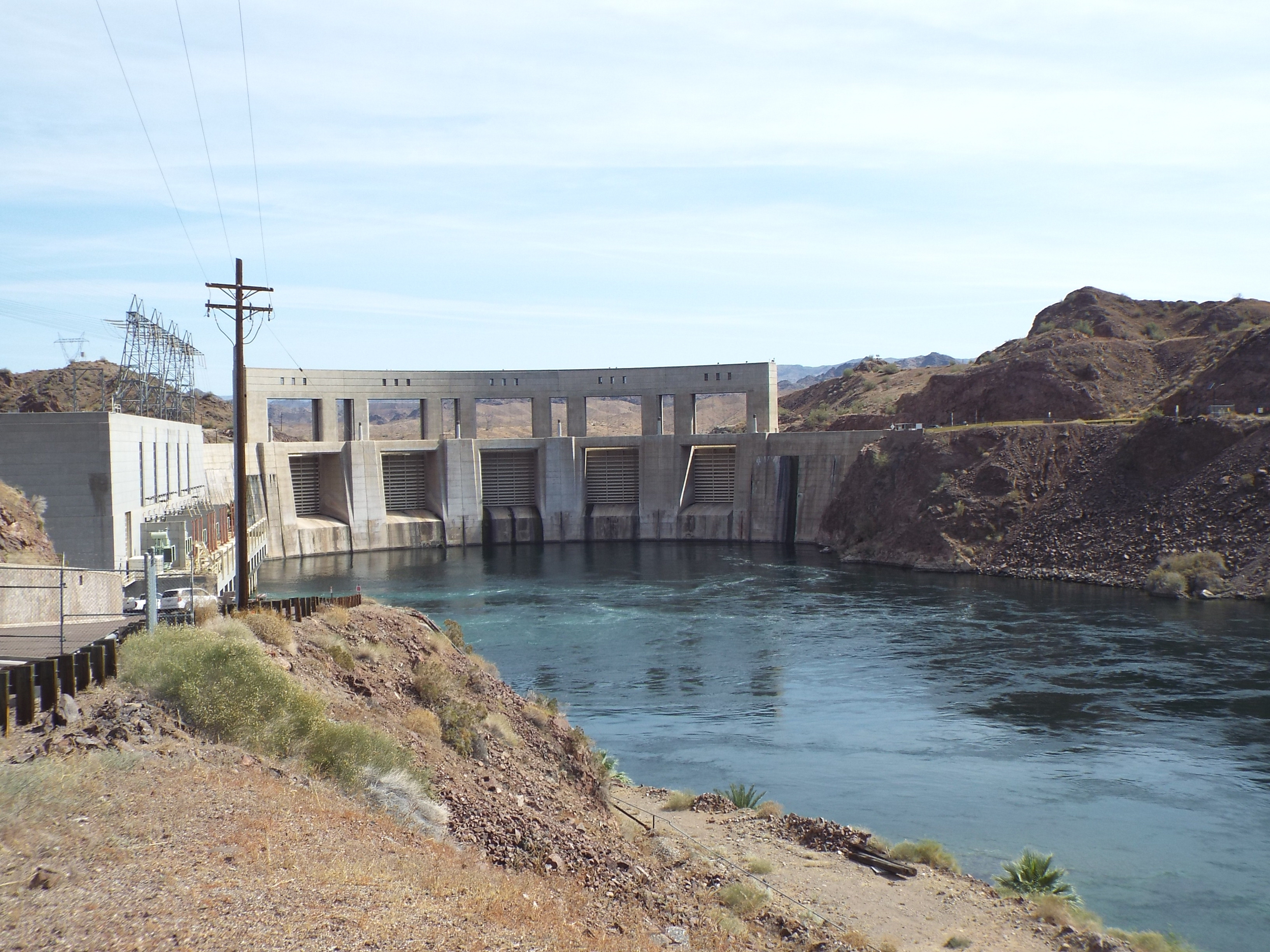
The Parker Dam as viewed from California

== See also ==
- National Register of Historic Places listings in La Paz County, Arizona
