= Poston Elementary School, Unit 1, Colorado River Relocation Center =

- U.S. National Register of Historic Places
- U.S. National Historic Landmark District
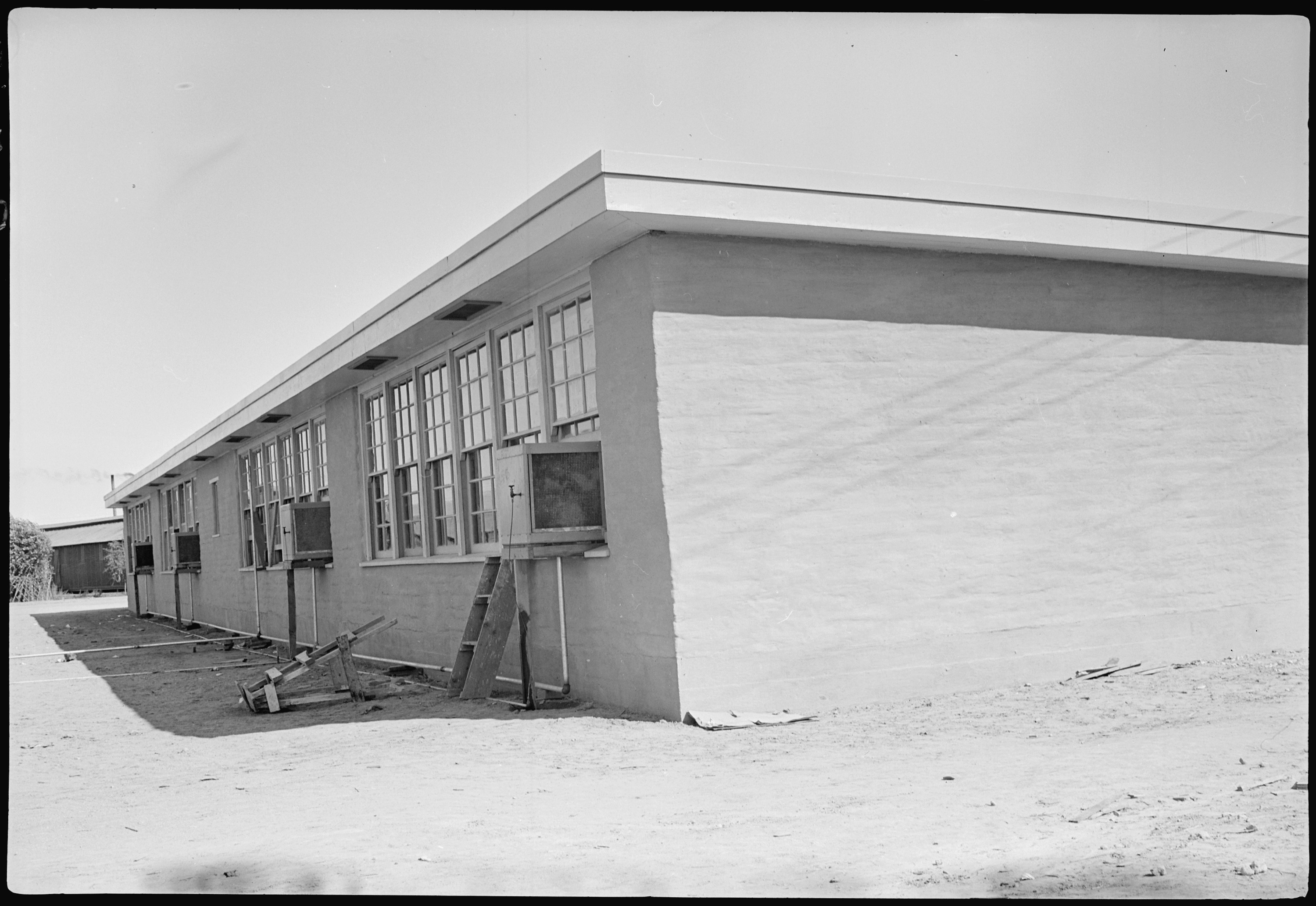
- 1943 photo
- Location: Poston Road, former site of Poston War Relocation Center, Poston, Arizona
- Area: 22 acres (8.9 ha)
- Built: 1943
- Architectural style: Adobe
- NRHP reference No.: 12001010

Significant dates
- Added to NRHP: October 16, 2012
- Designated NHLD: October 16, 2012

The Poston Elementary School, Unit 1, Colorado River Relocation Center is a historic complex of school buildings in Poston, Arizona. This nationally significant complex was built in the 1940s on the grounds of the Poston War Relocation Center, a Japanese-American internment camp operated by the Office of Indian Affairs of the United States government during World War II. The complex is the only surviving school built in one of the ten camps, and it was designed and built by Japanese-American internees living at the camp. It was designated a National Historic Landmark District in 2012.

== Description and history ==
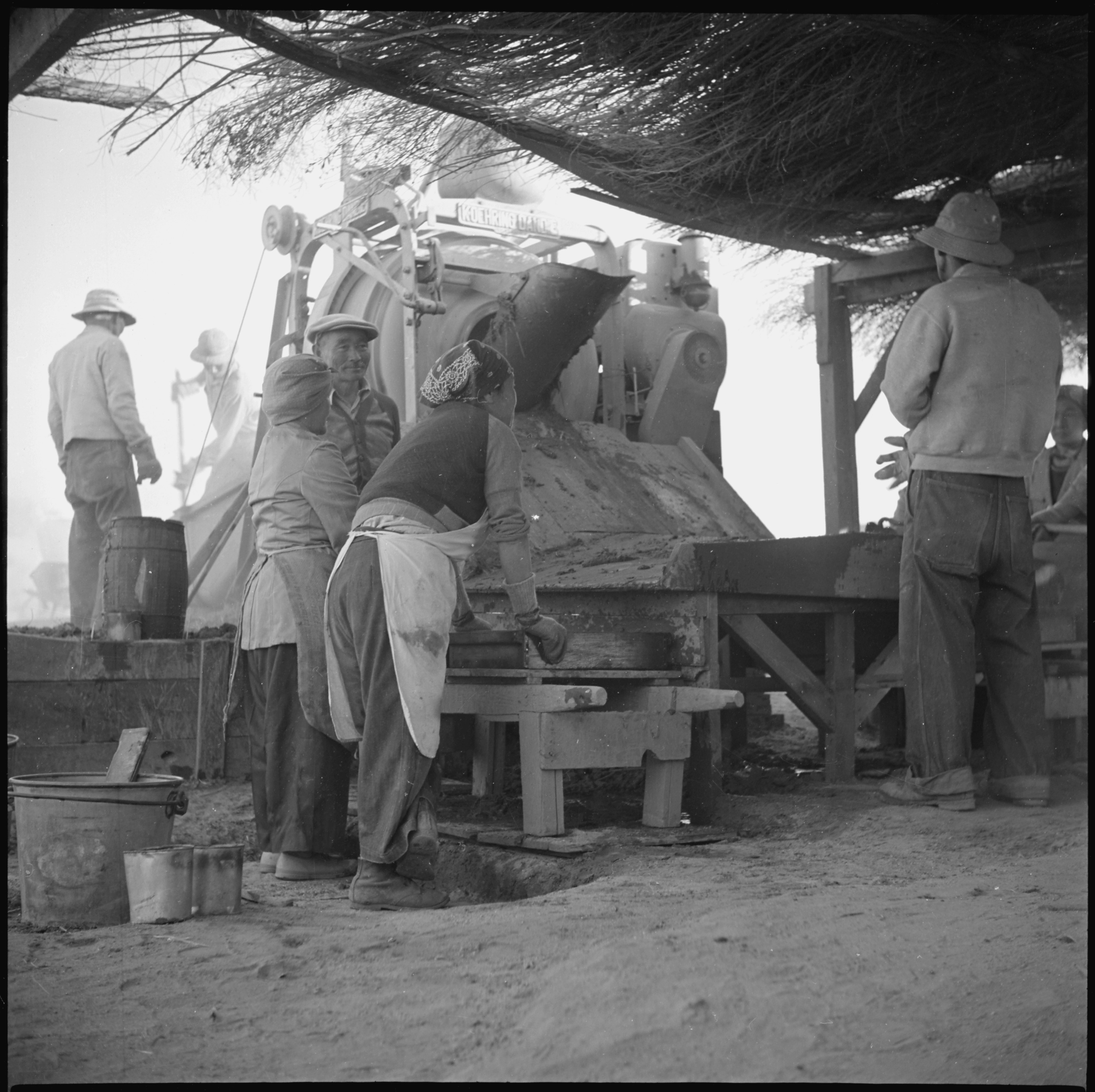
Workers creating adobe blocks for Poston Elementary School

The former Poston Elementary School complex is located on the Colorado River Indian Reservation in southwestern Arizona, southwest of Parker, on the north side of Poston Road west of Mohave Road. During World War II, this area was the site of Unit 1 of the Poston War Relocation Center, one of the largest Japanese-American internment camps to operate during the war years. The school complex is in a roughly rectangular area bounded on the south by Poston Road, and on the other sides by the remains of irrigation ditches that were also the product of camp labor. The school consists of a series of single-story buildings, built out of adobe blocks and covered with flat roofs. Most of them served as general-purpose classrooms; other surviving buildings include a woodcraft shop, library, and portions of the auditorium, which was significantly damaged by fire in 2001.

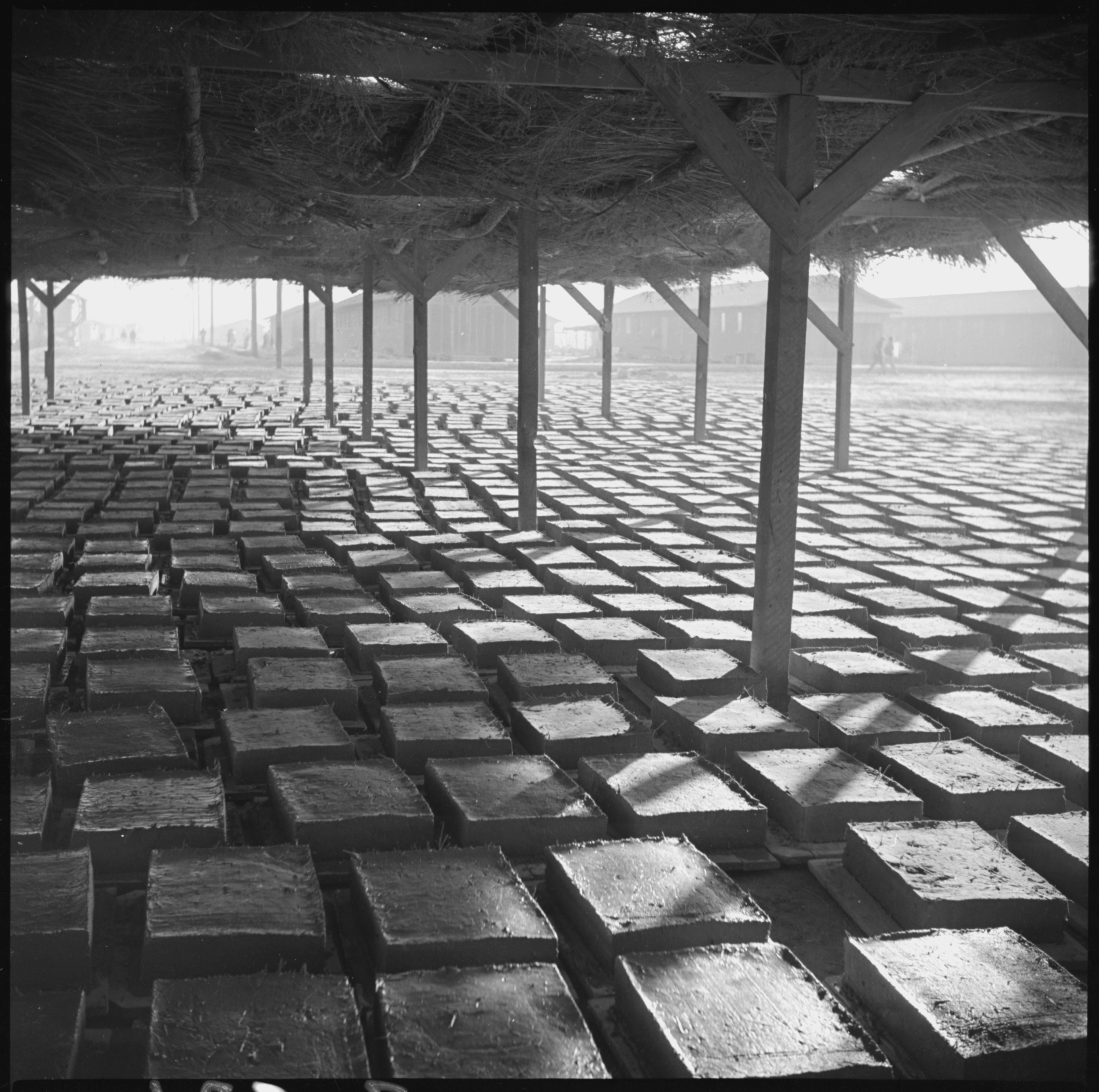
Adobe blocks in drying racks at Poston War Relocation Center

The Poston Camp was established after the United States entered into World War II, in response to widespread (and unfounded racist) fears that Americans of Japanese descent posed a risk to the war effort, particularly in the western United States. Most of the Poston camp infrastructure was erected in great haste by contractors in early 1942, and evacuees began arriving in May of that year. Construction of the school was organized by the camp administration, largely in response to concerns raised by the evacuees over the lack of such educational facilities. The school buildings were designed by Yoshisaku Hirose, a naturalized Japanese immigrant, and an evacuee, and they were built largely out of locally available materials by camp residents. The building walls are fashioned out of adobe blocks 12 by 18 by 4 inches (0.30 m × 0.46 m × 0.10 m) in size, and finished on the outside with a layer of adobe plaster. Poston was the only one of the ten internment camps at which schools of this type were built in this way, and this is the only internment camp school complex to survive today. Most of the other internment camp buildings at Poston (and indeed at many other camps) have long since been demolished.

== See also ==
- Bibliography of the Japanese American Internment during World War II
- Outline of Japanese American Internment during World War II
- List of National Historic Landmarks in Arizona
- National Register of Historic Places listings in La Paz County, Arizona
