= Rhoda Nohlechek House =

- U.S. National Register of Historic Places
- Location within Arizona
- Location: Jct. of 2nd St. and Date Ave., NW corner, Wenden, Arizona
- Coordinates: 33°49′24″N 113°32′27″W
- Area: less than one acre
- Built: 1911, 1914
- Built by: Bray, George; Nohlechek, Rhoda
- NRHP reference No.: 96000529
- Added to NRHP: May 10, 1996

The Rhoda Nohlechek House in Wenden, Arizona was built in 1911. It was listed on the National Register of Historic Places in 1996.

Its original 20 by 22 feet (6.1 m × 6.7 m) wood portion was built in 1911 by gold prospector George Bray, who was murdered shortly after establishing a rich gold deposit claim. Rhoda Nohlechek acquired the mining claim and also Bray's house.

The house is located at the northwestern corner of 2nd St. and Date Ave.

The listing included a second contributing building, a barn built around 1914, and it included a contributing structure, a 6 by 6 feet (1.8 m × 1.8 m) smokehouse also built around 1914.
