= Harquahala Peak Observatory =

- U.S. National Register of Historic Places
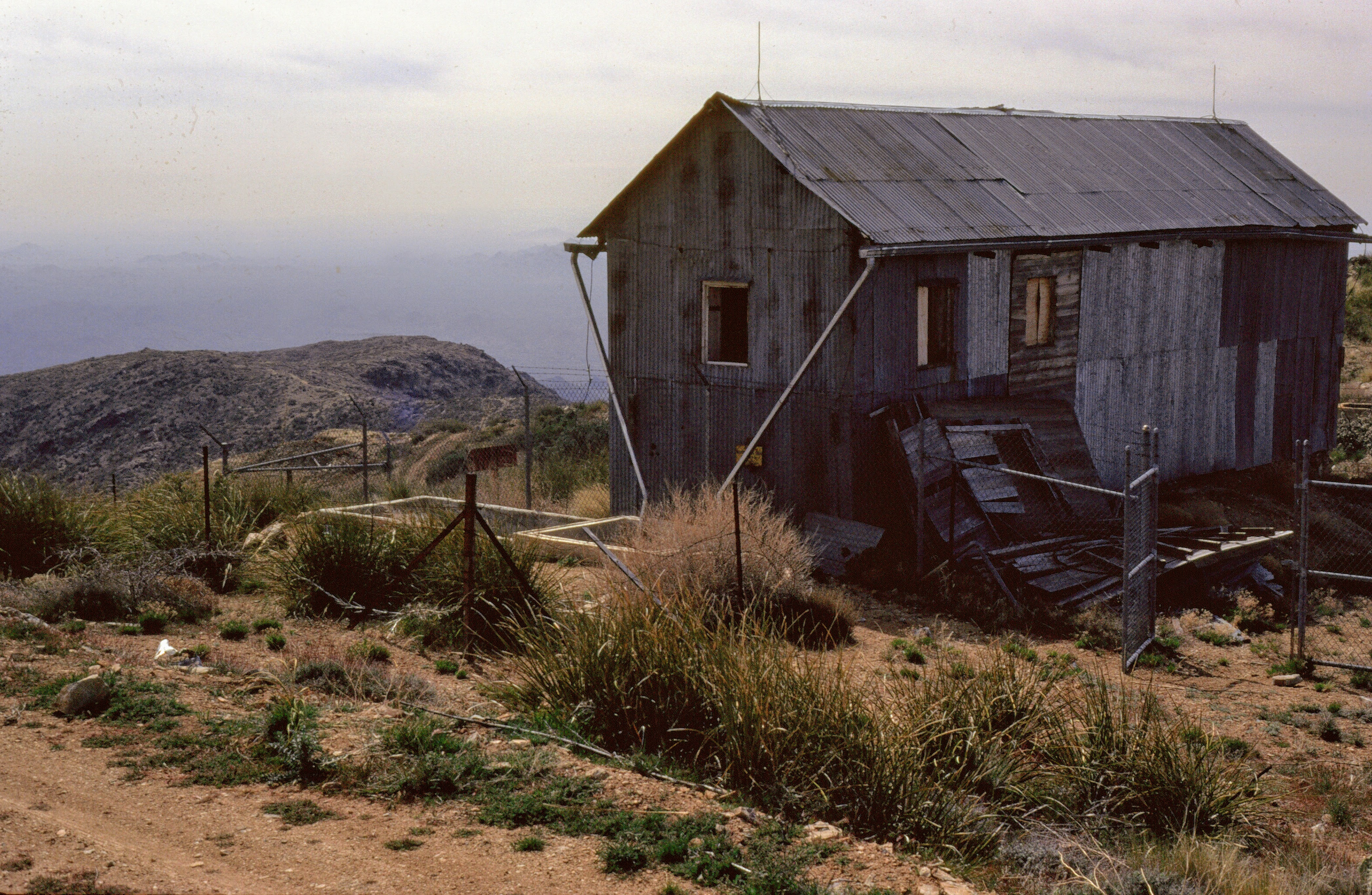
- Observatory in 2012.

- Location within Arizona
- Location: East of Wenden, Arizona off U.S. Route 60
- Coordinates: 33.812175°N 113.346906°W
- Area: 10 acres (4.0 ha)
- Built: 1920
- NRHP reference No.: 75000370
- Added to NRHP: October 3, 1975

The Harquahala Peak Observatory, at elevation 5,680 feet (1,730 m) on Harquahala Peak near Wenden, Arizona, United States, is an adobe two-story building built with wooden beams, but it appears fragile due to it being covered with corrugated tin roof and siding. It has a wooden second-story porch. A "cement water catchment device" is on its northern end.

The much-deteriorated observatory, along with 10 acres (4.0 ha), was listed on the National Register of Historic Places in 1975. A small storage shed was a second contributing building in the listing. The two buildings were built in 1920 by the Smithsonian Institution. Scientists staffed the observatory from 1920 to 1925.

The location "was picked because of its remoteness from pollution, and for the region's high percentage of cloudless days. Solar observations began on October 3, 1920, and for five years, measurements of the solar constant were taken at the site. The equipment used was a pyroheliometer perhaps an alternate name for Pyrheliometer, an early device used to measure the Sun's energy output in ergs per second per square centimetre. The solar constant measurement, which has since been abandoned as a method, was used to determine the effect of the Sun's energy output on the Earth's climate. Although results concerning weather forecasting were inconclusive, the five year study, using data from both Harquahala Peak and Mt. Montezuma, indicated that the amount of energy reaching the Earth from the Sun was constant over the Earth's surface. In order to gain easier access and better atmospheric conditions, the Harquahala Peak Observatory was moved in 1925 from Arizona to Table Mountain, California."

"Two observatories had been built prior to the Harquahala Peak station. Both are still in operation; the Lowell Observatory in Flagstaff, established in 1894 by Percival Lowell, and the Steward Observatory, built in 1916 by the University of Arizona at Tucson. Since that time, several other observatories have been built and maintained in Arizona. Among these are; the Northern Arizona University and U.S. Naval Observatories in Flagstaff, the National Center for Optical Astronomy, established in 1957 at Kitt Peak, and, most recently, the Smithsonian Astrophysical Observatory on Mount Hopkins, south of Tucson."

It was deemed significant as representing "an early phase in the development of American astrophysics. Harquahala Peak Observatory is of national significance for its contribution to the developing science of astrophysics."

It is located in the Harquahala Mountains Wilderness in La Paz County, Arizona, west southwest of Wickenburg and east of Wenden off to the south of U.S. Route 60. It overlooks semi-arid plains at elevation 1,500–2,000 feet (460–610 m). It is currently owned by the Bureau of Land Management.

"Arizona, with its high frequency of clear and cloud-free days and nights, is increasingly referred to as the 'world-wide capital' of astronomical research. The significance of astronomy in Arizona can be traced from historical sites, such as Harquahala Peak Observatory"

Also in Arizona, and operating in 2021 are Kitt Peak National Observatory (at 6,883 feet (2,098 m), est. 1958) and Lowell Observatory (at 7,250 feet (2,210 m)est. 1894)
