= Parker Jail =

United States historic place in La Paz County, Arizona

- U.S. National Register of Historic Places
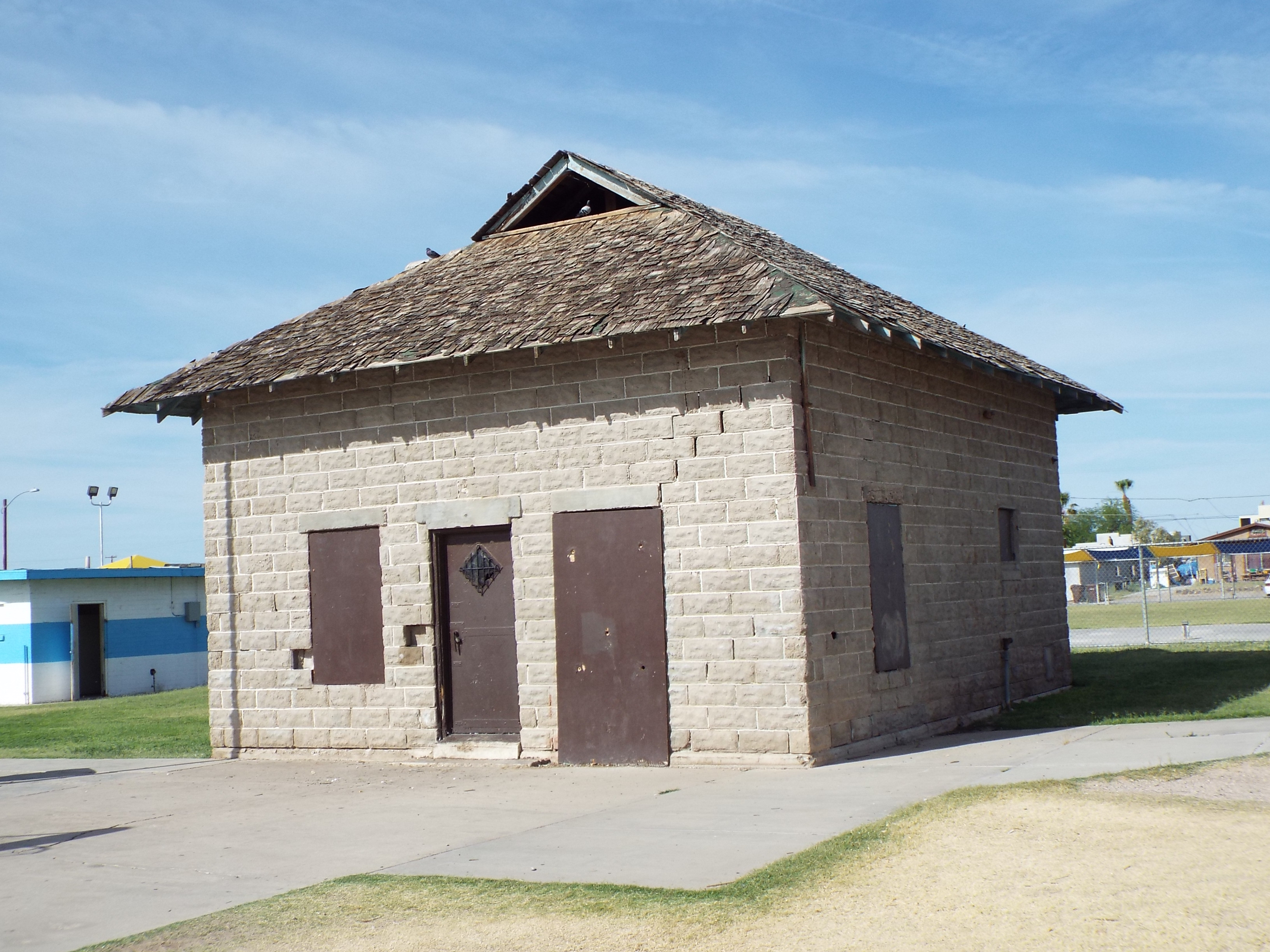

- Location within Arizona
- Location: N side of Agency Rd. in Pop Harvey Park, Parker, Arizona
- Coordinates: 34°08′55″N 114°17′39″W
- Area: 1 acre (0.40 ha)
- Built: 1914
- Built by: John King (contractor); John F. Collins (carpenter-mason)
- NRHP reference No.: 75000369
- Added to NRHP: April 3, 1975

The Parker Jail, or Old Parker Jail, is a historic jail in Parker, Arizona which was built in 1914. It was listed on the National Register of Historic Places in 1975.

It is a 24 by 30 feet (7.3 m × 9.1 m) cement block building, which originally held two cells and an office.

It was used as a jail until 1947 and is located in what is now Pop Harvey City Park. In 1975 the city had plans to restore it as a museum.

What is now the Parker Area Historical Society was founded in 1972, as the "Save The Jail Committee". It was incorporated in 1979 as the Parker Area Historical Society, and opened its museum in 1999.
