= Poston, Arizona =

CDP in La Paz County, Arizona

- Census-designated place
- Location in La Paz County and the state of Arizona

- Location within Arizona Location within the United States
- Coordinates: 33°59′32″N 114°24′16″W
- Country: United States
- State: Arizona
- County: La Paz

Area
  - Total: 1.37 sq mi (3.56 km^{2})
  - Land: 1.37 sq mi (3.56 km^{2})
  - Water: 0 sq mi (0.00 km^{2})
- Elevation: 331 ft (101 m)

Population (2020)
  - Total: 183
  - Density: 133/sq mi (51.4/km^{2})
- Time zone: UTC-7 (MST (no DST))
- ZIP code: 85371
- Area code: 928
- FIPS code: 04-57170
- GNIS feature ID: 2409097

Poston is an unincorporated community and census-designated place (CDP) in La Paz County, Arizona, United States, in the Parker Valley. The population was 285 at the 2010 census, down from 389 in 2000.

During World War II, Poston was the site of the Poston War Relocation Center, one of the United States' largest Japanese-American internment camps, where over 17,000 Japanese-Americans were held over a three-year period. The camp sites are now home to a monument dedicated to those interned there.

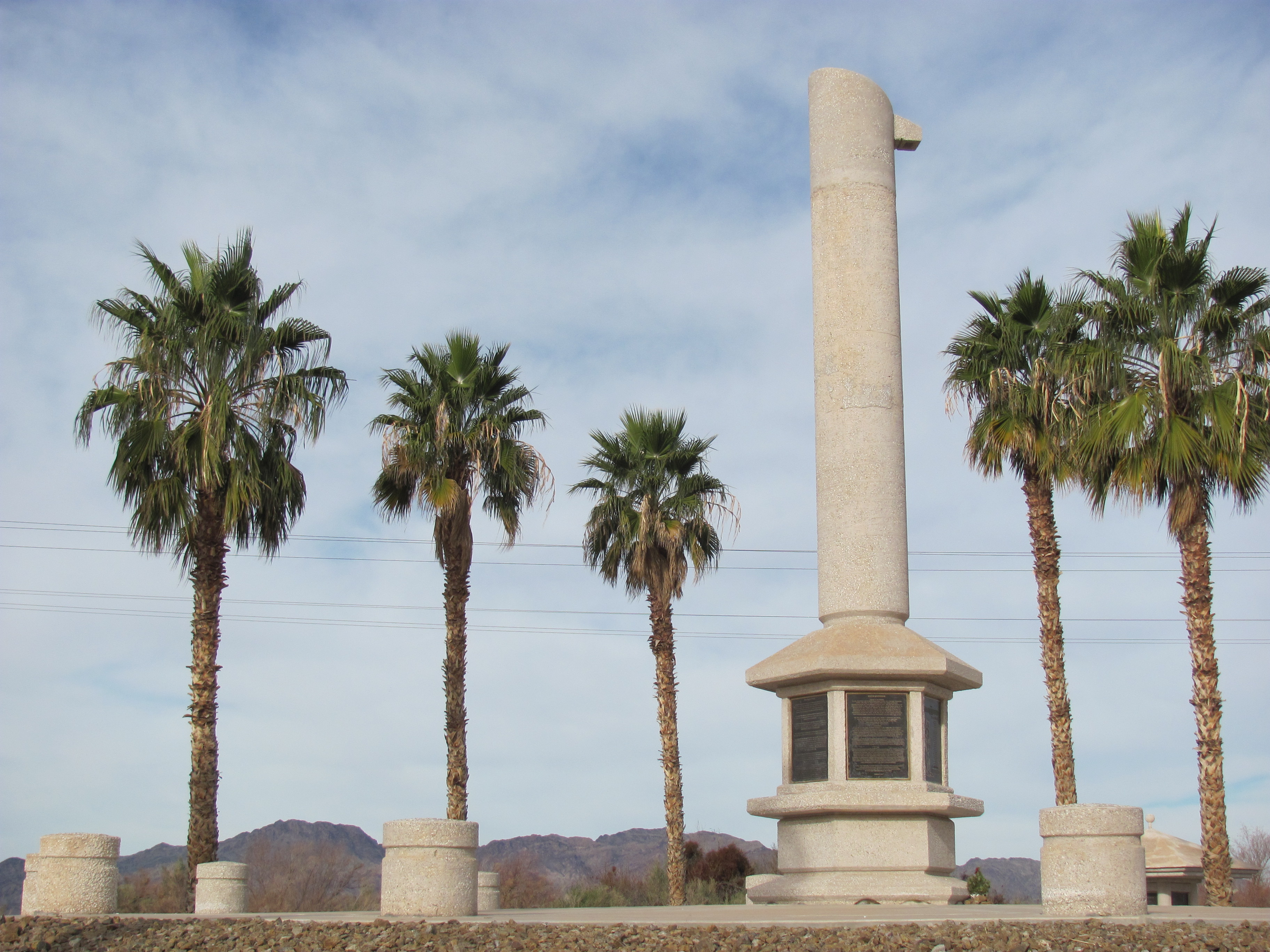
Memorial Monument at the Poston War Relocation Center

== Geography ==
Poston is located in western La Paz County, in the Parker Valley 3 miles (5 km) east of the Colorado River, which forms the state border with California. Mohave Road runs through the community, leading north 15 miles (24 km) to Parker and south 28 miles (45 km) to Ehrenberg. The community lies within the boundaries of the Colorado River Indian Reservation.

According to the United States Census Bureau, the Poston CDP has a total area of 1.4 square miles (3.6 km^{2}), all land.

== Demographics ==
Historical population
Census	Pop.	Note	%±
2000	389		—
2010	285		−26.7%
2020	183		−35.8%
U.S. Decennial Census

As of the census of 2000, there were 389 people, 101 households, and 92 families residing in the CDP. The population density was 279.9 inhabitants per square mile (108.1/km^{2}). There were 110 housing units at an average density of 79.1 per square mile (30.5/km^{2}). The racial makeup of the CDP was 31% White, 1% Black or African American, 17% Native American, 48% from other races, and 3% from two or more races. 77% of the population were Hispanic or Latino of any race.

There were 101 households, out of which 66% had children under the age of 18 living with them, 66% were married couples living together, 16% had a female householder with no husband present, and 9% were non-families. 7% of all households were made up of individuals, and 2% had someone living alone who was 65 years of age or older. The average household size was 3.85 and the average family size was 3.92.

In the CDP, the population was spread out, with 42% under the age of 18, 11% from 18 to 24, 30% from 25 to 44, 13% from 45 to 64, and 4% who were 65 years of age or older. The median age was 23 years. For every 100 females, there were 110.3 males. For every 100 females age 18 and over, there were 107.3 males.

The median income for a household in the CDP was $17,625, and the median income for a family was $17,065. Males had a median income of $15,859 versus $13,125 for females. The per capita income for the CDP was $6,938. About 42% of families and 46% of the population were below the poverty line, including 55% of those under age 18 and 18% of those age 65 or over.

== Notable people ==
- Doris Matsui (born 1944) – U.S. representative for California
