= Old Presbyterian Church (Parker, Arizona) =

Historic church in Arizona, United States

- U.S. National Register of Historic Places
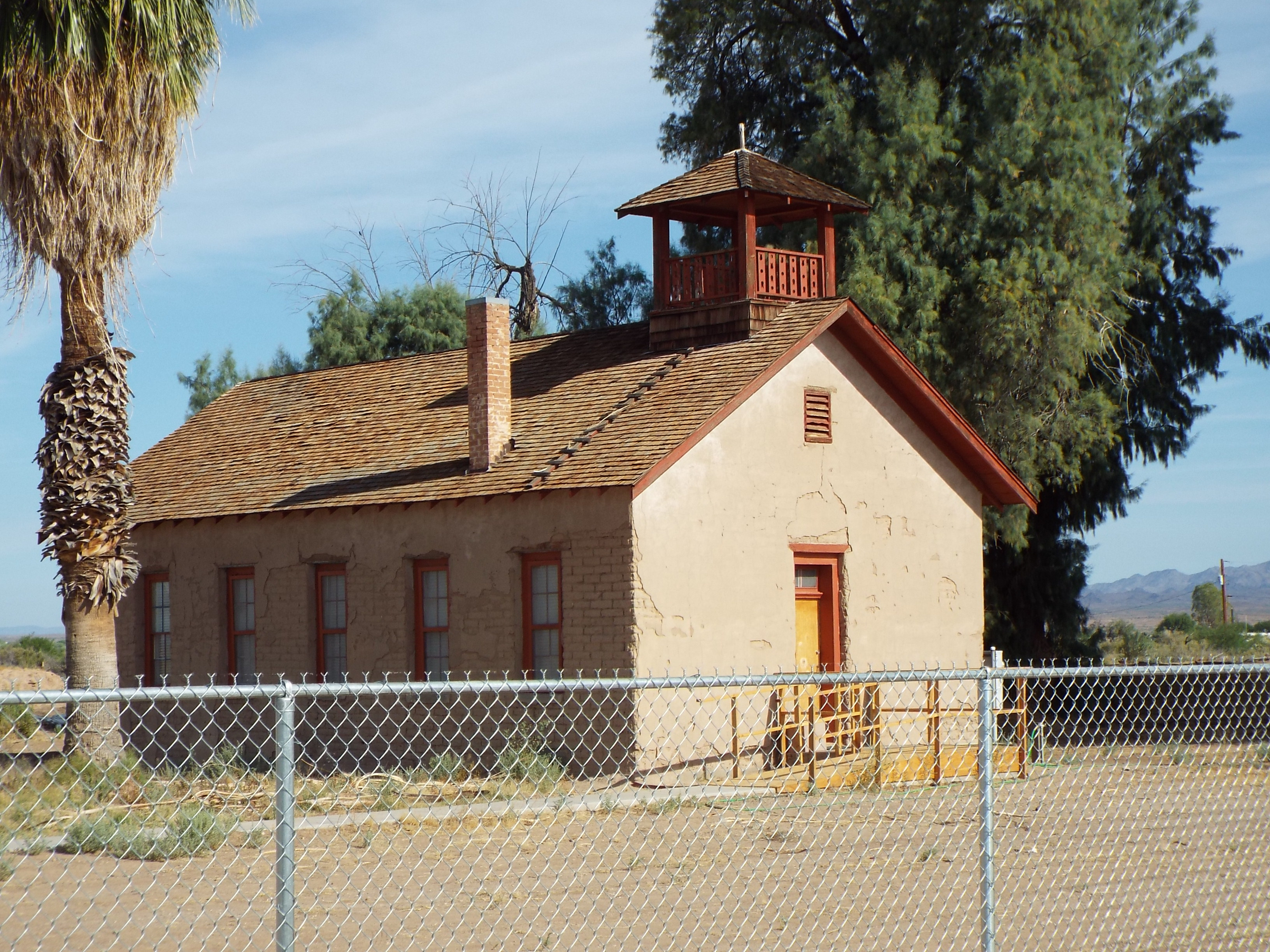

- Location within Arizona Location within the United States
- Nearest city: Parker, Arizona
- Coordinates: 34°6′45″N 114°18′48″W
- Built: 1917
- NRHP reference No.: 71000122
- Added to NRHP: June 3, 1971

The Old Presbyterian Church near Parker, Arizona, also known as Mojave Indian Presbyterian Mission Church, was built in 1917. It is located in what is now La Paz County, Arizona, south of Parker. It was listed on the National Register of Historic Places in 1971.

It is a "simple and unpretentious" adobe building, 43 feet (13 m) long by 24 feet (7.3 m) wide. It is not listed for its architecture, but rather for its association with the Mohave people and the Presbyterian Church's influence with them, which started in 1907. It is owned by the Colorado River Indian Tribes.
