= Wenden, Arizona =

- Unincorporated community Census-designated place
- Location in La Paz County and the state of Arizona

- Location in the United States
- Coordinates: 33°49′32″N 113°32′17″W
- Country: United States
- State: Arizona
- County: La Paz

Area
  - Total: 14.94 sq mi (38.70 km^{2})
  - Land: 14.94 sq mi (38.70 km^{2})
  - Water: 0 sq mi (0.00 km^{2})
- Elevation: 1,867 ft (569 m)

Population (2020)
  - Total: 458
  - Density: 30.6/sq mi (11.83/km^{2})
- Time zone: UTC-7 (MST (no DST))
- ZIP code: 85357
- Area code: 928
- FIPS code: 04-81550
- GNIS feature ID: 0013469

Wenden is an unincorporated community in La Paz County, Arizona, United States. The population was 458 at the 2020 census, down from 728 at the 2010 census and 556 in 2000. For statistical purposes the United States Census Bureau has designated Wenden as a census-designated place (CDP).

== History ==
Wenden has experienced two 100-year floods due to the flooding of the Centennial Wash. Residents were forced to evacuate to higher ground in the nearby town of Salome during these extreme rainfall events, in 2000 and 2010.

== Geography ==
Wenden is located in eastern La Paz County. U.S. Route 60 passes through the town, leading northeast 48 miles (77 km) to Wickenburg and southwest 30 miles (48 km) to Interstate 10 between Brenda and Quartzsite.

According to the United States Census Bureau, the Wenden CDP has a total area of 14.9 square miles (38.7 km^{2}), all land.

=== Climate ===
This area has a large amount of sunshine year-round due to its stable descending air and high pressure. According to the Köppen Climate Classification system, Wenden has a desert climate, abbreviated "BWh" on climate maps.

== Demographics ==
Historical population
| Census | Pop. | Note | %± |
|---|---|---|---|
| 2000 | 556 | | — |
| 2010 | 728 | | 30.9% |
| 2020 | 458 | | −37.1% |
U.S. Decennial Census

As of the census of 2000, there were 556 people, 207 households, and 150 families residing in the CDP. The population density was 37.4 inhabitants per square mile (14.4/km^{2}). There were 309 housing units at an average density of 20.8 per square mile (8.0/km^{2}). The racial makeup of the CDP was 84.0% White, 1.3% Native American, 0.2% Asian, 12.6% from other races, and 2.0% from two or more races. Hispanic or Latino of any race were 44.2% of the population.

There were 207 households, out of which 28.5% had children under the age of 18 living with them, 58.0% were married couples living together, 8.2% had a female householder with no husband present, and 27.5% were non-families. 21.7% of all households were made up of individuals, and 17.4% had someone living alone who was 65 years of age or older. The average household size was 2.69 and the average family size was 3.15.

In the CDP, the population was spread out, with 29.5% under the age of 18, 5.9% from 18 to 24, 22.3% from 25 to 44, 19.6% from 45 to 64, and 22.7% who were 65 years of age or older. The median age was 39 years. For every 100 females, there were 91.1 males. For every 100 females age 18 and over, there were 101.0 males.

The median income for a household in the CDP was $20,870, and the median income for a family was $25,208. Males had a median income of $27,153 versus $15,500 for females. The per capita income for the CDP was $11,674. About 25.1% of families and 31.2% of the population were below the poverty line, including 50.0% of those under age 18 and 2.7% of those age 65 or over.

== Infrastructure ==
The Wenden Domestic Water Improvement District supplies drinking water to Wenden.
