= Whispering Pines, Arizona =

CDP in Gila County, Arizona

- Census-designated place
- Location within Arizona Location within the United States
- Coordinates: 34°22′16″N 111°17′0″W
- Country: United States
- State: Arizona
- County: Gila

Area
  - Total: 0.43 sq mi (1.11 km^{2})
  - Land: 0.43 sq mi (1.11 km^{2})
  - Water: 0 sq mi (0.00 km^{2})
- Elevation: 5,200 ft (1,600 m)

Population (2020)
  - Total: 124
  - Density: 288.9/sq mi (111.54/km^{2})
- Time zone: UTC-7 (MST (no DST))
- ZIP code: 85541
- Area code: 928
- FIPS code: 04-82270
- GNIS feature ID: 2582900

Whispering Pines is a census-designated place (CDP) in Gila County, Arizona, United States. It is one of two locations in Arizona with this name, the other being a populated place in Greenlee County. The population was 148 at the 2010 United States census.

== Geography ==
Whispering Pines is located in northern Gila County in the upper valley of the East Verde River, between Washington Park to the north and Beaver Valley to the south. It is 12 miles (19 km) north of Payson.

According to the United States Census Bureau, the Whispering Pines CDP has a total area of 0.43 square miles (1.11 km^{2}), all land.

== Demographics ==
Historical population
Census	Pop.	Note	%±
2020	124		—
U.S. Decennial Census

== Education ==
It is in the Payson Unified School District. Payson High School is the zoned comprehensive high school.
