= Freedom Acres, Arizona =

CDP in Gila County, Arizona

- Census-designated place
- Location within Arizona Location within the United States
- Coordinates: 34°19′1″N 111°17′58″W
- Country: United States
- State: Arizona
- County: Gila

Area
  - Total: 1.75 sq mi (4.54 km^{2})
  - Land: 1.75 sq mi (4.54 km^{2})
  - Water: 0 sq mi (0.00 km^{2})
- Elevation: 4,880 ft (1,490 m)

Population (2020)
  - Total: 90
  - Density: 51.3/sq mi (19.81/km^{2})
- Time zone: UTC-7 (MST (no DST))
- ZIP code: 85541
- Area code: 928
- FIPS code: 04-25735
- GNIS feature ID: 40828

Freedom Acres is a census-designated place (CDP) in Gila County, Arizona, United States. The population was 90 at the 2020 census, up from 84 at the 2010 census.

== Geography ==
Freedom Acres is located in northern Gila County on Sunflower Mesa, 7 miles (11 km) north of Payson via Houston Mesa Road. It is bordered to the north by the Beaver Valley CDP. The East Verde River forms the northern and western edge of the Freedom Acres CDP, and Shoofly Canyon forms the southwestern edge. According to the United States Census Bureau, the CDP has a total area of 1.75 square miles (4.54 km^{2}), all land.

== Demographics ==
Historical population
Census	Pop.	Note	%±
2010	84		—
2020	90		7.1%
U.S. Decennial Census

== Education ==
It is in the Payson Unified School District. Payson High School is the zoned comprehensive high school.
