= Mead Ranch, Arizona =

CDP in Gila County, Arizona

- Census-designated place
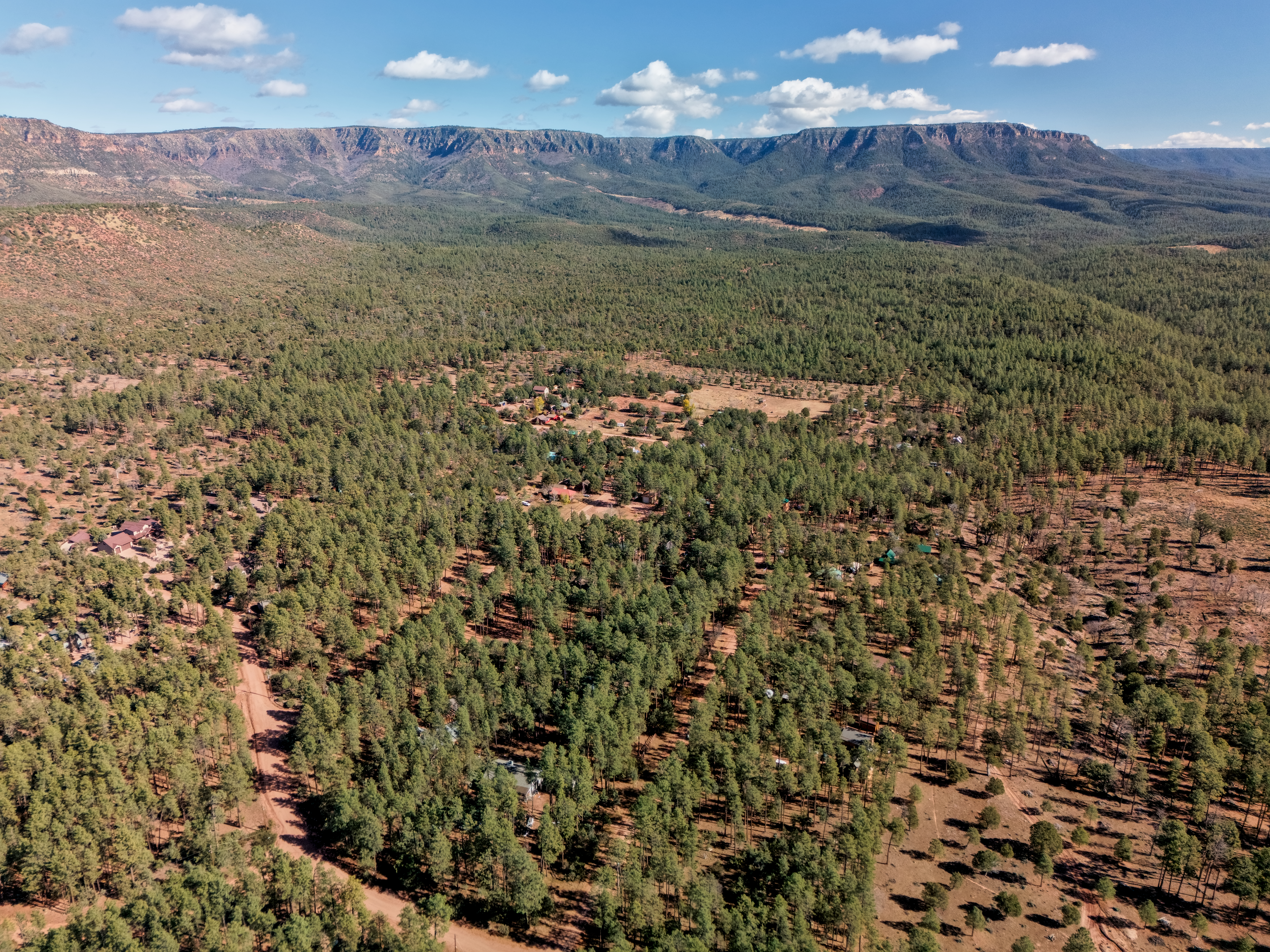
- Aerial view of Mead Ranch underneath the Mogollon Rim

- Location within Arizona Location within the United States
- Coordinates: 34°20′47″N 111°8′31″W
- Country: United States
- State: Arizona
- County: Gila

Area
  - Total: 0.60 sq mi (1.55 km^{2})
  - Land: 0.60 sq mi (1.55 km^{2})
  - Water: 0 sq mi (0.00 km^{2})
- Elevation: 6,000 ft (1,800 m)

Population (2020)
  - Total: 42
  - Density: 70.2/sq mi (27.12/km^{2})
- Time zone: UTC-7 (MST (no DST))
- ZIP code: 85541
- Area code: 928
- FIPS code: 04-45275
- GNIS feature ID: 40821

Mead Ranch is a census-designated place (CDP) in Gila County, Arizona, United States. The population was 38 at the 2010 census.

== Geography ==
The CDP is located in northern Gila County at the southern foot of the Mogollon Rim. It is 5 miles (8 km) by dirt roads north of Arizona State Route 260 at Kohls Ranch, and 21 miles (34 km) northeast of Payson. According to the United States Census Bureau, the Mead Ranch CDP has a total area of 0.60 square miles (1.55 km^{2}), all land.

== Demographics ==
Historical population
| Census | Pop. | Note | %± |
|---|---|---|---|
| 2020 | 42 | | — |
U.S. Decennial Census

== Education ==
It is in the Payson Unified School District. Payson High School is the zoned comprehensive high school.
