= Geronimo Estates, Arizona =

CDP in Gila County, Arizona

- Census-designated place
- Location within the state of Arizona Geronimo Estates (the United States)
- Coordinates: 34°22′10″N 111°21′42″W
- Country: United States
- State: Arizona
- County: Gila

Area
  - Total: 1.38 sq mi (3.58 km^{2})
  - Land: 1.38 sq mi (3.58 km^{2})
  - Water: 0 sq mi (0.00 km^{2})
- Elevation: 5,334 ft (1,626 m)

Population (2020)
  - Total: 30
  - Density: 21.7/sq mi (8.38/km^{2})
- Time zone: UTC-7 (MST (no DST))
- ZIP code: 85541
- Area code: 928
- FIPS code: 04-26780
- GNIS feature ID: 2582789

Geronimo Estates is both a census-designated place (CDP) and a populated place in Gila County, Arizona, United States. The population of the CDP was 60 at the 2010 census.

== Geography ==
Geronimo Estates CDP is located in northern Gila County in the valley of Webber Creek, 12 miles (19 km) north of Payson via Paint Pony Drive. It is within Tonto National Forest, 3 miles (5 km) south of the Mogollon Rim. According to the United States Census Bureau, the CDP has a total area of 1.32 square miles (3.42 km^{2}), all land. Via Webber Creek, it is in the watershed of the East Verde River. The populated place of the same name is located nearby, at 34°22′01″N 111°21′31″W

== Demographics ==
Historical population
Census	Pop.	Note	%±
2020	30		—
U.S. Decennial Census

== Education ==
It is in the Payson Unified School District. Payson High School is the zoned comprehensive high school.
