= Bear Flat, Arizona =

CDP in Gila County, Arizona

- Census-designated place
- Location of Bear Flat in Gila County, Arizona.

- Location within Arizona Location within the United States
- Coordinates: 34°17′35″N 111°04′03″W
- Country: United States
- State: Arizona
- County: Gila

Area
  - Total: 0.16 sq mi (0.41 km^{2})
  - Land: 0.16 sq mi (0.41 km^{2})
  - Water: 0 sq mi (0.00 km^{2})
- Elevation: 4,964 ft (1,513 m)

Population (2020)
  - Total: 11
  - Density: 69.1/sq mi (26.68/km^{2})
- Time zone: UTC-7 (Mountain (MST))
- Area code: 928
- GNIS feature ID: 40865

Bear Flat is a census-designated place (CDP) in Gila County, Arizona, United States. Bear Flat is located in the valley of Tonto Creek, 18 miles (29 km) east of the town of Payson. The population as of the 2010 census was 18.

== Geography ==
Bear Flat is located at 34.292399°N 111.067383°W.

According to the U.S. Census Bureau, the CDP has an area of 0.211 square miles (0.55 km^{2}), all land.

== Demographics ==
Historical population
Census	Pop.	Note	%±
2010	18		—
2020	11		−38.9%
U.S. Decennial Census

Bear Flat first appeared on the 2010 U.S. Census as a census-designated place (CDP).

== Education ==
It is in the Payson Unified School District. Payson High School is the zoned comprehensive high school.
