= Flowing Springs, Arizona =

CDP in Gila County, Arizona

- Census-designated place
- Location of Flowing Springs in Gila County, Arizona.

- Location within Arizona Location within the United States
- Coordinates: 34°18′55″N 111°20′04″W
- Country: United States
- State: Arizona
- County: Gila

Area
  - Total: 1.71 sq mi (4.43 km^{2})
  - Land: 1.71 sq mi (4.42 km^{2})
  - Water: 0.0039 sq mi (0.01 km^{2})
- Elevation: 4,606 ft (1,404 m)

Population (2020)
  - Total: 34
  - Density: 19.9/sq mi (7.69/km^{2})
- Time zone: UTC-7 (Mountain (MST))
- ZIP code: 85541
- Area code: 928
- GNIS feature ID: 40834

Flowing Springs is a census-designated place in Gila County in the U.S. state of Arizona. Flowing Springs is located approximately eight miles north of the town of Payson. The population was 34 at the 2020 census, down from 42 at the 2010 census.

== Geography ==
Flowing Springs is located at 34.309304°N 111.334731°W.

The community has an area of 1.709 square miles (4.43 km^{2}); 1.707 square miles (4.42 km^{2}) of its area is land, and 0.002 square miles (0.0052 km^{2}) is water.

== Demographics ==
Historical population
Census	Pop.	Note	%±
2010	42		—
2020	34		−19.0%
U.S. Decennial Census

== Education ==
It is in the Payson Unified School District. Payson High School is the zoned comprehensive high school.
