= Payson High School (Arizona) =

Public school in Payson, Gila County, Arizona

- Home of the Longhorns

Location
- 301 S. McLane; Payson, Arizona, Gila 85541; United States; 34°14′13″N 111°19′48″W

Information
- School type: Public high school
- Established: 1962 (64 years ago)
- School district: Payson Unified School District
- CEEB code: 030255
- Principal: Jeff Simon
- Staff: 42.51 (FTE)
- Grades: 9–12
- Enrollment: 748 (2023–2024)
- Student to teacher ratio: 17.60
- Campus type: Rural
- Colors: Purple and gold
- Mascot: Longhorn
- Feeder schools: Rim Country Middle School
- Website: pusd10.org/phs/

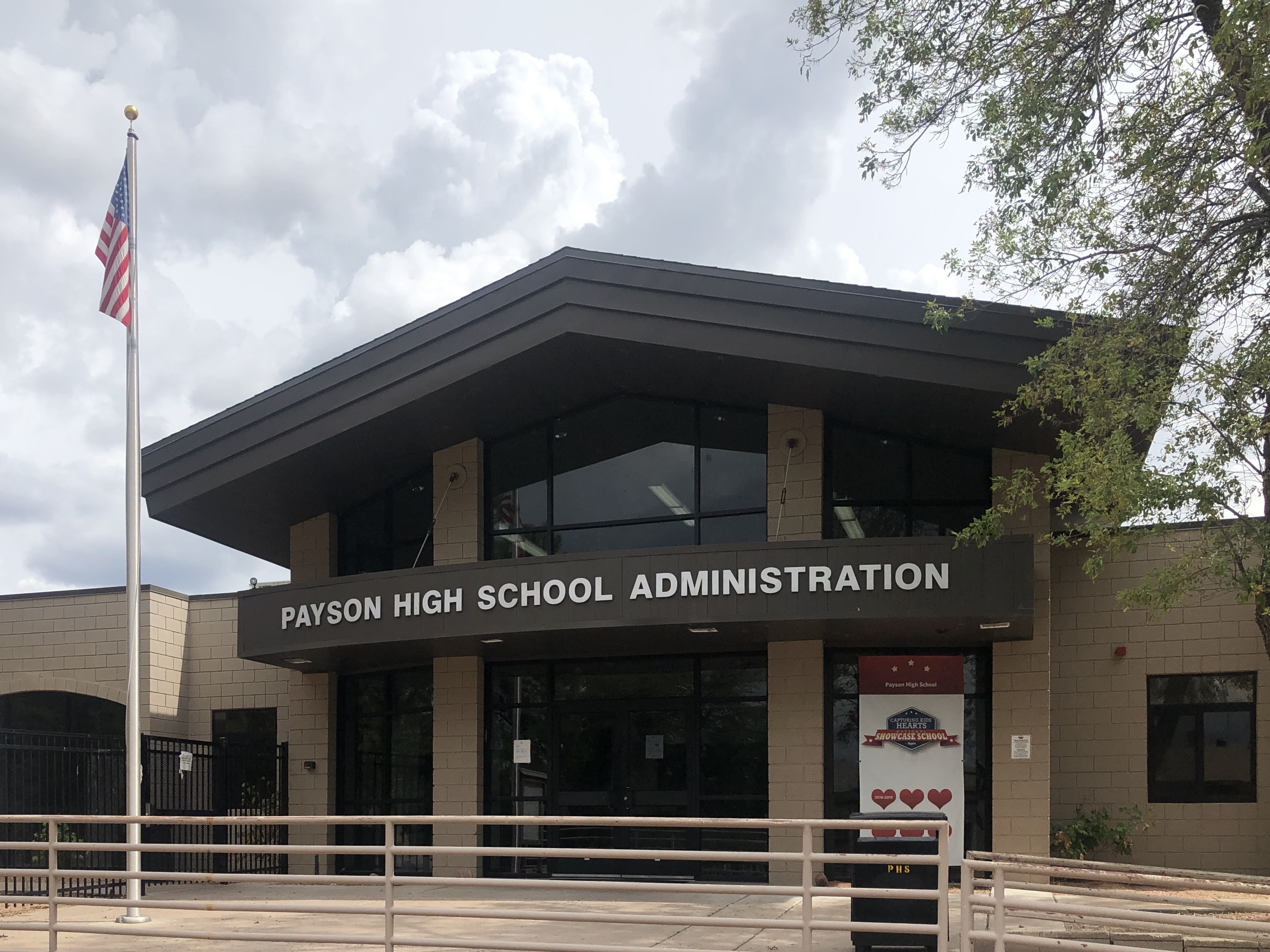
Payson High School

Payson High School (PHS) is a public high school located in the rural town of Payson, Arizona, United States. It is one of two high schools within Payson Unified School District. PHS enrolls approximately 750 students.

== History ==
Payson's first schoolhouse was completed in the spring of 1938, and it served all students in the community. This first school, known as the Rock Building, continued to house high school aged students until 1955. By the 1958–59 school year, there were over 60 students that were high school age. As this population continued to increase a separate building was deemed necessary and in 1962 the construction of Payson High School (PHS) began. This same year, Ivan Wade became the first superintendent of Payson Unified School District, and the district was officially empowered to grant high school diplomas.

The first athletic programs also began in 1962, with the football program practicing in a pasture near the golf course – no home games were played that first season. By 1965, the current A-Building at the high school was open for learning and administrative offices. Without a gymnasium in these early years, high school students hustled almost one mile down the hill to use the Rock Building. Students continued to make the two-mile run, round-trip, to the Rock Building until 1967 when a gymnasium was constructed at PHS. The football field was also built this same year.

In 1979, the autos and wood shop programs moved into their current home. The academic building, also known as the B-Building, was completed in 1984. This new building providing PHS a library and nine classrooms, three of which were set up as science laboratory facilities. By the winter of 1988, the community auditorium was completed and the PHS drama department was showcasing its very first performance under the direction of John Siler. In 1988, the current Alternative to Suspension/In-School Suspension classroom was completed, although at the time it served as a small administration building.

The student population continued to grow through the 90s, and by 1994 construction began on the C-Building. This building was specifically designed to house Career Technical Education (CTE) courses, complete with a state-of-the-art kitchen, prep room, and dining room. The C-Building includes another six classrooms, three of which are computer labs.

In 1997, the Dave Wilson Dome, named after the police chief killed in the line of duty, was built. Around this same time, the current physics laboratory facility, was converted from a locker bay to a classroom by enclosing the roofed structure. Building continued in 1998, as the Stagecraft (Drama) Department received the black box theater.

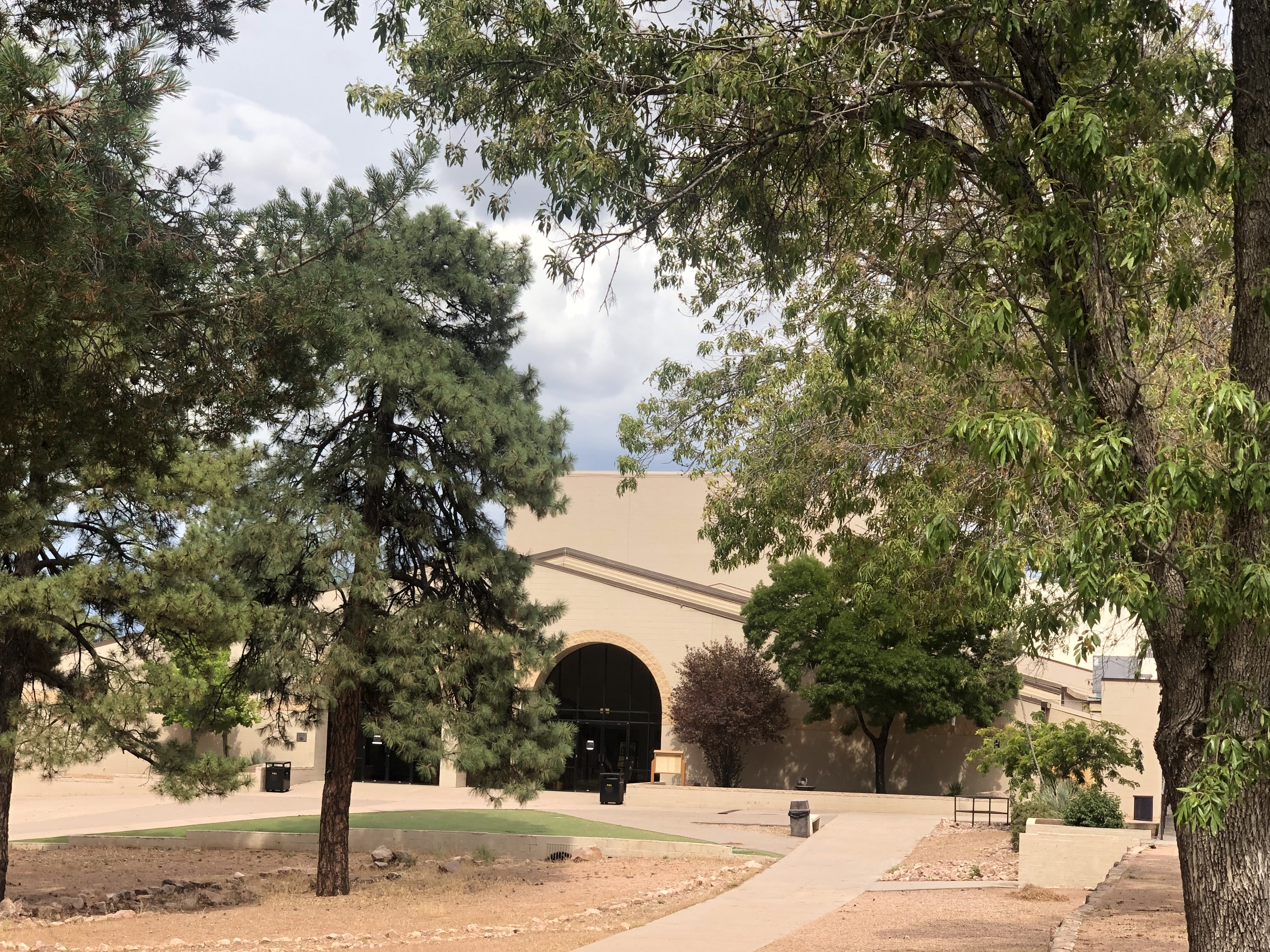
Payson High School auditorium

In 2003, the D-Building was constructed, complete with a cafeteria capable of seating 133 students. This building includes another six classrooms, and is now the home of the English Department.

The Wendell Stevens Agricultural Building opened in 2010. This building was named in honor of Wendell Stevens, the longtime agricultural education and FFA teacher who spent his entire career at PHS and retired that same year. This facility contains a barn, classroom, machine shop, office, as well as two small animal examination and treatment rooms.

In the fall of 2010, PHS was outfitted with solar panels covering two parking lots. The energy installed on this campus and two others combined for a total of 1.45 MW of DC power. This grid-tied photovoltaic system "successfully delivered a complete turn-key, cost-effective, efficient energy solution to Payson Unified School District. At the time of groundbreaking, this was the largest PV system on a K–12 education campus in the State of Arizona." The old gymnasium was given a new roof in 2012, and was renamed "The Longhorn Gym".

== Area ==
The Payson school district includes: the municipalities of Payson and Star Valley, as well as multiple census-designated places: Bear Flat, Beaver Valley, Christopher Creek, Deer Creek, East Verde Estates, Flowing Springs, Freedom Acres, Geronimo Estates, Gisela, Hunter Creek, Jakes Corner, Kohls Ranch, Mead Ranch, Mesa del Caballo, Oxbow Estates, Round Valley, Rye, Tonto Village, Washington Park, and Whispering Pines.

The Chevelon Butte School District, which covers most of Blue Ridge, does not operate any schools. It sends its Blue Ridge area students to Payson USD for high school.

== Academics ==
Payson High School has a wide variety of academic options including offerings from Career Technical Education (CTE), Northern Arizona Vocational Institute of Technology (NAVIT), Advanced Placement (AP) and dual-credit courses that are taught on campus and provided through partnerships with Gila Community College (GCC) and Eastern Arizona College (EAC).

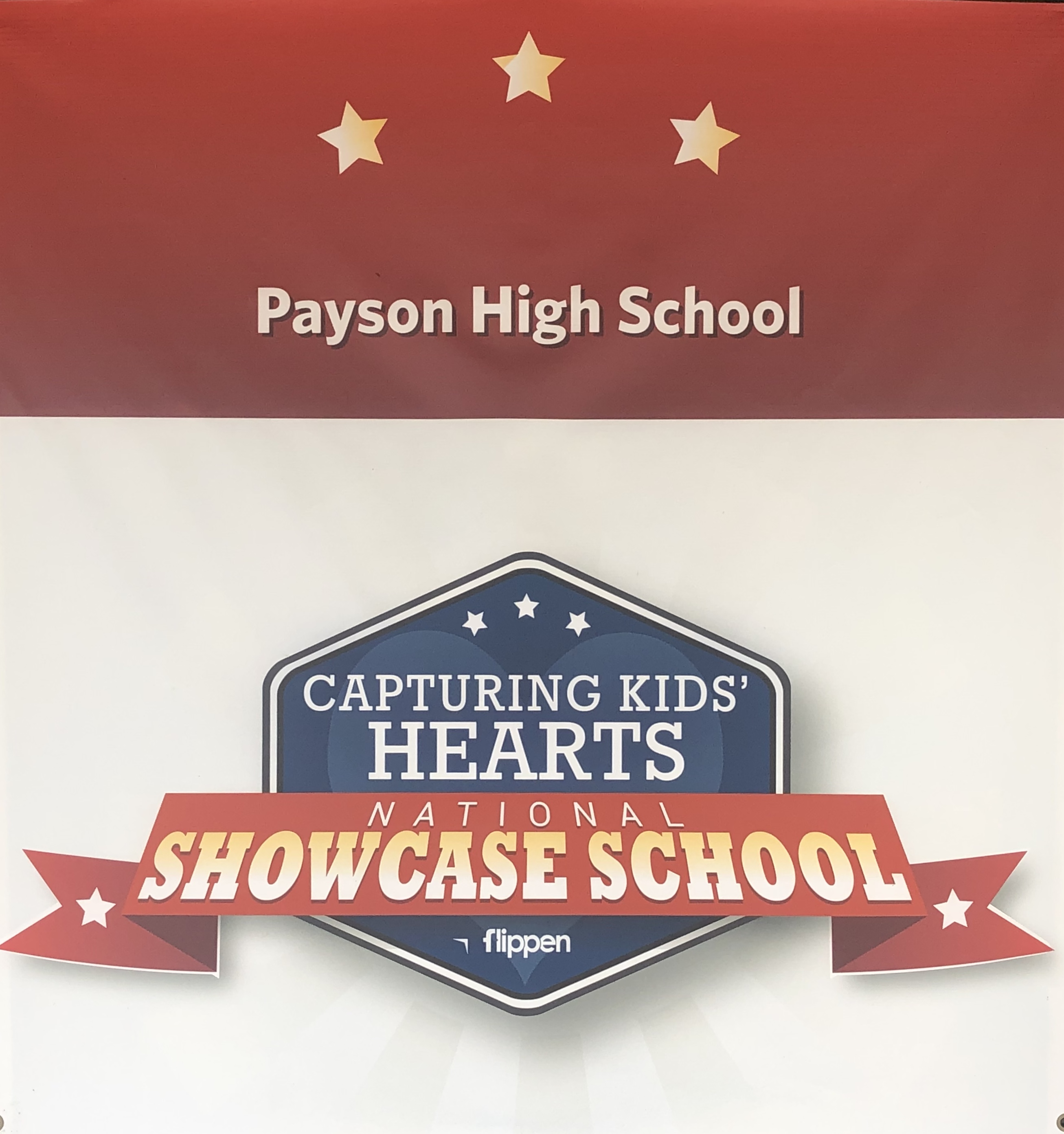
Payson High School – Showcase School

=== Academic recognition ===
PHS students, programs and staff have received state and national recognition.

The Modern Choir performed at Carnegie Hall in June 2007.

== Athletics ==
The Payson Longhorns compete mainly in the 3A – East Conference, and are a member of the Arizona Interscholastic Association (AIA), which governs most sports and competitive activities in the state of Arizona. Payson High School sponsors athletic teams in baseball, basketball, cheer, cross country, football, golf, soccer, softball, track & field, volleyball, and wrestling.

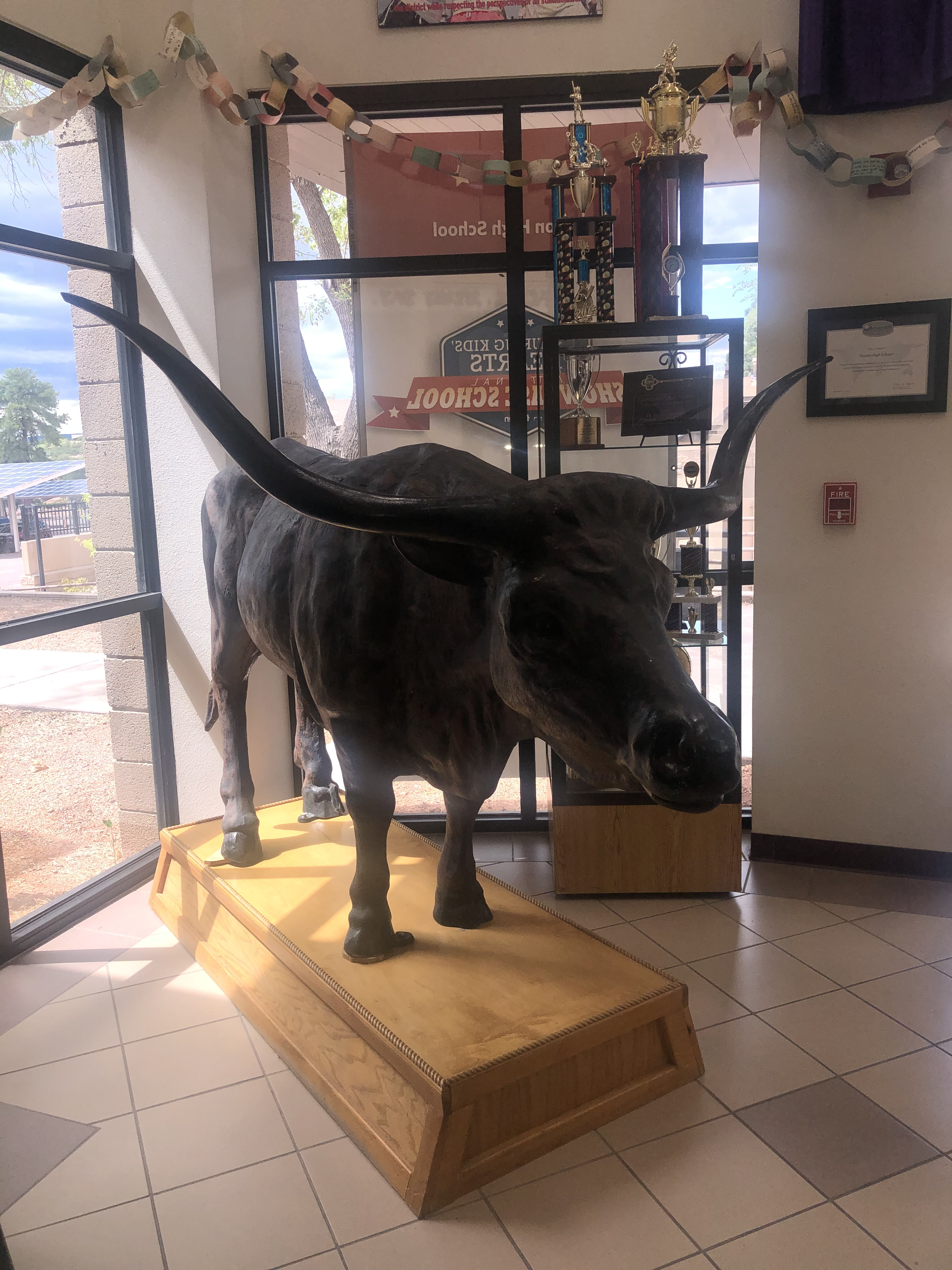
Payson High School Longhorns

=== Wrestling ===
Year	Finish	Class
1980–1981	1st	1A/2A
1981–1982	1st	1A/2A
1989–1990	1st	3A
1993–1994	1st	3A
1994–1995	1st	3A
1996–1997	1st	3A
1997–1998	1st	3A
1998–1999	1st	3A
1999–2000	1st	3A
2000–2001	1st	3A

=== Boys' track & field ===
Year	Finish	Class
1986–1987	1st	3A
1987–1988	1st	3A
1989–1990	1st	3A
2005–2006	1st	3A

=== Girls' track & field ===
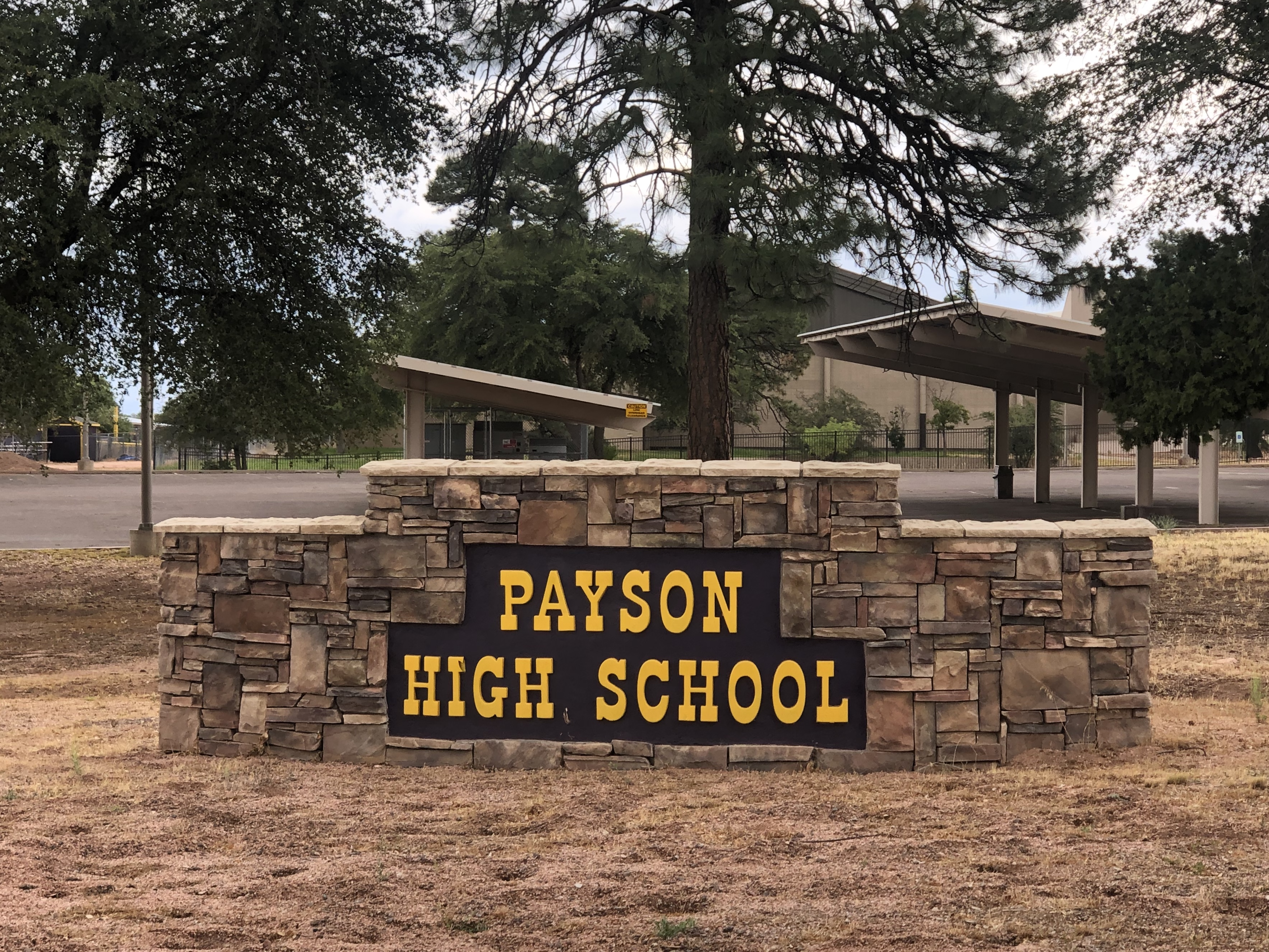
Payson High School

Year	Finish	Class
1982–1983	1st	2A
1998–1999	1st	3A
1999–2000	1st	3A
2000–2001	1st	3A

=== Girls' cross-country ===
Year	Finish	Class
2000–2001	1st	3A

=== Football ===
Year	Finish	Class
1981–1982	1st	2A
1997–1998	1st	3A
2008–2009	1st	3A

=== Boys' basketball ===
Year	Finish	Class
1978–1979	1st	

=== Baseball ===
Year	Finish	Class
1998–1999	1st	3A

=== Golf ===
Year	Finish	Class
2000–2001	1st	3A
