= Tonto Village, Arizona =

CDP in Gila County, Arizona

- Census-designated place
- Location within Arizona Location within the United States
- Coordinates: 34°18′58″N 111°7′55″W
- Country: United States
- State: Arizona
- County: Gila

Area
  - Total: 0.34 sq mi (0.87 km^{2})
  - Land: 0.34 sq mi (0.87 km^{2})
  - Water: 0 sq mi (0.00 km^{2})
- Elevation: 5,720 ft (1,740 m)

Population (2020)
  - Total: 209
  - Density: 625.1/sq mi (241.37/km^{2})
- Time zone: UTC-7 (MST (no DST))
- ZIP code: 85541
- Area code: 928
- FIPS code: 04-74665
- GNIS feature ID: 35390

Tonto Village is a census-designated place (CDP) in Gila County, Arizona, United States. The population was 256 at the 2010 United States census.

== Geography ==
Tonto Village is located in northern Gila County in Thompson Draw, a valley south of the Mogollon Rim. It is 1 mile (1.6 km) west of Arizona State Route 260, which leads southwest 15 miles (24 km) to Payson.

According to the United States Census Bureau, the Tonto Village CDP has a total area of 0.34 square miles (0.87 km^{2}), all land.

The Fire Control road that runs through the village is the sole point of access to the Diamond Point Fire Tower.

== Demographics ==
Historical population
Census	Pop.	Note	%±
2020	209		—
U.S. Decennial Census

== Education ==
It is in the Payson Unified School District. Payson High School is the zoned comprehensive high school.

The charter school and church that were previously listed have since closed.
