= Kohls Ranch, Arizona =

CDP in Gila County, Arizona

- Census-designated place
- Location within Arizona Location within the United States
- Coordinates: 34°19′31″N 111°5′36″W
- Country: United States
- State: Arizona
- County: Gila

Area
  - Total: 1.18 sq mi (3.05 km^{2})
  - Land: 1.18 sq mi (3.05 km^{2})
  - Water: 0 sq mi (0.00 km^{2})
- Elevation: 5,340 ft (1,630 m)

Population (2020)
  - Total: 30
  - Density: 25.5/sq mi (9.85/km^{2})
- Time zone: UTC-7 (MST (no DST))
- ZIP code: 85541
- Area code: 928
- FIPS code: 04-38600
- GNIS feature ID: 30808

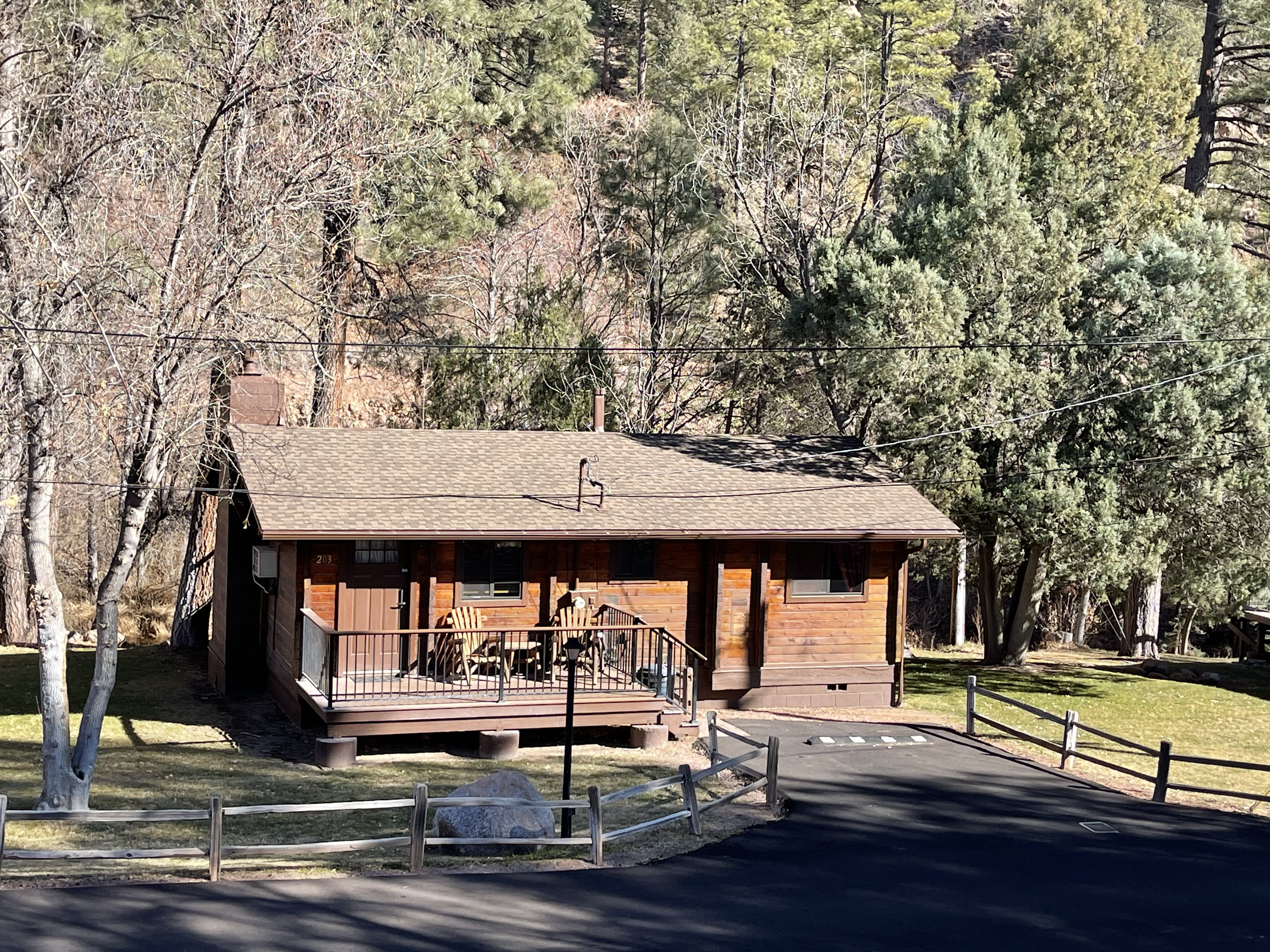
Kohl's Ranch Cabin

Kohls Ranch is a census-designated place (CDP) in Gila County, Arizona, United States. The population was 46 at the 2010 census.

== Geography ==
The CDP is located in northern Gila County at the southern foot of the Mogollon Rim, in the valley of the upper reaches of Tonto Creek. Arizona State Route 260 forms the northern edge of the CDP, running west 16 miles (26 km) to Payson and east 73 miles (117 km) to Show Low. According to the United States Census Bureau, the Kohls Ranch CDP has a total area of 1.17 square miles (3.03 km^{2}), all land.

In the eastern part of the CDP is Tonto Creek Camp (formerly Camp Tontozona, the training camp for the Arizona State University football team). There are several cabins and a bar in the vicinity, as well as two Tonto National Forest campgrounds. Kohl's Ranch Lodge is a resort operated by Diamond Resorts.

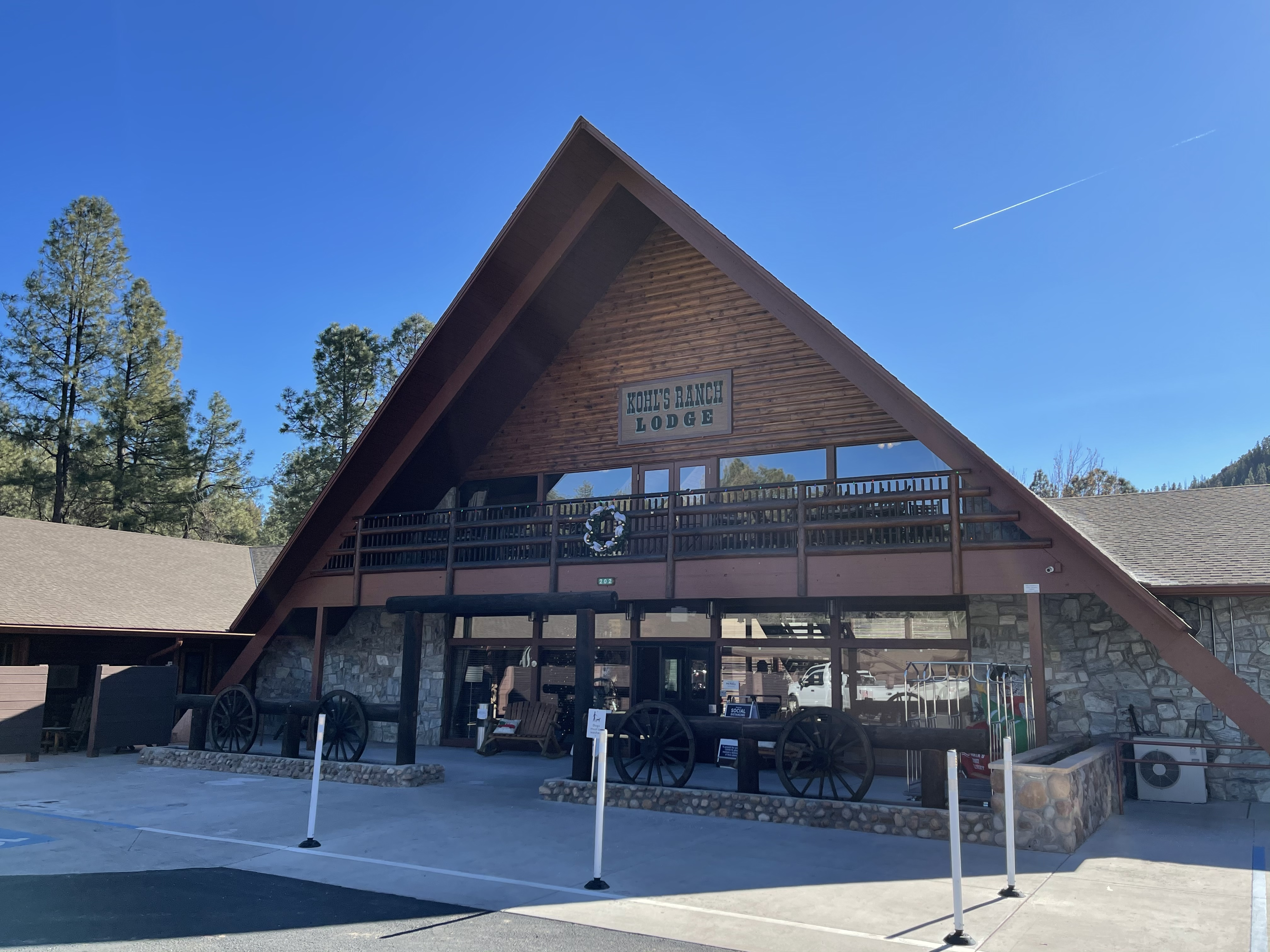
Kohl's Ranch Lodge

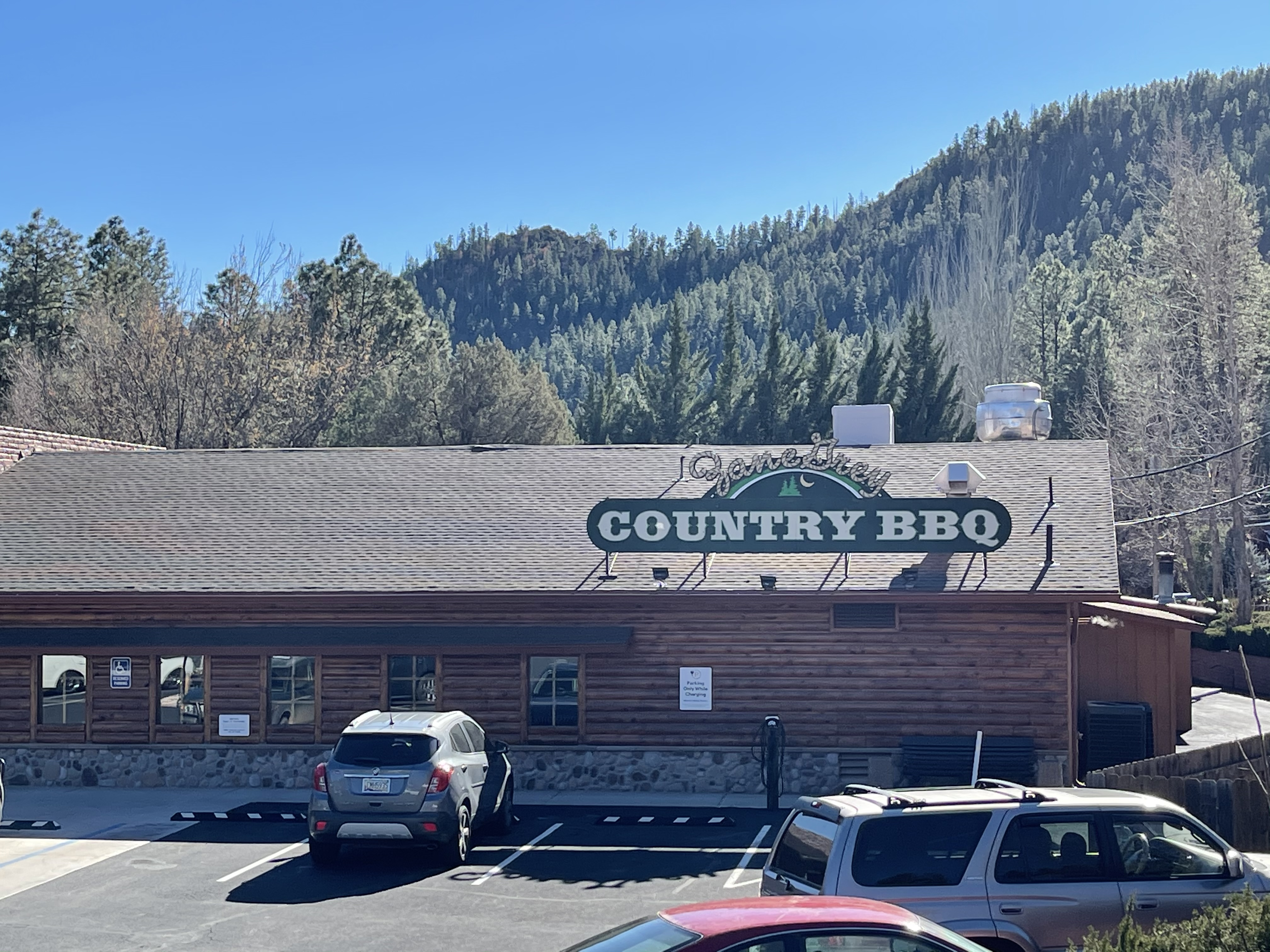
Kohl's Ranch Zane Grey Country BBQ

Historical population
Census	Pop.	Note	%±
2010	46		—
2020	30		−34.8%
U.S. Decennial Census

== Transportation ==
Mountain Valley Shuttle stops in Kohl's Ranch on its Phoenix-Show Low route.

== Education ==
It is in the Payson Unified School District. Payson High School is the zoned comprehensive high school.
