= Oxbow Estates, Arizona =

CDP in Gila County, Arizona

- Census-designated place
- Location within Arizona Location within the United States
- Coordinates: 34°10′59″N 111°20′22″W
- Country: United States
- State: Arizona
- County: Gila

Area
  - Total: 0.49 sq mi (1.28 km^{2})
  - Land: 0.49 sq mi (1.28 km^{2})
  - Water: 0 sq mi (0.00 km^{2})
- Elevation: 4,630 ft (1,410 m)

Population (2020)
  - Total: 198
  - Density: 401.5/sq mi (155.02/km^{2})
- Time zone: UTC-7 (MST (no DST))
- ZIP code: 85541
- Area code: 928
- FIPS code: 04-51775
- GNIS feature ID: 0040844

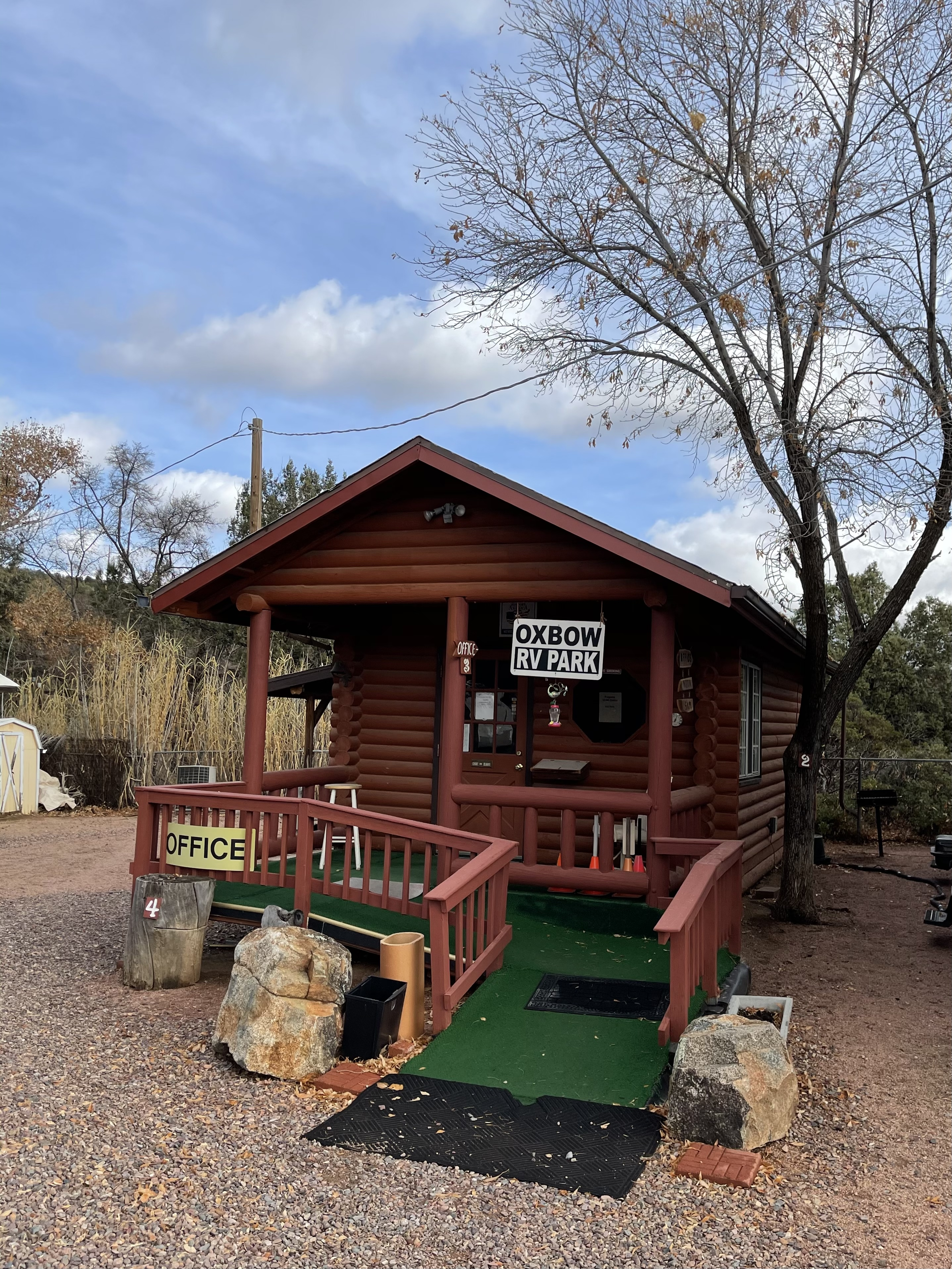
Oxbow Estates, Arizona – RV Park Office

Oxbow Estates is a census-designated place (CDP) in Gila County, Arizona, United States. The population was 217 at the 2010 census.

== Geography ==
The CDP is located in northern Gila County on the west side of Arizona State Route 87 (the Beeline Highway), 4 miles (6 km) south of Payson. It is drained to the west by the seasonally flowing St. Johns Creek, a tributary of Rye Creek and part of the Tonto Creek watershed. According to the United States Census Bureau, the CDP has a total area of 0.49 square miles (1.27 km^{2}), all land.

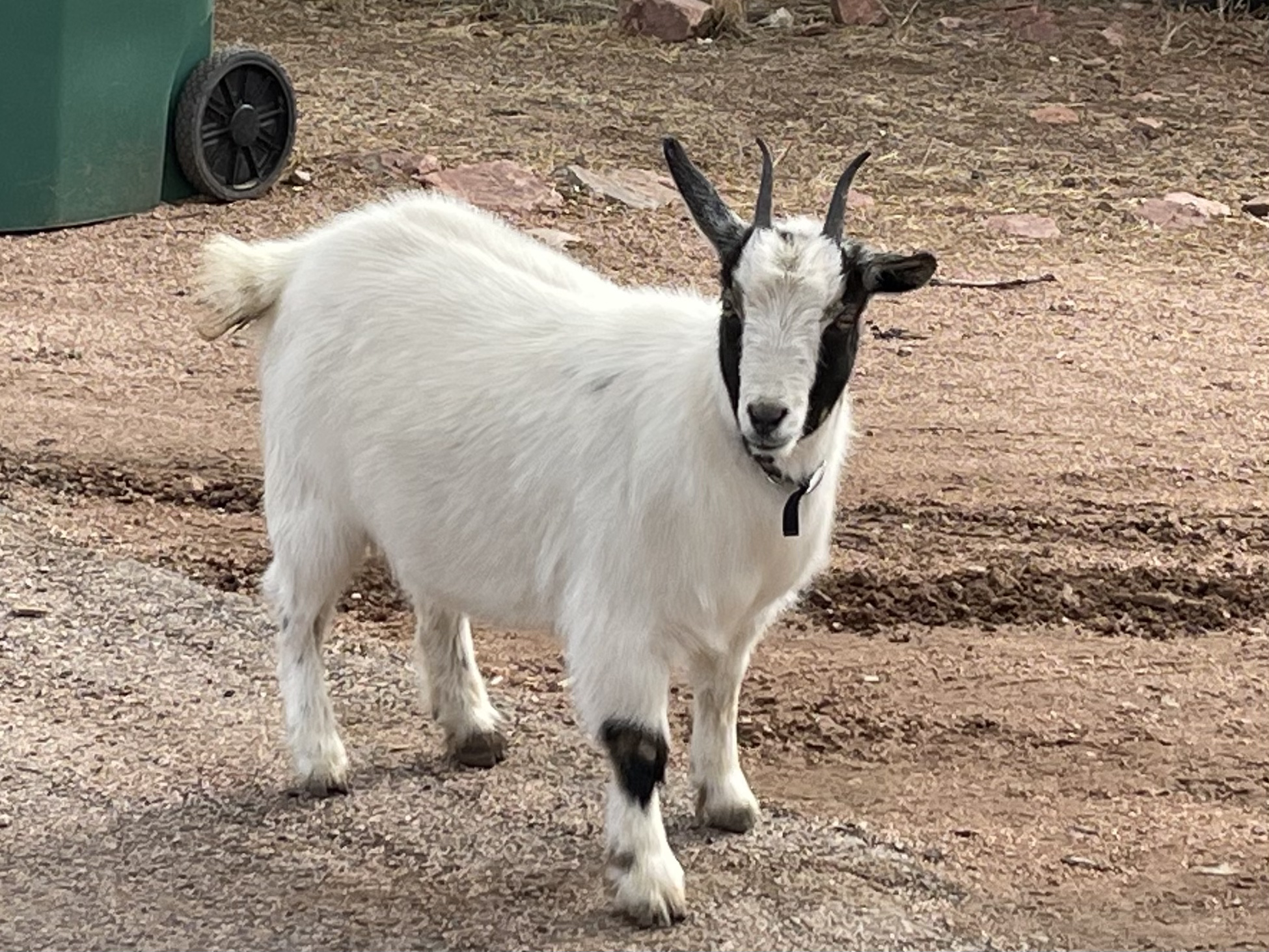
Oxbow Estates, Arizona – Friendly Goat

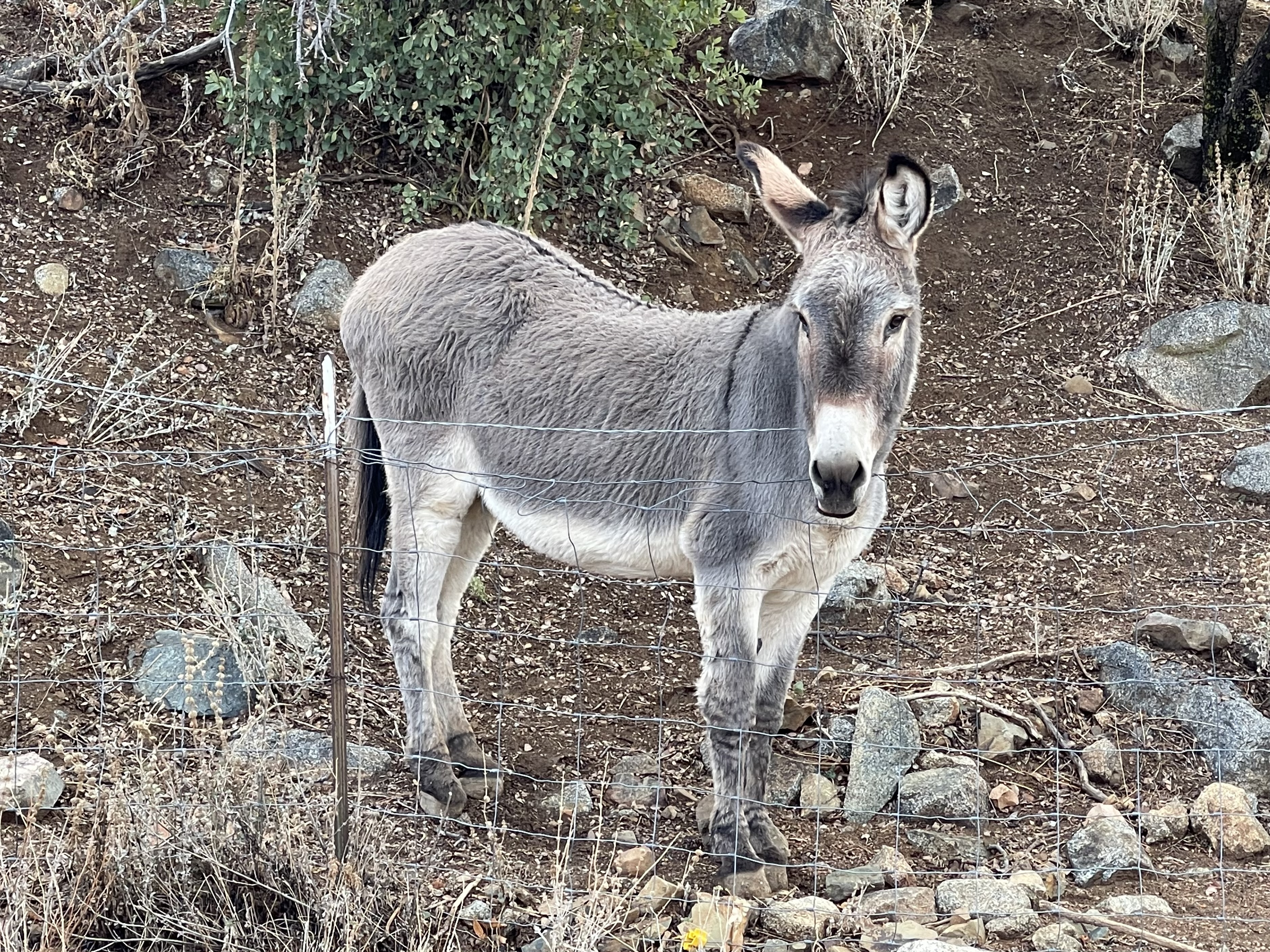
Oxbow Estates, Arizona – Pokey, the Friendly Burro

== Demographics ==
Historical population
Census	Pop.	Note	%±
2020	198		—
U.S. Decennial Census

== Education ==
It is in the Payson Unified School District. Payson High School is the zoned comprehensive high school.
