= Round Valley, Arizona =

CDP in Apache County, Arizona

- Census-designated place
- Location within Arizona Location within the United States
- Coordinates: 34°11′40″N 111°18′31″W
- Country: United States
- State: Arizona
- County: Gila County

Area
  - Total: 4.79 sq mi (12.40 km^{2})
  - Land: 4.79 sq mi (12.40 km^{2})
  - Water: 0 sq mi (0.00 km^{2})
- Elevation: 7,090 ft (2,160 m)

Population (2020)
  - Total: 459
  - Density: 95.9/sq mi (37.03/km^{2})
- Time zone: UTC-7 (MST (no DST))
- ZIP code: 85541
- Area code: 928
- FIPS code: 04-61448
- GNIS feature ID: 2582855

Round Valley is a census-designated place (CDP) in Gila County, Arizona, United States. The population was 487 at the 2010 census.

== Geography ==
The CDP is located in northern Gila County, just south of the town of Payson. Arizona State Route 87, the Beeline Highway, forms the western edge of the CDP and runs north 3 miles (5 km) to the center of Payson. According to the United States Census Bureau, the Round Valley CDP has a total area of 4.8 square miles (12.4 km^{2}), all land.

== Demographics ==
Historical population
Census	Pop.	Note	%±
2020	459		—
U.S. Decennial Census

== History ==
Round Valley was the site of the Gibson Ranch in the late 19th century into the 20th century:

In 1881, Joseph Gibson moved to what is now Round Valley and established a ranch there. He worked as a freighter, mail carrier, and of course, rancher. He was instrumental in establishing a mail service to Gisela and was the first mail carrier to that area. In 1892, Joseph died in Globe due to a crushed leg. His wife, Ruth, sold the ranch at Round Valley to Bill and Harvey Colcord in 1904. Her son, Wash Gibson, later bought it back. Then even later on, Wash's son, Randall Gibson, owned the ranch. Randall branded U Lazy Y.

— Jayne Peace and Jinx Pyle, Payson, AZ town historians, from "Brands: An Important Part Of Western History", http://www.paysonroundup.com/news/2005/jan/04/brands_an_important/

== Education ==
It is in the Payson Unified School District. Payson High School is the zoned comprehensive high school.
