= Rye, Arizona =

CDP in Gila County, Arizona

- Census-designated place
- Location within Arizona Location within the United States
- Coordinates: 34°05′22″N 111°21′15″W
- Country: United States
- State: Arizona
- County: Gila

Area
  - Total: 0.51 sq mi (1.32 km^{2})
  - Land: 0.51 sq mi (1.32 km^{2})
  - Water: 0 sq mi (0.00 km^{2})
- Elevation: 3,133 ft (955 m)

Population (2020)
  - Total: 104
  - Density: 204/sq mi (78.9/km^{2})
- Time zone: UTC-7 (Mountain (MST))
- ZIP code: 85541
- Area code: 928
- GNIS feature ID: 2582856
- FIPS code: 04-61690

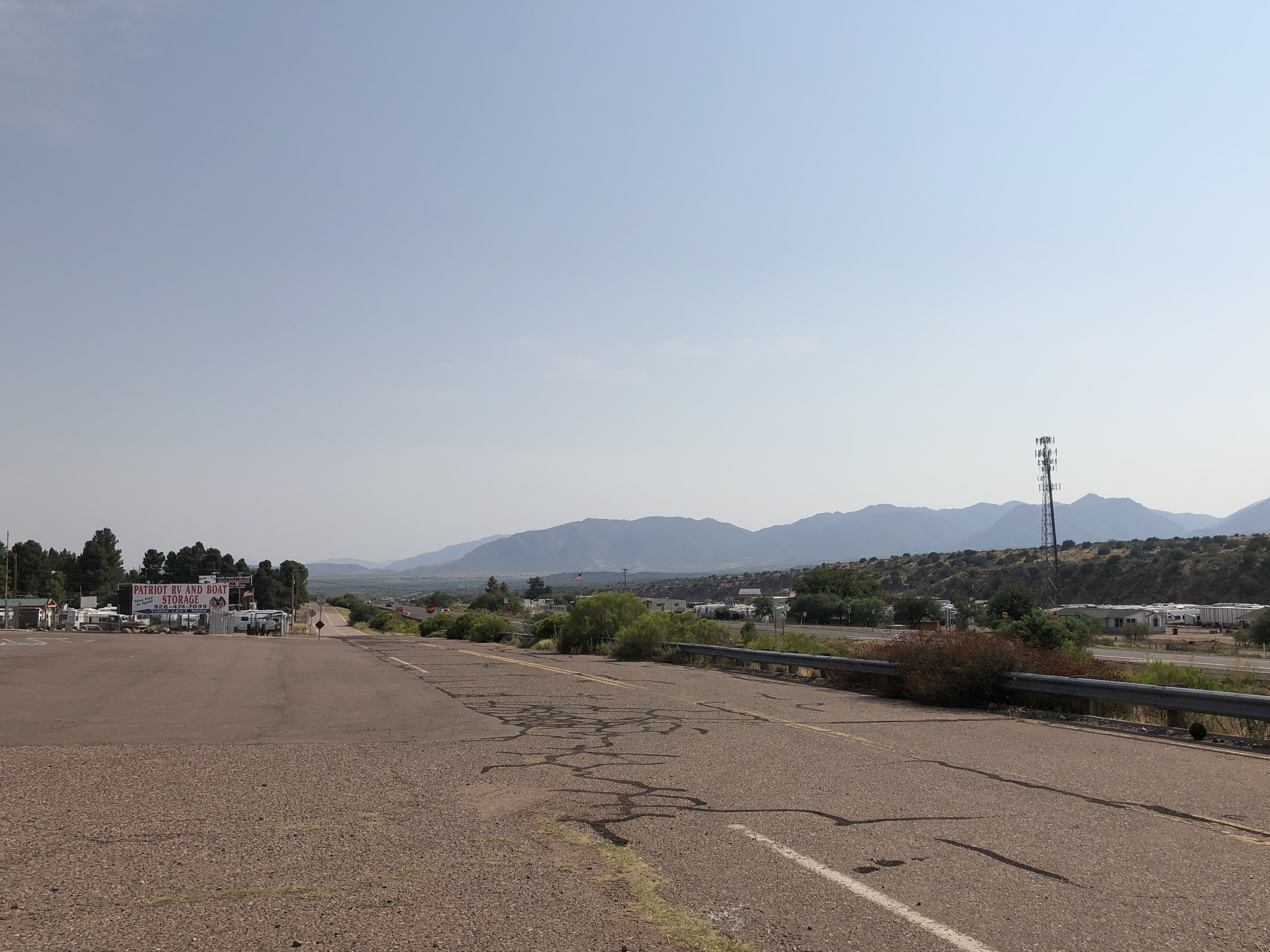
Rye, Arizona is bisected by Arizona State Route 87

Rye is an unincorporated community and census-designated place (CDP) in Gila County, Arizona, United States. As of the 2020 census, it had a population of 104.

Rye is located along Arizona State Route 87, 10 miles (16 km) south of Payson.

== Demographics ==
Historical population
| Census | Pop. | Note | %± |
|---|---|---|---|
| 2020 | 104 | | — |
U.S. Decennial Census

== Education ==
It is in the Payson Unified School District. Payson High School is the zoned comprehensive high school.
