= Payson Unified School District =

School district in Arizona, United States

Location
- Payson, surrounding areas Arizona United States

District information
- Type: Public
- Grades: KG-12
- Superintendent: Linda Gibson
- Schools: 6
- Budget: $22,111,000

Students and staff
- Students: 2,329
- Teachers: 123.24
- Staff: 149.52

Other information
- Website: District Website

Payson Unified School District #10 (PUSD) is a school district in Gila County, Arizona. The district serves Payson, Star Valley, and the Oxbow Estates area. The district consists of six schools; all are title 1 schools.

== Area ==
The district includes: the municipalities of Payson and Star Valley, as well as multiple census-designated places: Bear Flat, Beaver Valley, Christopher Creek, Deer Creek, East Verde Estates, Flowing Springs, Freedom Acres, Geronimo Estates, Gisela, Hunter Creek, Jakes Corner, Kohls Ranch, Mead Ranch, Mesa del Caballo, Oxbow Estates, Round Valley, Rye, Tonto Village, Washington Park, and Whispering Pines.

The Chevelon Butte School District, which covers most of Blue Ridge, does not operate any schools. It sends its Blue Ridge area students to Payson USD for secondary school.

== Schools ==
High schools

- Payson Center for Success High School (alternative, grades 9–12). Enrollment 103 as of 2016–2017. In 2016–17, the school had a student body of 103. The school's colors are green and yellow and the teams are collectively called the Dragons.
- Payson High School (grades 9–12). Enrollment 673 as of 2016–2017.
- Payson Center for Success - Online (grades 7–12). Enrollment 23 as of 2016–2017.

Junior high schools

- Rim Country Middle School (grades 6–8). Enrollment 534 as of 2016–2017.

Elementary schools

- Julia Randall Elementary School (grades 3–5). Enrollment 576 as of 2016–2017.
- Payson Elementary School (grades KG-2). Enrollment 463 as of 2016–2017.
