= Hunter Creek, Arizona =

CDP in Gila County, Arizona

- Census-designated place
- Location within Arizona Location within the United States
- Coordinates: 34°18′18″N 111°0′39″W
- Country: United States
- State: Arizona
- County: Gila

Area
  - Total: 2.20 sq mi (5.70 km^{2})
  - Land: 2.20 sq mi (5.70 km^{2})
  - Water: 0 sq mi (0.00 km^{2})
- Elevation: 5,860 ft (1,790 m)

Population (2020)
  - Total: 51
  - Density: 23.2/sq mi (8.95/km^{2})
- Time zone: UTC-7 (MST (no DST))
- ZIP code: 85541
- Area code: 928
- FIPS code: 04-34700
- GNIS feature ID: 2582799

Hunter Creek is a census-designated place (CDP) in Gila County, Arizona, United States. The population was 48 at the 2010 census.

== Geography ==
Hunter Creek is located in northern Gila County, bordered to the north by the Christopher Creek CDP. Arizona State Route 260 forms the border between the two communities. The namesake Hunter Creek, a tributary of Christopher Creek, flows westward through the southern part of the community. It is part of the Tonto Creek watershed. According to the United States Census Bureau, the CDP has a total area of 2.20 square miles (5.69 km^{2}), all land.

== Demographics ==
Historical population
Census	Pop.	Note	%±
2020	51		—
U.S. Decennial Census

== Education ==
It is in the Payson Unified School District. Payson High School is the zoned comprehensive high school.
