= Mesa del Caballo, Arizona =

CDP in Gila County, Arizona

- Census-designated place
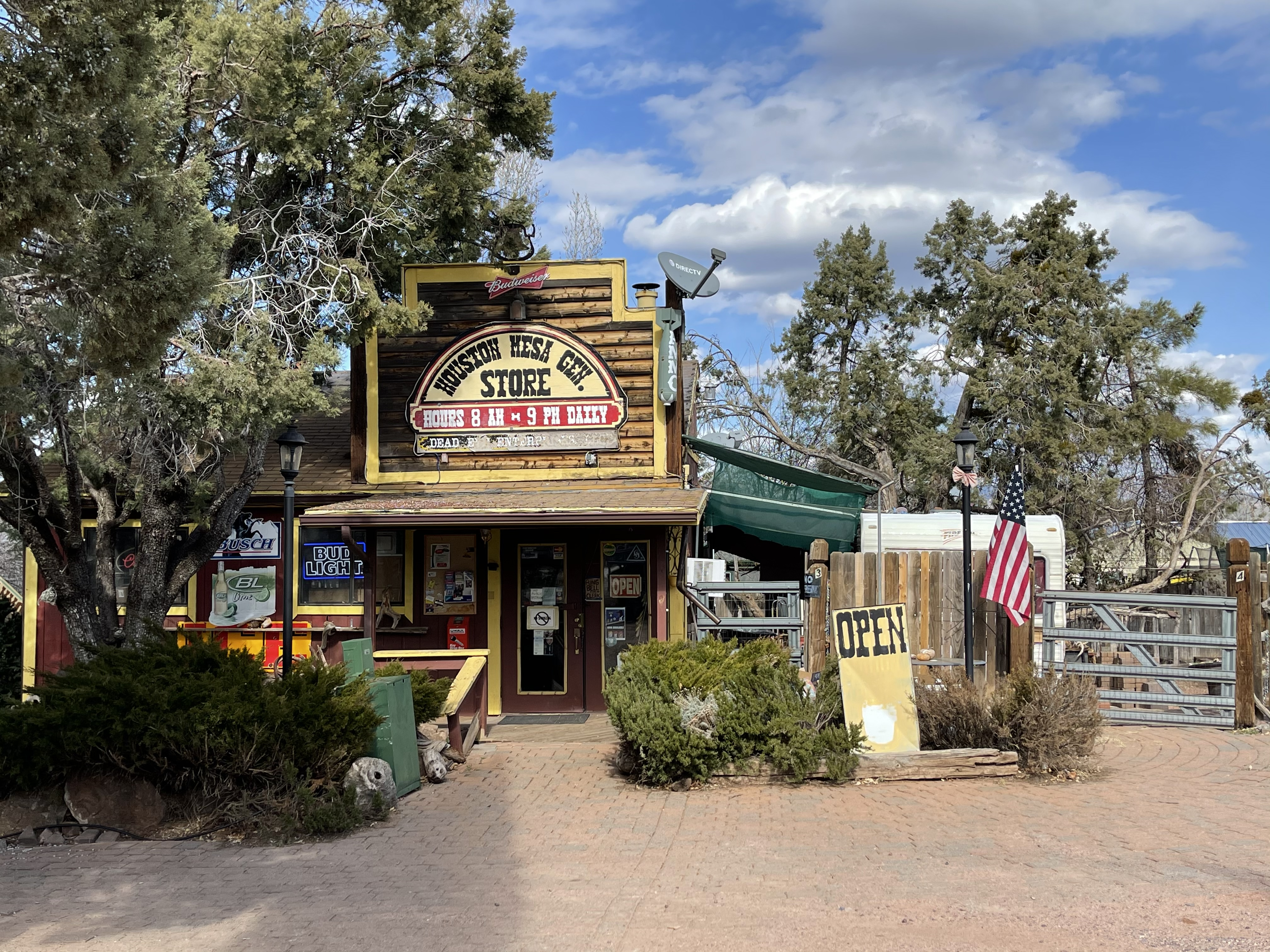
- Houston Mesa General Store at the intersection of Deadeye Road and Houston Mesa Road

- Location within Arizona Location within the United States
- Coordinates: 34°17′8″N 111°17′39″W
- Country: United States
- State: Arizona
- County: Gila

Area
  - Total: 0.32 sq mi (0.82 km^{2})
  - Land: 0.32 sq mi (0.82 km^{2})
  - Water: 0 sq mi (0.00 km^{2})
- Elevation: 5,170 ft (1,580 m)

Population (2020)
  - Total: 781
  - Density: 2,450/sq mi (947/km^{2})
- Time zone: UTC-7 (MST (no DST))
- ZIP code: 85541
- Area code: 928
- FIPS code: 04-46005
- GNIS feature ID: 40822

Mesa del Caballo is a census-designated place (CDP) in Gila County, Arizona, United States. The population was 765 at the 2010 census.

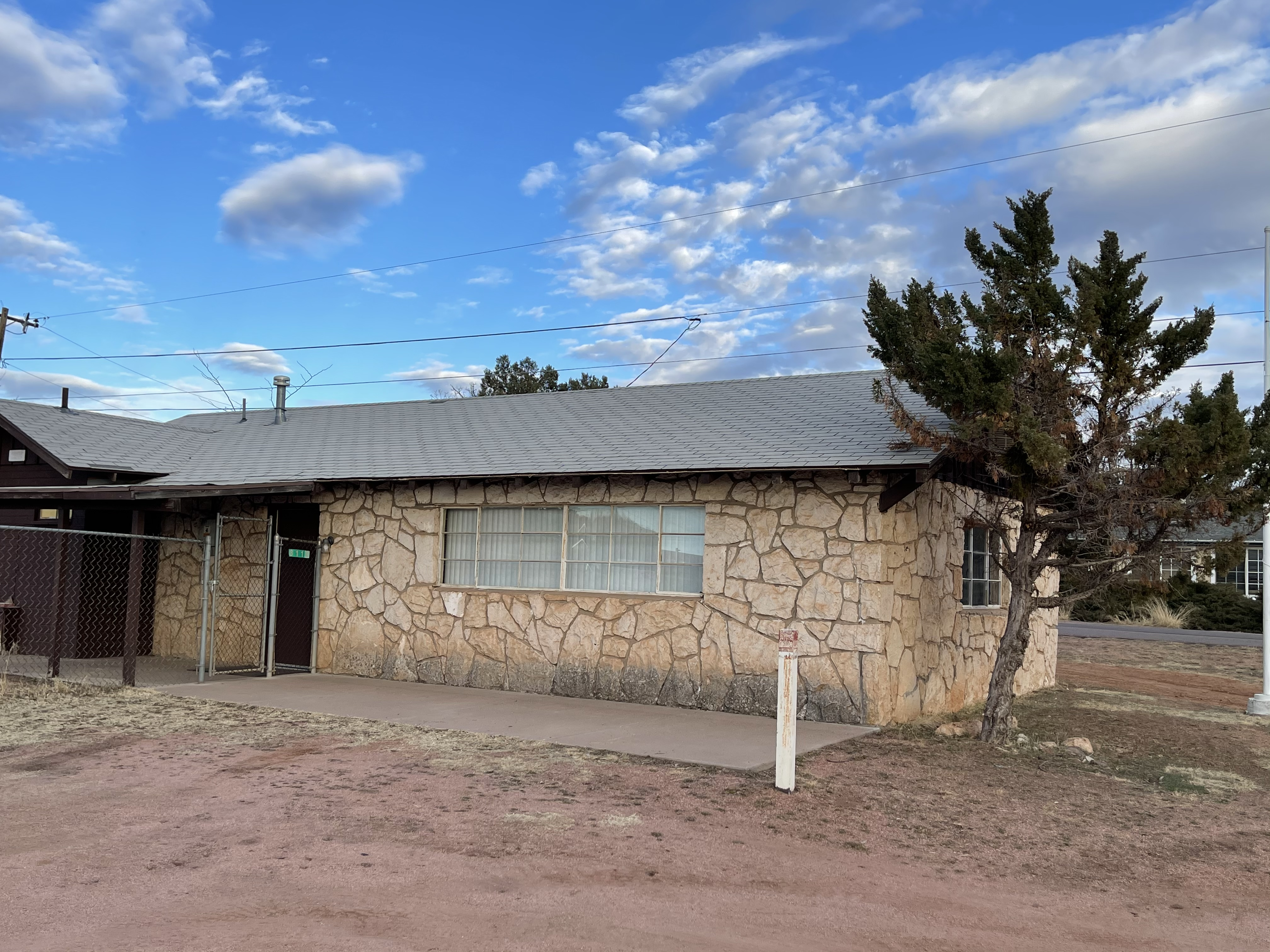
Mesa Del Caballo, Arizona community center

== Geography ==
The CDP is located in northern Gila County atop Houston Mesa, a low ridge north of Payson. The center of Payson is 5 miles (8 km) south via Houston Mesa Road and Arizona State Route 87. According to the United States Census Bureau, the CDP has a total area of 0.32 square miles (0.82 km^{2}), all land.

== Transportation ==
The Payson Senior Center operates the Beeline Bus, which provides local bus service between Payson and Mesa del Caballo.

== Education ==
It is in the Payson Unified School District. Payson High School is the zoned comprehensive high school.

== Demographics ==
Historical population
Census	Pop.	Note	%±
2020	781		—
U.S. Decennial Census
