= Washington Park, Arizona =

CDP in Gila County, Arizona

- Census-designated place
- Location within Arizona Location within the United States
- Coordinates: 34°24′26″N 111°16′2″W
- Country: United States
- State: Arizona
- County: Gila

Area
  - Total: 2.62 sq mi (6.79 km^{2})
  - Land: 2.62 sq mi (6.79 km^{2})
  - Water: 0 sq mi (0.00 km^{2})
- Elevation: 5,600 ft (1,700 m)

Population (2020)
  - Total: 85
  - Density: 32.4/sq mi (12.52/km^{2})
- Time zone: UTC-7 (MST (no DST))
- ZIP code: 85541
- Area code: 928
- FIPS code: 04-81175
- GNIS feature ID: 2582897

Washington Park is a census-designated place (CDP) in Gila County, Arizona, United States. The population was 85 in the 2020 census, and 70 at the 2010 United States census.

== Geography ==
Tonto Village is located in northern Gila County in the valley of the upper reaches of the East Verde River, just below (south of) the Mogollon Rim. It is 17 miles (27 km) north of Payson via Houston Mesa Road and Belluzzi Boulevard. According to the United States Census Bureau, the CDP has a total area of 2.6 square miles (6.8 km^{2}), all land.

== Demographics ==
Historical population
Census	Pop.	Note	%±
2020	85		—
U.S. Decennial Census

== Education ==
It is in the Payson Unified School District. Payson High School is the zoned comprehensive high school.
