= Beaver Valley, Arizona =

CDP in Gila County, Arizona

- Census-designated place
- Location of Beaver Valley in Gila County, Arizona.

- Location within Arizona Location within the United States
- Coordinates: 34°20′27″N 111°17′55″W
- Country: United States
- State: Arizona
- County: Gila

Area
  - Total: 1.51 sq mi (3.90 km^{2})
  - Land: 1.50 sq mi (3.89 km^{2})
  - Water: 0 sq mi (0.00 km^{2})
- Elevation: 4,954 ft (1,510 m)

Population (2020)
  - Total: 226
  - Density: 150.3/sq mi (58.04/km^{2})
- Time zone: UTC-7 (Mountain (MST))
- ZIP code: 85541
- Area code: 928
- GNIS feature ID: 2582737

Beaver Valley is a census-designated place in Gila County in the state of Arizona. Beaver Valley is located about 10 miles north of the town of Payson. The population, as of the 2010 U.S. census, was 231.

== Geography ==
Beaver Valley is located at 34.342985°N 111.300023°W.

According to the U.S. Census Bureau, the community has an area of 1.504 square miles (3.90 km^{2}); 1.503 square miles (3.89 km^{2}) of its area is land, and 0.001 square miles (0.0026 km^{2}) is water.

== Demographics ==
Historical population
Census	Pop.	Note	%±
2010	231		—
2020	226		−2.2%
U.S. Decennial Census

Beaver Valley first appeared on the 2010 U.S. Census as a census-designated place (CDP).

== Education ==
It is in the Payson Unified School District. Payson High School is the zoned comprehensive high school.
