= East Verde River =

River in Arizona, United States

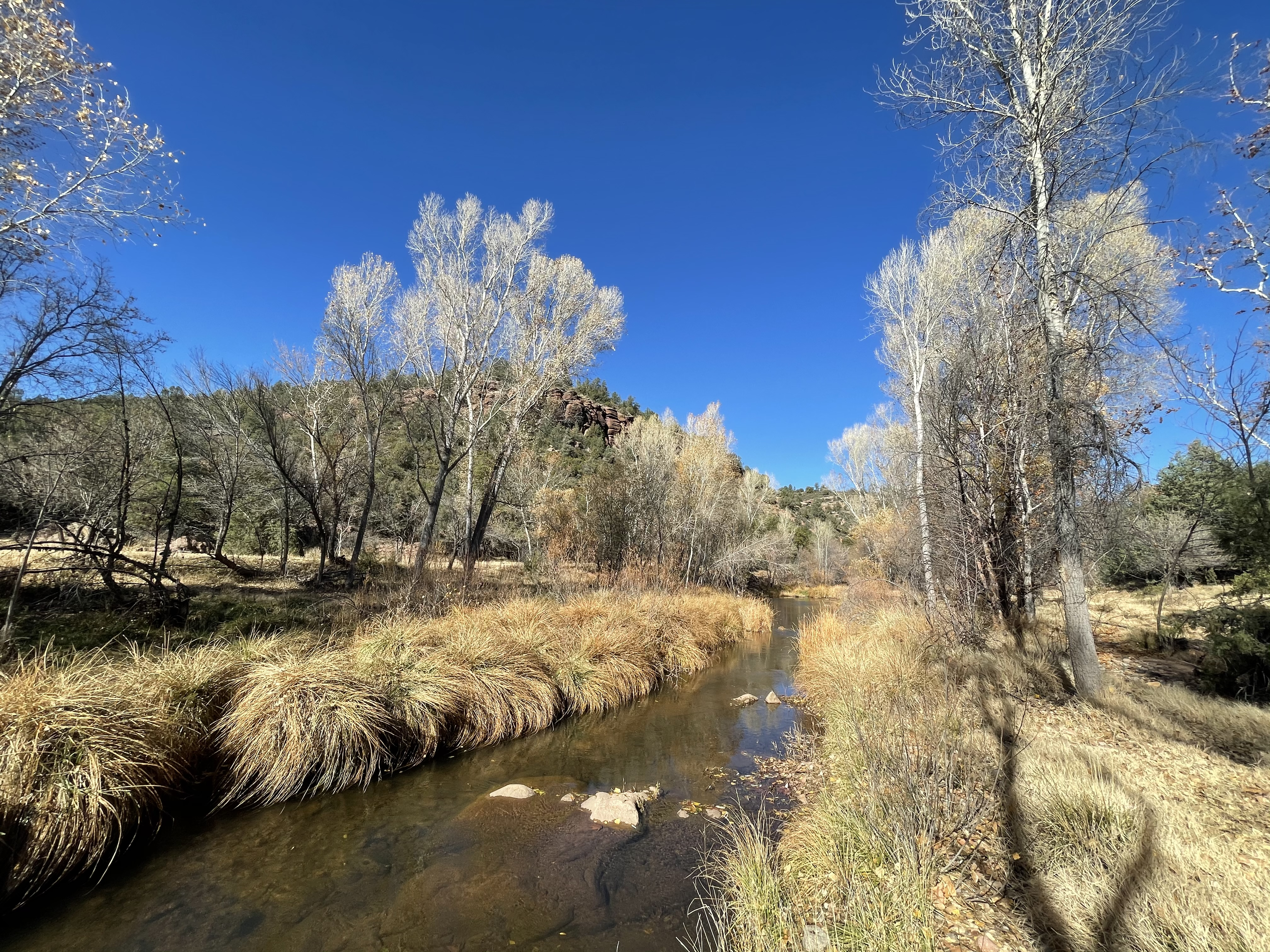

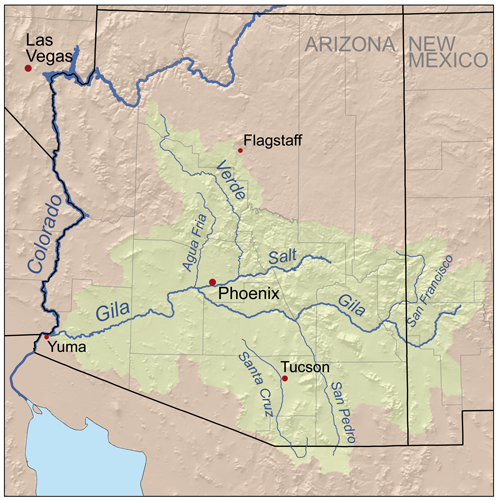
- Gila River basin, including Verde River

Location
- Country: United States
- State: Arizona
- Region: Gila County
- City: Payson (town)

Physical characteristics
- Source: Mogollon Rim
  - location: near Washington Park, Tonto National Forest
  - coordinates: 34°27′01″N 111°15′08″W
  - elevation: 7,003 ft (2,135 m)
- Mouth: Verde River
  - location: near Cedar Bench, Tonto National Forest
  - coordinates: 34°17′11″N 111°39′54″W
  - elevation: 2,470 ft (750 m)
- Basin size: 331 sq mi (860 km^{2})
- Discharge
  - location: near Childs, 1.6 miles (2.6 km) from mouth
  - minimum: 0 cu ft/s (0 m^{3}/s)
  - maximum: 23,500 cu ft/s (670 m^{3}/s)

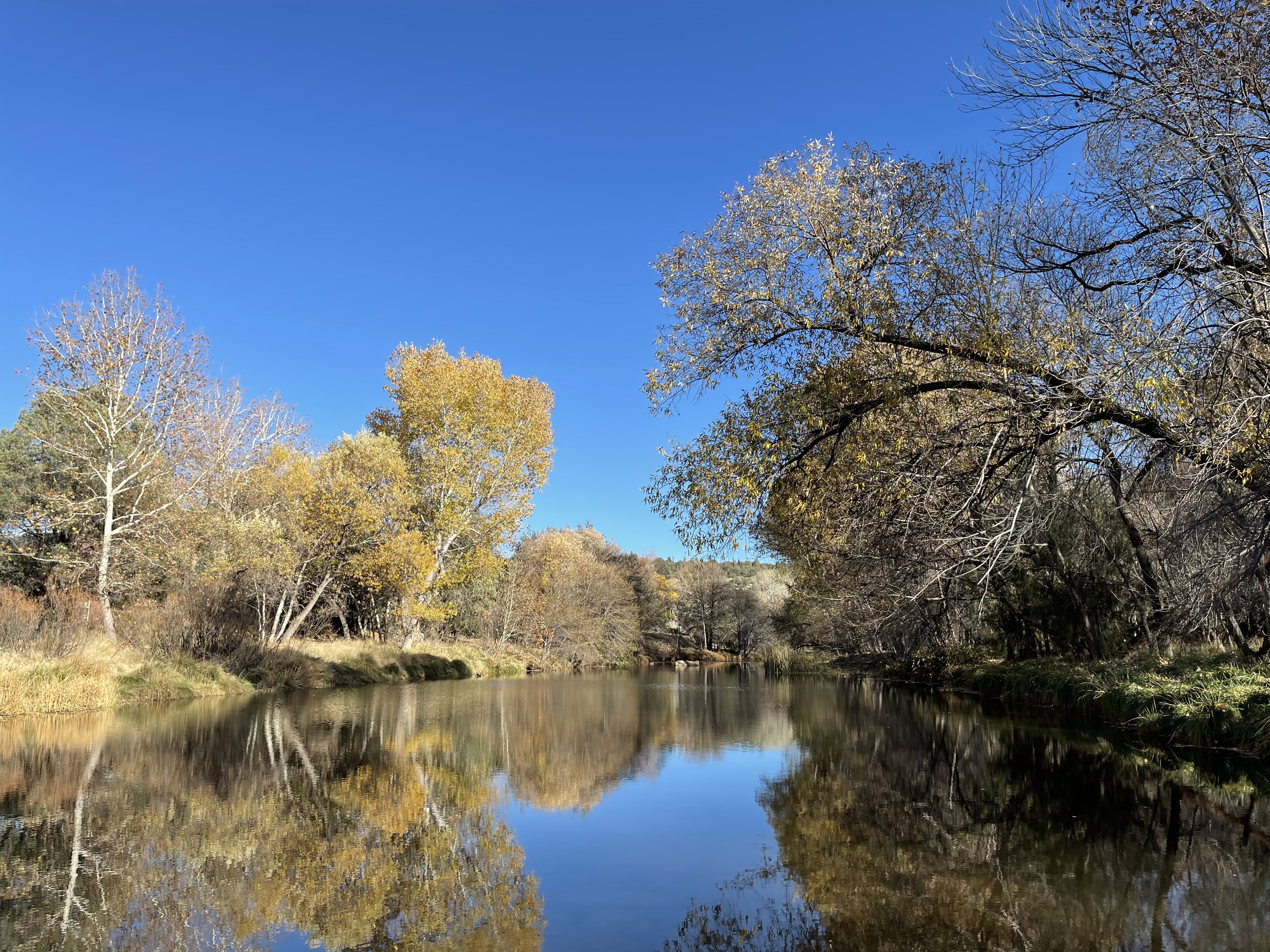
The East Verde River as it flows thru the East Verde Estates northwest of Payson

The East Verde River is a tributary of the Verde River in the U.S. state of Arizona. Beginning on the Mogollon Rim near Washington Park, it flows generally southwest through Gila County and the Tonto National Forest northeast of Phoenix. Near the middle of its course, it passes to within about 5 miles (8 km) of Payson, which is southeast of the river. The East Verde River flows through parts of the Mazatzal Wilderness west of Payson.

The Salt River Project (SRP) supplements the natural flows on the East Verde River with water pumped from Blue Ridge Reservoir on East Clear Creek in Coconino County. The water travels 17 miles (27 km) by pipeline to the East Verde at Washington Park, from whence it flows toward the Verde River and the SRP reservoir behind Horseshoe Dam. A significant fraction of the Blue Ridge water release of 11,000 acre-feet (14,000,000 m^{3}) a year is allocated to communities along or near the East Verde River. The U.S. Congress has set aside 3,000 acre-feet (3,700,000 m^{3}) a year for Payson and 500 acre-feet (620,000 m^{3}) for other northern Gila County communities.

== Fish ==
The Arizona Game and Fish Department lists the following fish species among those living in the East Verde River: rainbow trout, brown trout, smallmouth bass, and sunfish.
