= Payson, Arizona =

Town in Gila County, Arizona

- Town
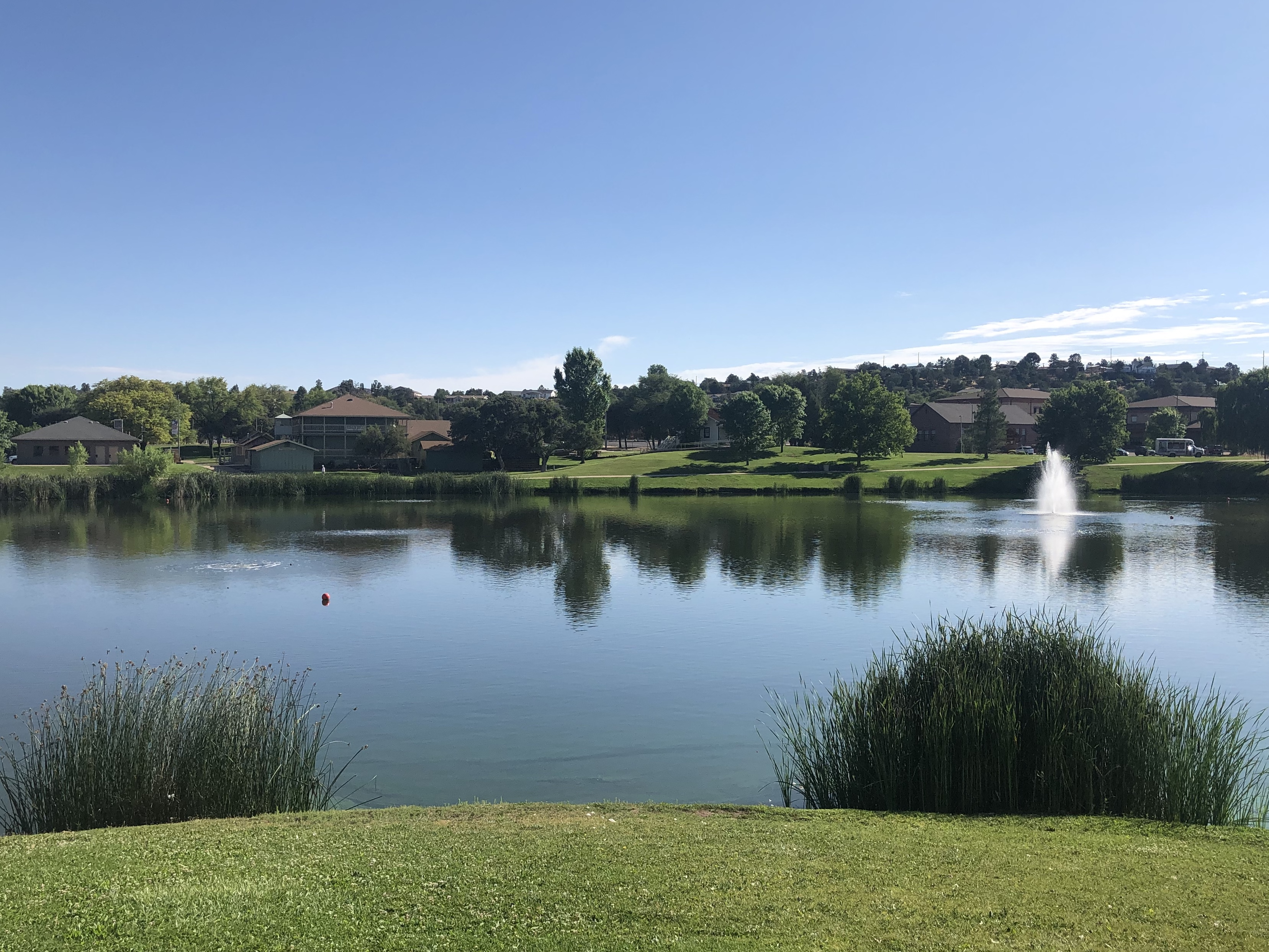
- Green Valley Park
- Motto: "Arizona's Cool Mountain Town"
- Location of Payson in Gila County, Arizona

- Location in Arizona Location in United States Location in North America
- Coordinates: 34°14′22″N 111°19′39″W
- Country: United States
- State: Arizona
- County: Gila
- Incorporated: 1973

Government
  - Type: Council-manager
  - Body: Payson Town Council
  - Mayor: Steve Otto

Area
  - Total: 19.36 sq mi (50.13 km^{2})
  - Land: 19.35 sq mi (50.11 km^{2})
  - Water: 0.0077 sq mi (0.02 km^{2})
- Elevation: 5,000 ft (1,524 m)

Population (2020)
  - Total: 16,351
  - Density: 845/sq mi (326.3/km^{2})
- Time zone: UTC-7 (MST (no DST))
- ZIP codes: 85541, 85547
- Area code: 928
- FIPS code: 04-53700
- GNIS ID(s): 32746, 2413121
- Website: www.paysonaz.gov

Payson (Navajo: Ndzistsooí) is a town in northern Gila County, Arizona, United States. Due to Payson's location being very near to the geographic center of Arizona, it has been called "The Heart of Arizona." Payson is also considered part of the colloquially defined Northern Arizona region, and the town serves as a gateway to the vast wilderness of the Colorado Plateau. The town is surrounded by the Tonto National Forest, the largest of the six national forests in Arizona—and the ninth largest national forest in the United States.

Payson boasts a lively festival calendar, including The World's Oldest Continuous Rodeo established in 1884, as well as the Arizona State Old Time Fiddlin' Championship, which celebrates the area's musical heritage.

As of the 2020 census, the population of Payson was 16,361.

== History ==
Prior to the arrival of European-American settlers, the area was known as Te-go-suk—or Place of the Yellow Water—by the Dilzhe'e Apache. The area was also historically inhabited by the Yavapai and other Oasisamerican peoples, including the Hohokam, Mogollon, Salado, and Sinagua cultures.

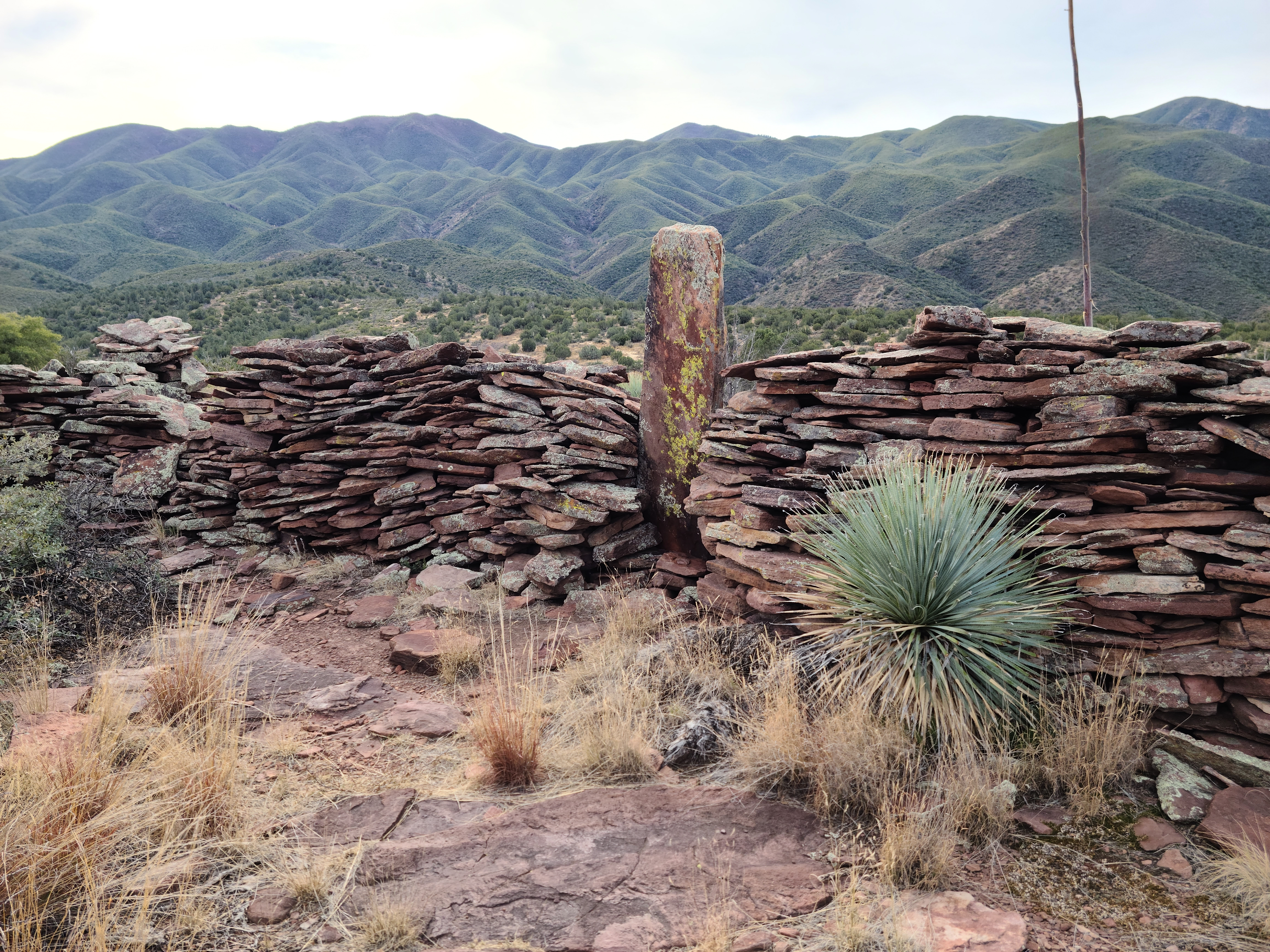
Oasisamerican archaeological site west of Payson.

In 1882, considered to be the founding year of Payson, area settlers—led by Henry Sidles, John and Lucy Hise, and James Callaghan—established a logging, mining, and ranching hamlet called "Union Park." The settlement was also known as "Green Valley."

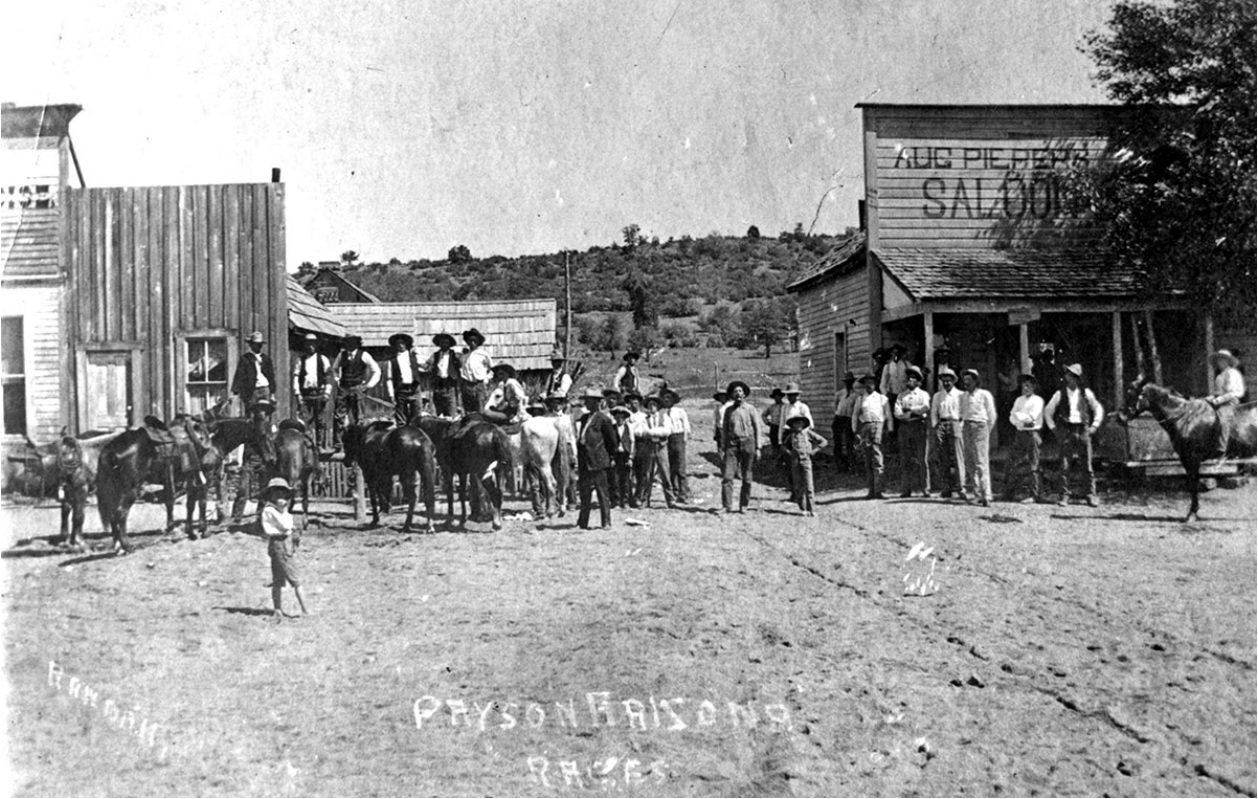
Payson as it appeared in the 1890s.

That same year, the Battle of Big Dry Wash—fought between troops of the United States Army's 3rd Cavalry Regiment, 6th Cavalry Regiment, and members of the White Mountain Apache Tribe—took place just north of town on the Mogollon Rim. The battle occurred within the greater context of the Apache Wars.

On March 3, 1884, a post office was built in Union Park with the help of Illinois Representative Levi Joseph Payson. In honor of the representative's help, the town's name was changed to "Payson".

Payson held its first rodeo in 1884. The town declares the competition to be the world's oldest and continuous rodeo as it has been held every year since.

In 1918, author Zane Grey made his first trip to the area surrounding Payson. He would visit with regularity through 1929, and he purchased two plots of land near Tonto Creek, including 120 acres (49 ha) from Sampson Elam Boles under Myrtle Point. Grey wrote numerous books about the area, and he also filmed movies in the area, such as To the Last Man. A replica of his cabin is located in Green Valley park.

During Prohibition, the manufacture, sale, and distribution of liquor was plentiful in Payson. These transactions took place on historic Bootleg Alley. "Payson Dew", brewed across 30 to 40 stills in the Payson area, was coveted from as far away as Los Angeles. The drink helped to reinvigorate Payson's economy.

During the 1930s, an effort was initiated to better connect Payson to the outside world through the construction of roads and highways. At that time, the town was very isolated—with a trip from Phoenix to Payson taking eight to twelve hours. Throughout the 1950s, work progressed on a paved road from Phoenix to Payson, and the road was completed in 1958. The highway, State Route 87 (also known as the "Beeline Highway"), was later expanded to four lanes.

Payson was officially incorporated in 1973.

=== Ellison Creek and East Verde River flooding ===
On July 15, 2017, heavy rains from upstream of the creek and river caused the waterways to swell, subsequently leading to downstream flooding. This flash flood crucially affected the popular Water Wheel swimming hole where 10 people were killed and 4 others were injured.

== Geography ==
Payson is located in northern Gila County—within the hilly and mountainous terrain of the Arizona transition zone. The town sits at an elevation of 5,000 feet (1,500 m), and it has a total area of 19.5 square miles (51 km^{2}). The Mogollon Rim, the southern boundary of the Colorado Plateau, lies to the north of Payson, with elevations exceeding 7,500 feet (2,300 m). There are several cold water lakes on top of the rim; they are stocked with fish by the Arizona Game and Fish Department.

Payson is adjacent to the sovereign land of the Tonto Apache Tribe, and it is bordered to the east by the town of Star Valley. Other nearby communities are Pine, Strawberry, Gisela, Rye, Round Valley, and Oxbow Estates, all within Gila County. Globe, the Gila County seat, is 80 miles (130 km) to the south via State Routes 87 and 188. State Route 87, the Beeline Highway, leads 90 miles (140 km) southwest to Phoenix and 90 miles (140 km) northeast to Winslow. State Route 260 leads 90 miles (140 km) east to Show Low.

=== Zane Grey Country ===
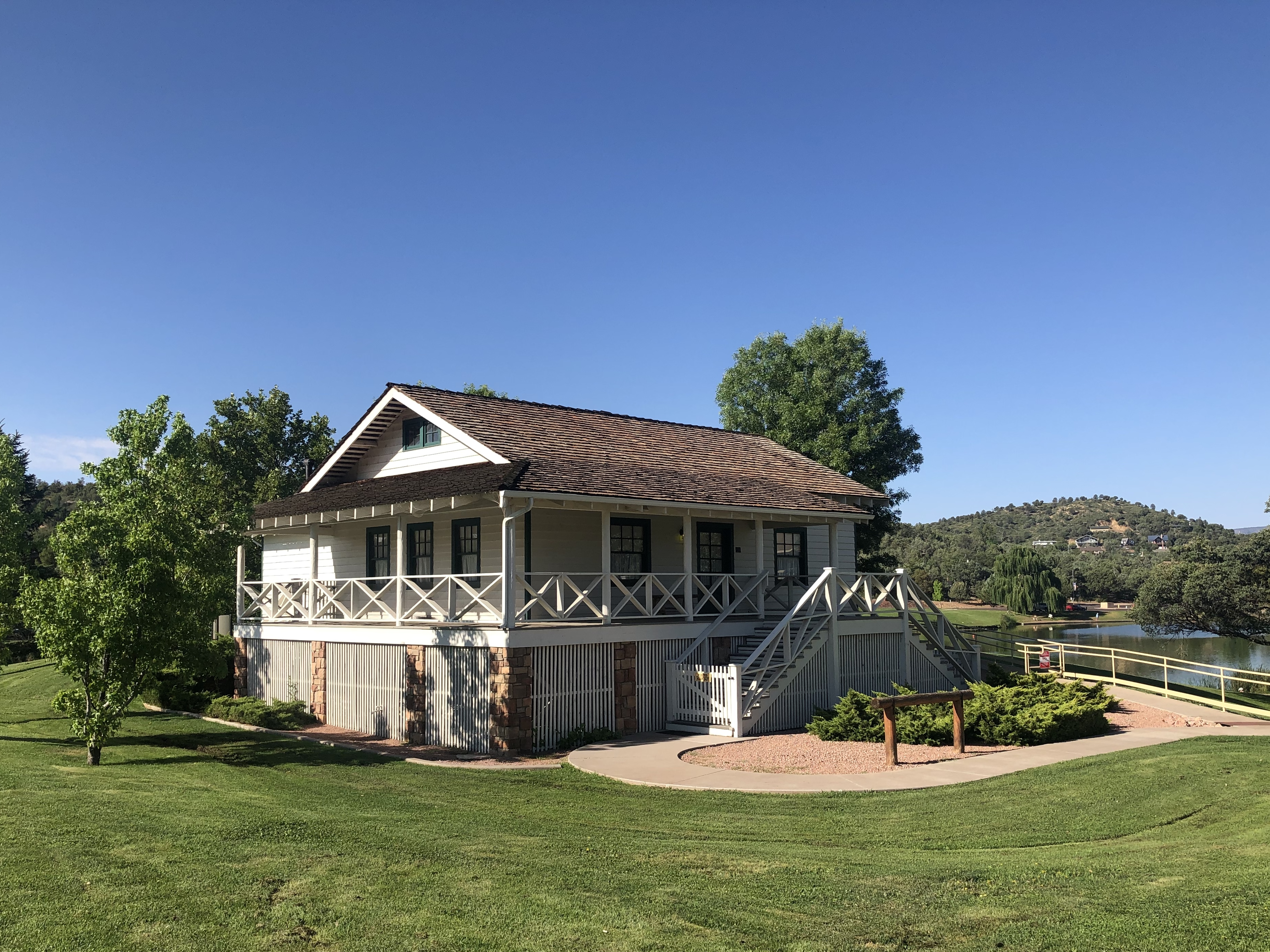
Zane Grey cabin replica. Zane Grey had a cabin under the Mogollon Rim near Payson.

"Zane Grey Country" is a term for the area around Payson. This term was most often used in the 1970s and 1980s, and appeared in the header of the local newspaper, the Payson Roundup. In recent times, it has fallen somewhat out of favor, as the term "Rim Country" has become more popular among locals.

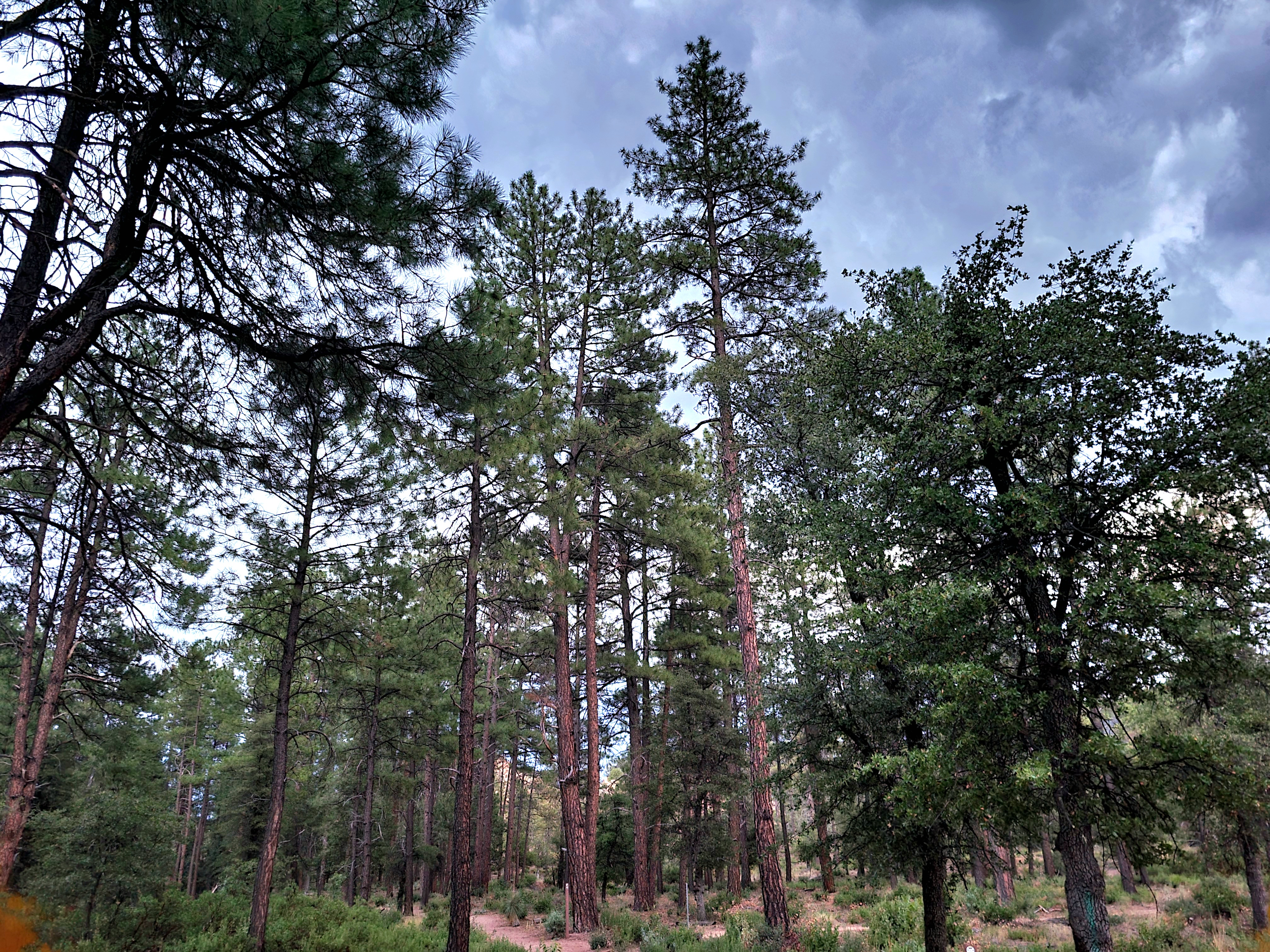
Cypress Trail in southeast Payson.

== Climate ==
Owing to its elevation of 5,000 feet (1,500 m), Payson is in a transitional area between a hot-summer Mediterranean climate (Köppen Csa) and a cold semi-arid climate (Köppen BSk). The town straddles USDA Hardiness Zone 7b and 8a, and it is surrounded by high desert pinyon-juniper woodlands, ponderosa pine, and the mixed conifer forests of the Mogollon Rim escarpment.

Winter consists of mild, breezy days and cold nights. In December and January, nighttime lows typically fall below 32 °F (0 °C)—with the coldest nights of the year falling below 20 °F (−7 °C). By mid-afternoon, however, average daytime temperatures surpass 50 °F (10 °C). While most winter precipitation falls as rain, Payson receives an average of 18.5 inches (470 mm) of snow each year, spread across six days of measurable snowfall. Snow melts rapidly, and any lingering snow cover is minimal. In December 1967, Payson experienced a record-breaking snowfall, with more than 6 feet (1.8 m) of snow falling over eight days. Locally referred to as the "Storm of the Century," the 1967 event caused immense disruption and damage in the area—downing trees, toppling power lines, and caving in roofs.

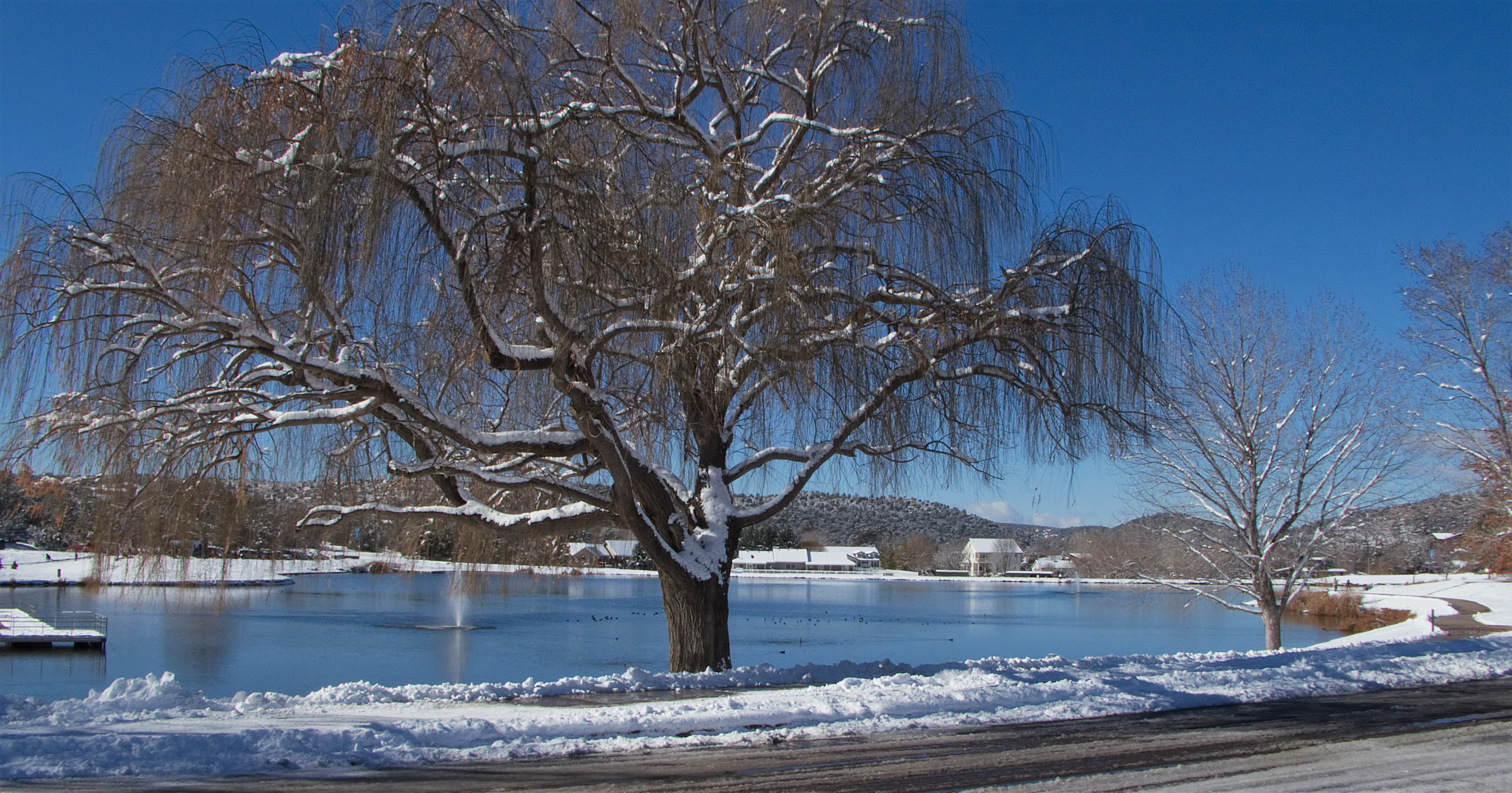
Town lake in snow

Spring weather in Payson is windy and highly variable—with warm, dry conditions intermixed with sporadic precipitation. Colorful wildflowers are common in the spring.

While average summer daytime temperatures climb above 90 °F (32 °C), the town's elevation keeps it protected from the extreme heat found in Arizona's lowland deserts. Early summer is characterized by hot and dry weather, with elevated wildfire risk, whereas mid-to-late summer is tempered by the North American Monsoon. The monsoon brings frequent, sometimes severe thunderstorms with heavy rain, strong winds, hail, and flash floods. On average, Payson receives 7 inches (180 mm) of monsoonal moisture—approximately 35% of its annual precipitation—across the months of July, August, and September.

Autumn is characterized by stable weather and gradually cooling temperatures. Fall foliage peaks from mid-October through early November, and colors are most vibrant in the escarpment canyons of the Mogollon Rim and nearby riparian zones.

Diurnal temperature variation is large throughout the year.

Climate data for Payson, Arizona (1991–2020 normals, extremes 1940–present)
Month	Jan	Feb	Mar	Apr	May	Jun	Jul	Aug	Sep	Oct	Nov	Dec	Year
Record high °F (°C)	77 (25)	80 (27)	89 (32)	91 (33)	99 (37)	106 (41)	107 (42)	104 (40)	103 (39)	94 (34)	83 (28)	77 (25)	107 (42)
Mean maximum °F (°C)	66.9 (19.4)	68.4 (20.2)	75.6 (24.2)	82.9 (28.3)	90.2 (32.3)	97.8 (36.6)	99.8 (37.7)	97.6 (36.4)	92.9 (33.8)	86.3 (30.2)	75.3 (24.1)	66.9 (19.4)	101.1 (38.4)
Mean daily maximum °F (°C)	56.1 (13.4)	58.5 (14.7)	65.1 (18.4)	71.6 (22.0)	80.0 (26.7)	90.2 (32.3)	92.5 (33.6)	90.5 (32.5)	85.9 (29.9)	75.9 (24.4)	64.3 (17.9)	54.9 (12.7)	73.8 (23.2)
Daily mean °F (°C)	41.0 (5.0)	43.0 (6.1)	48.4 (9.1)	53.8 (12.1)	61.4 (16.3)	70.5 (21.4)	76.0 (24.4)	74.8 (23.8)	68.9 (20.5)	58.3 (14.6)	47.7 (8.7)	40.2 (4.6)	57.0 (13.9)
Mean daily minimum °F (°C)	26.0 (−3.3)	27.7 (−2.4)	31.6 (−0.2)	36.0 (2.2)	42.8 (6.0)	50.8 (10.4)	59.5 (15.3)	59.2 (15.1)	51.9 (11.1)	40.6 (4.8)	31.0 (−0.6)	25.6 (−3.6)	40.2 (4.6)
Mean minimum °F (°C)	14.0 (−10.0)	17.9 (−7.8)	21.3 (−5.9)	26.3 (−3.2)	33.5 (0.8)	41.4 (5.2)	51.0 (10.6)	52.2 (11.2)	41.9 (5.5)	30.2 (−1.0)	19.5 (−6.9)	14.5 (−9.7)	11.7 (−11.3)
Record low °F (°C)	−8 (−22)	1 (−17)	3 (−16)	15 (−9)	22 (−6)	31 (−1)	39 (4)	37 (3)	33 (1)	16 (−9)	6 (−14)	−9 (−23)	−9 (−23)
Average precipitation inches (mm)	2.27 (58)	2.33 (59)	1.89 (48)	0.82 (21)	0.54 (14)	0.21 (5.3)	2.81 (71)	2.60 (66)	1.54 (39)	1.26 (32)	1.48 (38)	2.09 (53)	19.84 (504)
Average snowfall inches (cm)	4.7 (12)	4.9 (12)	2.0 (5.1)	2.0 (5.1)	0.0 (0.0)	0.0 (0.0)	0.0 (0.0)	0.0 (0.0)	0.0 (0.0)	0.0 (0.0)	1.3 (3.3)	3.6 (9.1)	18.5 (47)
Average precipitation days (≥ 0.01 inch)	5.3	5.8	5.0	3.0	2.6	1.4	8.8	11.1	5.0	4.3	3.9	5.6	61.8
Average snowy days (≥ 0.1 inch)	1.6	1.3	0.8	0.4	0.0	0.0	0.0	0.0	0.0	0.0	0.5	1.3	5.9
Source 1: NOAA
Source 2: National Weather Service

== Demographics ==
Historical population
Census	Pop.	Note	%±
1970	1,787		—
1980	5,068		183.6%
1990	8,377		65.3%
2000	13,620		62.6%
2010	15,301		12.3%
2020	16,351		6.9%
U.S. Decennial Census

=== Racial and ethnic composition ===
Payson town, Arizona – Racial composition
Race (NH = Non-Hispanic)	2020	2010	2000	1990	1980
White alone (NH)	81% (13,247)	85.8% (13,126)	91.3% (12,438)	96% (8,038)	94.9% (4,809)
Black alone (NH)	0.4% (62)	0.3% (50)	0.2% (30)	0.1% (7)	0% (0)
American Indian alone (NH)	2.3% (375)	2.2% (332)	1.7% (235)	0.5% (45)	0.9% (48)
Asian alone (NH)	0.9% (145)	0.6% (98)	0.5% (72)	0.3% (27)	0% (0)
Pacific Islander alone (NH)	0.1% (17)	0.1% (13)	0.1% (7)		
Other race alone (NH)	0.3% (56)	0.1% (10)	0.1% (8)	0% (1)	0% (0)
Multiracial (NH)	3.7% (611)	1.2% (191)	0.9% (122)	—	—
Hispanic/Latino (any race)	11.2% (1,838)	9.7% (1,481)	5.2% (708)	3.1% (259)	4.2% (211)

=== 2020 census ===
As of the 2020 census, Payson had a population of 16,351. The median age was 58.8 years. 14.9% of residents were under the age of 18 and 37.9% of residents were 65 years of age or older. For every 100 females there were 95.5 males, and for every 100 females age 18 and over there were 93.9 males age 18 and over.

95.0% of residents lived in urban areas, while 5.0% lived in rural areas.

There were 7,558 households in Payson, of which 16.8% had children under the age of 18 living in them. Of all households, 47.9% were married-couple households, 18.8% were households with a male householder and no spouse or partner present, and 27.1% were households with a female householder and no spouse or partner present. About 32.5% of all households were made up of individuals and 20.5% had someone living alone who was 65 years of age or older.

There were 9,554 housing units, of which 20.9% were vacant. The homeowner vacancy rate was 2.8% and the rental vacancy rate was 8.5%.

The most reported ancestries in 2020 were:

- English (20.7%)
- German (17.7%)
- Irish (15.1%)
- Mexican (9.2%)
- Italian (4.6%)
- Scottish (3.4%)
- French (2.9%)
- Polish (1.8%)
- Swedish (1.8%)
- Norwegian (1.6%)

=== Demographic estimates ===
According to 2019 estimates, Payson was the 2,788th largest city in the United States. There were 4,070 families residing in the town. The population density was 791 people per square mile, which is 1275% higher than the Arizona average and 773% higher than the national average.

In the town, 30.2% of households were non-families. The average household size was 2.30 and the average family size was 2.71.

In the town, 4.6% of the population was from 18 to 24, 15.3% from 25 to 44, and 25.9% from 45 to 64. English was spoken by 93% of people and Spanish was spoken by 5% of people.

=== Income and poverty ===
The median income for a household in the town was $33,638, and the median income for a family was $38,713. Males had a median income of $30,900 versus $23,750 for females. The per capita income for the town was $19,513. About 6.5% of families and 9.9% of the population were below the poverty line, including 15.1% of those under age 18 and 4.7% of those age 65 or over.

== Recreation ==
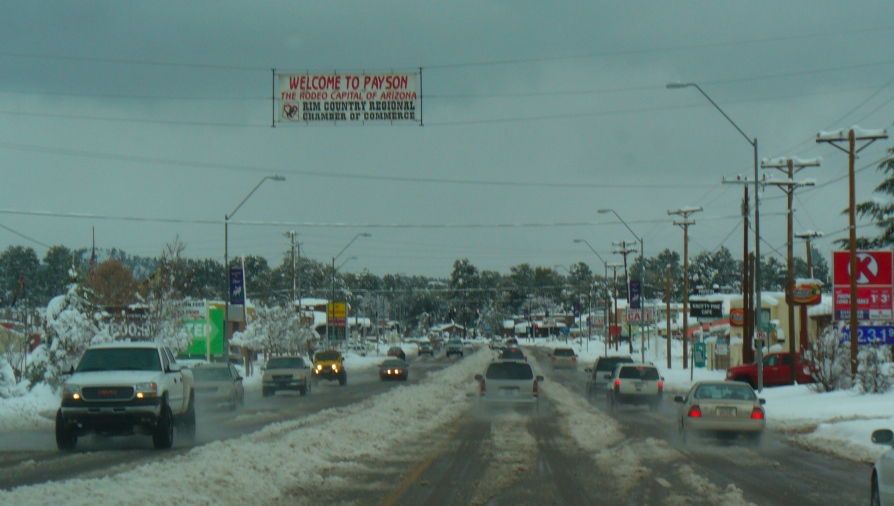
Heading north on Highway 87 into Payson during snowfall

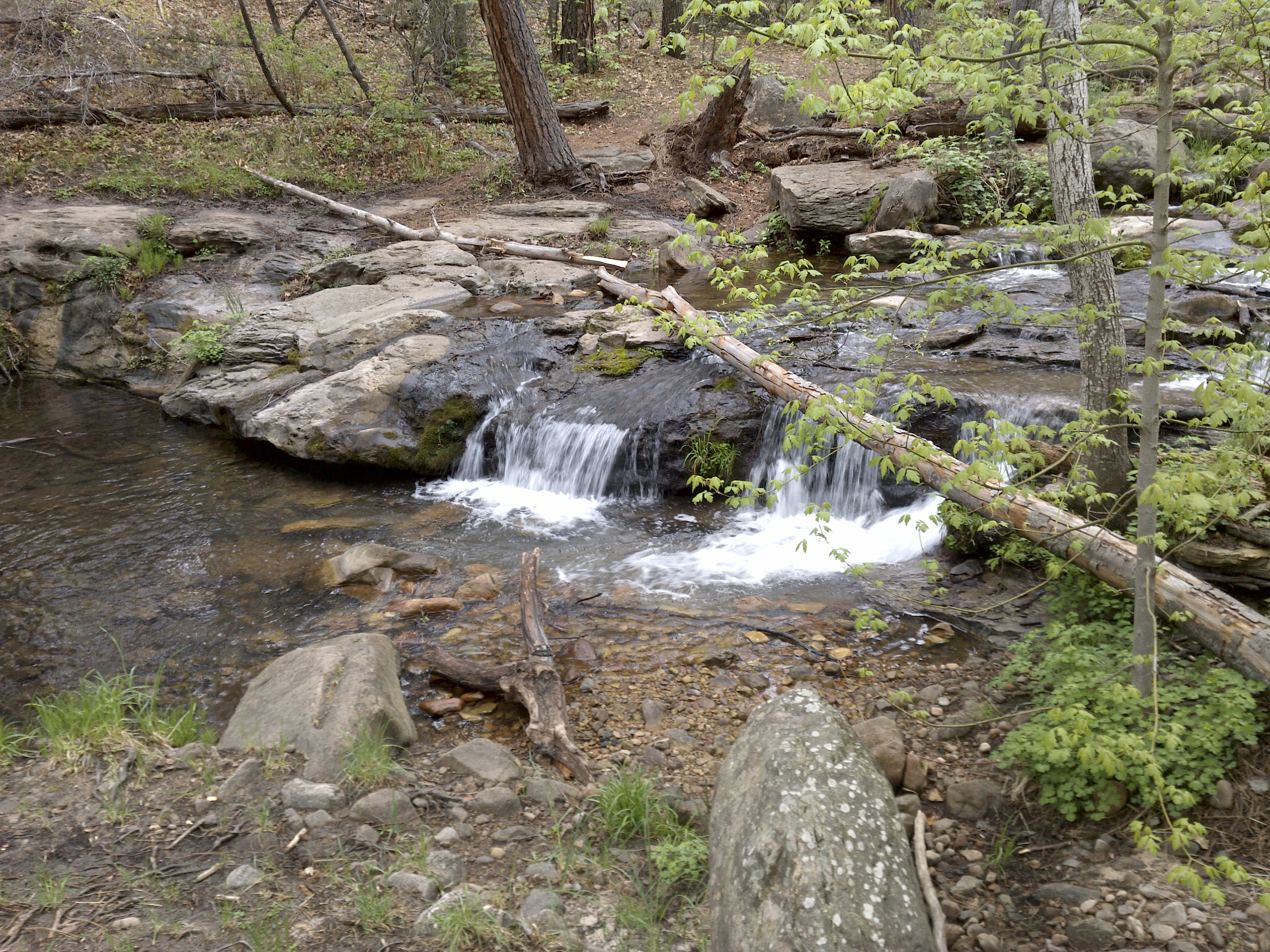
Horton Creek Trail

The United States Forest Service has jurisdiction of 97% of the land around Payson; the town is surrounded by the Tonto National Forest. Much of the land is available for recreational activities. Payson is home to several hiking trails—notably the Cypress/Boulders trail system and nearby Mogollon Rim trails (including Horton Creek trail). The Tonto Natural Bridge, the largest known natural bridge in the world, is located just northwest of Payson in Tonto Natural Bridge State Park, a unit of the Arizona State Park system. The area incorporates three golf courses, two of which belong to private country clubs. Mazatzal Casino, a tribal casino, is operated by the Tonto Apache Reservation near the south end of town.

The Payson area is a popular destination for rock hounds. In various areas surrounding the community, quartz crystals can be found, some rivaling Herkimer diamonds in quality, as well as geodes, agate and onyx. Fossils are commonly found in the Paleozoic strata that is exposed along the Mogollon Rim to the north and west of Payson along State Route 87 and State Route 260.

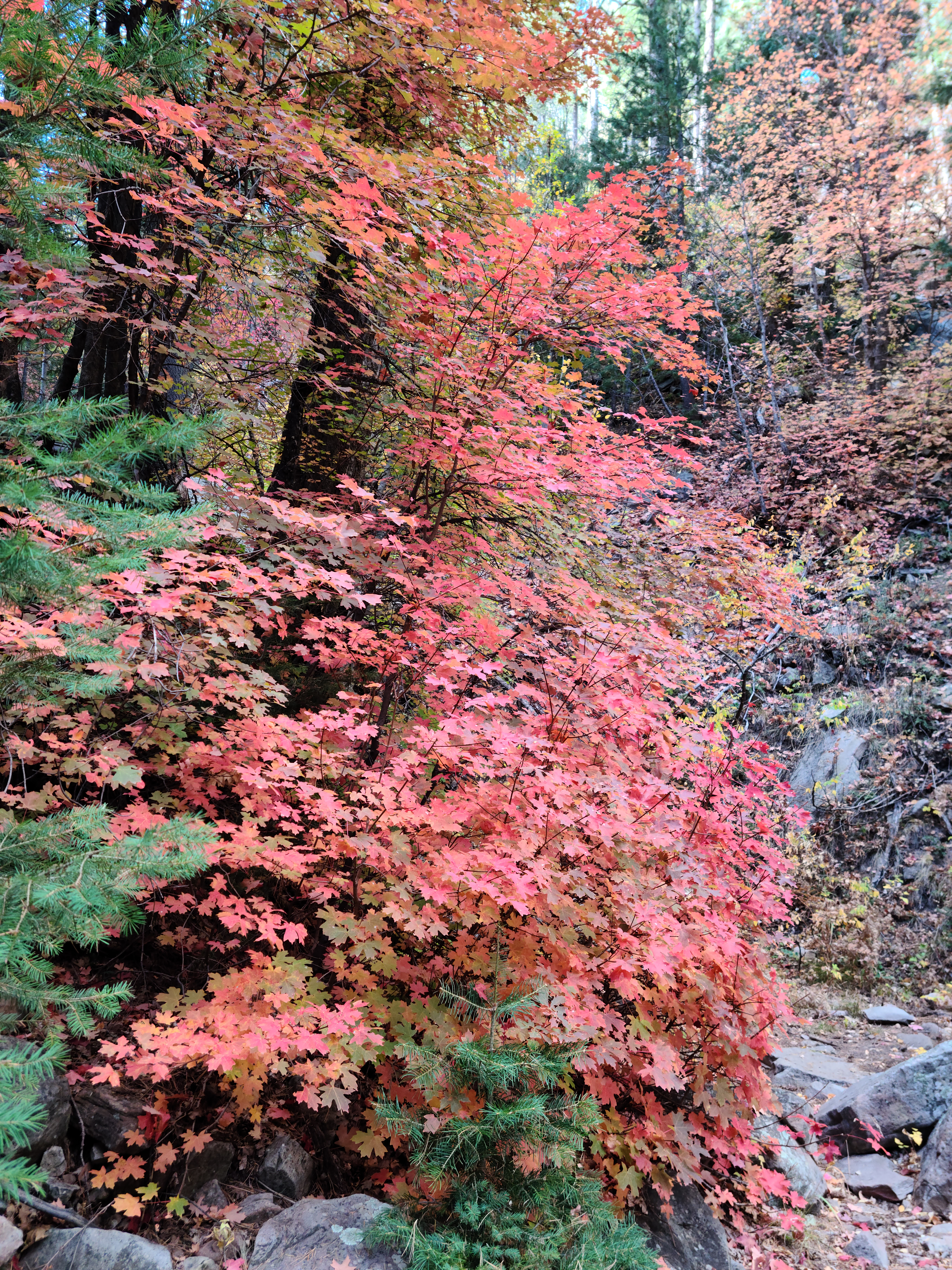
Autumn colors at See Canyon Trail.

Payson has two parks, Green Valley Park and Rumsey Park. It also has two lakes, which are part of the Urban Fish Program. Payson hosts free outdoor concerts in the summer. Other activities include intramural sports like baseball and football. Payson also has a small skate park.

Payson hosts a Fourth of July fireworks display at Green Valley Park.

== Culture ==
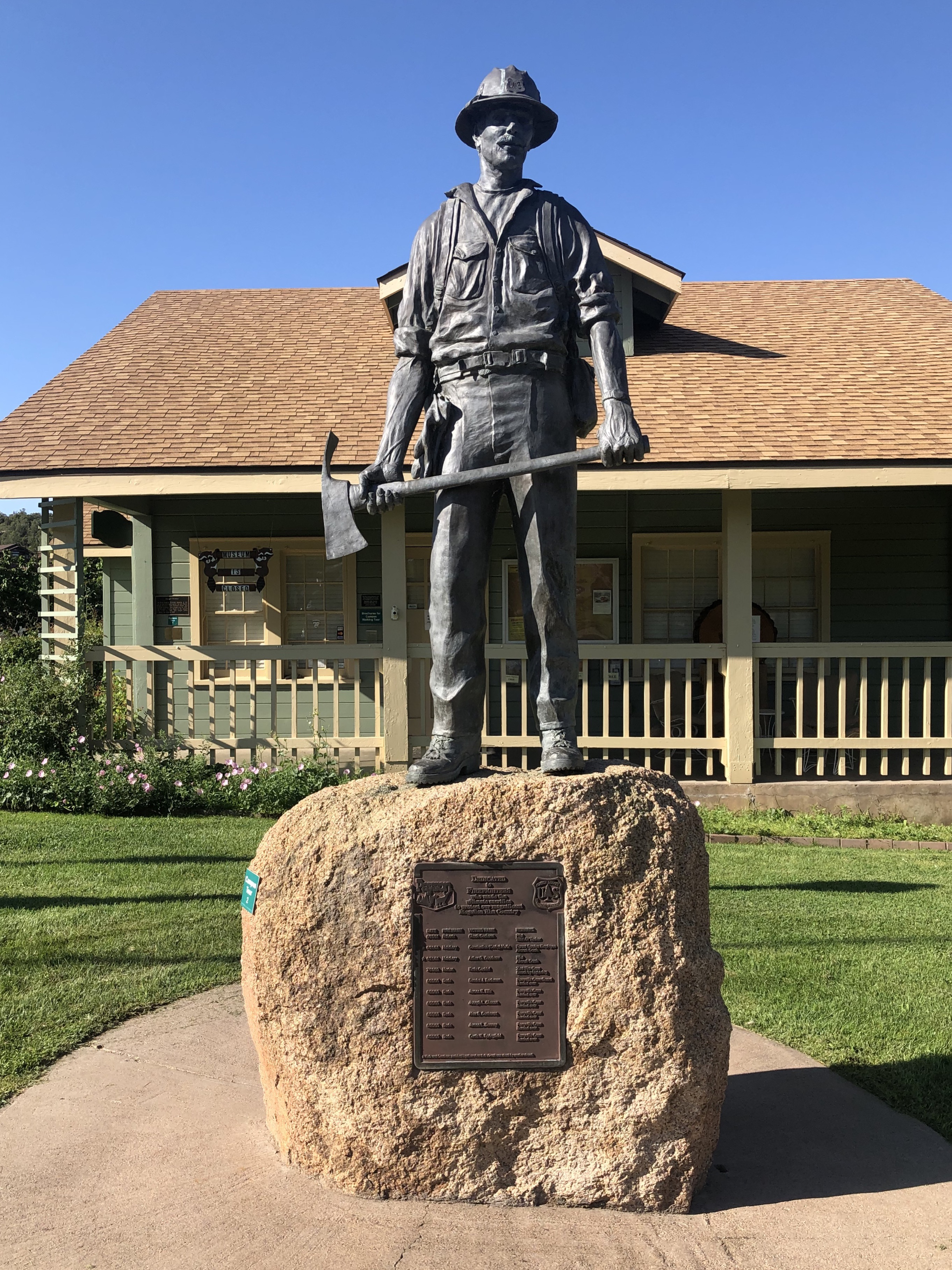
Mogollon Rim Country Firefighter Memorial – Rim Country Museum. The plaque lists the dates, fires and the names of the firefighters who died.

Payson is the site of the annual Arizona State Old Time Fiddlin' Championship, held in September. The fiddle contest features both local and nationally known instrumentalists, and it awards cash prizes. Payson is also home to the annual Northern Gila County Fair.

=== Rodeos ===
Payson hosts two rodeos. In May, the Multi-Purpose Event Center near the Tonto Apache Reservation hosts the Gary Hardt Memorial Rodeo. In August, Payson hosts the historic August Doin's Rodeo (1884), which makes Payson the "Home of the World's Oldest Continuous Rodeo". Prescott, Arizona, 100 miles to the northwest, is known for hosting the "World's Oldest Rodeo" (1888), but it took a hiatus during World War II.

=== Mogollon Monster ===
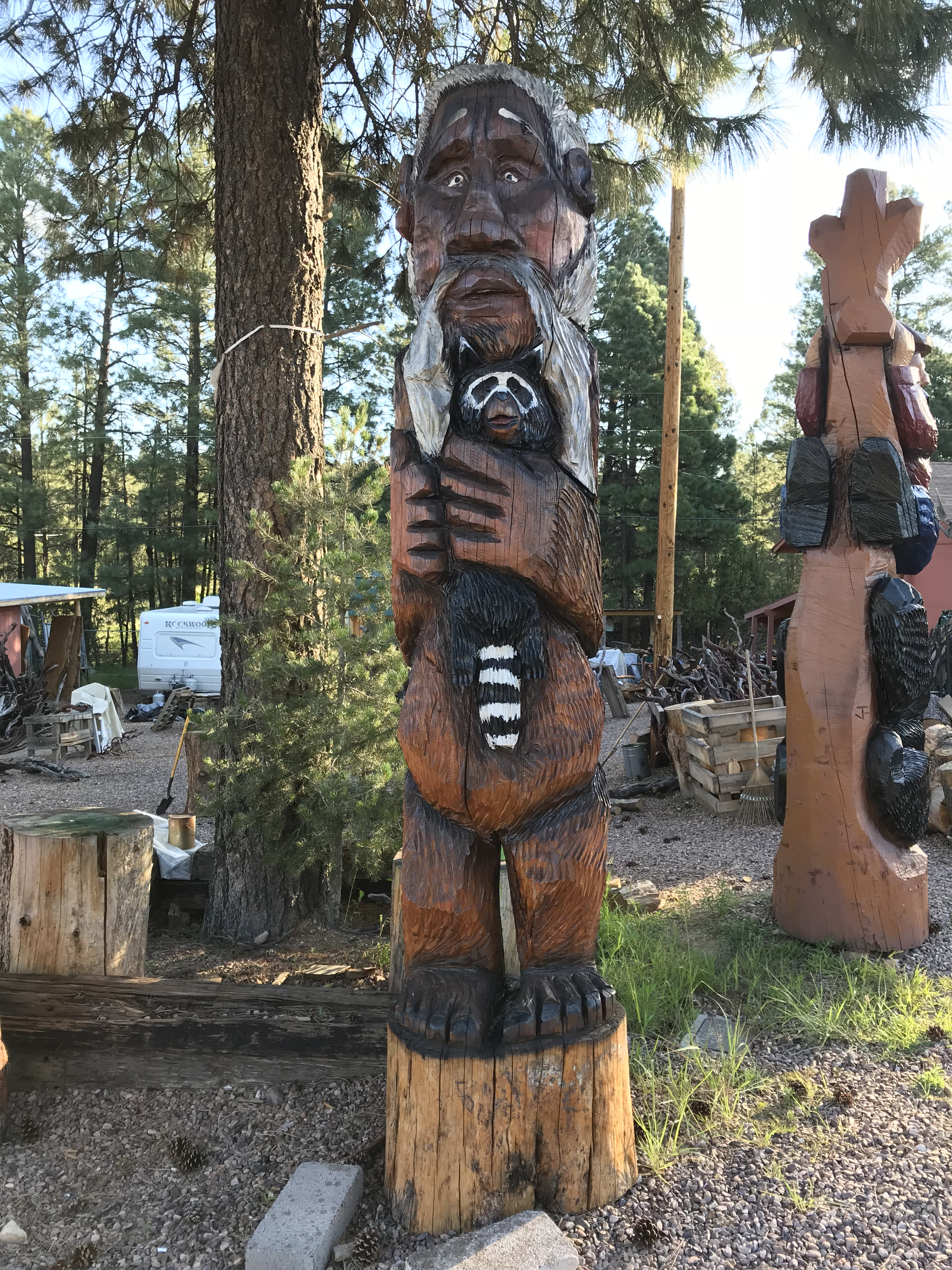
Mogollon Monster Wood Carving

Forestlands surrounding Payson, and throughout central, northern, and eastern Arizona, serve as the backdrop to the legend of the Mogollon Monster—described as a large, bipedal, ape-like creature with a pungent smell, similar to Bigfoot. The legend came to local prominence in 1947 when a "big, hairy beast" raided a Boy Scout camp near Tonto Creek.

== Public services ==
=== Education ===
The town is served by the Payson Unified School District.

A branch of Gila Community College is located in Payson.

=== Police department ===
The Payson Police Department serves both the Town of Payson and Town of Star Valley. As of 2022, the department is authorized to staff 32 sworn officers which includes the chief, lieutenant, five sergeants, four detectives, two school resource officers, two specialty positions (GIITEM and Traffic), and patrol. In 2021, officers responded to more than 16,000 calls for service.

The police department also staffs a 24/7 dispatch center that is the primary public safety answering point (PSAP) for northern Gila County. In addition to dispatching for Payson PD, they also dispatch for the Town of Payson Fire Department, Hellsgate Fire District, Pine/Strawberry Fire District, Christopher Kohls Fire District, Waterwheel Fire District, and Gisela Valley Fire District.

== Transportation ==
The Payson Senior Center operates the Beeline Bus, which provides local bus service to Payson, Star Valley, and Mesa del Caballo.
