= List of census-designated places in Arizona =

The 2020 Census defines 371 census-designated places or CDPs within the state of Arizona. CDPs are defined as populated areas that are not organized into incorporated communities. The names and boundaries of CDPs are defined by the US Census Bureau with the cooperation of state and local officials but have no legal standing. As such, they may be annexed in part or in whole by adjoining cities and towns, become incorporated as part of a new city or town, or be redefined in a subsequent census.

While many CDPs are small, rural communities with insufficient population to support incorporation, this is not always the case. Included in this list are large, urbanized communities such as Sun City, a retirement community of 39,931 residents, or San Tan Valley, a large suburb of the Phoenix Metropolitan Area whose 99,894 inhabitants would make it the largest city or town in Pinal County were it to incorporate.

== Census-designated places ==
Name	County	Population (2020)	Population (2010)	Area (2010)		Population density (2010)		Reservation (if applicable)
Name	County	Population (2020)	Population (2010)	sq mi	km^{2}	/sq mi	/km^{2}	Reservation (if applicable)
Aguila	Maricopa	565	798	1.57	4.1	508.1	196.2	
Ajo	Pima	3,039	3,304	33.33	86.3	99.1	38.3	
Ak Chin	Pima	50	30	0.53	1.4	57.0	22.0	Tohono O'odham
Ak-Chin Village	Pinal	884	862	10.58	27.4	81.5	31.5	Ak-Chin
Alamo Lake	La Paz	4	25	46.56	120.6	0.6	0.2	
Ali Chuk	Pima	119	161	1.44	3.7	111.7	43.1	Tohono O'odham
Ali Chukson	Pima	113	132	2.07	5.4	63.8	24.6	Tohono O'odham
Ali Molina	Pima	61	71	0.77	2.0	92.1	35.6	Tohono O'odham
Alpine	Apache	146	145	0.6	1.6	241.3	93.2	
Amado	Santa Cruz	198	295	5.27	13.6	56.1	21.7	
Anegam	Pima	149	151	2.31	6.0	65.3	25.2	Tohono O'odham
Antares	Mohave	132	126	0.65	1.7	194.8	75.2	
Anthem	Maricopa	23,190	21,700	7.99	20.7	2,717.8	1,049.3	
Arivaca	Pima	623	695	27.78	71.9	25.0	9.7	
Arivaca Junction	Pima	970	1,090	2.92	7.6	372.9	144.0	
Arizona City	Pinal	9,868	10,475	6.18	16.0	1,713.6	661.6	
Arizona Village	Mohave	1,057	946	1.59	4.1	594.9	229.7	Fort Mojave
Arlington	Maricopa	150	194	2.34	6.1	82.8	32.0	
Ash Fork	Yavapai	361	396	2.31	6.0	171.6	66.3	
Avenue B and C	Yuma	4,101	4,176	0.74	1.9	5,681.5	2,193.6	
Avra Valley	Pima	5,569	6,050	22.19	57.5	272.7	105.3	
Aztec	Yuma	2	47	6.16	16.0	7.6	2.9	
Bagdad	Yavapai	1,932	1,876	7.98	20.7	235.0	90.7	
Bear Flat	Gila	11	18	0.21	0.5	85.4	33.0	
Beaver Dam	Mohave	1,552	1,962	8.42	21.8	233.2	90.0	
Beaver Valley	Gila	226	231	1.50	3.9	153.7	59.3	
Bellemont	Coconino	1,167						
Beyerville	Santa Cruz	72	177	0.33	0.9	531.4	205.2	
Bitter Springs	Coconino	355	452	8.02	20.8	56.3	21.7	Navajo
Black Canyon City	Yavapai	2,677	2,837	24.27	62.9	116.9	45.1	
Blackwater	Pinal	1,190	1,062	17.94	46.5	59.2	22.9	Gila River
Blue Ridge	Coconino	594						
Bluewater	La Paz	682	725	2.39	6.2	349.0	134.7	Colorado River
Bouse	La Paz	707	996	136.22	352.8	7.3	2.8	
Bowie	Cochise	406	449	1.70	4.4	264.7	102.2	
Brenda	La Paz	466	676	6.91	17.9	97.8	37.8	
Bryce	Graham	173	175	0.84	2.2	208.0	80.3	
Buckshot	Yuma	70	153	0.32	0.8	505.9	195.3	
Burnside	Apache	494	537	9.28	24.0	57.9	22.4	Navajo
Bylas	Graham	1,782	1,962	4.40	11.4	447.5	172.8	San Carlos Apache
Cactus Flats	Graham	1,524	1,518	6.19	16.0	247.1	95.4	
Cactus Forest	Pinal	606	594	2.73	7.1	217.4	83.9	
Cameron	Coconino	734	885	18.72	48.5	47.3	18.3	Navajo
Campo Bonito	Pinal	83	74	4.02	10.4	18.4	7.1	
Cane Beds	Mohave	466	448	8.29	21.5	54.1	20.9	
Canyon Day	Gila	1,205	1,209	5.08	13.2	240.7	92.9	Fort Apache
Carrizo	Gila	92	127	9.05	23.4	14.1	5.4	Fort Apache
Casa Blanca	Pinal	1,727	1,388	15.79	40.9	87.9	33.9	Gila River
Casas Adobes	Pima	70,973	66,795	26.87	69.6	2,496.9	964.1	
Catalina	Pima	7,551	7,569	14.11	36.5	536.4	207.1	
Catalina Foothills	Pima	52,401	50,796	42.11	109.1	1,209.2	466.9	
Cedar Creek	Gila	372	318	17.04	44.1	18.7	7.2	Fort Apache
Centennial Park	Mohave	1,578	1,264	2.17	5.6	582.8	225.0	
Central	Graham	758	645	1.89	4.9	341.8	132.0	
Central Heights-Midland City	Gila	2,319	2,534	1.94	5.0	1,303.1	503.1	
Charco	Pima	27	52	0.93	2.4	55.9	21.6	Tohono O'odham
Chiawuli Tak	Pima	48	78	2.43	6.3	32.0	12.4	Tohono O'odham
Chilchinbito	Navajo	769	506	23.77	61.6	21.3	8.2	Navajo
Chinle	Apache	4,573	4,518	16.05	41.6	281.9	108.8	Navajo
Chloride	Mohave	229	271	1.51	3.9	179.8	69.4	
Christopher Creek	Gila	121	156	3.03	7.8	51.4	19.8	
Chuichu	Pinal	240	269	6.87	17.8	39.2	15.1	Tohono O'odham
Cibecue	Navajo	1,816	1,713	5.97	15.5	286.9	110.8	Fort Apache
Cibola	La Paz	198	250	20.19	52.3	12.8	4.9	
Cienega Springs	La Paz	1,690	1,798	20.19	52.3	12.8	4.9	
Circle City	Maricopa	522						
Citrus Park	Maricopa	5,194	4,028	5.80	15.0	695.1	268.4	
Clacks Canyon	Mohave	167	173	3.32	8.6	52.1	20.1	
Claypool	Gila	1,395	1,538	1.18	3.1	1,308.9	505.4	
Clay Springs	Navajo	331	401	2.85	7.4	140.9	54.4	
Comobabi	Pima	44	8	1.15	3.0	7	2.7	Tohono O'odham
Concho	Apache	54	38	0.45	1.2	85.3	32.9	
Congress	Yavapai	1,811	1,975	37.69	97.6	52.4	20.2	
Copper Hill	Gila	158	108	7.35	19.0	14.7	5.7	
Cordes Lakes	Yavapai	2,684	2,633	10.81	28.0	243.6	94.1	
Cornfields	Apache	221	255	0.39	1.0	659.3	254.6	Navajo
Cornville	Yavapai	3,362	3,280	13.20	34.2	248.4	95.9	
Corona de Tucson	Pima	9,240	5,675	6.09	15.8	932.2	359.9	
Cottonwood	Apache	167	226	0.14	0.4	1,578.4	609.4	Navajo
Cowlic	Pima	105	135	0.80	2.1	168.8	65.2	Tohono O'odham
Crozier	Mohave	21	14	1.05	2.7	13.3	5.1	
Crystal Beach	Mohave	250	279	0.34	0.9	824.6	318.4	
Cutter	Gila	84	74	0.83	2.1	89.6	34.6	San Carlos Apache
Dateland	Yuma	257	416	22.09	57.2	18.8	7.3	
Deer Creek	Gila	230	216	1.74	4.5	123.9	47.8	
Del Muerto	Apache	258	329	0.99	2.6	332.2	128.3	Navajo
Dennehotso	Apache	587	746	9.96	25.8	75.0	29.0	Navajo
Desert Hills	Mohave	2,764	2,245	4.90	12.7	521.0	201.2	
Dilkon	Navajo	1,194	1,184	16.60	43.0	71.3	27.5	Navajo
Dolan Springs	Mohave	1,989	2,033	58.12	150.5	35.0	13.5	
Doney Park	Coconino	5,910	5,395	14.96	38.7	360.7	139.3	
Donovan Estates	Yuma	1,295	1,508	0.12	0.3	12,430.8	4,799.6	
Dragoon	Cochise	178	209	1.75	4.5	119.4	46.1	
Drexel Heights	Pima	27,523	27,749	20.20	52.3	1,373.9	530.5	Pascua Yaqui (Note: Only part of this area is located within a reservation.)
Dripping Springs	Gila	142	235	6.70	17.4	35.1	13.6	
Drysdale	Yuma	225	272	0.16	0.4	1,662.6	641.9	
Dudleyville	Pinal	597	959	6.71	17.4	143.0	55.2	
East Fork	Navajo	672	699	1.94	5.0	360.4	139.2	Fort Apache
East Globe	Gila	259	226	3.45	8.9	65.6	25.3	San Carlos Apache
East Verde Estates	Gila	151	170	2.50	6.5	67.9	26.2	
Ehrenberg	La Paz	763	1,470	12.13	31.4	123.3	47.6	
El Capitan	Gila	48	37	6.08	15.7	6.1	2.4	
Elephant Head	Pima	588	612	7.43	19.2	82.4	31.8	
Elfrida	Cochise	421	459	3.83	9.9	119.7	46.2	
Elgin	Santa Cruz	162	161	5.95	15.4	27.1	10.5	
El Prado Estates	Yuma	320	504	0.97	2.5	520.3	200.9	
First Mesa	Navajo	1,352	1,555	15.75	40.8	98.8	38.1	Hopi
Flowing Springs	Gila	34	42	1.71	4.4	24.6	9.5	
Flowing Wells	Pima	15,657	16,419	4.02	10.4	4,084.5	1,577.0	
Fort Apache	Navajo	113	143	1.15	3.0	124.3	48.0	Fort Apache
Fort Defiance	Apache	3,541	3,624	6.10	15.8	594.2	229.4	Navajo
Fort Mohave	Mohave	16,190	14,364	16.70	43.3	860.4	332.2	Fort Mojave
Fort Thomas	Graham	319	374	8.67	22.5	43.1	16.6	
Fort Valley	Coconino	1,682	779	7.64	19.8	101.9	39.3	
Forest Lakes	Coconino	155						
Fortuna Foothills	Yuma	27,776	26,265	40.17	104.0	653.8	252.4	
Franklin	Greenlee	75	92	1.00	2.6	91.8	35.4	
Freedom Acres	Gila	90	84	1.75	4.5	47.9	18.5	
Gadsden	Yuma	571	678	1.96	5.1	345.6	133.4	
Ganado	Apache	883	1,210	9.15	23.7	132.3	51.1	Navajo
Geronimo Estates	Gila	30	60	1.32	3.4	45.4	17.5	
Gila Crossing	Maricopa	636	621	0.87	2.3	714.5	275.9	Gila River
Gisela	Gila	536	570	2.88	7.5	199.2	76.9	
Gold Canyon	Pinal	11,404	10,159	22.39	58.0	453.7	175.2	
Golden Shores	Mohave	1,927	2,047	8.14	21.1	251.6	97.1	
Golden Valley	Mohave	8,801	8,370	78.74	203.9	106.3	41.0	
Goodyear Village	Pinal	463	457	3.36	8.7	136.1	52.5	Gila River
Grand Canyon Village	Coconino	1,784	2,004	13.40	34.7	149.5	57.7	
Grand Canyon West	Mohave	0	2	17.60	45.6	0.1	0.0	Hualapai
Greasewood	Navajo	372	547	5.35	13.9	102.4	39.5	Navajo
Green Valley	Pima	22,616	21,391	32.26	83.6	663.4	256.1	
Greenehaven	Coconino	381						
Greer	Apache	58	41	0.53	1.4	77.7	30.0	
Gu Oidak	Pima	126	188	7.09	18.4	26.5	10.2	Tohono O'odham
Hackberry	Mohave	103	68	17.59	45.6	3.9	1.5	
Haigler Creek	Gila	39	19	1.61	4.2	11.8	4.6	
Haivana Nakya	Pima	72	96	1.86	4.8	51.6	19.9	Tohono O'odham
Hard Rock	Navajo	38	94	5.92	15.3	15.9	6.1	Hopi/Navajo
Heber-Overgaard	Navajo	2,898	2,822	6.86	17.8	411.2	158.8	
Hondah	Navajo	814	812	12.28	31.8	66.3	25.6	Fort Apache
Hotevilla-Bacavi	Navajo	1,001	957	11.76	30.5	81.4	31.4	Hopi
Houck	Apache	886	1,024	42.28	109.5	24.1	9.3	Navajo
Hunter Creek	Gila	51	48	2.20	5.7	21.8	8.4	
Icehouse Canyon	Gila	574	677	4.90	12.7	138.1	53.3	
Indian Wells	Navajo	232	255	10.40	26.9	24.5	9.5	Navajo
J-Six Ranchettes	Pima	547						
Jakes Corner	Gila	98	76	1.42	3.7	53.5	20.7	
Jeddito	Navajo	346	293	5.42	14.0	54.1	20.9	Navajo
Joseph City	Navajo	1,307	1,386	7.41	19.2	187.3	72.3	
Kachina Village	Coconino	2,502	2,622	1.22	3.2	2,144.4	828.0	
Kaibab	Mohave	140	124	6.46	16.7	19.2	7.4	Kaibab Paiute
Kaibab Estates West	Coconino	1,034						
Kaibito	Coconino	1,540	1,522	15.90	41.2	95.7	36.9	Navajo
Kaka	Maricopa	83	141	0.26	0.7	545.0	210.4	Tohono O'odham
Katherine	Mohave	76	103	4.62	12.0	27.2	10.5	
Kayenta	Navajo	4,670	5,189	13.24	34.3	393.9	152.1	Navajo
Keams Canyon	Navajo	265	304	16.65	43.1	18.3	7.1	Hopi
Kino Springs	Santa Cruz	166	136	0.26	0.7	526.3	203.2	
Klagetoh	Apache	181	242	0.34	0.9	722.8	279.1	Navajo
Kleindale	Pima	165						
Kohatk	Pinal	37	27	0.10	0.3	275.3	106.3	Tohono O'odham
Kohls Ranch	Gila	30	46	1.17	3.0	39.3	15.2	
Komatke	Maricopa	1,013	821	2.24	5.8	366.5	141.5	Gila River
Ko Vaya	Pima	43	46	1.10	2.8	41.8	16.1	Tohono O'odham
Kykotsmovi Village	Navajo	736	746	16.93	43.8	44.1	17.0	Hopi
Lake Montezuma	Yavapai	5,111	4,706	12.04	31.2	391.1	151.0	
Lake of the Woods	Navajo	3,648	4,094	4.14	10.7	1,032.4	398.6	
La Paz Valley	La Paz	368	699	29.33	76.0	23.8	9.2	
Lazy Y U	Mohave	474	248	15.71	40.7	27.2	10.5	
LeChee	Coconino	1,236	1,443	16.60	43.0	86.9	33.6	Navajo
Leupp	Coconino	934	951	13.56	35.1	70.2	27.1	Navajo
Linden	Navajo	2,760	2,597	30.48	78.9	85.2	32.9	
Littlefield	Mohave	256	308	11.96	31.0	25.7	9.9	
Littletown	Pima	x	873	0.12	0.3	7,006.7	2,705.3	
Low Mountain	Navajo	631	757	36.90	95.6	20.5	7.9	Hopi/Navajo
Lower Santan Village	Pinal	437	374	4.15	10.7	90.0	34.7	Gila River
Lukachukai	Apache	1,424	1,701	22.02	57.0	77.4	29.9	Navajo
Lupton	Apache	19	25	0.35	0.9	71.8	27.7	Navajo
McConnico	Mohave	63	70	6.56	17.0	10.7	4.1	
McNary	Apache/Navajo	484	528	5.57	14.4	96.1	37.1	Fort Apache
McNeal	Cochise	182	238	3.75	9.7	63.5	24.5	
Maish Vaya	Pima	129	158	4.24	11.0	37.3	14.4	Tohono O'odham
Many Farms	Apache	1,243	1,348	8.18	21.2	165.3	63.8	Navajo
Maricopa Colony	Maricopa	854	709	5.57	14.4	127.3	49.2	Gila River
Martinez Lake	Yuma	94	798	9.14	23.7	97.6	37.7	
Mayer	Yavapai	1,558	1,497	20.08	52.0	74.6	28.8	
Mead Ranch	Gila	42	38	0.60	1.6	63.6	24.6	
Meadview	Mohave	1,420	1,224	31.04	80.4	39.4	15.2	
Mesa del Caballo	Gila	781	765	0.32	0.8	2,428.5	937.6	
Mescal	Cochise	1,751	1,812	4.87	12.6	372.8	143.9	
Mesquite Creek	Mohave	403	416	1.01	2.6	410.2	158.4	Fort Mojave
Miracle Valley	Cochise	571	644	0.55	1.4	1,177.0	454.4	
Moccasin	Mohave	53	89	0.77	2.0	116.2	44.9	Kaibab Paiute
Moenkopi	Coconino	771	964	1.50	3.9	188.9	72.9	Hopi
Mohave Valley	Mohave	2,693	2,616	14.04	36.4	186.5	72.0	Fort Mojave
Mojave Ranch Estates	Mohave	53	52	0.75	1.9	69.5	26.8	Fort Mojave
Morenci	Greenlee	2,028	1,489	0.98	2.5	1,549.2	598.1	
Mormon Lake	Coconino	90						
Morristown	Maricopa	186	227	0.81	2.1	281.5	108.7	
Mountain View Ranches	Coconino	1,508						
Mountainaire	Coconino	1,068	1,119	10.20	26.4	109.8	42.4	
Munds Park	Coconino	1,096	631	22.29	57.7	28.4	11.0	
Naco	Cochise	824	1,046	3.30	8.5	316.8	122.3	
Nazlini	Apache	505	489	7.46	19.3	65.6	25.3	Navajo
Nelson	Pima	249	259	0.44	1.1	588.3	227.1	
New Kingman-Butler	Mohave	12,907	12,134	4.97	12.9	2,441.8	942.8	
New River	Maricopa	17,290	14,952	55.76	144.4	268.2	103.6	
Nolic	Pima	12	37	0.52	1.3	70.8	27.3	Tohono O'odham
North Fork	Navajo	1,467	1,417	61.62	159.6	23.0	8.9	Fort Apache
Nutrioso	Apache	39	26	0.31	0.8	84.6	32.7	
Oak Creek Canyon	Coconino	442						
Oak Springs	Apache	54	63	0.19	0.5	338.9	130.9	Navajo
Oatman	Mohave	102	135	0.19	0.5	703.0	271.4	
Oljato-Monument Valley	Navajo	115	154	12.42	32.2	12.4	4.8	Navajo
Oracle	Pinal	3,051	3,686	16.41	42.5	224.7	86.8	
Orange Grove Mobile Manor	Yuma	495	594	0.06	0.2	9,478.5	3,659.7	
Oxbow Estates	Gila	198	217	0.49	1.3	442.0	170.7	
Padre Ranchitos	Yuma	133	171	0.29	0.8	589.4	227.6	
Palominas	Cochise	222	212	1.93	5.0	110.0	42.5	
Parker Strip	La Paz	621	662	4.16	10.8	212.0	81.9	
Parks	Coconino	1,382	1,188	172.36	446.4	6.9	2.7	
Paulden	Yavapai	5,567	5,231	57.06	147.8	91.7	35.4	
Peach Springs	Mohave	1,098	1,090	7.91	20.5	137.7	53.2	Hualapai
Peeples Valley	Yavapai	499	428	15.14	39.2	28.3	10.9	
Peridot	Gila/Graham	1,308	1,350	5.16	13.4	261.8	101.1	San Carlos Apache
Picacho	Pinal	250	471	6.35	16.4	74.1	28.6	
Picture Rocks	Pima	9,551	9,563	70.88	183.6	134.9	52.1	
Pimaco Two	Pima	x	682	4.54	11.8	150.2	58.0	
Pinal	Gila	456	439	0.44	1.1	1,001.5	386.7	
Pine	Gila	1,953	1,963	32.42	84.0	60.6	23.4	
Pine Lake	Mohave	142	138	1.69	4.4	81.8	31.6	
Pinedale	Navajo	482	487	9.68	25.1	50.3	19.4	
Pinetop Country Club	Navajo	1,409	1,794	6.75	17.5	265.7	102.6	
Pinion	Navajo	1,084	904	6.49	16.8	139.5	53.9	Navajo
Pinion Pines	Mohave	156	186	1.50	3.9	123.8	47.8	
Pirtleville	Cochise	1,412	1,744	1.87	4.8	930.8	359.4	
Pisinemo	Pima	359	321	2.27	5.9	141.5	54.6	Tohono O'odham
Poston	La Paz	183	285	1.36	3.5	209.1	80.7	Colorado River
Queen Valley	Pinal	967	788	9.74	25.2	80.9	31.2	
Rainbow City	Navajo	1,001	968	2.18	5.6	444.5	171.6	Fort Apache
Rancho Mesa Verde	Yuma	571	625	0.11	0.3	5,565.3	2,148.8	
Red Lake	Coconino	1,680						
Red Mesa	Apache	354	480	12.85	33.3	37.4	14.4	Navajo
Red Rock	Apache	136	169	1.17	3.0	145.0	56.0	Navajo
Red Rock	Pinal	2,625	2,169	47.31	122.5	45.9	17.7	
Rillito	Pima	94	97	0.07	0.2	1,372.4	529.9	
Rincon Valley	Pima	5,612	5,139	27.83	72.1	184.6	71.3	
Rio Rico	Santa Cruz	20,549	18,962	62.44	161.7	304.6	117.6	
Rio Verde	Maricopa	2,210	1,811	5.05	13.1	359.1	138.6	
Rock House	Gila	10	50	0.64	1.7	82.2	31.7	
Rock Point	Apache	552	642	14.18	36.7	45.3	17.5	Navajo
Roosevelt	Gila	26	28	3.09	8.0	9.1	3.5	
Roosevelt Estates	Gila	449						
Rough Rock	Apache	428	414	12.79	33.1	32.4	12.5	Navajo
Round Rock	Apache	640	789	14.35	37.2	55.4	21.4	Navajo
Round Valley	Gila	459	487	4.79	12.4	101.8	39.3	
Rye	Gila	104	77	0.51	1.3	151.3	58.4	
Sacate Village	Pinal	260	169	3.48	9.0	48.5	18.7	Gila River
Sacaton	Pinal	3,254	2,672	8.12	21.0	329.0	127.0	Gila River
Sacaton Flats Village	Pinal	576	541	6.24	16.2	86.8	33.5	Gila River
Saddlebrooke	Pinal	12,574	9,614	29.29	75.9	328.2	126.7	
St. David	Cochise	1,639	1,699	5.34	13.8	319.0	123.2	
St. Johns	Maricopa	690	476	2.28	5.9	208.7	80.6	Gila River
St. Michaels	Apache	1,384	1,443	3.82	9.9	377.9	145.9	Navajo
Salome	La Paz	1,162	1,530	33.33	86.3	45.9	17.7	
San Carlos	Gila	3,987	4,038	8.58	22.2	470.8	181.8	San Carlos Apache
San Jose	Graham	467	506	4.21	10.9	120.6	46.6	
San Manuel	Pinal	3,114	3,551	20.75	53.7	171.4	66.2	
San Miguel	Pima	205	197	5.65	14.6	34.9	13.5	
San Simon	Cochise	158	165	0.70	1.8	235.8	91.0	
San Tan Valley	Pinal	99,894	81,321	35.78	92.7	2,272.7	877.5	
Sanders	Apache	575	630	2.39	6.2	263.1	101.6	Navajo
Santa Cruz	Pinal	39	37	1.63	4.2	22.7	8.8	Gila River
Santa Rosa	Pima	474	628	6.55	17.0	95.9	37.0	Tohono O'odham
Sawmill	Apache	564	748	5.77	14.9	129.7	50.1	Navajo
Scenic	Mohave	1,321	1,643	16.50	42.7	100.1	38.6	
Seba Dalkai	Navajo	126	136	15.13	39.2	9.0	3.5	Navajo
Second Mesa	Navajo	843	962	40.14	104.0	24.0	9.3	Hopi
Sehili	Apache	153	135	0.65	1.7	207.1	80.0	Navajo
Seligman	Yavapai	446	445	6.41	16.6	69.4	26.8	
Sells	Pima	2,121	2,495	9.50	24.6	262.8	101.5	Tohono O'odham
Seven Mile	Navajo	742	707	2.27	5.9	312.4	120.6	Fort Apache
Shongopovi	Navajo	711	831	1.59	4.1	523.7	202.2	Hopi
Shonto	Navajo	494	591	4.56	11.8	129.7	50.1	Navajo
Shumway	Navajo	347						
Sierra Vista Southeast	Cochise	14,428	14,797	110.92	287.3	133.4	51.5	
Six Shooter Canyon	Gila	958	1,019	2.92	7.6	349.4	134.9	
So-Hi	Mohave	428	477	0.88	2.3	544.7	210.3	
Solomon	Graham	399	426	0.21	0.5	2,045.6	789.8	
Sonoita	Santa Cruz	803	818	10.56	27.4	77.5	29.9	
South Komelik	Pima	176	111	3.90	10.1	28.5	11.0	Tohono O'odham
Spring Valley	Yavapai	1,143	1,148	10.58	27.4	108.5	41.9	
Stanfield	Pinal	558	740	3.95	10.2	187.9	72.5	
Steamboat	Apache	235	284	2.40	6.2	118.6	45.8	Navajo
Stotonic Village	Pinal	610	659	4.95	12.8	133.0	51.4	Gila River
Strawberry	Gila	943	961	9.47	24.5	101.6	39.2	
Summerhaven	Pima	71	40	4.54	11.8	8.8	3.4	
Summit	Pima	4,724	5,372	4.49	11.6	1,196.6	462.0	
Sun City	Maricopa	39,931	37,499	14.54	37.7	2,610.5	1,007.9	
Sun City West	Maricopa	25,806	24,535	10.94	28.3	2,245.1	866.8	
Sun Lakes	Maricopa	14,868	13,975	5.34	13.8	2,628.8	1,015.0	
Sun Valley	Navajo	153	316	31.61	81.9	10.0	3.9	
Sunizona	Cochise	233	281	8.48	22.0	33.1	12.8	
Sunsites	Cochise	790						
Sunwest	La Paz	5	15	24.25	62.8	0.6	0.2	
Supai	Coconino	0	208	1.73	4.5	120.2	46.4	Havasupai
Sweet Water Village	Pinal	123	83	0.80	2.1	103.8	40.1	Gila River
Swift Trail Junction	Graham	2,810	2,935	3.70	9.6	800.2	309.0	
Tacna	Yuma	425	602	1.92	5.0	313.3	121.0	
Tanque Verde	Pima	16,250	16,901	32.98	85.4	512.5	197.9	
Tat Momoli	Pinal	18	10	0.93	2.4	10.8	4.2	Tohono O'odham
Teec Nos Pos	Apache	507	730	14.30	37.0	51.1	19.7	Navajo
Tees Toh	Navajo	420	448	17.00	44.0	26.3	10.2	Navajo
Theba	Maricopa	111	158	0.62	1.6	254.2	98.1	
Three Points	Pima	5,184	5,581	46.42	120.2	120.2	46.4	
Timberline-Fernwood	Coconino	2,572						
Tolani Lake	Coconino	227	280	0.43	1.1	655.1	252.9	Navajo
Tonalea	Coconino	451	549	9.93	25.7	55.3	21.4	Navajo
Tonopah	Maricopa	23	60	1.37	3.5	43.9	16.9	
Tonto Basin	Gila	1,444	1,424	31.32	81.1	45.5	17.6	
Tonto Village	Gila	209	256	0.33	0.9	765.7	295.6	
Topawa	Pima	233	299	5.16	13.4	58.0	22.4	Tohono O'odham
Topock	Mohave	2	10	0.26	0.7	38.5	14.9	
Top-of-the-World	Gila/Pinal	274	231	6.06	15.7	38.1	14.7	
Toyei	Apache	2	13	0.33	0.9	40.0	15.4	Navajo
Truxton	Mohave	104	134	3.82	9.9	35.5	13.7	
Tsaile	Apache	1,408	1,205	6.00	15.5	202.5	78.2	Navajo
Tubac	Santa Cruz	1,581	1,191	10.80	28.0	110.3	42.6	
Tuba City	Coconino	8,072	8,611	8.97	23.2	959.5	370.5	Navajo
Tucson Estates	Pima	12,069	12,192	13.00	33.7	938.1	362.2	
Tucson Mountains	Pima	10,862						
Tumacacori-Carmen	Santa Cruz	329	393	1.97	5.1	200.1	77.3	
Turkey Creek	Navajo	377	294	0.82	2.1	357.8	138.1	Fort Apache
Upper Santan Village	Pinal	665	495	7.06	18.3	70.1	27.1	Gila River
Utting	La Paz	92	126	26.47	68.6	4.8	1.9	
Vail	Pima	13,604	10,208	22.66	58.7	450.5	173.9	
Vaiva Vo	Pinal	93	128	0.46	1.2	277.8	107.3	Tohono O'odham
Valencia West	Pima	14,101	9,355	10.44	27.0	896.3	346.1	
Valentine	Mohave	39	38	1.59	4.1	23.8	9.2	Hualapai
Valle	Coconino	759	832	243.89	631.7	0.4	0.2	
Valle Vista	Mohave	1,802	1,659	11.99	31.1	138.4	53.4	
Ventana	Pima	52	49	1.04	2.7	47.3	18.3	Tohono O'odham
Verde Village	Yavapai	12,019	11,605	6.98	18.1	1,662.5	641.9	
Vernon	Apache	126	122	0.57	1.5	215.6	83.2	
Vicksburg	La Paz	418	597	142.93	370.2	4.2	1.6	
Village of Oak Creek	Yavapai	6,128	6,147	5.26	13.6	1,169.4	451.5	
Wagon Wheel	Navajo	1,856	1,652	3.08	8.0	570.5	220.3	
Wahak Hotrontk	Pima	88	114	1.54	4.0	74.0	28.6	Tohono O'odham
Wall Lane	Yuma	262	415	0.44	1.1	952.2	367.6	
Walnut Creek	Mohave	571	562	1.53	4.0	366.2	141.4	
Washington Park	Gila	85	70	2.62	6.8	26.7	10.3	
Wellton Hills	Yuma	167	258	0.64	1.7	403.5	155.8	
Wenden	La Paz	458	728	14.95	38.7	48.7	18.8	
Wet Camp Village	Pinal	300	229	4.40	11.4	52.0	20.1	Gila River
Wheatfields	Gila	556	785	8.06	20.9	97.4	37.6	
Whetstone	Cochise	3,236	2,617	11.91	30.8	219.8	84.9	
Whispering Pines	Gila	124	148	0.43	1.1	344.8	133.1	
White Hills	Mohave	345	323	51.92	134.5	6.2	2.4	
White Mountain Lake	Navajo	2,335	2,205	24.25	62.8	92.1	35.6	
Whitecone	Navajo	768	817	45.11	116.8	18.1	7.0	Navajo
Whiteriver	Navajo	4,520	4,104	15.78	40.9	261.9	101.1	Fort Apache
Why	Pima	122	167	8.96	23.2	18.6	7.2	Tohono O'odham
Wide Ruins	Apache	20	176	0.39	1.0	449.8	173.7	Navajo
Wikieup	Mohave	135	133	4.44	11.5	30.0	11.6	
Wilhoit	Yavapai	864	868	15.69	40.6	55.3	21.4	
Williamson	Yavapai	6,196	5,438	56.92	147.4	95.5	36.9	
Willow Canyon	Pima	2	1	0.33	0.9	3.0	1.2	
Willow Valley	Mohave	1,059	1,062	4.97	12.9	215.2	83.1	Fort Mojave
Window Rock	Apache	2,500	2,712	5.28	13.7	513.9	198.4	Navajo
Winslow West	Coconino/Navajo	457	438	17.86	46.3	24.5	9.5	Hopi
Wintersburg	Maricopa	51	136	0.50	1.3	274.5	106.0	
Wittmann	Maricopa	684	763	0.95	2.5	803.8	310.3	
Woodruff	Navajo	154	191	5.78	15.0	33.1	12.8	
Yarnell	Yavapai	570	649	8.82	22.8	73.5	28.4	
York	Greenlee	599	557	1.87	4.8	298.3	115.2	
Young	Gila	588	666	47.82	123.9	13.9	5.4	
Yucca	Mohave	96	126	2.24	5.8	56.3	21.7	
Yuma Proving Ground	Yuma	313						

== See also ==
- List of municipalities in Arizona
