= List of places in Arizona (W–Z) =

This is a list of cities, towns, unincorporated communities, counties, and other places in the U.S. state of Arizona, which start with the letters U or V. This list is derived from the Geographic Names Information System, which has numerous errors, so it also includes many ghost towns and historical places that are not necessarily communities or actual populated places. This list also includes information on the number and names of counties in which the place lies, its lower and upper ZIP code bounds, if applicable, its U.S. Geological Survey (USGS) reference number(s) (called the GNIS), class as designated by the USGS, and incorporated community located in (if applicable).

== W ==
Name of place	Number of counties	Principal county	GNIS #(s)	Class	Located in	ZIP code	
Name of place	Number of counties	Principal county	GNIS #(s)	Class	Located in	Lower	Upper
Waddell	1	Maricopa County	24677	Populated Place	Surprise	85355	
Wagoner	1	Yavapai County	35806	Populated Place		86332	
Wagon Wheel	1	Navajo County	2582893	CDP			
Wahak Hotrontk	1	Pima County	2582894	CDP		85634	
Wahweap	1	Coconino County	25256	Populated Place		86040	
Walapai	1	Mohave County	24678	Populated Place			
Walker	1	Yavapai County	35817	Populated Place		86301	
Wall Lane	1	Yuma County	2582895	CDP		85634	
Walnut Creek	1	MohaveCounty	2582896	CDP		85634	
Walnut Grove	1	Yavapai County	35860	Populated Place		86332	
Walpi	1	Navajo County	24679	Populated Place	First Mesa	86042	
Warren	1	Cochise County	13360	Populated Place	Bisbee	85603	
Washington Camp	1	Santa Cruz County	35906	Populated Place		85624	
Washington Park	1	Gila County	2582897	CDP			
Weedville	1	Maricopa County	13436	Populated Place	Peoria	85301	
Wellton	1	Yuma County	2413467	Civil (town)		85356	
Wellton Hills	1	Yuma County	2582898	CDP			
Wenden	1	La Paz County	2409543	CDP		85357	
Wepo Village	1	Navajo County	24682	Populated Place			
Wet Camp Village	1	Pina County	2612149	CDP		85357	
Wheatfields	1	Apache County	25274	Populated Place		86057	
Wheatfields	1	Gila County	2582899	CDP		86057	
Whetstone	1	Cochise County	2409579	CDP			
Whispering Pines	1	Gila County	2582900	CDP			
Whitecone	1	Navajo County	2582901	CDP		86031	
White Hills	1	Mohave County	2582902	CDP			
White Mountain Lakes	1	Navajo County	2582903	CDP			
White Mountain Lakes Estates	1	Navajo County	40290	Populated Place	White Mountain Lake		
Whiteriver	1	Navajo County	2409588	CDP		85941	
Why	1	Pima County	2582904	CDP		85321	
Wickchoupai	1	Pima County	24689	Populated Place			
Wickenburg	1	Maricopa County	2413484	Civil (town)		85358	
Wide Ruins	1	Apache County	2582905	CDP		86502	
Wikieup	1	Mohave County	2582906	CDP		85360	
Wilhoit	1	Yavapai County	2409594	CDP		86332	
Willcox	1	Cochise County	2412266	Civil (city)		85643	
Williams	1	Coconino County	2412267	Civil (city)		86046	
Williamson	1	Yavapai County	2409597	CDP			
Willow Canyon	1	Pima County	2582907	CDP			
Willow Springs	1	Coconino County	24692	Populated Place			
Willow Valley	1	Mohave County	2409600	CDP			
Window Rock	1	Apache County	2409610	CDP		86515	
Winkelman	2	Gila County	2413499	Populated Place		85292	
Winona	1	Coconino County	36324	Populated Place		86001	
Winslow	1	Navajo County	2412286	Civil (city)		86047	
Winslow West	2	Coconino County	2409612	CDP			
Wintersburg	1	Maricopa County	2582908	CDP		85322	
Wittmann	1	Maricopa County	2582909	CDP		85361	
Woodruff	1	Navajo County	2582910	CDP		85942	

== Y ==
Name of place	Number of counties	Principal county	GNIS #(s)	Class	Located in	ZIP code	
Name of place	Number of counties	Principal county	GNIS #(s)	Class	Located in	Lower	Upper
Yarnell	1	Yavapai County	2409635	CDP		85362	
Yava	1	Yavapai County	24697	Populated Place		86301	
York	1	Greenlee County	2582911	CDP		85534	
Young	1	Gila County	2409639	CDP		85554	
Youngberg	1	Pinal County	29401	Populated Place			
Youngtown	1	Maricopa County	2413523	Civil (town)		85363	
Yucca	1	Mohave County	2582912	CDP		86438	
Yuma	1	Yuma County	2412328	Civil (city)		85364	69

== Z ==
Name of place	Number of counties	Principal county	GNIS #(s)	Class	Located in	ZIP code	
Name of place	Number of counties	Principal county	GNIS #(s)	Class	Located in	Lower	Upper
Zeniff	1	Navajo County	36502	Populated Place			
