= List of places in Arizona (E) =

This is a list of cities, towns, unincorporated communities, counties, and other places in the U.S. state of Arizona, which start with the letter E. This list is derived from the Geographic Names Information System, which has numerous errors, so it also includes many ghost towns and historical places that are not necessarily communities or actual populated places. This list also includes information on the number and names of counties in which the place lies, its lower and upper ZIP code bounds, if applicable, its U.S. Geological Survey (USGS) reference number(s) (called the GNIS), class as designated by the USGS, and incorporated community located in (if applicable).

== E ==
Name of place	Number of counties	Principal county	GNIS #(s)	Class	Located in	ZIP code	
Name of place	Number of counties	Principal county	GNIS #(s)	Class	Located in	Lower	Upper
Eagar	1	Apache County	2412455	Civil (Town)		85925	
East Fork	1	Navajo County	2408706	CDP		85941	
East Globe	1	Navajo County	2582777	CDP		85941	
East Mesa	1	Maricopa County	36971	Populated Place			
East Sahuarita	1	Pima County	1853157	Populated Place			
East Verde Estates	1	Maricopa County	2582778	CDP			
Eden	1	Graham County	4351	Populated Place		85543	
Ehrenberg	1	La Paz County	2408050	CDP		85334	
El Capitan	1	Gila County	2582779	CDP			
Elden Pueblo	1	Coconino County	28842	Populated Place			
Eleven Mile Corner	1	Pinal County	24404	Populated Place		85222	
Elfrida	1	Cochise County	2582781	CDP		85610	
Elgin	1	Santa Cruz County	2408073	CDP		85611	
El Mirage	1	Maricopa County	2410412	Civil (City)		85335	
Eloy	1	Pinal County	2410433	Civil (City)		85231	
El Prado Estates	1	Yuma County	2582782	CDP		85369	
El Tule	1	Apache County	24403	Populated Place			
Emery	1	Graham County	4432	Populated Place			
Emika	1	Pima County	24406	Populated Place			
Entro	1	Yavapai County	28909	Populated Place			
Estrella	1	Maricopa County	24411	Populated Place			
