= List of places in Arizona (D) =

This is a list of cities, towns, unincorporated communities, counties, and other places in the U.S. state of Arizona, which start with the letter D. This list is derived from the Geographic Names Information System, which has numerous errors, so it also includes many ghost towns and historical places that are not necessarily communities or actual populated places. This list also includes information on the number and names of counties in which the place lies, its lower and upper ZIP code bounds, if applicable, its U.S. Geological Survey (USGS) reference number(s) (called the GNIS), class as designated by the USGS, and incorporated community located in (if applicable).

== D ==
Name of place	Number of counties	Principal county	GNIS #(s)	Class	Located in	ZIP code	
Name of place	Number of counties	Principal county	GNIS #(s)	Class	Located in	Lower	Upper
Dateland	1	Yuma County	2582769	CDP		85333	
Davis-Monthan Air Force Base	1	Pima County	2512157	Military		85708	
Deer Creek	1	Gila County	2582770	CDP			
Deer Valley	1	Maricopa County	24821	Populated Place	Phoenix	85029	
Del Muerto	1	Apache County	2582771	CDP			
Dennehotso	1	Apache County	2408658	CDP		86535	
Desert Hills	1	Mohave County	2408664	CDP		86403	
Desert Wells	1	La Paz County	3878	Populated Place	Vicksburg		
Dewey-Humboldt	1	Yavapai County	2412424	Civil (Town)			
Dilkon	1	Navajo County	2408670	CDP		86047	
Dobson Ranch	1	Maricopa County	24833	Populated Place	Mesa		
Dolan Springs	1	Mohave County	2408678	CDP		86441	
Dome	1	Yuma County	4007	Populated Place		85369	
Donovan Estates	1	Yuma County	2582773	CDP			
Doney Park	1	Coconino County	2582772	CDP			
Doney Park	1	Yuma County	2582773	CDP			
Dos Cabezas	1	Cochise County	4036	Populated Place		85643	
Double Adobe	1	Cochise County	4047	Populated Place		85617	
Douglas	1	Cochise County	2410349	Civil (City)		85607	
Dragoon	1	Cochise County	2582774	CDP		85609	
Drake	1	Yavapai County	28592	Populated Place		86334	
Dreamland Villa	1	Maricopa County	36969	Populated Place		85205	
Drexel Heights	1	Pima County	2408687	CDP		85706	
Dripping Springs	1	Gila County	2582775	CDP			
Drysdale	1	Yuma County	2582776	CDP			
Dudleyville	1	Pinal County	2408693	CDP		85292	
Dugas	1	Yavapai County	28668	Populated Place			
Duncan	1	Greenlee County	2412451	Civil (Town)		85534	
Duquesne	1	Santa Cruz County	28680	Populated Place			
