= Wheatfields =

Wheatfields may refer to:

- Wheatfields, Gila County, Arizona, a Census-designated place
- Wheatfields, Apache County, Arizona, a populated place

== See also ==
- Wheatfield (disambiguation)
