= Copper Hill =

Copper Hill may refer to:

- Copper Hill, Arizona
- Copper Hill, New Jersey
- Copper Hill, Virginia
