= Star Valley, Arizona =

Town in Gila County, Arizona

- Town
- Flag

- Location of Star Valley in Gila County, Arizona

- Location in the United States
- Coordinates: 34°15′40″N 111°13′20″W
- Country: United States
- State: Arizona
- Counties: Gila
- Incorporated: 2005

Government
  - Type: Council-manager

Area
  - Total: 36.15 sq mi (93.64 km^{2})
  - Land: 36.14 sq mi (93.61 km^{2})
  - Water: 0.0077 sq mi (0.02 km^{2})
- Elevation: 4,859 ft (1,481 m)

Population (2020)
  - Total: 2,484
  - Density: 68.7/sq mi (26.54/km^{2})
- Time zone: UTC-7 (MST (no DST))
- ZIP code: 85541
- Area code: 928
- FIPS code: 04-69480
- GNIS feature ID: 2413328
- Website: starvalleyaz.com

Star Valley is a town in Gila County, Arizona, United States, incorporated in 2005. Before incorporation, it was a census-designated place (CDP). As of the 2020 census the population of the town was 2,484.

== Geography ==
Star Valley is located in northern Gila County and is bordered to the west by the town of Payson. Arizona State Route 260 passes through Star Valley, leading west 4 miles (6 km) into Payson and east 85 miles (137 km) to Show Low.

According to the United States Census Bureau, the town has a total area of 36.1 square miles (93.6 km^{2}), of which 0.01 square miles (0.02 km^{2}), or 0.03%, is water. Star Valley sits at an elevation of 4,650 feet (1,420 m) and takes its name from the valley in which it is located, formed by Houston Creek, which descends to the south through Tonto National Forest to Tonto Creek, a tributary of the Salt River. The town was incorporated as the Town of Diamond Star, but changed its name to Star Valley in 2006.

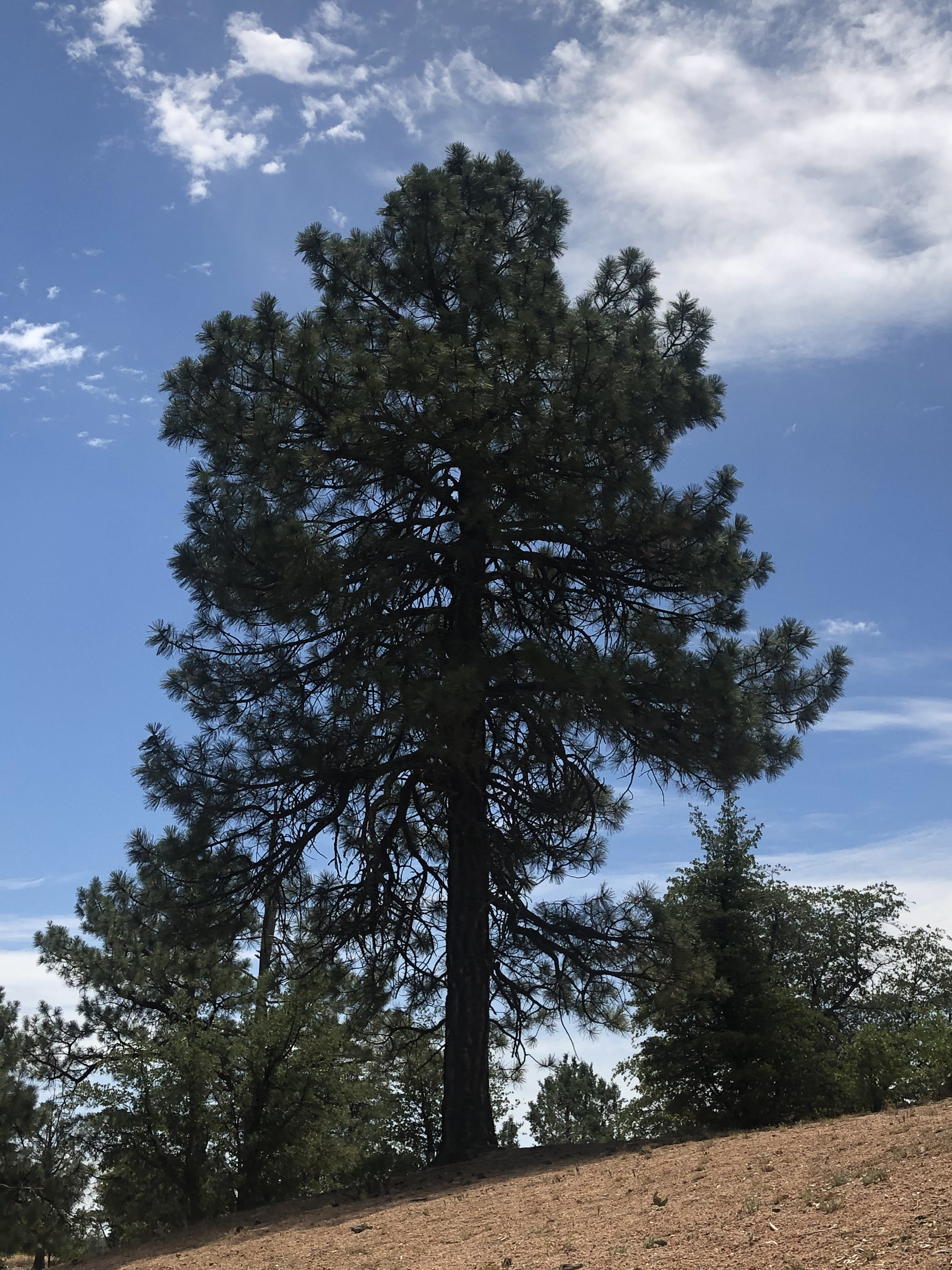
Magnificent Ponderosa pine, abundant elk and the proximity of the Mogollon Rim set the tone of the town.

== Demographics ==
Historical population
| Census | Pop. | Note | %± |
|---|---|---|---|
| 2000 | 1,536 | | — |
| 2010 | 2,310 | | 50.4% |
| 2020 | 2,484 | | 7.5% |
U.S. Decennial Census

=== 2020 census ===
As of the 2020 census, Star Valley had a population of 2,484. The median age was 59.2 years. 14.9% of residents were under the age of 18 and 37.7% of residents were 65 years of age or older. For every 100 females there were 99.0 males, and for every 100 females age 18 and over there were 97.6 males age 18 and over.

59.9% of residents lived in urban areas, while 40.1% lived in rural areas.

There were 1,257 households in Star Valley, of which 15.7% had children under the age of 18 living in them. Of all households, 41.4% were married-couple households, 25.1% were households with a male householder and no spouse or partner present, and 27.8% were households with a female householder and no spouse or partner present. About 40.8% of all households were made up of individuals and 24.9% had someone living alone who was 65 years of age or older.

There were 1,650 housing units, of which 23.8% were vacant. The homeowner vacancy rate was 3.0% and the rental vacancy rate was 19.9%.

Racial composition as of the 2020 census
| Race | Number | Percent |
|---|---|---|
| White | 2,212 | 89.0% |
| Black or African American | 6 | 0.2% |
| American Indian and Alaska Native | 28 | 1.1% |
| Asian | 9 | 0.4% |
| Native Hawaiian and Other Pacific Islander | 2 | 0.1% |
| Some other race | 56 | 2.3% |
| Two or more races | 171 | 6.9% |
| Hispanic or Latino (of any race) | 224 | 9.0% |

=== 2000 census ===
As of the census of 2000, there were 1,536 people, 677 households, and 421 families residing in the CDP. The population density was 241.9 inhabitants per square mile (93.4/km^{2}). There were 1,017 housing units at an average density of 160.1 per square mile (61.8/km^{2}). The racial makeup of the CDP was 93.6% White, 0.1% Black or African American, 0.7% Native American, 0.3% Asian, 0.1% Pacific Islander, 3.8% from other races, and 1.6% from two or more races. 10.3% of the population were Hispanic or Latino of any race.

There were 677 households, out of which 24.4% had children under the age of 18 living with them, 51.1% were married couples living together, 7.7% had a female householder with no husband present, and 37.8% were non-families. 32.1% of all households were made up of individuals, and 15.1% had someone living alone who was 65 years of age or older. The average household size was 2.27 and the average family size was 2.86.

In the CDP, the population was spread out, with 22.9% under the age of 18, 6.0% from 18 to 24, 21.9% from 25 to 44, 28.1% from 45 to 64, and 21.2% who were 65 years of age or older. The median age was 44 years. For every 100 females, there were 98.4 males. For every 100 females age 18 and over, there were 95.2 males.

The median income for a household in the CDP was $27,375, and the median income for a family was $32,045. Males had a median income of $30,966 versus $20,729 for females. The per capita income for the CDP was $19,414. About 4.7% of families and 9.7% of the population were below the poverty line, including 7.4% of those under age 18 and 6.5% of those age 65 or over.

== Transportation ==
The Payson Senior Center operates the Beeline Bus, which provides local bus service between Payson and Star Valley.

== Government ==
Star Valley uses a council-manager government form with a town council. As of February 2020, the mayor was Gary Coon and the current town manager was Timothy Grier.

== Education ==
It is in the Payson Unified School District. Payson High School is the zoned comprehensive high school.

== Gallery ==
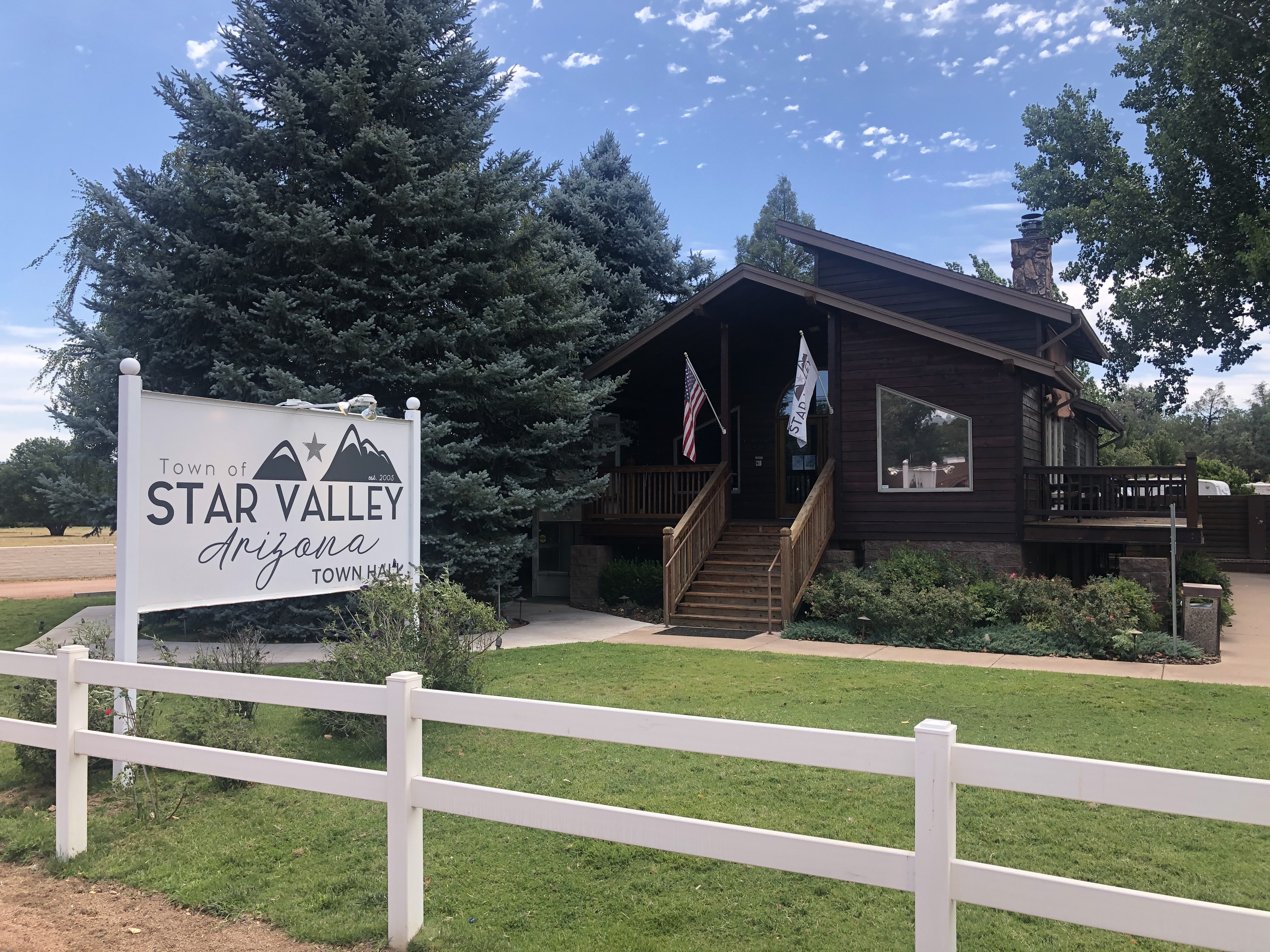
Star Valley Town Hall

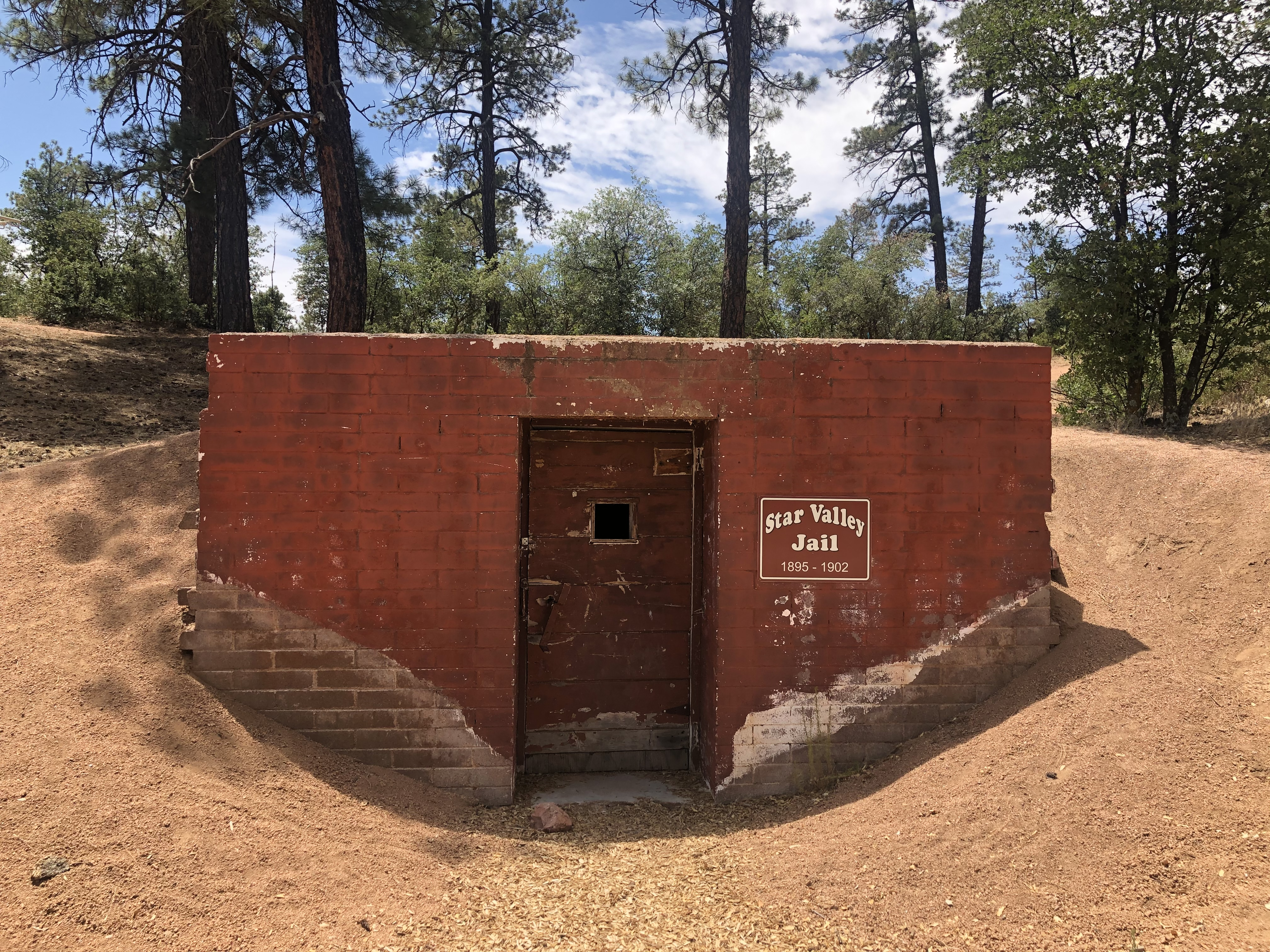
Star Valley Jail 1895–1902

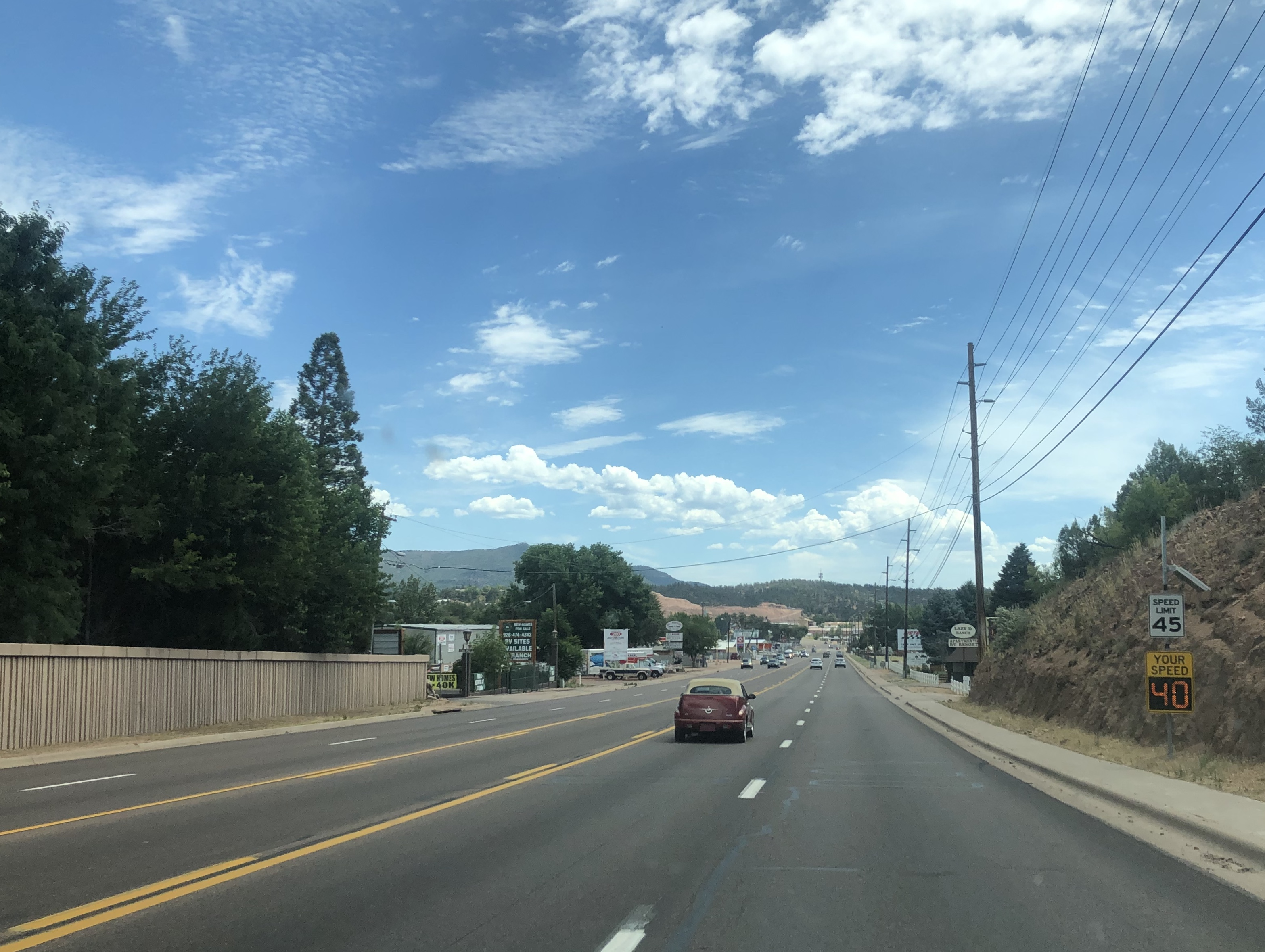
Star Valley is bisected by Highway 260. Local businesses line both sides of the highway.
