= Central Heights-Midland City, Arizona =

CDP in Gila County, Arizona

- Census-designated place
- Location in Gila County and the state of Arizona

- Location in the United States
- Coordinates: 33°24′36″N 110°48′59″W
- Country: United States
- State: Arizona
- County: Gila

Area
  - Total: 1.94 sq mi (5.03 km^{2})
  - Land: 1.94 sq mi (5.03 km^{2})
  - Water: 0 sq mi (0.00 km^{2})

Population (2020)
  - Total: 2,319
  - Density: 1,195.2/sq mi (461.48/km^{2})
- Time zone: UTC-7 (MST (no DST))
- FIPS code: 04-11720

Central Heights-Midland City is an unincorporated community and census-designated place (CDP) in Gila County, Arizona, United States. The area is home to the Pinal Cemetery which serves the community in gereneral but also contains Croatian and Serbian dedicated sections. The Gila County Health and Human Services offices are located within the region. One of the communities few nurseries is located along Golden Hill Road, a notable road in the Central Heights-Midland City area. The population was 2,534 at the 2010 census.

== Geography ==
Central Heights-Midland City is located in southern Gila County at 33°24′36″N 110°48′59″W (33.409863, -110.816499). It is bordered to the north, east and northwest by the city of Globe, the Gila County seat, and partially to the west by the unincorporated community of Claypool. U.S. Route 60 passes just north of the CDP, within the Globe city limits, leading southeast 3 miles (5 km) to the center of Globe and southwest 3.5 miles (5.6 km) to the town of Miami.

According to the United States Census Bureau, the Central Heights-Midland City CDP has a total area of 1.95 square miles (5.04 km^{2}), all land.

== Demographics ==
Historical population
Census	Pop.	Note	%±
2000	2,694		—
2010	2,534		−5.9%
2020	2,319		−8.5%
U.S. Decennial Census

=== 2020 census ===
As of the 2020 census, Central Heights-Midland City had a population of 2,319. The median age was 43.5 years. 22.8% of residents were under the age of 18 and 22.6% of residents were 65 years of age or older. For every 100 females there were 101.5 males, and for every 100 females age 18 and over there were 96.8 males age 18 and over.

98.0% of residents lived in urban areas, while 2.0% lived in rural areas.

There were 959 households in Central Heights-Midland City, of which 26.0% had children under the age of 18 living in them. Of all households, 38.8% were married-couple households, 24.6% were households with a male householder and no spouse or partner present, and 29.8% were households with a female householder and no spouse or partner present. About 33.5% of all households were made up of individuals and 20.2% had someone living alone who was 65 years of age or older.

There were 1,122 housing units, of which 14.5% were vacant. The homeowner vacancy rate was 3.5% and the rental vacancy rate was 6.8%.

Racial composition as of the 2020 census
Race	Number	Percent
White	1,671	72.1%
Black or African American	18	0.8%
American Indian and Alaska Native	84	3.6%
Asian	1	0.0%
Native Hawaiian and Other Pacific Islander	0	0.0%
Some other race	233	10.0%
Two or more races	312	13.5%
Hispanic or Latino (of any race)	765	33.0%

=== 2000 census ===
As of the census of 2000, there were 2,694 people, 1,061 households, and 758 families residing in the CDP. The population density was 1,575.3 inhabitants per square mile (608.2/km^{2}). There were 1,175 housing units at an average density of 687.1 per square mile (265.3/km^{2}). The racial makeup of the CDP was 87.2% White, <0.1% Black or African American, 1.0% Native American, 0.2% Asian, 0.2% Pacific Islander, 9.2% from other races, and 2.1% from two or more races. 25.4% of the population were Hispanic or Latino of any race.

There were 1,061 households, out of which 29.2% had children under the age of 18 living with them, 55.7% were married couples living together, 11.6% had a female householder with no husband present, and 28.5% were non-families. 26.0% of all households were made up of individuals, and 13.3% had someone living alone who was 65 years of age or older. The average household size was 2.54 and the average family size was 3.02.

In the CDP, the age distribution of the population shows 26.7% under the age of 18, 7.2% from 18 to 24, 23.5% from 25 to 44, 25.9% from 45 to 64, and 16.7% who were 65 years of age or older. The median age was 40 years. For every 100 females, there were 92.6 males. For every 100 females age 18 and over, there were 90.5 males.

The median income for a household in the CDP was $30,577, and the median income for a family was $35,729. Males had a median income of $41,042 versus $20,139 for females. The per capita income for the CDP was $13,814. About 14.9% of families and 16.7% of the population were below the poverty line, including 21.7% of those under age 18 and 14.8% of those age 65 or over.
