= Tonto Basin Elementary School District =

School district in Arizona, United States

Address
- 445 South Old West Highway 188 Tonto Basin, Arizona, 85553; United States

District information
- Type: Public
- Grades: PreK–8
- NCES District ID: 0405760

Students and staff
- Students: 69
- Teachers: 7.0
- Staff: 13.44
- Student–teacher ratio: 9.86

Other information
- Website: www.tontobasinschool.org

Tonto School District 33 is a school district in Gila County, Arizona.
