= Six Shooter Canyon, Arizona =

CDP in Gila County, Arizona

- Census-designated place
- Location within Arizona Location within the United States
- Coordinates: 33°21′54″N 110°46′3″W
- Country: United States
- State: Arizona
- County: Gila

Area
  - Total: 2.96 sq mi (7.67 km^{2})
  - Land: 2.96 sq mi (7.67 km^{2})
  - Water: 0 sq mi (0.00 km^{2})
- Elevation: 3,740 ft (1,140 m)

Population (2020)
  - Total: 958
  - Density: 323.7/sq mi (124.98/km^{2})
- Time zone: UTC-7 (MST (no DST))
- ZIP code: 85501
- Area code: 928
- FIPS code: 04-67295
- GNIS feature ID: 2582866

Six Shooter Canyon is a census-designated place (CDP) in Gila County, Arizona, United States. The population was 1,019 at the 2010 census.

== Geography ==
The CDP is located in southern Gila County, just south of the city of Globe. It is bordered to the west by the Icehouse Canyon CDP, to the north by Pinal, and to the east by an outer part of the city of Globe. Six Shooter Canyon is drained by Pinal Creek, which flows north through the center of Globe and eventually to the Salt River near Theodore Roosevelt Lake. According to the United States Census Bureau, the CDP has a total area of 2.92 square miles (7.55 km^{2}), all land.

Six Shooter Canyon is the location of the Gila Pueblo campus of Eastern Arizona College.

== Demographics ==
Historical population
Census	Pop.	Note	%±
2020	958		—
U.S. Decennial Census
