= McMillenville, Arizona =

- Populated place
- Location within Arizona Location within the United States
- Coordinates: 33°33′17″N 110°40′44″W
- Country: United States
- State: Arizona
- County: Gila
- Established: circa 1876
- Abandoned: circa 1886
- Named for: Charles McMillen
- Elevation: 4,442 ft (1,354 m)
- Time zone: UTC-7 (MST (no DST))
- Post Office Opened: November 12, 1877
- Post Office Closed: October 12, 1882

McMillenville, also known as McMillianville or McMillanville, is a former populated place in Gila County, Arizona, United States. Silver ore was discovered by chance in 1876 by Theodore H. Harris and Charles McMillen, and the town formed around the ore deposits.

== History ==
On March 26, 1876, Harris and McMillen were heading 28 miles northeast of Globe on a prospecting trip. While traveling through the White Mountains Harris got off his horse as he was too hungover to proceed farther. He went to sleep so McMillen stopped, dismounted and sat down on a nearby ledge. Boredom led McMillen to drive his pick into the rock and discovered silver. The pair founded the Stonewall Jackson mine which eventually turned into McMillenville, named after McMillen who discovered the silver. The town grew fast and a year later on November 12, 1877, a post office was opened. At its peak, 1,000 settlers lived there. The town soon was bolstered with several adobe saloons, dance halls, boarding houses, casinos, as well as homes for hundreds of people, public buildings and the mining structures. The town's first bloodshed came in 1880 over a mining claim dispute. Jack Brown the founder of the claim established a camp which another prospector intended to exploit. After Jack Brown and his killer had a long argument, the two met on the main street and fought a duel. Both men fired their revolvers true and they both died from a gunshot wound seconds later. McMillenville's peak was in 1880, the original five-stamp mill was replaced with by twenty-stamps. A new hoisting mechanism was erected for lifting ore out of the shaft. Silver ingots were taken about 100 miles to Casa Grande. The town was booming until 1882 when Geronimo's warriors attacked; it became a ghost town by 1886.

=== Battle of McMillenville ===
The Apache attack was one of many engagements of the Indian wars in Arizona. It was fought on July 7, 1882. Geronimo's warriors, who had escaped the nearby San Carlos Reservation, were raiding throughout the area. Hundreds of natives fled after the Battle of Cibecue Creek who then went to Mexico or began raided across the Southwest. Hostilities became pitched when locals reported the large number of Apache warriors approaching the town. The women and children were rushed to the mine shaft with a few men for protection, the rest armed themselves and made a position out of a large two-story adobe building. The Apaches attacked with dozens of warriors, they swarmed the small town until they reached the makeshift fortification. There several settlers defeated the attack with accurate fire. Only one American was wounded in the arm. The natives' casualties are not known; the Apache usually concealed their casualties by removing bodies and wounded men from the field. The warriors retreated after cavalry from Fort Apache began to arrive. Several buildings were damaged in the fighting, some from fire. The natives used primarily rifles and pistols with some bow and arrows compared to various firearms used by the settlers. The battle was an American victory with little loss but McMillenville was still abandoned within the next few years.

== Remnants ==
Almost nothing remains of the mines and mill, and only scattered ruins of the adobe buildings of the town mark the site of McMillenville today.

== Geography ==
The town is located off U.S. Route 60, about 18 miles (29 km) Northeast of Globe.

== Geology ==
The Stonewall Jackson mine was one of the best producing mines in the area at the time, mainly producing silver, copper and lead.
