= Christopher Creek =

Waterway in Gila County, Arizona

Location
- Country: United States
- State: Arizona

Physical characteristics
- Source: Natural Springs
  - location: White Mountains, Arizona
  - coordinates: 34°22′07″N 111°01′18″W
  - elevation: 6,600 ft (2,000 m)
- Mouth: Arroyo Valley
  - location: White Mountains
  - coordinates: 34°18′37″N 111°04′23″W
  - elevation: 5,100 ft (1,600 m)

Christopher Creek is located at the base of the Mogollon Rim in the state of Arizona. The nearby town of Christopher Creek is named after this body of water. The closest city Payson is 22 mi (35 km) west of Christopher Creek.

== Fish species ==
- Rainbow trout
- Brown trout
- Brook trout
