= Cedar Creek, Arizona =

Census-designated place in Gila County, Arizona, United States

- Census-designated place
- Location of Cedar Creek in Gila County, Arizona.

- Location within Arizona Location within the United States
- Coordinates: 33°53′44″N 110°10′25″W
- Country: United States
- State: Arizona
- County: Gila

Area
  - Total: 17.03 sq mi (44.12 km^{2})
  - Land: 17.03 sq mi (44.12 km^{2})
  - Water: 0 sq mi (0.00 km^{2})
- Elevation: 4,928 ft (1,502 m)

Population (2020)
  - Total: 372
  - Density: 21.8/sq mi (8.43/km^{2})
- Time zone: UTC-7 (Mountain (MST))
- ZIP code: 85542
- Area code: 928
- GNIS feature ID: 2619

Cedar Creek is a census-designated place in Gila County, Arizona, United States, on the Fort Apache Indian Reservation. Cedar Creek is located along Arizona State Route 73. The population in 2010 was 318.

== Geography ==
Cedar Creek is located at 33.891399°N 110.195707°W.

According to the U.S. Census Bureau, the community has an area of 17.035 square miles (44.12 km^{2}), all land.

== Demographics ==
Historical population
Census	Pop.	Note	%±
2020	372		—
U.S. Decennial Census

== Transportation ==
The White Mountain Apache Tribe operates the Fort Apache Connection Transit, which provides local bus service.

== See also ==
- List of census-designated places in Arizona
