= Cactus Flats, Arizona =

CDP in Graham County, Arizona

- Census-designated place
- Location of Cactus Flats in Graham County, Arizona.

- Location within Arizona Location within the United States
- Coordinates: 32°45′25″N 109°43′05″W
- Country: United States
- State: Arizona
- County: Graham

Area
  - Total: 6.27 sq mi (16.23 km^{2})
  - Land: 6.22 sq mi (16.11 km^{2})
  - Water: 0.050 sq mi (0.13 km^{2})
- Elevation: 3,124 ft (952 m)

Population (2020)
  - Total: 1,524
  - Density: 245.1/sq mi (94.63/km^{2})
- Time zone: UTC-7 (Mountain (MST))
- Area code: 928
- GNIS feature ID: 2582744

Cactus Flats is a census-designated place in Graham County, Arizona, United States. Its population was 1,524 as of the 2020 census.

== Demographics ==
Historical population
| Census | Pop. | Note | %± |
|---|---|---|---|
| 2010 | 1,518 | | — |
| 2020 | 1,524 | | 0.4% |
U.S. Decennial Census

=== 2020 census ===
As of the 2020 census, Cactus Flats had a population of 1,524. The median age was 40.0 years. 26.6% of residents were under the age of 18 and 16.1% of residents were 65 years of age or older. For every 100 females there were 105.9 males, and for every 100 females age 18 and over there were 99.5 males age 18 and over.

0.0% of residents lived in urban areas, while 100.0% lived in rural areas.

There were 539 households in Cactus Flats, of which 39.0% had children under the age of 18 living in them. Of all households, 54.0% were married-couple households, 14.3% were households with a male householder and no spouse or partner present, and 24.1% were households with a female householder and no spouse or partner present. About 18.9% of all households were made up of individuals and 6.3% had someone living alone who was 65 years of age or older.

There were 618 housing units, of which 12.8% were vacant. The homeowner vacancy rate was 2.1% and the rental vacancy rate was 9.2%.

Racial composition as of the 2020 census
| Race | Number | Percent |
|---|---|---|
| White | 1,184 | 77.7% |
| Black or African American | 9 | 0.6% |
| American Indian and Alaska Native | 22 | 1.4% |
| Asian | 2 | 0.1% |
| Native Hawaiian and Other Pacific Islander | 2 | 0.1% |
| Some other race | 112 | 7.3% |
| Two or more races | 193 | 12.7% |
| Hispanic or Latino (of any race) | 430 | 28.2% |

=== 2010 census ===
Cactus Flats first appeared on the 2010 U.S. Census as a census-designated place (CDP).
