= Christopher Creek, Arizona =

CDP in Gila County, Arizona

- Census-designated place
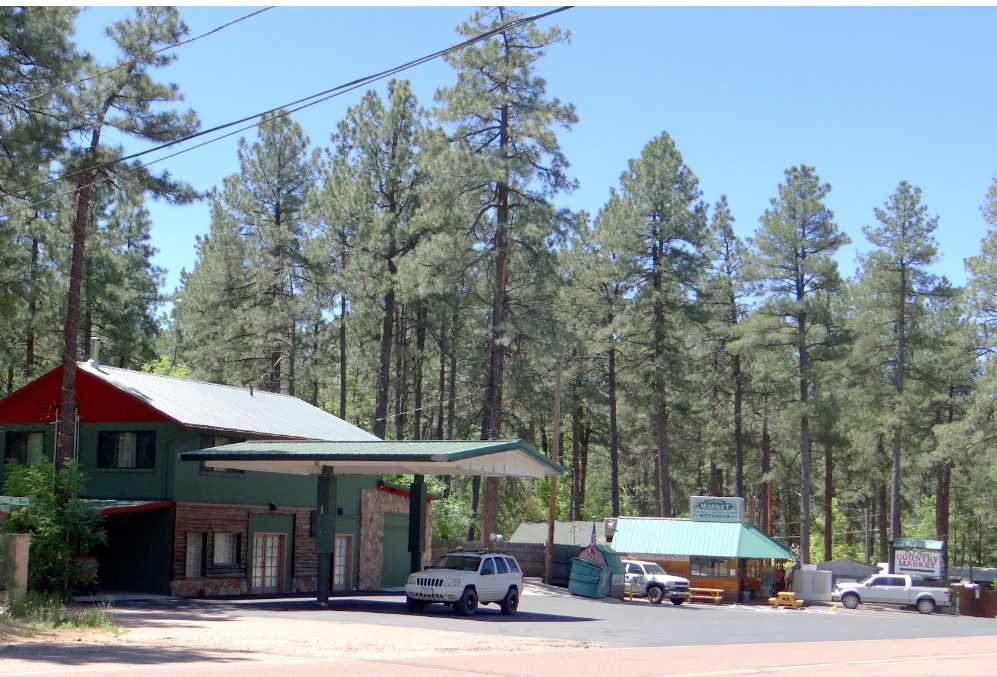

- Location of Christopher Creek in Gila County, Arizona.

- Location within Arizona Location within the United States
- Coordinates: 34°21′17.98″N 111°1′17.90″W
- Country: United States
- State: Arizona
- County: Gila

Area
  - Total: 3.14 sq mi (8.13 km^{2})
  - Land: 3.14 sq mi (8.13 km^{2})
  - Water: 0 sq mi (0.00 km^{2})
- Elevation: 5,961 ft (1,817 m)

Population (2020)
  - Total: 121
  - Density: 38.5/sq mi (14.88/km^{2})
- Time zone: UTC−7 (MST)
  - Summer (DST): UTC−7 (no DST/PDT)
- ZIP code: 85541
- Area code: 928
- FIPS code: 04-13140
- GNIS ID(s): 2582755

Christopher Creek is a census-designated place in northern Gila County in the U.S. state of Arizona. Situated at the base of the Mogollon Rim, the community lies at an elevation of 5,961 feet (1,817 m), and is located approximately 23.5 miles (37.82 km) northeast of Payson, just off SR 260. The population as of the 2010 U.S. census was 156.

Tourism, retirement and timbering are the foundations of Christopher Creek's economy.

== Demographics ==
Historical population
Census	Pop.	Note	%±
2020	121		—
U.S. Decennial Census

== Transportation ==
Mountain Valley Shuttle stops in Christopher Creek on its Phoenix-Show Low route.

== Education ==
It is in the Payson Unified School District. Payson High School is the zoned comprehensive high school.

== See also ==
- Christopher Creek – Geological feature
