= Icehouse Canyon, Arizona =

CDP in Gila County, Arizona

- Census-designated place
- Location within Arizona Location within the United States
- Coordinates: 33°21′19″N 110°47′48″W
- Country: United States
- State: Arizona
- County: Gila

Area
  - Total: 4.85 sq mi (12.57 km^{2})
  - Land: 4.85 sq mi (12.57 km^{2})
  - Water: 0 sq mi (0.00 km^{2})
- Elevation: 3,798 ft (1,158 m)

Population (2020)
  - Total: 574
  - Density: 118.2/sq mi (45.65/km^{2})
- Time zone: UTC-7 (MST (no DST))
- ZIP code: 85501
- Area code: 928
- FIPS code: 04-34980
- GNIS feature ID: 2582800

Icehouse Canyon is a census-designated place (CDP) in Gila County, Arizona, United States. The population was 677 at the 2010 census.

== Geography ==
The CDP is located in southern Gila County, bordered to the north by the city of Globe, the county seat, and to the east by the Six Shooter Canyon CDP. Icehouse Canyon is a mountain valley that extends southwest up into Tonto National Forest. The mouth of the canyon is at its northern end, at Pinal Creek, which flows northwest through the center of Globe. Residences in the community are built along Icehouse Canyon Road and along Kellner Canyon Road, which branches to the west-southwest off Icehouse Canyon. According to the United States Census Bureau, the CDP has a total area of 4.9 square miles (12.7 km^{2}), all land.

== Demographics ==
Historical population
Census	Pop.	Note	%±
2010	677		—
2020	574		−15.2%
U.S. Decennial Census
