= Roosevelt Estates, Arizona =

CDP in Gila County, Arizona

- Census-designated place
- Location within Arizona Location within the United States
- Coordinates: 33°37′19″N 111°0′11″W
- Country: United States
- State: Arizona
- County: Gila

Area
  - Total: 4.81 sq mi (12.46 km^{2})
  - Land: 4.81 sq mi (12.45 km^{2})
  - Water: 0.0039 sq mi (0.01 km^{2})
- Elevation: 2,200 ft (670 m)

Population (2020)
  - Total: 449
  - Density: 93.4/sq mi (36.07/km^{2})
- Time zone: UTC-7 (MST (no DST))
- ZIP Code: 85545 (Roosevelt)
- FIPS code: 04-61302
- GNIS feature ID: 2805227

Roosevelt Estates is an unincorporated community and census-designated place (CDP) in Gila County, Arizona, United States. It is located near the southeast end of Theodore Roosevelt Lake, a reservoir on the Salt River. It was first listed as a CDP prior to the 2020 census. Arizona State Route 188 runs through Roosevelt Estates.

== Demographics ==
Historical population
Census	Pop.	Note	%±
2020	449		—
U.S. Decennial Census
