= Gisela, Arizona =

CDP in Gila County, Arizona

- Census-designated place
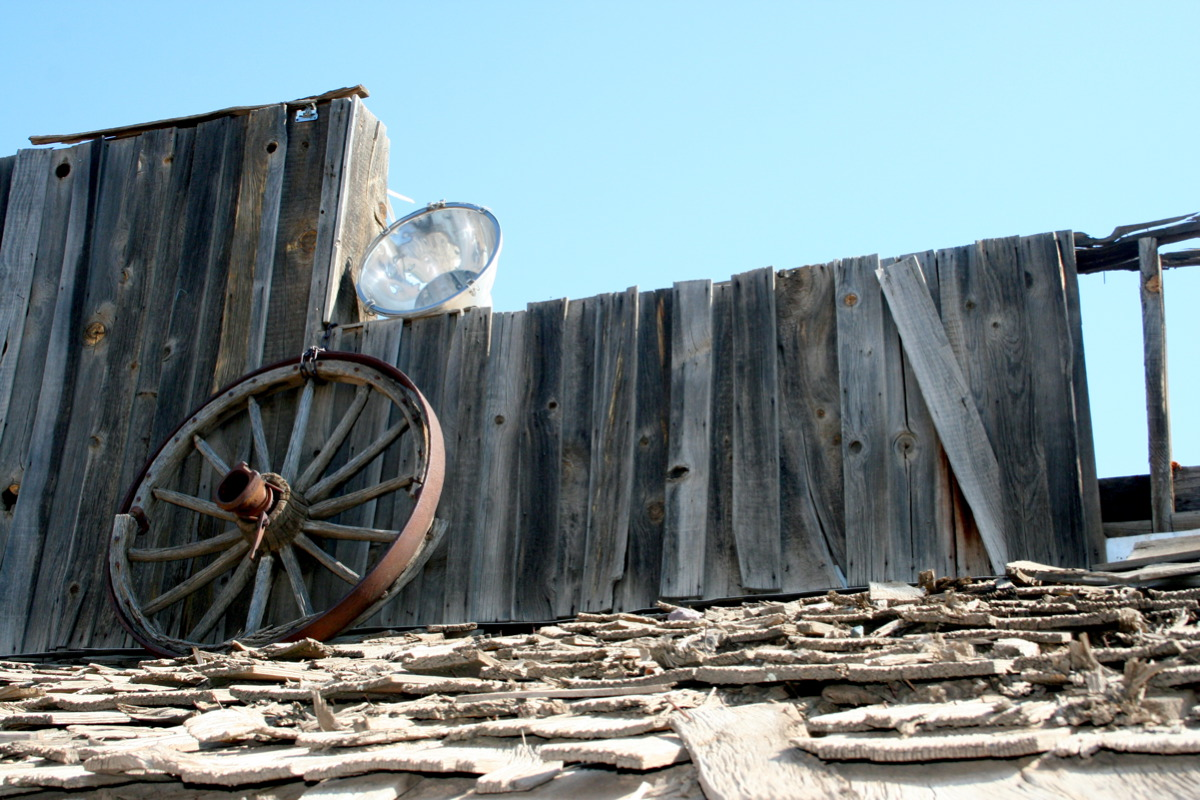
- Old store in Gisela

- Location of Gisela, Arizona

- Location in the United States
- Coordinates: 34°6′7″N 111°17′7″W
- Country: United States
- State: Arizona
- County: Gila

Area
  - Total: 2.88 sq mi (7.46 km^{2})
  - Land: 2.86 sq mi (7.41 km^{2})
  - Water: 0.019 sq mi (0.05 km^{2})
- Elevation: 2,881 ft (878 m)

Population (2020)
  - Total: 536
  - Density: 187.3/sq mi (72.32/km^{2})
- Time zone: UTC-7 (Mountain (MST))
- ZIP code: 85541
- Area code: 928
- FIPS code: 04-27540
- GNIS feature ID: 29332

Gisela (/ɡaɪˈsiːlə/ ghy-SEE-lə) is an unincorporated community and census-designated place (CDP) in Gila County, Arizona, United States. The population was 570 at the 2010 census.

Gisela was named after the heroine in the book Countess Gisela by E. Marlitt. The town schoolteacher was reading the book to her students when she was asked by her husband, the postmaster, to help name the little settlement. She asked the school children what names they liked, and they voted to name their new town Gisela. The students did not know how to pronounce the name correctly, so they called it /ɡaɪˈsiːlə/ ghy-SEE-lə.

== Geography ==
Gisela is located in northwestern Gila County at 34°6′7″N 111°17′7″W (34.101809, -111.285194). It is 5 miles (8 km) east of Arizona State Route 87, the Beeline Highway, and 17 miles (27 km) by road south of Payson.

According to the United States Census Bureau, the Gisela CDP has a total area of 2.9 square miles (7.5 km^{2}), of which 0.02 square miles (0.05 km^{2}), or 0.7%, is water. Tonto Creek flows through Gisela on its way to Roosevelt Lake on the Salt River.

== Demographics ==
Historical population
Census	Pop.	Note	%±
2020	536		—
U.S. Decennial Census

As of the census of 2000, there were 532 people, 225 households, and 161 families residing in the CDP. The population density was 184.8 inhabitants per square mile (71.4/km^{2}). There were 295 housing units at an average density of 102.4 per square mile (39.5/km^{2}). The racial makeup of the CDP was 94.4% White, 0.2% Native American, 2.3% from other races, and 3.2% from two or more races. 5.6% of the population were Hispanic or Latino of any race.

There were 225 households, out of which 23.6% had children under the age of 18 living with them, 59.6% were married couples living together, 6.2% had a female householder with no husband present, and 28.4% were non-families. 24.9% of all households were made up of individuals, and 12.9% had someone living alone who was 65 years of age or older. The average household size was 2.36 and the average family size was 2.81.

In the CDP, the population was spread out, with 22.4% under the age of 18, 4.7% from 18 to 24, 25.4% from 25 to 44, 27.4% from 45 to 64, and 20.1% who were 65 years of age or older. The median age was 43 years. For every 100 females, there were 91.4 males. For every 100 females age 18 and over, there were 97.6 males.

The median income for a household in the CDP was $24,044, and the median income for a family was $28,750. Males had a median income of $31,328 versus $18,472 for females. The per capita income for the CDP was $15,974. About 5.8% of families and 11.2% of the population were below the poverty line, including 17.5% of those under age 18 and 30.2% of those age 65 or over.

== Attractions ==
- The Gisela Ruins are Salado ruins along Tonto Creek just downstream of Gisela.

== Education ==
It is in the Payson Unified School District. Payson High School is the zoned comprehensive high school.
