= Wepo Village, Arizona =

- Populated place
- Location within the state of Arizona Wepo Village (the United States)
- Coordinates: 35°53′36″N 110°22′26″W
- Country: United States
- State: Arizona
- County: Navajo
- Elevation: 5,784 ft (1,763 m)
- Time zone: UTC-7 (Mountain (MST))
  - Summer (DST): UTC-7 (MST)
- Area code: 928
- FIPS code: 04-81565
- GNIS feature ID: 24682

Wepo Village is a populated place situated in Navajo County, Arizona, United States. Located 5 miles north of Walpi, it is within the boundaries of the Hopi Reservation The name comes from the Hopi word for "onion".
