= Dreamland Villa, Arizona =

Unincorporated community in the state of Arizona, United States

- Location within the state of Arizona Dreamland Villa (the United States)
- Coordinates: 33°25′17″N 111°42′38″W
- Country: United States
- State: Arizona
- County: Maricopa
- Elevation: 1,371 ft (418 m)
- Time zone: UTC-7 (Mountain (MST))
  - Summer (DST): UTC-7 (MST)
- Area code: 480
- FIPS code: 04-20470
- GNIS feature ID: 36969

Dreamland Villa is a retirement community situated in Maricopa County, Arizona, United States. It was one of the first retirement communities built in Arizona. Begun as a development in 1959 by Ross Farnsworth, within fifteen years it encompassed 3000 homes. It has an estimated elevation of 1,371 feet (418 m) above sea level.

In 1978, residents opposed annexation by the city of Mesa. In 1979, 80 percent of Dreamland Villa residents supported a county senior citizen zoning area, which limited residents to people over 50 years of age. The measure passed. At this time, around 5,200 people lived in Dreamland Villa.
