= Eleven Mile Corner, Arizona =

Populated place in Pinal County, Arizona

Coordinates: 32°52′46″N 111°34′01″W

Eleven Mile Corner, Arizona, is a former settlement and Rural Postal Station now largely considered to be an unincorporated portion of the city of Casa Grande, with which it now shares a common zip code. The area was so named due to its location being (by old mile markers and former city boundaries) 11 miles to the east of Casa Grande, 11 miles north of Eloy, Arizona, and 11 miles Southwest of Coolidge, Arizona. The area came to be in the early 1940s when State Hwy 87 was cut through approximately 3 miles to the East, and the existing road (now Florence Blvd.) between Casa Grande, Coolidge, and Florence was improved and became a sub-segment and by-way of Hwy 87. A second road was cut through intersecting with Florence Blvd. (now 11 Mile Corner Rd.) connecting Eloy with the O' Odam Tash Indian reservation. This intersection became Eleven Mile Corner.

Two of the highest producing cotton gins of the time were established there, one dedicated to short staple Delta cotton and the other to long staple Pima cotton, both grown in abundance in the area. Several small tracts of worker housing were also built as were several larger home of local land owners and field bosses. A tavern catering to the local cowboys and field bosses was a feature for many years prior to its closing, as was a small gas station, Post Office and general store, UFW Union hall and auditorium, and migrant school. The Pinal County Fairgrounds occupy a large tract just south of the intersection, as did a dirt track auto racing venue. In the 1970s, an upper-middle class housing development and golf course was built and called Tierra Grande. A resort hotel was planned but never built, and the development today is largely lower-middle class and subsidized housing.

Like other communities in Pinal County, the decline of the cotton market limited the growth and progress of the area. Several false starts at development followed, with the 2009–2012 real estate crash decimating the area economically.

Yandell's New Camp Store and Post Office formerly served as the community post office and mail delivering service but has since ceased operation. A John Deere dealership, Stotz Equipment, stands nearby and the Mary C. O'Brian School formerly served special-needs and immigrant children, but has recently expanded to serving the entire community.
