= Pinal, Arizona =

CDP in Gila County, Arizona

- Census-designated place
- Location within Arizona Location within the United States
- Coordinates: 33°22′44″N 110°45′14″W
- Country: United States
- State: Arizona
- County: Gila

Area
  - Total: 0.42 sq mi (1.08 km^{2})
  - Land: 0.42 sq mi (1.08 km^{2})
  - Water: 0 sq mi (0.00 km^{2})
- Elevation: 3,800 ft (1,200 m)

Population (2020)
  - Total: 456
  - Density: 1,092.8/sq mi (421.94/km^{2})
- Time zone: UTC-7 (MST (no DST))
- ZIP code: 85501
- Area code: 928
- FIPS code: 04-55630
- GNIS feature ID: 32906

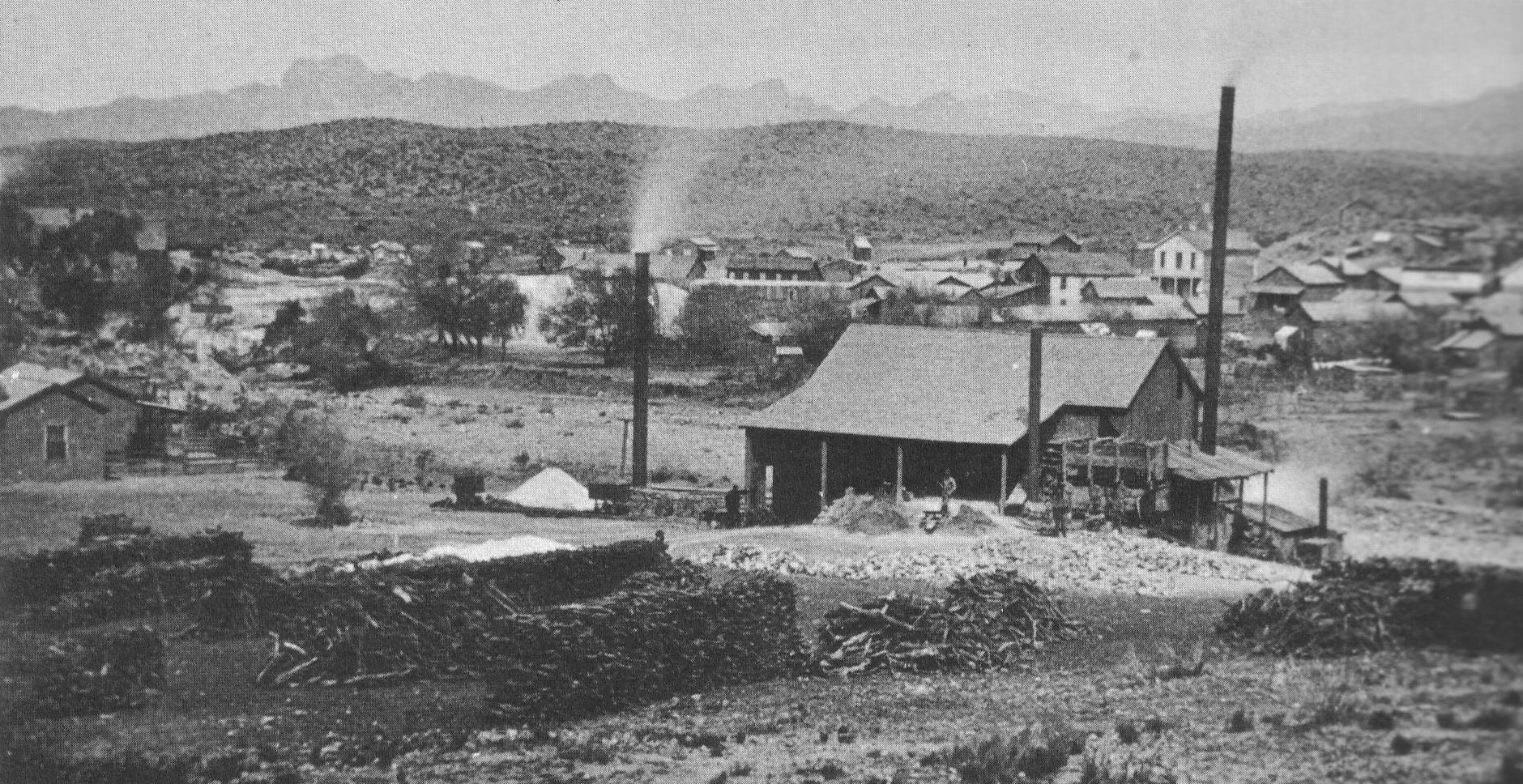
Southeast view of the mill and town of Pinal, circa 1880.

Pinal is a census-designated place (CDP) in Gila County, Arizona, United States. The population was 439 at the 2010 census. It shares the name of nearby Pinal County but is not located there.

== Geography ==
The CDP is located in southern Gila County southeast of the center of Globe, the county seat. The CDP is bordered by the Globe city limits to the north, east, and south. U.S. Route 70 forms the northeast edge of the CDP; downtown Globe is 2.5 miles (4.0 km) to the northwest, and Peridot is 18 miles (29 km) to the southeast. According to the United States Census Bureau, the Pinal CDP has a total area of 0.44 square miles (1.14 km^{2}), all land.

== Demographics ==
Historical population
| Census | Pop. | Note | %± |
|---|---|---|---|
| 2020 | 456 | | — |
U.S. Decennial Census
