= Claypool, Arizona =

CDP in Gila County, Arizona, U.S.

- Census-designated place
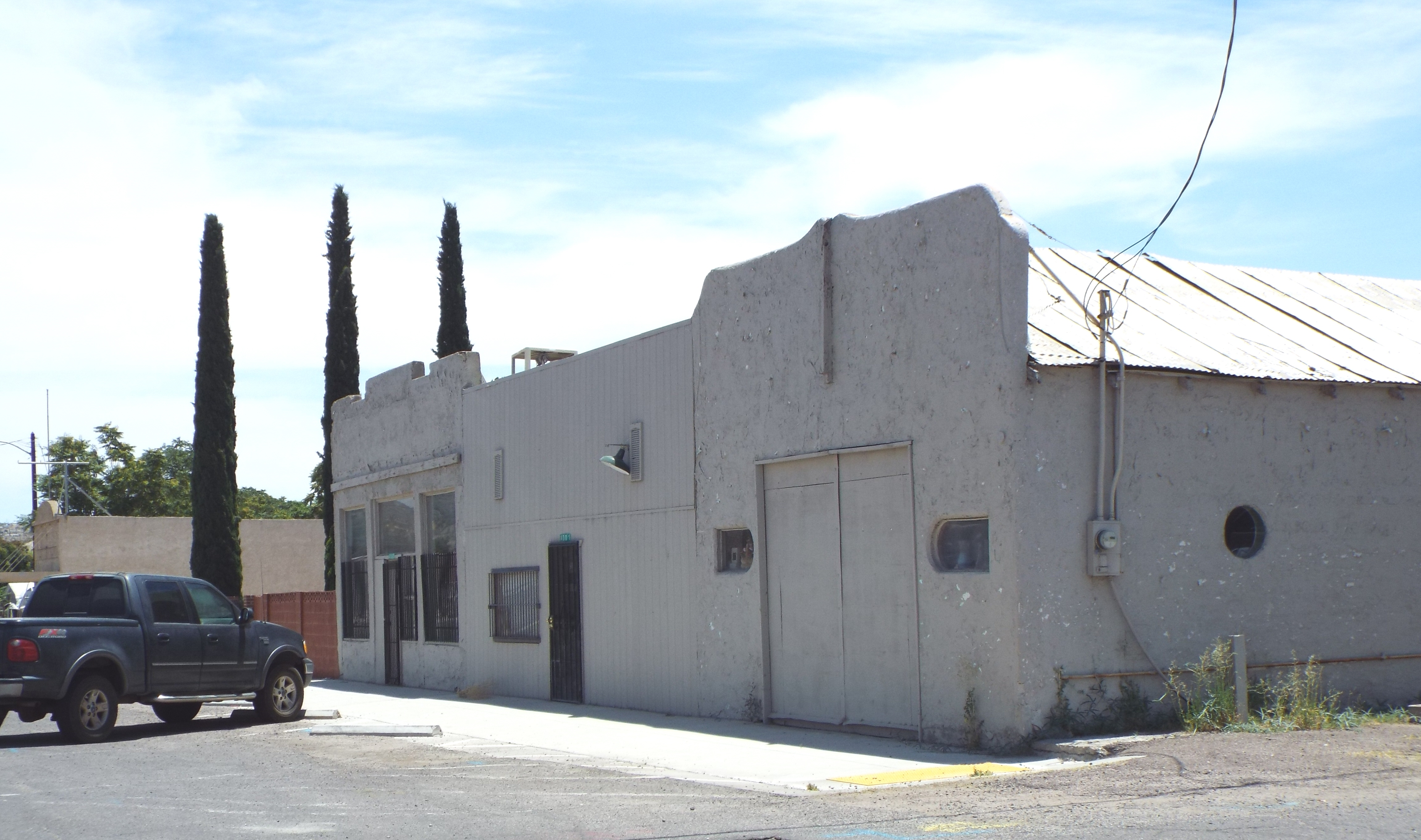
- Downtown Claypool

- Location in Gila County and the state of Arizona
- Coordinates: 33°24′31″N 110°50′51″W
- Country: United States
- State: Arizona
- County: Gila

Area
  - Total: 1.27 sq mi (3.29 km^{2})
  - Land: 1.27 sq mi (3.29 km^{2})
  - Water: 0 sq mi (0.00 km^{2})
- Elevation: 3,327 ft (1,014 m)

Population (2020)
  - Total: 1,395
  - Density: 1,097/sq mi (423.6/km^{2})
- Time zone: UTC-7 (MST (no DST))
- ZIP code: 85532
- Area code: 928
- FIPS code: 04-13960
- GNIS feature ID: 27695

Claypool is a census-designated place (CDP) in Gila County, Arizona, United States. The population was 1,538 at the 2010 census, down from 1,794 at the 2000 census. It was named after W. D. Claypool, a member of both the State House of Representatives and State Senate in the 1910s and 1920s.

== Geography ==
Claypool is located in southern Gila County between Miami to the west and Globe, the county seat, to the east. U.S. Route 60 runs along the northern edge of the community.

According to the United States Census Bureau, the CDP has a total area of 1.17 square miles (3.04 km^{2}), all land.

=== Climate ===
According to the Köppen Climate Classification system, Claypool has a warm-summer Mediterranean climate, abbreviated "Csa" on climate maps.

== Demographics ==
Historical population
Census	Pop.	Note	%±
2020	1,395		—
U.S. Decennial Census

=== 2020 census ===
As of the 2020 census, Claypool had a population of 1,395. The median age was 42.7 years. 23.2% of residents were under the age of 18 and 21.2% of residents were 65 years of age or older. For every 100 females there were 102.8 males, and for every 100 females age 18 and over there were 98.5 males age 18 and over.

93.1% of residents lived in urban areas, while 6.9% lived in rural areas.

There were 546 households in Claypool, of which 25.8% had children under the age of 18 living in them. Of all households, 35.0% were married-couple households, 26.4% were households with a male householder and no spouse or partner present, and 29.3% were households with a female householder and no spouse or partner present. About 33.2% of all households were made up of individuals and 17.5% had someone living alone who was 65 years of age or older.

There were 674 housing units, of which 19.0% were vacant. The homeowner vacancy rate was 0.7% and the rental vacancy rate was 11.1%.

Racial composition as of the 2020 census
Race	Number	Percent
White	906	64.9%
Black or African American	22	1.6%
American Indian and Alaska Native	45	3.2%
Asian	11	0.8%
Native Hawaiian and Other Pacific Islander	1	0.1%
Some other race	215	15.4%
Two or more races	195	14.0%
Hispanic or Latino (of any race)	600	43.0%

=== 2000 census ===
As of the 2000 census, there were 1,794 people, 683 households, and 486 families residing in the CDP. The population density was 1,479.1 inhabitants per square mile (571.1/km^{2}). There were 786 housing units at an average density of 648.0 per square mile (250.2/km^{2}). The racial makeup of the CDP was 78.5% White, 1.0% Black or African American, 1.6% Native American, 0.1% Asian, 15.8% from other races, and 3.1% from two or more races. 41.0% of the population were Hispanic or Latino of any race.

There were 683 households, out of which 29.9% had children under the age of 18 living with them, 55.5% were married couples living together, 11.3% had a female householder with no husband present, and 28.8% were non-families. 24.6% of all households were made up of individuals, and 13.2% had someone living alone who was 65 years of age or older. The average household size was 2.63 and the average family size was 3.14.

In the CDP, the population was spread out, with 27.8% under the age of 18, 7.3% from 18 to 24, 23.2% from 25 to 44, 25.9% from 45 to 64, and 15.7% who were 65 years of age or older. The median age was 39 years. For every 100 females, there were 93.3 males. For every 100 females age 18 and over, there were 89.6 males.

The median income for a household in the CDP was $34,196, and the median income for a family was $47,593. Males had a median income of $33,571 versus $23,661 for females. The per capita income for the CDP was $16,246. About 6.4% of families and 12.1% of the population were below the poverty line, including 16.4% of those under age 18 and 15.0% of those age 65 or over.

== Notable people ==
- Ed Pastor, Democratic member of the United States House of Representatives
