= East Verde Estates, Arizona =

CDP in Gila County, Arizona

- Census-designated place
- Location of East Verde Estates in Gila County, Arizona.

- Location within Arizona Location within the United States
- Coordinates: 34°17′54″N 111°21′52″W
- Country: United States
- State: Arizona
- County: Gila

Area
  - Total: 2.50 sq mi (6.48 km^{2})
  - Land: 2.50 sq mi (6.48 km^{2})
  - Water: 0 sq mi (0.00 km^{2})
- Elevation: 4,613 ft (1,406 m)

Population (2020)
  - Total: 151
  - Density: 60.3/sq mi (23.29/km^{2})
- Time zone: UTC-7 (Mountain (MST))
- ZIP code: 85541
- Area code: 928
- GNIS feature ID: 2582778

East Verde Estates is a census-designated place in Gila County in the U.S. state of Arizona. East Verde Estates is located approximately six miles north of the town of Payson, off Arizona State Route 87. The population as of the 2010 U.S. census was 170.

== Geography ==
East Verde Estates is located at 34.298272°N 111.364552°W.

According to the U.S. Census Bureau, the community has an area of 2.504 square miles (6.49 km^{2}), all land.

== Demographics ==
Historical population
Census	Pop.	Note	%±
2020	151		—
U.S. Decennial Census

== Education ==
It is in the Payson Unified School District. Payson High School is the zoned comprehensive high school.
