= Dripping Springs, Arizona =

CDP in Gila County, Arizona

- Census-designated place
- Location of Dripping Springs in Gila County, Arizona.

- Location within Arizona Location within the United States
- Coordinates: 33°06′18″N 110°45′18″W
- Country: United States
- State: Arizona
- County: Gila

Area
  - Total: 6.73 sq mi (17.43 km^{2})
  - Land: 6.73 sq mi (17.43 km^{2})
  - Water: 0 sq mi (0.00 km^{2})
- Elevation: 2,241 ft (683 m)

Population (2020)
  - Total: 142
  - Density: 21.1/sq mi (8.15/km^{2})
- Time zone: UTC-7 (Mountain (MST))
- ZIP code: 85192
- Area code: 928
- GNIS feature ID: 2582775

Dripping Springs is a census-designated place in Gila County in the U.S. state of Arizona. Dripping Springs is located approximately 14 miles north of the town of Hayden on Arizona State Route 77. The population as of the 2010 U.S. census was 235.

== Geography ==
Dripping Springs is located at 33.104954°N 110.755088°W.

According to the U.S. Census Bureau, the community has an area of 6.7 square miles (17 km^{2}), all land.

== Demographics ==
Historical population
Census	Pop.	Note	%±
2020	142		—
U.S. Decennial Census
