= East Globe, Arizona =

CDP in Gila County, Arizona

- Census-designated place
- Location of East Globe in Gila County, Arizona.

- Location within Arizona Location within the United States
- Coordinates: 33°21′04″N 110°42′19″W
- Country: United States
- State: Arizona
- County: Gila

Area
  - Total: 3.38 sq mi (8.75 km^{2})
  - Land: 3.38 sq mi (8.75 km^{2})
  - Water: 0 sq mi (0.00 km^{2})
- Elevation: 3,415 ft (1,041 m)

Population (2020)
  - Total: 259
  - Density: 76.7/sq mi (29.62/km^{2})
- Time zone: UTC-7 (Mountain (MST))
- ZIP code: 85542
- Area code: 928
- GNIS feature ID: 2582777

East Globe is a census-designated place in Gila County, Arizona, United States. As of the 2010 census it had a population of 226.

The racial and ethnic makeup of the population is 78.3% non-Hispanic Native Americans, 12.9% Hispanic Native Americans, 3.5% non-Hispanic whites, 0.4% Asian, 2.2% reporting two or more races and 2.6% non-Native American Hispanics.

== Geography ==
East Globe is located at 33.351210°N 110.705266°W.

According to the U.S. Census Bureau, the community has an area of 3.447 square miles (8.93 km^{2}), all land.

== Demographics ==
Historical population
Census	Pop.	Note	%±
2020	259		—
U.S. Decennial Census
