= White Mountain Lake, Arizona =

Unincorporated community in the state of Arizona, United States

- Unincorporated community and CDP
- Location of White Mountain Lake in Navajo County, Arizona.

- Location within Arizona Location within the United States
- Coordinates: 34°21′52″N 109°59′25″W
- Country: United States
- State: Arizona
- County: Navajo

Area
  - Total: 24.35 sq mi (63.06 km^{2})
  - Land: 24.04 sq mi (62.26 km^{2})
  - Water: 0.31 sq mi (0.80 km^{2})
- Elevation: 6,132 ft (1,869 m)

Population (2010)
  - Total: 2,205
- Time zone: UTC-7 (Mountain (MST))
- ZIP code: 85912
- Area code: 928
- GNIS feature ID: 2582903

White Mountain Lake is a private reservoir owned by the Silver Creek Irrigation District, and leased by the surrounding community for their private recreational use. The reservoir is located within White Mountain Lake Estates, an unincorporated community and census-designated place in Navajo County, Arizona, United States. Use of the reservoir is restricted to property owners within this special use district.

The community of White Mountain Lake is 7.5 miles (12.1 km) north-northeast of Show Low. White Mountain Lake has a post office with ZIP code 85912.

== Demographics ==
=== 2020 census ===
As of the 2020 census, White Mountain Lake had a population of 2,335. The median age was 52.1 years. 19.0% of residents were under the age of 18 and 29.2% of residents were 65 years of age or older. For every 100 females there were 103.9 males, and for every 100 females age 18 and over there were 104.1 males age 18 and over.

0.0% of residents lived in urban areas, while 100.0% lived in rural areas.

There were 988 households in White Mountain Lake, of which 22.8% had children under the age of 18 living in them. Of all households, 47.8% were married-couple households, 21.6% were households with a male householder and no spouse or partner present, and 23.1% were households with a female householder and no spouse or partner present. About 27.9% of all households were made up of individuals and 16.3% had someone living alone who was 65 years of age or older.

There were 1,832 housing units, of which 46.1% were vacant. The homeowner vacancy rate was 4.6% and the rental vacancy rate was 16.3%.

Racial composition as of the 2020 census
Race	Number	Percent
White	1,967	84.2%
Black or African American	10	0.4%
American Indian and Alaska Native	59	2.5%
Asian	10	0.4%
Native Hawaiian and Other Pacific Islander	1	0.0%
Some other race	103	4.4%
Two or more races	185	7.9%
Hispanic or Latino (of any race)	303	13.0%

=== 2010 census ===
As of the 2010 census, there were 2,205 people, 922 households, and 590 families living in the CDP.
