= Copper Hill, Arizona =

CDP in Gila County, Arizona

- Census-designated place
- Location of Copper Hill in Gila County, Arizona.

- Location within Arizona Location within the United States
- Coordinates: 33°25′49″N 110°45′52″W
- Country: United States
- State: Arizona
- County: Gila

Area
  - Total: 7.36 sq mi (19.05 km^{2})
  - Land: 7.36 sq mi (19.05 km^{2})
  - Water: 0 sq mi (0.00 km^{2})
- Elevation: 4,127 ft (1,258 m)

Population (2020)
  - Total: 158
  - Density: 21/sq mi (8.3/km^{2})
- Time zone: UTC-7 (Mountain (MST))
- ZIP code: 85501
- Area code: 928
- GNIS feature ID: 42763

Copper Hill is a census-designated place in Gila County, Arizona, United States. Copper Hill is located near US Route 60, northeast of the city of Globe. The population as of the 2010 U.S. census was 108.

== Geography ==
Copper Hill is located at 33.433316°N 110.748494°W.

According to the U.S. Census Bureau, the community has an area of 7.349 square miles (19.03 km^{2}), of which 7.348 square miles (19.03 km^{2}) is land, and 0.001 square miles (0.0026 km^{2}) is water.

== Demographics ==
Historical population
Census	Pop.	Note	%±
2010	108		—
2020	158		46.3%
U.S. Decennial Census
