= Wheatfields, Apache County, Arizona =

Wheatfields, Arizona
- Populated place
- Location within the state of Arizona Wheatfields (the United States)
- Coordinates: 36°14′16″N 109°07′43″W
- Country: United States
- State: Arizona
- County: Apache
- Elevation: 7,287 ft (2,221 m)
- Time zone: UTC-7 (Mountain (MST))
  - Summer (DST): UTC-7 (MST)
- Area code: 928
- FIPS code: 04-82110
- GNIS feature ID: 25274

Wheatfields is a populated place situated in Apache County, Arizona, United States, right along the border with New Mexico. It has an estimated elevation of 7,287 feet (2,221 m) above sea level. It is one of two places in Arizona with this name, the other being a CDP in Gila County. In 1909, the US Government set up an irrigation project to assist the Navajo residents. It is a chapter of the Navajo Nation.
