= Wellton Hills, Arizona =

CDP in Yuma County, Arizona

- Census-designated place
- Location of Wellton Hills in Yuma County, Arizona.

- Location within Arizona
- Coordinates: 32°37′23″N 114°08′43″W
- Country: United States
- State: Arizona
- County: Yuma

Area
  - Total: 0.64 sq mi (1.66 km^{2})
  - Land: 0.64 sq mi (1.66 km^{2})
  - Water: 0 sq mi (0.00 km^{2})
- Elevation: 364 ft (111 m)

Population (2020)
  - Total: 167
  - Density: 261.2/sq mi (100.84/km^{2})
- Time zone: UTC-7 (Mountain (MST))
- ZIP code: 85356
- Area code: 928
- GNIS feature ID: 2582898

Wellton Hills is a census-designated place in Yuma County, in the U.S. state of Arizona. The population was 258 at the 2010 census.

== Geography ==
According to the U.S. Census Bureau, the community has an area of 0.639 square miles (1.66 km^{2}), all land. Wellton Hills is located across from the Barry M. Goldwater Air Force Range. Wellton Hills terrain consists of the Sonoran Desert. This range is both used by the Department of Defense for training purposes and is a major hub for illegal immigration. In 2012, a new $22 million Border Patrol facility was opened.

== Demographics ==
Historical population
Census	Pop.	Note	%±
2010	258		—
2020	167		−35.3%
U.S. Decennial Census

== Education ==
It is in the Wellton Elementary School District and the Antelope Union High School District.
