= Deer Creek, Arizona =

CDP in Gila County, Arizona

- Census-designated place
- Location of Deer Creek in Gila County, Arizona.

- Location within Arizona Location within the United States
- Coordinates: 34°03′52″N 111°21′02″W
- Country: United States
- State: Arizona
- County: Gila

Area
  - Total: 1.83 sq mi (4.74 km^{2})
  - Land: 1.83 sq mi (4.74 km^{2})
  - Water: 0 sq mi (0.00 km^{2})
- Elevation: 3,025 ft (922 m)

Population (2020)
  - Total: 230
  - Density: 125.7/sq mi (48.55/km^{2})
- Time zone: UTC-7 (Mountain (MST))
- ZIP code: 85541
- Area code: 928
- GNIS feature ID: 2582770

Deer Creek is a census-designated place in Gila County in the U.S. state of Arizona. Deer Creek is located almost directly between the community of Tonto Basin and the town of Payson near Arizona State Route 87. The population as of the 2010 U.S. census was 216.

== Geography ==
Deer Creek is located at 34.062342°N 111.349481°W.

According to the U.S. Census Bureau, the community has an area of 1.744 square miles (4.52 km^{2}), all land.

There is an actual creek by the name of Deer Creek, which when not dry, flows by this Village of Deer Creek. The remains of David Gowan, a well-known pioneer, were buried just where they were found beside the North Fork of Deer Creek, close to Bars Canyon. . Today, the grave site is marked and preserved. (There is a different Deer Creek in the Grand Canyon which flows into the Colorado River.)

== Demographics ==
Historical population
Census	Pop.	Note	%±
2020	230		—
U.S. Decennial Census

== Education ==
It is in the Payson Unified School District. Payson High School is the zoned comprehensive high school.
