= El Capitan, Arizona =

CDP in Gila County, Arizona

- Census-designated place
- Location of El Capitan in Gila County, Arizona.

- Location within Arizona Location within the United States
- Coordinates: 33°14′18″N 110°47′00″W
- Country: United States
- State: Arizona
- County: Gila

Area
  - Total: 6.09 sq mi (15.78 km^{2})
  - Land: 6.09 sq mi (15.78 km^{2})
  - Water: 0 sq mi (0.00 km^{2})
- Elevation: 4,700 ft (1,400 m)

Population (2020)
  - Total: 48
  - Density: 7.9/sq mi (3.04/km^{2})
- Time zone: UTC-7 (Mountain (MST))
- ZIP code: 85192
- Area code: 928
- GNIS feature ID: 2582779

El Capitan is a census-designated place in Gila County in the U.S. state of Arizona. El Capitan is located approximately 13 miles (21 km) south of the city of Globe. The population as of the 2010 U.S. census was 37.

== Geography ==
El Capitan is located at 33.238343°N 110.783288°W.

According to the U.S. Census Bureau, the community has an area of 6.080 square miles (15.75 km^{2}), all land.

== Demographics ==
Historical population
Census	Pop.	Note	%±
2020	48		—
U.S. Decennial Census
