= Wheatfields, Gila County, Arizona =

CDP in Gila County, Arizona

Wheatfields, Arizona
- Census-designated place
- Location within Arizona Location within the United States
- Coordinates: 33°28′51″N 110°51′7″W
- Country: United States
- State: Arizona
- County: Gila

Area
  - Total: 8.06 sq mi (20.88 km^{2})
  - Land: 8.06 sq mi (20.88 km^{2})
  - Water: 0 sq mi (0.00 km^{2})
- Elevation: 3,121 ft (951 m)

Population (2020)
  - Total: 556
  - Density: 68.9/sq mi (26.62/km^{2})
- Time zone: UTC-7 (MST (no DST))
- Area code: 928
- FIPS code: 04-82120
- GNIS feature ID: 2582899

Wheatfields is a census-designated place (CDP) in Gila County, Arizona, United States. The population was 785 at the 2010 United States census. It is one of two places in Arizona with this name, the other being a populated place in Apache County.

== Geography ==
Wheatfields is located in southern Gila County in the valley of Pinal Creek. Arizona State Route 188 forms the western edge of the CDP, leading northwest 22 miles (35 km) to Theodore Roosevelt Lake and south 10 miles (16 km) to Globe, the county seat.

According to the United States Census Bureau, the Wheatfields CDP has a total area of 8.1 square miles (20.9 km^{2}), all land.

== Demographics ==
Historical population
Census	Pop.	Note	%±
2020	556		—
U.S. Decennial Census
