= Gila County, Arizona =

County in Arizona, United States

- County
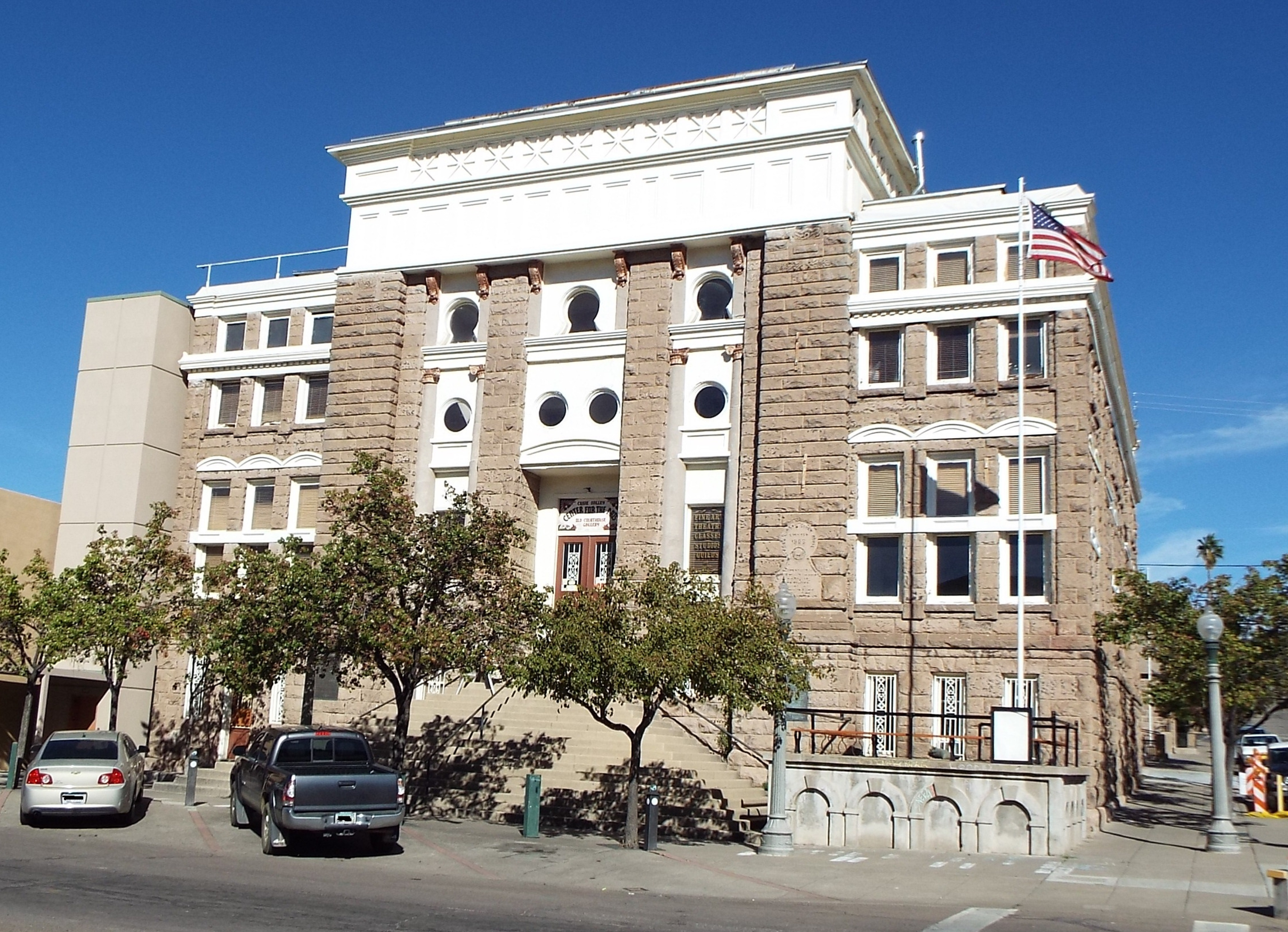
- Gila County Courthouse in Globe

- Flag Seal

- Location within the U.S. state of Arizona
- Coordinates: 33°47′28″N 110°50′11″W
- Country: United States
- State: Arizona
- Founded: February 8, 1881
- Named for: Gila River
- Seat: Globe
- Largest town: Payson

Area
  - Total: 4,795 sq mi (12,420 km^{2})
  - Land: 4,758 sq mi (12,320 km^{2})
  - Water: 38 sq mi (98 km^{2}) 0.8%

Population (2020)
  - Total: 53,272
  - Estimate (2025): 53,801 ▲
  - Density: 11.20/sq mi (4.323/km^{2})
- Time zone: UTC−7 (Mountain)
- Congressional district: 2nd
- Website: www.gilacountyaz.gov

Gila County (/ˈhiːlə/ HEE-lə) is a county in the central part of the U.S. state of Arizona. As of the 2020 census, the population was 53,272. The county seat is Globe.

Gila County comprises the Payson, Arizona micropolitan statistical area which is included in the greater Phoenix–Mesa, AZ combined statistical area.

Gila County contains parts of Fort Apache Indian Reservation and San Carlos Indian Reservation.

== History ==
The county was formed from parts of Maricopa and Pinal counties on February 8, 1881. The boundary was then extended eastward to the San Carlos River by public petition in 1889. The original county seat was in the mining community of Globe City, now Globe.

Popular theory holds that the word "Gila" was derived from a Spanish contraction of Hah-quah-sa-eel, a Yuma word meaning "running water which is salty".

In the 1880s, a long, range war broke out in Gila County resulting in an almost complete annihilation of the families involved. The Pleasant Valley War (also sometimes called the Tonto Basin Feud or Tonto Basin War) matched the cattle-herding Grahams against the sheep-herding Tewksburys. Once partisan feelings became tense and hostilities began, Frederick Russell Burnham, who later became a celebrated scout and the inspiration for the boy scouts, was drawn into the conflict on the losing side.

Burnham shot many men in the feud, and was himself nearly killed by a bounty hunter. Tom Horn, an infamous assassin, was known to have taken part as a killer for hire, but it is unknown which side employed him. Both sides suffered fatalities. No one was ever charged or prosecuted.

In the 1960s, it was home of Gerald Gault, who was the subject of the 1967 U.S. Supreme Court ruling, in re Gault, that stated juveniles have the same rights as adults when arrested: to be notified of the charges against them, their rights to attorneys, for family members to be notified of their arrests, to confront their accusers and to not be punished more harshly than adults who are convicted of the same crime, especially if an adult's penalty for the crime would be less than that accorded a juvenile convict.

== Geography ==
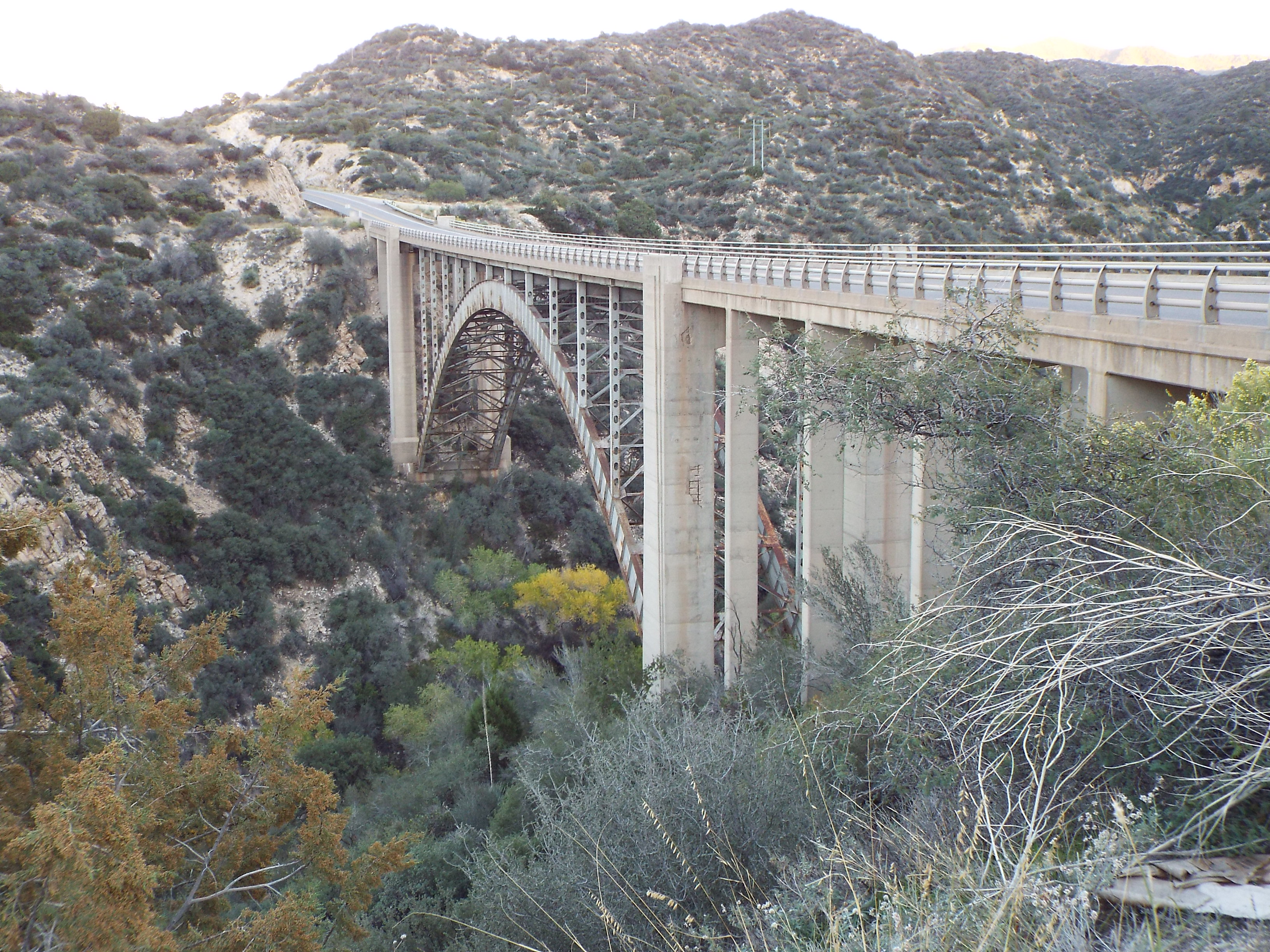
Pinto Creek Bridge on US 60

According to the United States Census Bureau, the county has a total area of 4,795 square miles (12,420 km^{2}), of which 4,758 square miles (12,320 km^{2}) is land and 38 square miles (98 km^{2}) (0.8%) is water.

=== Adjacent counties ===
- Yavapai County – northwest-north
- Maricopa County – west
- Pinal County – south
- Graham County – south
- Navajo County – east, northeast
- Coconino County – north

=== National protected areas ===
- Coconino National Forest (part)
- Tonto National Forest (part)
- Tonto National Monument

== Demographics ==
Historical population
| Census | Pop. | Note | %± |
|---|---|---|---|
| 1890 | 2,021 | | — |
| 1900 | 4,973 | | 146.1% |
| 1910 | 16,348 | | 228.7% |
| 1920 | 25,678 | | 57.1% |
| 1930 | 31,016 | | 20.8% |
| 1940 | 23,867 | | −23.0% |
| 1950 | 24,158 | | 1.2% |
| 1960 | 25,745 | | 6.6% |
| 1970 | 29,255 | | 13.6% |
| 1980 | 37,080 | | 26.7% |
| 1990 | 40,216 | | 8.5% |
| 2000 | 51,335 | | 27.6% |
| 2010 | 53,597 | | 4.4% |
| 2020 | 53,272 | | −0.6% |
| 2025 (est.) | 53,801 | ▲ | 1.0% |
U.S. Decennial Census; 1790–1960 1900–1990; 1990–2000 2010–2020

=== Racial and ethnic composition ===
Gila County, Arizona – Racial and ethnic composition Note: the US Census treats Hispanic/Latino as an ethnic category. This table excludes Latinos from the racial categories and assigns them to a separate category. Hispanics/Latinos may be of any race.
| Race / Ethnicity (NH = Non-Hispanic) | 2020 | 2010 | 2000 | 1990 | 1980 |
|---|---|---|---|---|---|
| White alone (NH) | 61.5% (32,757) | 65.9% (35,298) | 68.9% (35,391) | 68.1% (27,377) | 64.5% (23,926) |
| Black alone (NH) | 0.5% (239) | 0.4% (195) | 0.3% (174) | 0.2% (97) | 0.2% (81) |
| American Indian alone (NH) | 16.3% (8,655) | 14.2% (7,615) | 12.5% (6,412) | 12.7% (5,112) | 13.8% (5,132) |
| Asian alone (NH) | 0.8% (427) | 0.5% (256) | 0.4% (211) | 0.3% (109) | 0.3% (119) |
| Pacific Islander alone (NH) | 0.1% (45) | 0.1% (34) | 0.1% (24) | | |
| Other race alone (NH) | 0.4% (203) | 0.1% (38) | 0.1% (36) | 0.1% (35) | 0% (17) |
| Multiracial (NH) | 3.1% (1,663) | 1.1% (573) | 1.1% (541) | — | — |
| Hispanic/Latino (any race) | 17.4% (9,283) | 17.9% (9,588) | 16.7% (8,546) | 18.6% (7,486) | 21% (7,805) |

=== American Community Survey 2025 data ===
The United States Census Bureau estimated that in 2025, Gila County’s population was 53.801. It was also estimated that the county's population was 60,49% Non-Hispanic White, 18,87% Hispanic or Latino, 0,65% Non-Hispanic Black, 0,77% Asian, 16,56% Native American, 0,10% Pacific Islander, and 2,55% Multiracial.

| Total | Population | Percentage |
|---|---|---|
| Non-Hispanic White | 32.546 | 60,49% |
| Hispanic or Latino | 10.152 | 18,87% |
| Non-Hispanic Black | 349 | 0,65% |
| Asian | 416 | 0,77% |
| Native American | 8.909 | 16,56% |
| Pacific Islander | 55 | 0,10% |
| Non-Hispanic Multiracial | 1.374 | 2,55% |

=== 2020 census ===
As of the 2020 census, the county had a population of 53,272. Of the residents, 19.3% were under the age of 18 and 29.8% were 65 years of age or older; the median age was 51.7 years. For every 100 females there were 99.2 males, and for every 100 females age 18 and over there were 97.8 males. 55.6% of residents lived in urban areas while 44.4% lived in rural areas.

The racial makeup of the county was 67.4% White, 0.5% Black or African American, 16.8% American Indian and Alaska Native, 0.8% Asian, 0.1% Native Hawaiian and Pacific Islander, 5.8% from some other race, and 8.6% from two or more races. Hispanic or Latino residents of any race comprised 17.4% of the population.

The most reported ancestries in 2020 were:

- English (15.7%)
- Mexican (14.8%)
- German (12.9%)
- Irish (11.3%)
- San Carlos Apache (7%)
- Apache (3.6%)
- Italian (3.1%)
- White Mountain Apache (2.9%)
- Scottish (2.5%)
- French (2.1%)

There were 22,312 households in the county, of which 22.1% had children under the age of 18 living with them and 27.1% had a female householder with no spouse or partner present. About 31.4% of all households were made up of individuals and 18.1% had someone living alone who was 65 years of age or older.

There were 32,373 housing units, of which 31.1% were vacant. Among occupied housing units, 75.9% were owner-occupied and 24.1% were renter-occupied. The homeowner vacancy rate was 2.5% and the rental vacancy rate was 11.4%.

=== 2010 census ===
As of the census of 2010, there were 53,597 people, 22,000 households, and 14,294 families living in the county. The population density was 11.3 inhabitants per square mile (4.4 inhabitants/km^{2}). There were 32,698 housing units at an average density of 6.9 units per square mile (2.7 units/km^{2}). The racial makeup of the county was 76.8% white, 14.8% American Indian, 0.5% Asian, 0.4% black or African American, 0.1% Pacific islander, 5.3% from other races, and 2.0% from two or more races. Those of Hispanic or Latino origin made up 17.9% of the population. In terms of ancestry, 17.4% were German, 13.3% were English, 11.4% were Irish, and 3.4% were American.

Of the 22,000 households, 25.3% had children under the age of 18 living with them, 48.6% were married couples living together, 11.1% had a female householder with no husband present, 35.0% were non-families, and 29.3% of all households were made up of individuals. The average household size was 2.39 and the average family size was 2.94. The median age was 47.9 years.

The median income for a household in the county was $37,580 and the median income for a family was $46,292. Males had a median income of $41,698 versus $30,023 for females. The per capita income for the county was $19,600. About 11.6% of families and 18.9% of the population were below the poverty line, including 27.4% of those under age 18 and 10.0% of those age 65 or over.

=== 2000 census ===
As of the census of 2000, there were 51,335 people, 20,140 households, and 14,098 families living in the county. The population density was 11 people per square mile (4.2 people/km^{2}). There were 28,189 housing units at an average density of 6 units per square mile (2.3 units/km^{2}). The racial makeup of the county was 77.8% White, 0.4% Black or African American, 12.9% Native American, 0.4% Asian, 0.2% Pacific Islander, 6.6% from other races, and 1.8% from two or more races. 16.7% of the population were Hispanic or Latino of any race. 9.8% reported speaking Spanish at home, while 6.3% speak Western Apache.

There were 20,140 households, out of which 26.3% had children under the age of 18 living with them, 55.1% were married couples living together, 10.8% had a female householder with no husband present, and 30.0% were non-families. 25.8% of all households were made up of individuals, and 12.3% had someone living alone who was 65 years of age or older. The average household size was 2.50 and the average family size was 2.99.

In the county, the population was spread out, with 25.1% under the age of 18, 6.4% from 18 to 24, 22.3% from 25 to 44, 26.4% from 45 to 64, and 19.8% who were 65 years of age or older. The median age was 42 years. For every 100 females there were 96.8 males. For every 100 females age 18 and over, there were 94.2 males.

The median income for a household in the county was $30,917, and the median income for a family was $36,593. Males had a median income of $31,579 versus $22,315 for females. The per capita income for the county was $16,315. About 12.6% of families and 17.4% of the population were below the poverty line, including 25.9% of those under age 18 and 7.9% of those age 65 or over.

== Politics ==
Historically, Gila County was a Democratic-leaning county in largely-Republican Arizona – for example, it voted for Adlai Stevenson II in 1952, Hubert Humphrey in 1968 and (very narrowly in a three-way contest) for John W. Davis in 1924. In much of the "dealignment" period from 1960 to 1980, when Arizona was the only state never carried by a Democrat, Gila was the second most-Democratic county in Arizona, behind massively unionized Greenlee. Only during very large Presidential landslides was Gila County carried by Republicans before 2000: indeed, apart from Ronald Reagan in 1980 and Richard Nixon in 1972, no Republican before 2000 ever carried the county by more than seven percentage points.

Since 2000, however, like Greenlee County, Gila County has trended heavily towards the Republican Party, with Hillary Clinton’s 2016 performance being the worst ever by a Democratic presidential nominee at the time. Moreover, Barack Obama did worse here in 2008 than John Kerry did in 2004, one of a few non-Ozark or non-Appalachian counties where this occurred (possibly due to Arizona Senator John McCain's presence on the ballot).

Gila County was covered in the papers as the site of a confluence between politics and public health as the conservatism of the county (with Democrat Joe Biden losing by 34 points in the 2020 presidential election)

The county was one of two in Arizona to vote against 2024 Arizona Proposition 139, which established a right to abortion in the state's constitution, along with neighboring Graham County.

United States presidential election results for Gila County, Arizona
| Year | Republican | | Democratic | | Third party(ies) | |
| Year | No. | % | No. | % | No. | % |
|---|---|---|---|---|---|---|
| 1912 | 210 | 10.27% | 779 | 38.09% | 1,056 | 51.64% |
| 1916 | 1,495 | 26.08% | 3,686 | 64.29% | 552 | 9.63% |
| 1920 | 3,311 | 53.36% | 2,894 | 46.64% | 0 | 0.00% |
| 1924 | 2,193 | 34.55% | 2,218 | 34.94% | 1,937 | 30.51% |
| 1928 | 3,436 | 50.60% | 3,341 | 49.20% | 13 | 0.19% |
| 1932 | 1,865 | 27.76% | 4,625 | 68.84% | 228 | 3.39% |
| 1936 | 1,526 | 23.23% | 4,859 | 73.98% | 183 | 2.79% |
| 1940 | 2,624 | 31.21% | 5,752 | 68.42% | 31 | 0.37% |
| 1944 | 2,260 | 31.80% | 4,818 | 67.79% | 29 | 0.41% |
| 1948 | 2,329 | 32.06% | 4,780 | 65.79% | 156 | 2.15% |
| 1952 | 3,770 | 43.34% | 4,928 | 56.66% | 0 | 0.00% |
| 1956 | 4,234 | 51.26% | 4,026 | 48.74% | 0 | 0.00% |
| 1960 | 3,806 | 41.99% | 5,251 | 57.93% | 8 | 0.09% |
| 1964 | 3,713 | 35.24% | 6,821 | 64.73% | 3 | 0.03% |
| 1968 | 3,610 | 37.19% | 4,831 | 49.77% | 1,265 | 13.03% |
| 1972 | 5,673 | 54.70% | 4,295 | 41.41% | 404 | 3.90% |
| 1976 | 5,136 | 42.94% | 6,440 | 53.84% | 386 | 3.23% |
| 1980 | 7,405 | 55.27% | 5,068 | 37.82% | 926 | 6.91% |
| 1984 | 8,543 | 56.02% | 6,509 | 42.68% | 197 | 1.29% |
| 1988 | 7,861 | 51.38% | 7,147 | 46.72% | 291 | 1.90% |
| 1992 | 5,781 | 31.29% | 7,571 | 40.97% | 5,126 | 27.74% |
| 1996 | 6,407 | 36.80% | 8,577 | 49.26% | 2,427 | 13.94% |
| 2000 | 9,158 | 51.64% | 7,700 | 43.41% | 878 | 4.95% |
| 2004 | 12,343 | 59.12% | 8,314 | 39.82% | 220 | 1.05% |
| 2008 | 14,095 | 62.88% | 7,884 | 35.17% | 438 | 1.95% |
| 2012 | 13,455 | 62.31% | 7,697 | 35.64% | 443 | 2.05% |
| 2016 | 14,182 | 62.99% | 7,003 | 31.10% | 1,330 | 5.91% |
| 2020 | 18,377 | 66.40% | 8,943 | 32.31% | 358 | 1.29% |
| 2024 | 18,901 | 68.36% | 8,504 | 30.76% | 243 | 0.88% |

== Transportation ==
=== Major highways ===
- U.S. Route 60
- U.S. Route 70
- State Route 73
- State Route 77
- State Route 87
- State Route 177
- State Route 188
- State Route 260
- State Route 288

=== Airports ===
The following public-use airports are located in the county:

- Payson Airport in Payson
- San Carlos Apache Airport near Globe

== Communities ==
Map of the incorporated and major unincorporated areas in Gila County. Also shown are borders for Indian reservations in the county.

=== Towns ===
- Globe (county seat)
- Hayden (partly in Pinal County)
- Miami
- Payson
- Star Valley
- Winkelman (partly in Pinal County)

=== Census-designated places ===
- Bear Flat
- Beaver Valley
- Canyon Day
- Carrizo
- Cedar Creek
- Central Heights-Midland City
- Christopher Creek
- Claypool
- Copper Hill
- Cutter
- Deer Creek
- Dripping Springs
- East Globe
- East Verde Estates
- El Capitan
- Flowing Springs
- Freedom Acres
- Geronimo Estates
- Gisela
- Haigler Creek
- Hunter Creek
- Icehouse Canyon
- Jakes Corner
- Kohls Ranch
- Mead Ranch
- Mesa del Caballo
- Oxbow Estates
- Peridot
- Pinal
- Pine
- Rock House
- Roosevelt
- Roosevelt Estates
- Round Valley
- Rye
- San Carlos
- Six Shooter Canyon
- Strawberry
- Tonto Basin
- Tonto Village
- Top-of-the-World
- Washington Park
- Wheatfields
- Whispering Pines
- Young

=== Other communities ===
- Inspiration
- Punkin Center

=== Ghost towns ===
- Bellevue
- McMillenville

=== Indian communities ===
- Fort Apache Indian Reservation
- San Carlos Apache Indian Reservation
- Tonto Apache

=== County population ranking ===
The population ranking of the following table is based on the 2010 census of Gila County.

† county seat

| Rank | City/Town/etc. | Population (2010 Census) | Municipal type | Incorporated |
|---|---|---|---|---|
| 1 | Payson | 15,301 | Town | |
| 2 | † Globe | 7,532 | City | 1875 (founded) |
| 3 | San Carlos | 4,038 | CDP | |
| 4 | Central Heights-Midland City | 2,534 | CDP | |
| 5 | Star Valley | 2,310 | Town | 2005 |
| 6 | Pine | 1,963 | CDP | |
| 7 | Miami | 1,837 | Town | |
| 8 | Claypool | 1,538 | CDP | |
| 9 | Tonto Basin | 1,424 | CDP | |
| 10 | Peridot | 1,350 | CDP | |
| 11 | Canyon Day | 1,209 | CDP | |
| 12 | Six Shooter Canyon | 1,019 | CDP | |
| 13 | Strawberry | 961 | CDP | |
| 14 | Wheatfields | 785 | CDP | |
| 15 | Mesa del Caballo | 765 | CDP | |
| 16 | Icehouse Canyon | 677 | CDP | |
| 17 | Young | 666 | CDP | |
| 18 | Hayden (partially in Pinal County) | 662 | Town | |
| 19 | Gisela | 570 | CDP | |
| 20 | Round Valley | 487 | CDP | |
| 21 | Pinal | 439 | CDP | |
| 22 | Winkelman (partially in Pinal County) | 353 | Town | |
| 23 | Cedar Creek | 318 | CDP | |
| 24 | Tonto Village | 256 | CDP | |
| 25 | Dripping Springs | 235 | CDP | |
| t-26 | Beaver Valley | 231 | CDP | |
| t-26 | Top-of-the-World | 231 | CDP | |
| 27 | East Globe | 226 | CDP | |
| 28 | Oxbow Estates | 217 | CDP | |
| 29 | Deer Creek | 216 | CDP | |
| 30 | East Verde Estates | 170 | CDP | |
| 31 | Christopher Creek | 156 | CDP | |
| 32 | Whispering Pines | 148 | CDP | |
| 33 | Carrizo | 127 | CDP | |
| 34 | Copper Hill | 108 | CDP | |
| 35 | Freedom Acres | 84 | CDP | |
| 36 | Rye | 77 | CDP | |
| 37 | Jakes Corner | 76 | CDP | |
| 38 | Cutter | 74 | CDP | |
| 39 | Washington Park | 70 | CDP | |
| 40 | Geronimo Estates | 60 | CDP | |
| 41 | Rock House | 50 | CDP | |
| 42 | Hunter Creek | 48 | CDP | |
| 43 | Kohls Ranch | 46 | CDP | |
| 44 | Flowing Springs | 42 | CDP | |
| 45 | Mead Ranch | 38 | CDP | |
| 46 | El Capitan | 37 | CDP | |
| 47 | Roosevelt | 28 | CDP | |
| 48 | Haigler Creek | 19 | CDP | |
| 49 | Bear Flat | 18 | CDP | |

== Education ==
School districts include:

Unified school districts:

- Globe Unified School District
- Hayden-Winkelman Unified School District
- Miami Unified School District
- Payson Unified School District
- San Carlos Unified School District
- Whiteriver Unified School District

Elementary school districts:

- Pine Strawberry Elementary School District
- Tonto Basin Elementary School District
- Young Elementary School District

== Notable people ==
- George W. P. Hunt
- David Gowan
- Rose Mofford

== See also ==
- National Register of Historic Places listings in Gila County, Arizona
- Needle's Eye Wilderness
