= Rock House, Arizona =

CDP in Gila County, Arizona

- Census-designated place
- Location within Arizona Location within the United States
- Coordinates: 33°37′58″N 110°56′16″W
- Country: United States
- State: Arizona
- County: Gila

Area
  - Total: 0.64 sq mi (1.66 km^{2})
  - Land: 0.61 sq mi (1.57 km^{2})
  - Water: 0.031 sq mi (0.08 km^{2})
- Elevation: 2,190 ft (670 m)

Population (2020)
  - Total: 10
  - Density: 16.4/sq mi (6.35/km^{2})
- Time zone: UTC-7 (MST (no DST))
- ZIP code: 85545
- Area code: 928
- FIPS code: 04-60770
- GNIS feature ID: 2582853

Rock House is a census-designated place (CDP) in Gila County, Arizona, United States. The population was 50 at the 2010 census.

== Geography ==
The CDP is located in west-central Gila County in the valley of the Salt River east (upstream) of Theodore Roosevelt Lake. Arizona State Route 288, the Globe–Young Highway, passes through the community, leading north 41 miles (66 km) through Tonto National Forest to Young, and south 6 miles (9.7 km) to Arizona State Route 188 at a point 18 miles (29 km) north of Globe, the Gila County seat. According to the United States Census Bureau, the Pinal CDP has a total area of 0.64 square miles (1.66 km^{2}), of which 0.61 square miles (1.57 km^{2}) is land and 0.03 square miles (0.08 km^{2}), or 4.99%, is water.

== Demographics ==
Historical population
Census	Pop.	Note	%±
2020	10		—
U.S. Decennial Census

== See also ==
- List of census-designated places in Arizona
