= Sunflower, Arizona =

Unincorporated community in the state of Arizona, United States

- Unincorporated community
- Location of Sunflower in Maricopa County, Arizona

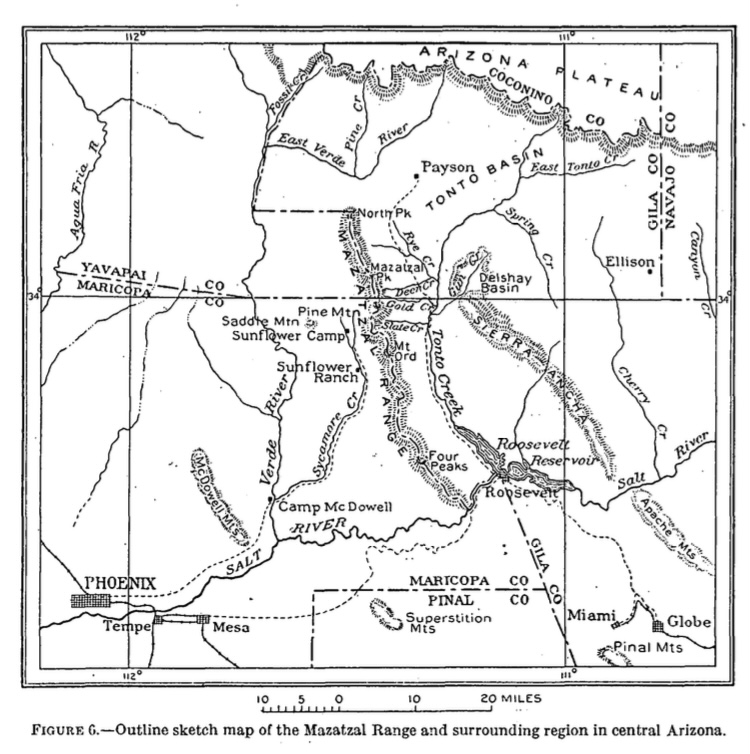
- USGS map of Sunflower Mining District (1915)
- Coordinates: 33°51′51″N 111°28′03″W
- Country: United States
- State: Arizona
- County: Maricopa
- Elevation: 3,405 ft (1,038 m)
- Time zone: UTC-7 (Mountain (MST))
- Area code: 480
- GNIS feature ID: 34951

Sunflower is a region of Maricopa County, Arizona, United States adjacent to the Mazatzal Wilderness, west of Tonto National Forest and northwest of Roosevelt Reservoir. Formerly a mercury-mining district, Sunflower is now a destination for hikers, campers and off-road vehicle tours. Sunflower is located near Arizona State Route 87, 22.8 miles (36.7 km) northeast of Fountain Hills. Route 87 near Sunflower is called the Beeline Highway.

== History ==
The place name derives from Sunflower Camp, Sunflower Cinnabar Mining Co. and Sunflower Mining District, all established after E. H. Bowman of Phoenix found quicksilver deposits in the area in October 1911 while prospecting for gold. These, in turn, draw their names from the pre-existing Sunflower ranch. The mercury deposits of the Mazatzal mountains—especially Sunflower, Pine Mountain and Rattlesnake mines—were the source of 95 percent of all mercury extracted from Arizona.

Circa 1915, visitors to the Tonto National Forest were advised that park rangers could be found at Sunflower. The location was a raw campsite until the 1930s, when Captain Harold Booth led Civilian Conservation Corp cohorts to the area. The Sunflower Ranch CCC camp was site F-25-A. Sunflower Ranger Station was built by the CCC in 1933 and was added to the National Register of Historic Places in 1993.

Prior to the establishment of the Sunflower post office in 1945, the post office location was sometimes called Diamond Ranch. Bushnell Tank near Sunflower was a watering stop built by the Forest Service and sheepmen along the Heber–Reno Sheep Driveway; the water in tank was piped in from a mountain spring and was located three days from the previous watering station.

The location saw flooding when the remnants of Tropical Storm Norma hit the area in 1970. This flood destroyed Sycamore Bridge between Sunflower and Payson, washing away a state highway patrol car and killing the patrolman.

The mine was abandoned in the 1980s but the site, accessible via the "often rough and boulder-strewn Sunflower Mine trail" remained an attraction for hikers. Circa 1987, Sunflower was to be a rest stop on the planned Trans-Arizona Trail but the Sunflower store had burned down so another provision site would have to be established. Sunflower is the junction point between sections 21 and 22 of the Arizona National Scenic Trail.

According to video evidence presented at trial, the Viper Militia practiced using explosives at Sunflower, reportedly eventually blowing up a bridge over the west fork of Sycamore Creek. In 1997, when the refining equipment necessary to extract mercury from cinnabar remained standing at the site above the Sycamore Creek, the Arizona Republic said the Sunflower trails offer "a look at the harshness of mining life and the ingenuity that was needed to erect mining facilities in rough terrain." Prior to road improvements in 1998, the road between the "hamlets" of Sunflower and Sycamore Creek was described as a "white-knuckle crapshoot [of] steep, twisting curves hugging the side of a mountain."

The community was evacuated in 2005 due to the threat of a nearby fire. In 2012, the Sunflower Fire burned 18,000 acres (28 mi^{2}; 73 km^{2}; 7,300 ha); the fire was started by an incendiary shotgun shell fired at a bachelor-party camping trip.
