= Sunflower Ranger Station =

- Sunflower Administrative Site
- U.S. National Register of Historic Places
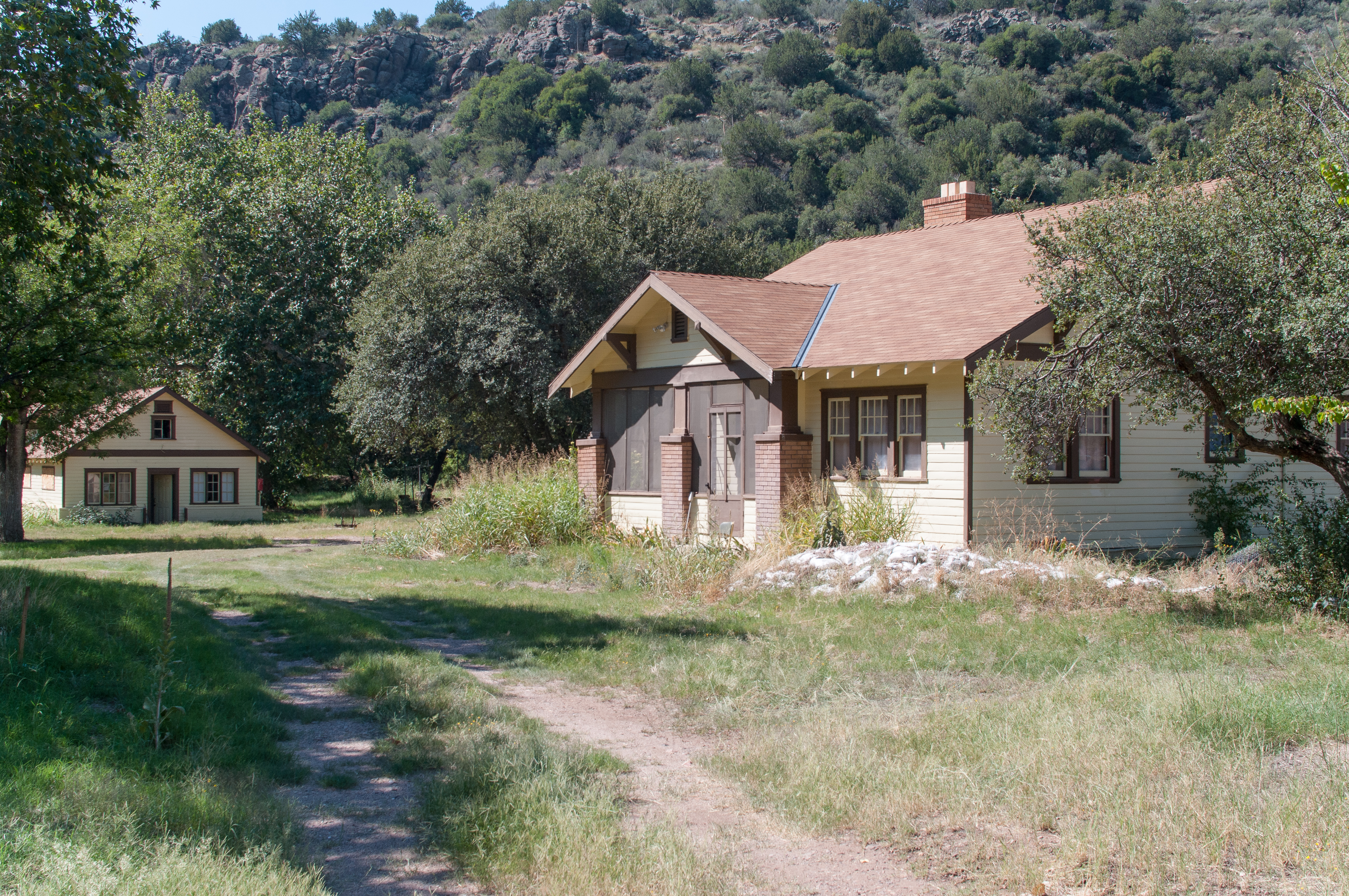
- Sunflower Ranger Station and contributing building

- Location within Arizona Location within the United States
- Nearest city: Punkin Center, Arizona
- Coordinates: 33.89373°N 111.48244°W
- Built: 1935
- Architect: USDA Forest Service
- Architectural style: Bungalow/Craftsman
- MPS: Depression-Era USDA Forest Service Administrative Complexes in Arizona MPS
- NRHP reference No.: 93000528
- Added to NRHP: June 10, 1993

The Sunflower Ranger Station, also known as Sunflower Administrative Site or Sycamore Ranger Station, in Tonto National Forest in the Sunflower district near Punkin Center, Arizona was built in 1935 by the Civilian Conservation Corps. It was listed on the National Register of Historic Places in 1993 for its architecture, which is Bungalow/Craftsman in style. It served historically as institutional housing and as government office space. The listing included two contributing buildings.

It is located at elevation of about 3,500 feet (1,100 m); surroundings rise to 7,200 feet (2,200 m). The station consists of six buildings (a residence/office, a barn/garage/shop, three sheds and a latrine) and a corral. The residence/office and the barn/garage/shop were built in 1935 and are the two contributing resources in the listing.
