= Grapevine Airstrip =

Airport in Gila County, Arizona

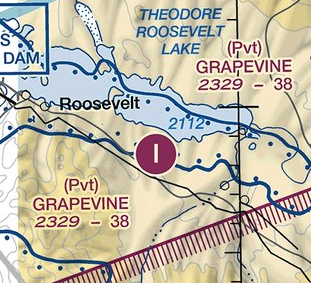
- IATA: none; ICAO: none; FAA LID: 88AZ

Summary
- Airport type: Charted as private
- Owner/Operator: United States Forest Service
- Location: Roosevelt, Arizona
- Elevation AMSL: 2,329 ft / 710 m
- Coordinates: 33°38′27.27″N 111°03′24.9″W
- Website: http://theraf.org/airport/88az

Map

Runways
Direction	Length		Surface
Direction	ft	m	Surface
17/35	3,800	1,158	Asphalt/concrete

Grapevine Airstrip (FAA LID: 88AZ) (formerly E75) is a non-towered general aviation recreational airstrip located on the Tonto Basin District of the Tonto National Forest, 43 mi (37 nmi; 69 km) east of Scottsdale, Arizona in Roosevelt, a town in Gila County, Arizona, United States. The airstrip sits .25 mi (400 m) from the shore of Lake Roosevelt, one of Arizona's largest bodies of water.

First constructed in the 1950s and paved in the 1980s, the airstrip was closed by the United States Forest Service (USFS) on June 27, 1997. Starting in 2012 with approval of the USFS, volunteers from the Recreational Aviation Foundation and Arizona Pilots Association donated hundreds of volunteer hours over five years to bring Grapevine Airstrip to an operational status. It reopened on February 10, 2017.

Grapevine was officially charted as a private airport by agreement with the USFS, to ensure that no touch-and-go landings, training, or commercial operations are conducted at the airstrip. However, it is open to the public, and the Arizona Pilots Association holds regular fly-ins to the airstrip.

== Facilities ==
Grapevine Airstrip is at an elevation of 2,329 ft (710 m) above mean sea level. It has one asphalt concrete–paved runway:

- 17/35 measuring 3,800 ft × 40 ft (1,158 m × 12 m)

== See also ==
- List of airports in Arizona
- Recreational Aviation Foundation
