= Jakes Corner =

Jakes Corner or Jake's Corner may refer to:

== Places ==
- Jakes Corner, Yukon, Canada
- Jakes Corner, Arizona, United States

== Other uses ==
- Jake's Corner (film)
