= Young Public School (Arizona) =

School in Gila County, Arizona, United States

Coordinates: 34.100687°N 110.965366°W

Young High School

Location
- Hwy 288 at Baker Ranch Rd; Young, Arizona 85554; United States

Information
- School type: Public school
- School district: Young Elementary School District
- Superintendent: Linda Cheney
- CEEB code: 030561
- Grades: K-12
- Colors: Red and black
- Mascot: Panthers
- Website: www.youngschool.org

In Arizona, the Young Public School is the K-12 public school in the town of Young.
