= Young Elementary School District =

School district in Arizona, United States

Address
- Highway 288 and Baker Ranch Road Young, Arizona, 85554; United States

District information
- Type: Public
- Grades: PreK–12
- NCES District ID: 0409540

Students and staff
- Students: 47
- Teachers: 5.5
- Staff: 9.24
- Student–teacher ratio: 8.55

Other information
- Website: www.youngschool.org

Young Public School District 5 is a school district in Gila County, Arizona serving the community of Young, Arizona. It operates only one school, Young Public School, which comprises grades K though 8.

In 1984 the district included sections of the Fort Apache Indian Reservation. In 1984 the Young district contracted with Whiteriver Unified School District to educate the Fort Apache students, numbering about 200, due to roads being inaccessible between Fort Apache and Young. As of 2020 these parts of the reservation are now directly in Whiteriver USD.
