= Theodore Roosevelt Dam =

Dam in Gila and Maricopa Counties, Arizona

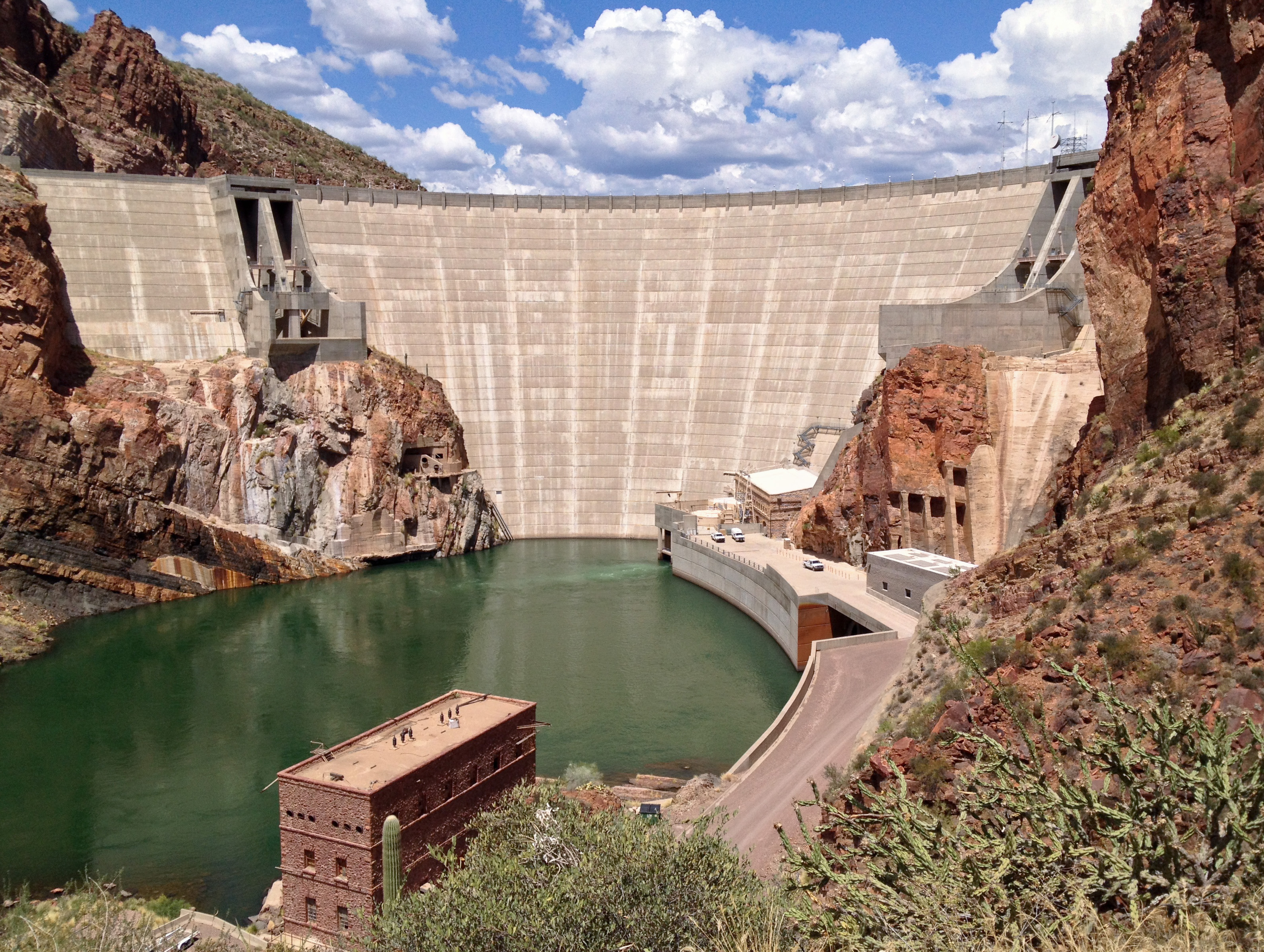
- Roosevelt Dam in 2015
- Interactive map of Theodore Roosevelt Dam
- Country: United States
- Location: Gila County / Maricopa County, Arizona
- Coordinates: 33°40′18″N 111°09′40″W
- Status: Operational
- Construction began: 1903
- Opening date: 1911
- Owner: Bureau of Reclamation
- Operator: Salt River Project

Dam and spillways
- Type of dam: Arch-gravity dam
- Impounds: Salt River, Tonto Creek
- Height: 357 ft (109 m)
- Length: 1,210 ft (369 m)
- Width (crest): 21.6 ft (6.6 m)
- Width (base): 196 ft (60 m)
- Dam volume: 606,000 yd^{3} (463,000 m^{3})
- Spillway capacity: 150,000 cu ft/s (4,200 m^{3}/s)

Reservoir
- Creates: Theodore Roosevelt Lake
- Total capacity: 1,653,043 acre⋅ft (2.039×10^{9} m^{3}) (conservation); 2,910,200 acre⋅ft (3.590×10^{9} m^{3}) (flood control)
- Catchment area: 5,830 sq mi (15,100 km^{2})
- Surface area: 21,493 acres (86.98 km^{2}) (conservation)

Power Station
- Operator: Salt River Project
- Hydraulic head: 249 ft (76 m)
- Installed capacity: 36 MW (48,000 hp)

U.S. National Historic Landmark
- Designated: 1963
- Delisted: 1999

Theodore Roosevelt Dam is a dam on the Salt River located northeast of Phoenix, Arizona. The dam is 357 feet (109 m) high and forms Theodore Roosevelt Lake as it impounds the Salt River. Built between 1905 and 1911, the dam was renovated and expanded in 1989–1996. The dam is named after President Theodore Roosevelt. Serving mainly for irrigation, water supply, and flood control, the dam also has a hydroelectric generating capacity of 36 megawatts.

== History ==
In 1888, Billy Breakenridge became surveyor for Maricopa County. He surveyed the Salt River for potential dam sites, and in July 1889 he, James McClintock, William J. Murphy, and John R. Norton set off on horseback to select one. A week in they reached Box Canyon, near the confluence of Tonto Creek and the Salt River and made their choice. However, they lacked the funding to proceed.

The Newlands Reclamation Act of 1902 created the United States Reclamation Service, whose purpose was to design and construct irrigation projects to aid the settlement of the arid west. Previous efforts by individuals and private irrigation companies were inadequate and often unsuccessful. With the creation of the Reclamation Service, the lead role of the federal government in developing large-scale irrigation projects was firmly established.

What was to become Roosevelt Dam was one of the original five federal projects authorized on March 14, 1903, under the Act, and the first major project to be completed.

Construction on Roosevelt Dam began in 1903. The primary purpose of the project was to provide water storage for the Salt River Project and flood control through the Salt River Valley. In 1906 Congress initiated federal production of electric power by authorizing the Reclamation Service to develop and sell hydroelectric power at the Salt River Project. The dam was finished in 1911 after several devastating floods had interrupted the construction progress in 1905. Completed at a cost of $10 million, it was the largest masonry dam in the world for its time, and one of the tallest, surpassing the 135-foot Lake Hemet Dam with a height of 280 feet (84 m) and a length of 723 feet (216 m), while 1,600,000 acre-feet (2.0 km^{3}) Roosevelt Lake was for a time the world's largest artificial reservoir. The dam was opened by former president Theodore Roosevelt on March 18, 1911.

Roosevelt Dam, as originally conceived and built, was a symbol of success and a showpiece for the new Reclamation agency. The dam contributed more than any other dam in Arizona to the settlement of Central Arizona and to the development of large-scale irrigation there.

The dam was listed as a National Historic Landmark in 1963 but was withdrawn from the list in 1999.

== Later expansion ==
In 1989, an ambitious expansion and renovation project was begun at Roosevelt Dam. The dam was resurfaced with concrete by J.A. Jones Construction Company, and its height was raised 77 feet (23 m) to 357 feet (109 m), which had the effect of increasing the storage capacity of Roosevelt Lake by roughly 20%. This project, which included three other major construction contracts associated with the dam, was completed in 1996 at a cost of $430 million. These included the realignment of Highway 188 over the new Theodore Roosevelt Lake Bridge upstream of the dam, renovations to the hydroelectric power plant, and a tunneling contract known as the "Lake Tap" for locating penstocks to bring water into the plant's electric turbines. Shortly after completion, however, the area entered into a prolonged period of drought, and it would be some time before the newly increased capacity was put to use, with the lake finally reaching historic levels of 100% capacity in February 2009.

As a result of the reconstruction, the dam has a completely altered appearance from when it was originally listed as a National Historic Landmark. The original rubble-masonry dam was completely encased in concrete, and the structural height was extended from 280 feet (85 m) to 357 feet (109 m). Since the dam no longer had the integrity of the design, materials, workmanship, feeling, or association that it had when it was originally listed, the National Historic Landmark designation was withdrawn on March 10, 1999. The Theodore Roosevelt Dam National Register District contains other resources that are listed on the National Register of Historic Places, but the dam itself is no longer a contributing property to the district.

== Gallery ==
Theodore Roosevelt speaking at the dedication ceremony in 1911. Photo by Walter Lubken.

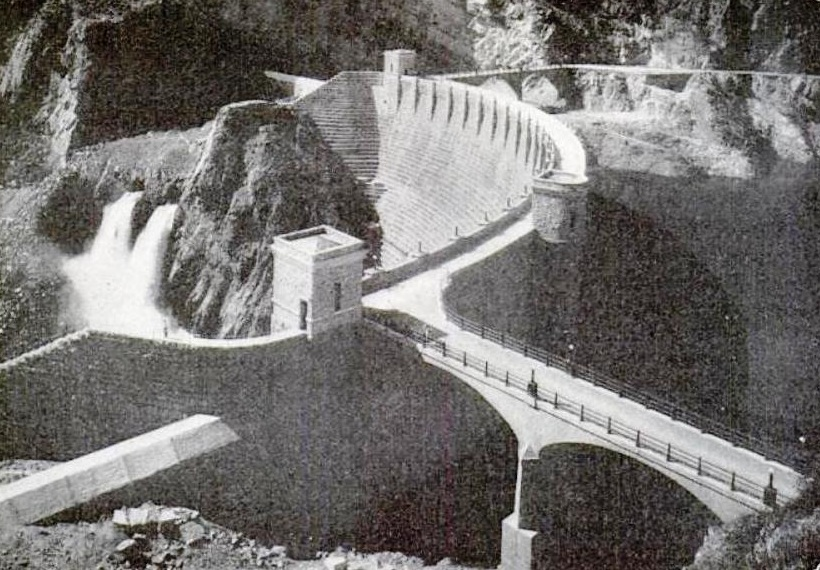
Roosevelt Dam shortly after completion in 1911

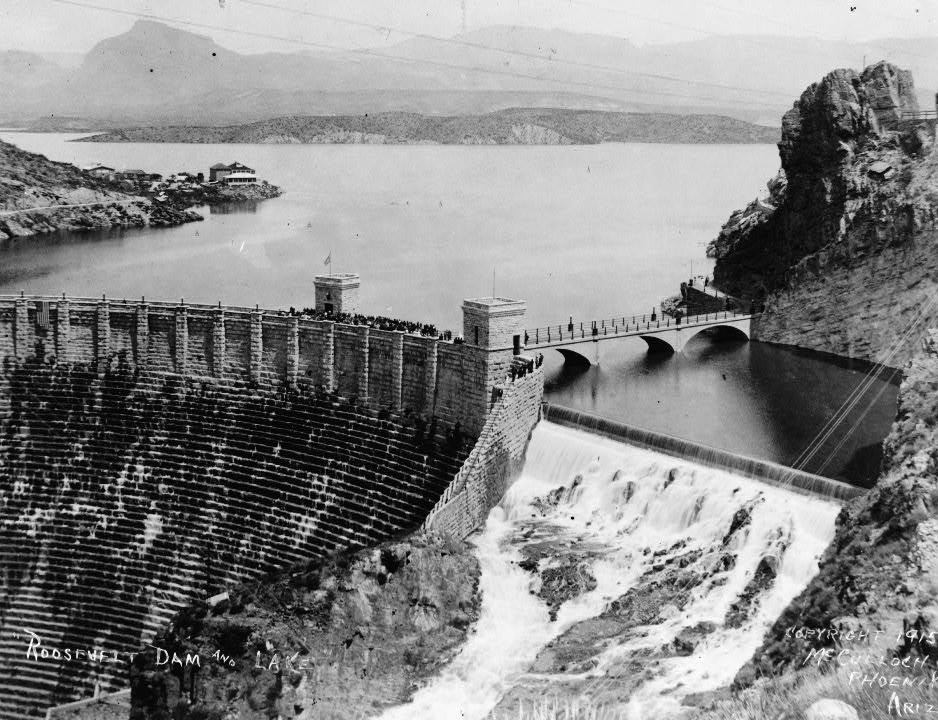
Roosevelt Dam in 1915 spilling from filled reservoir

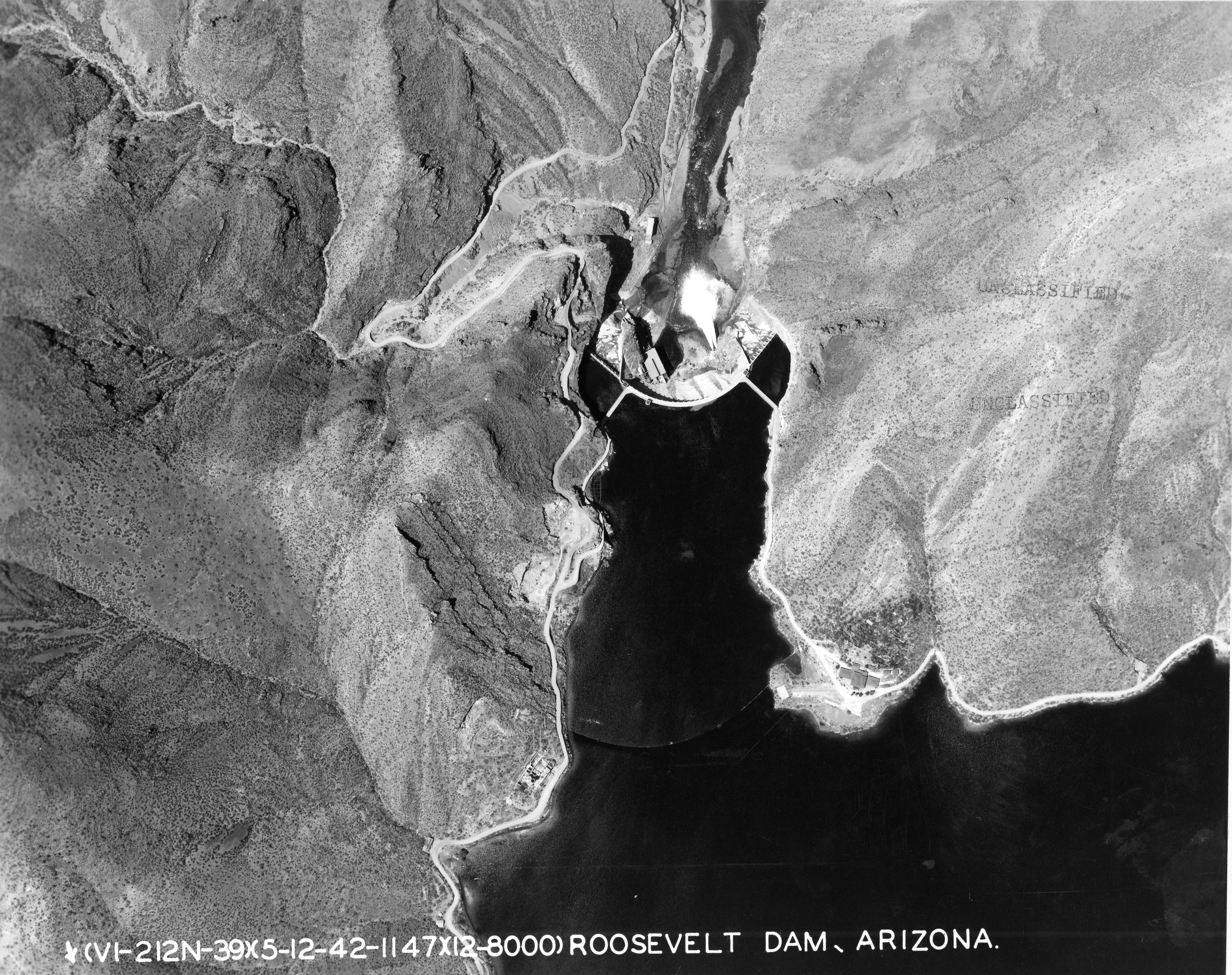
Roosevelt Dam in the 1940s

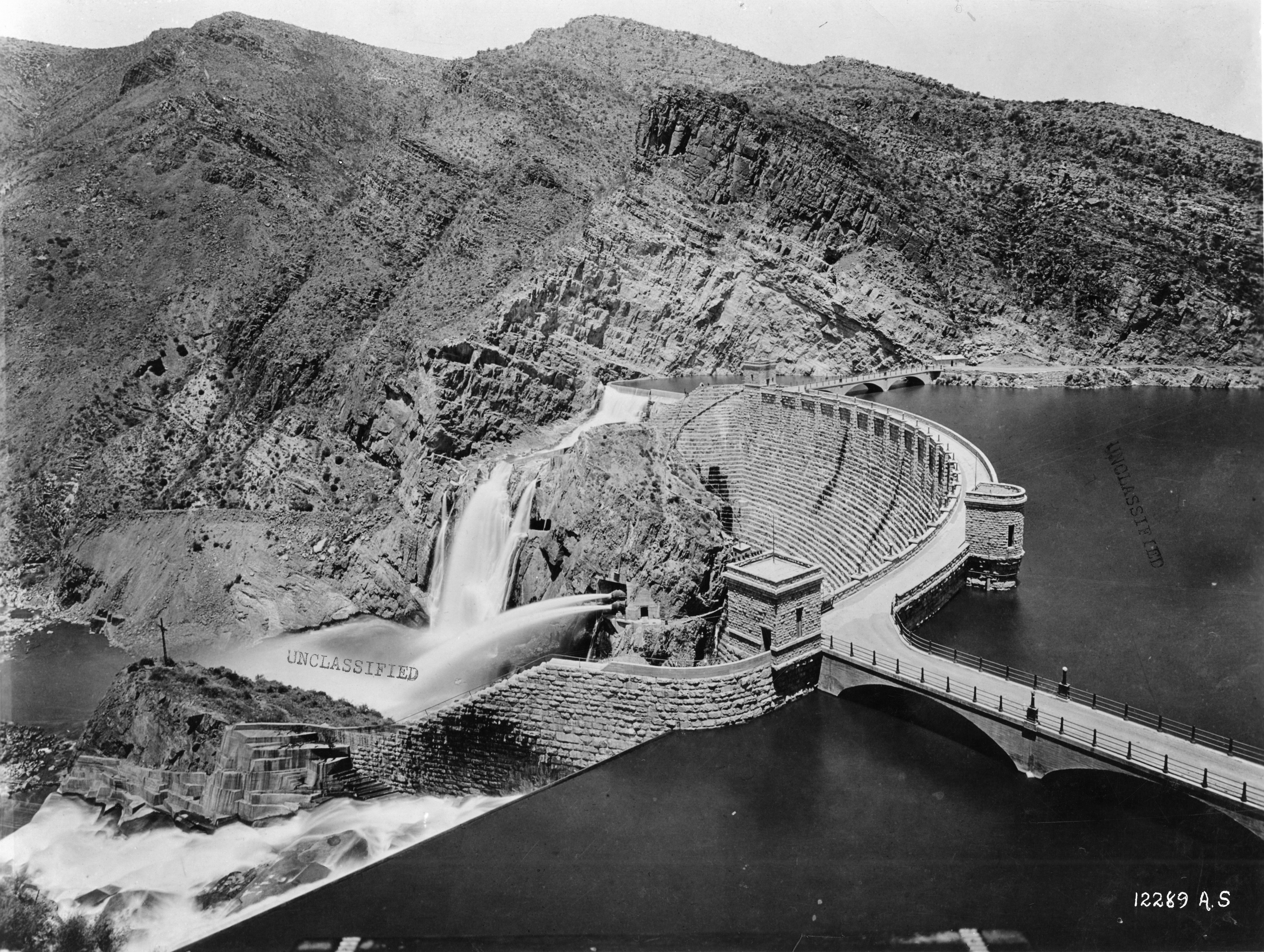
Roosevelt Dam in the 1940s

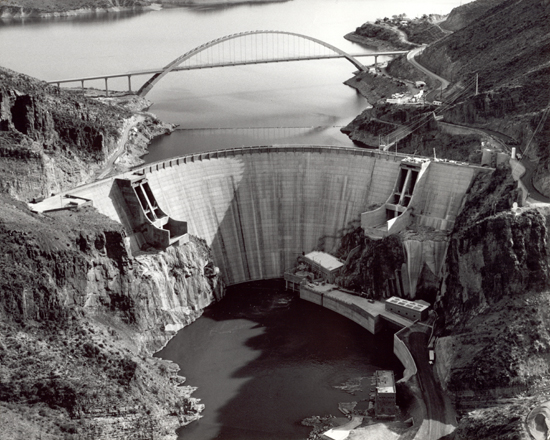
Enlarged, renovated Roosevelt Dam in 1996

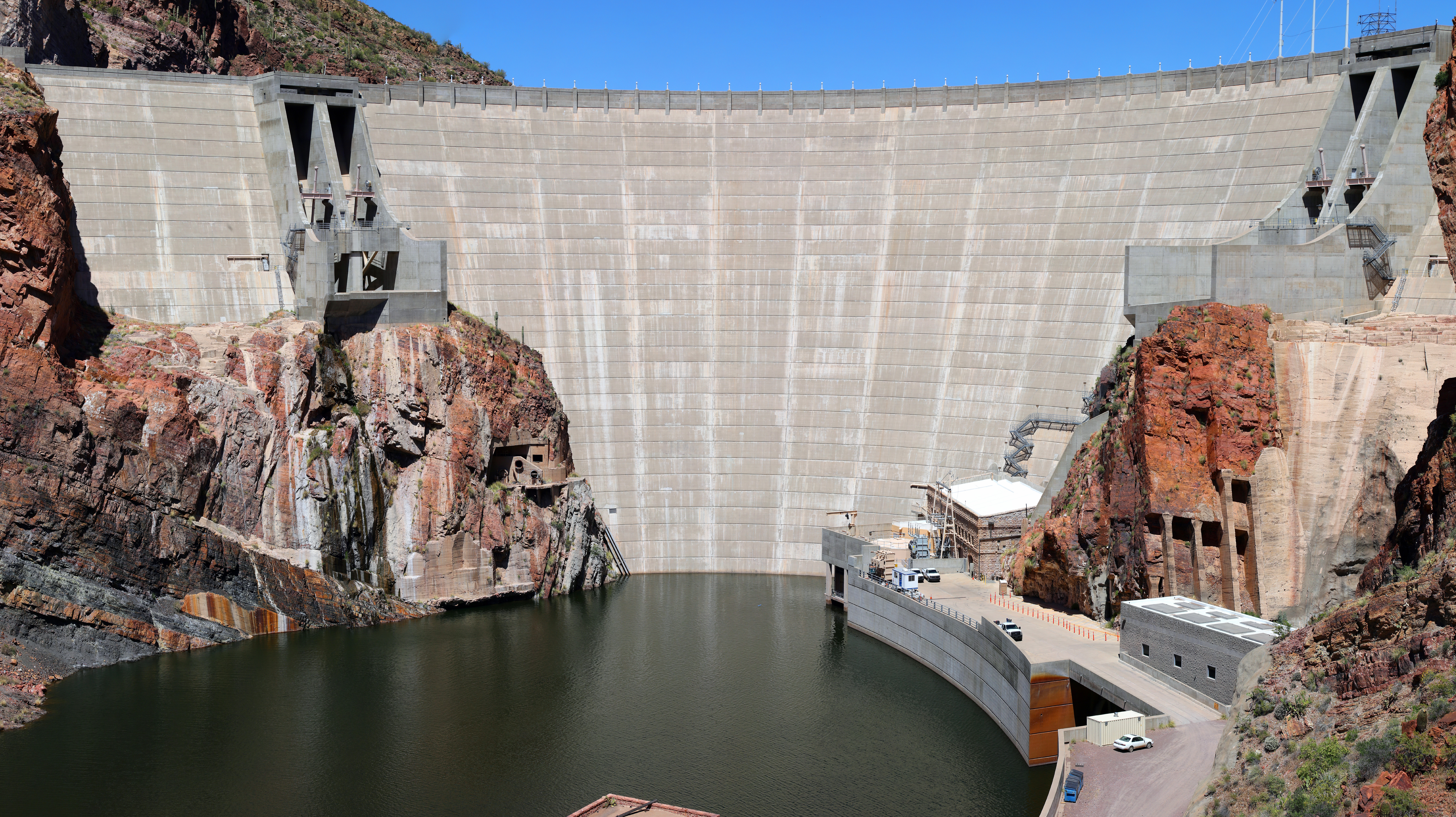
The dam after expansion and renovation
