= Arizona State Route 288 =

State highway in Arizona, United States

State Route 288
- Desert to Tall Pines Scenic Road

Route information
- Maintained by ADOT
- Length: 52.56 mi (84.59 km)
- Existed: 1960–present
- Tourist routes: Desert Tall Pines Scenic Road

Major junctions
- South end: SR 188 near Theodore Roosevelt Lake
- North end: Chamberlain Trail in Young

Location
- Country: United States
- State: Arizona

Highway system
- Arizona State Highway System; Interstate; US; State; Scenic Proposed; Former
← SR 287	→ SR 289

State Route 288 heads north from State Route 188 near Roosevelt Lake. SR 288 ends at Young south of State Route 260. Currently, most of SR 288 is unpaved.

== Route description ==
The southern terminus of SR 288 is located on SR 188 southeast of Theodore Roosevelt Lake. The highway heads north from this intersection through mountainous terrain as it heads towards Young. It passes through the community of Rock House. Portions of the highway are not paved and it does not intersect any other state highways other than SR 188 at its southern terminus. The northern terminus is located at an intersection with Chamberlain Trail in Young. The roadway continues on as a National Forest road.

== History ==
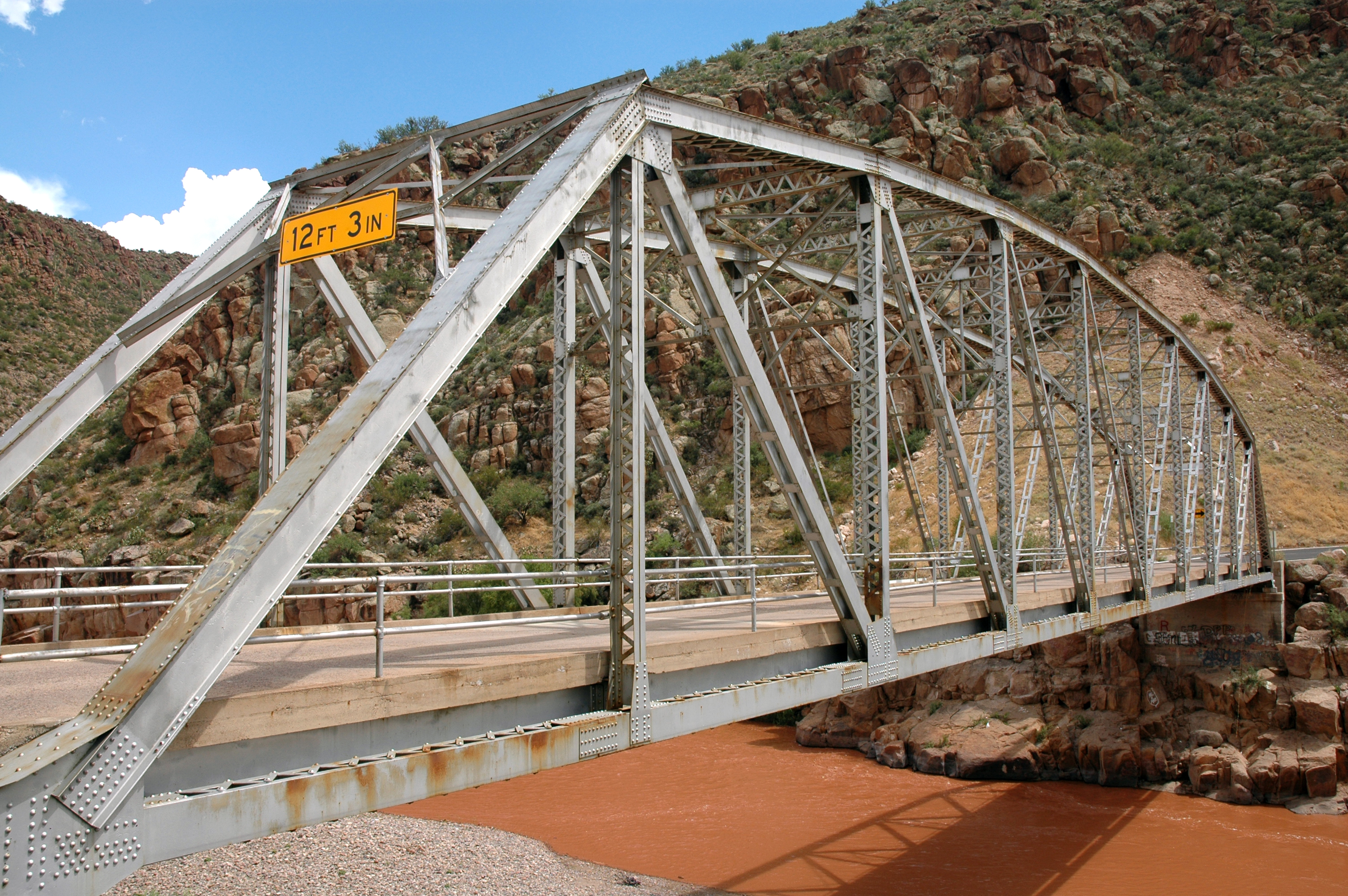
The 220 ft., single-lane bridge over the Salt River near the head of Theodore Roosevelt Lake was completed in 1920.

The route was established in 1959 as a state route. The highway received scenic road designation in 2001.

== Junction list ==
The entire route is in Gila County.

Location	mi	km	Destinations	Notes
	0.00	0.00	SR 188 (Apache Trail) – Roosevelt, Globe	Southern terminus; former SR 88
Young	52.56	84.59	Chamberlain Trail	Northern terminus; Desert to Tall Pines Scenic Road continues as Forest Service Road 512 (Young Road)
1.000 mi = 1.609 km; 1.000 km = 0.621 mi
