= Punkin Center, Arizona =

Community in Gila County, Arizona

Coordinates: 33°52′20″N 111°18′47″W

Punkin Center is an unincorporated community in Gila County, Arizona, United States. The community is located within the Tonto Basin at the confluence of Reno and Tonto creeks. Payson is 29 miles to the north along Arizona Route 188 and Arizona Route 87. Roosevelt Lake is eight miles to the south on Route 188.

On September 11, 2019, fugitives Blane and Susan Barksdale, who had escaped from a prisoner transport van the prior month, were captured by U.S. Marshals at a home in Punkin Center.
