= Shoofly Village Ruin =

Archaeological site, Tonto National Forest, Arizona

Coordinates: 34.291°N 111.282°W

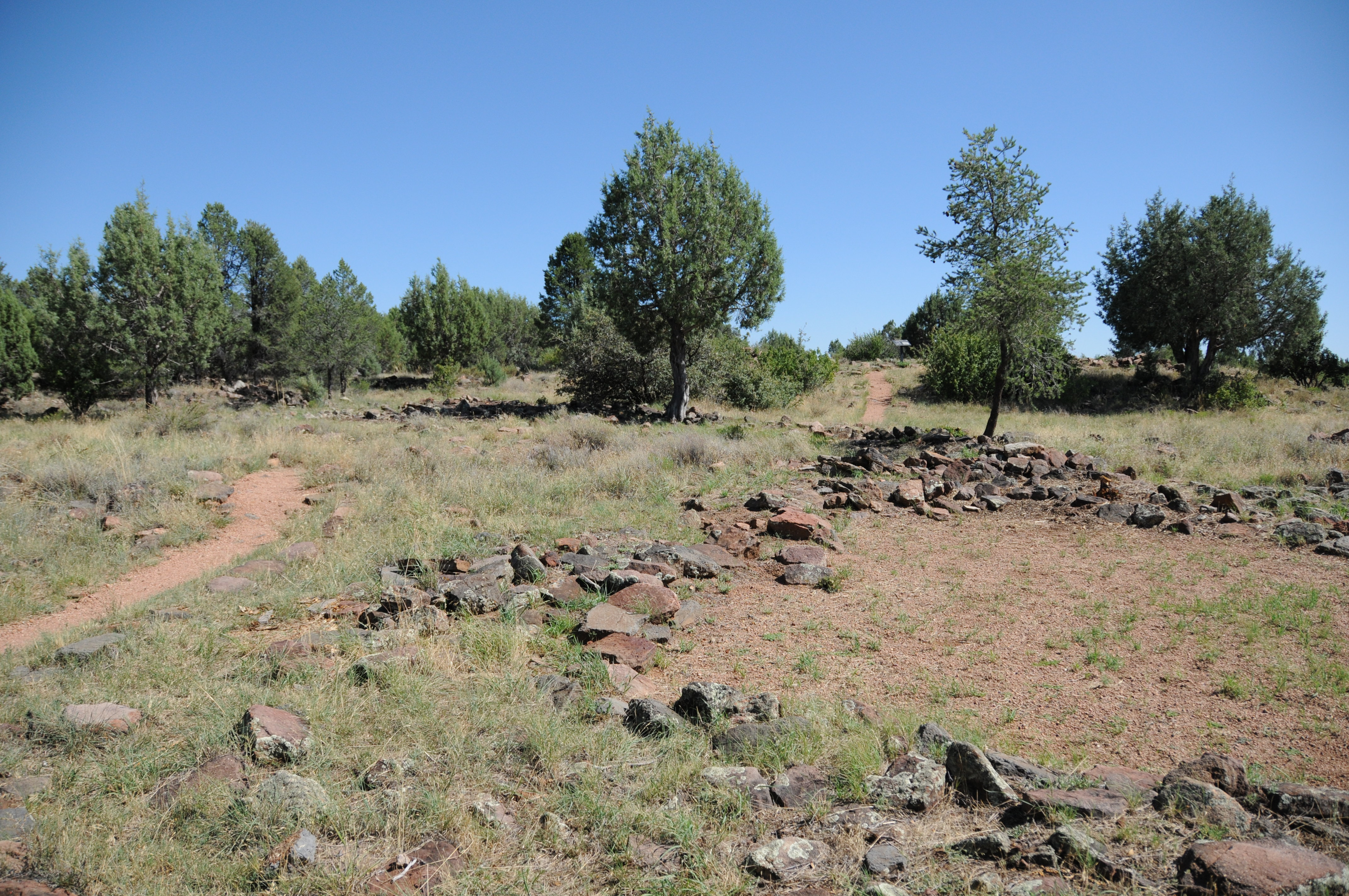
Shoofly Village Ruin, Tonto National Forest, Arizona

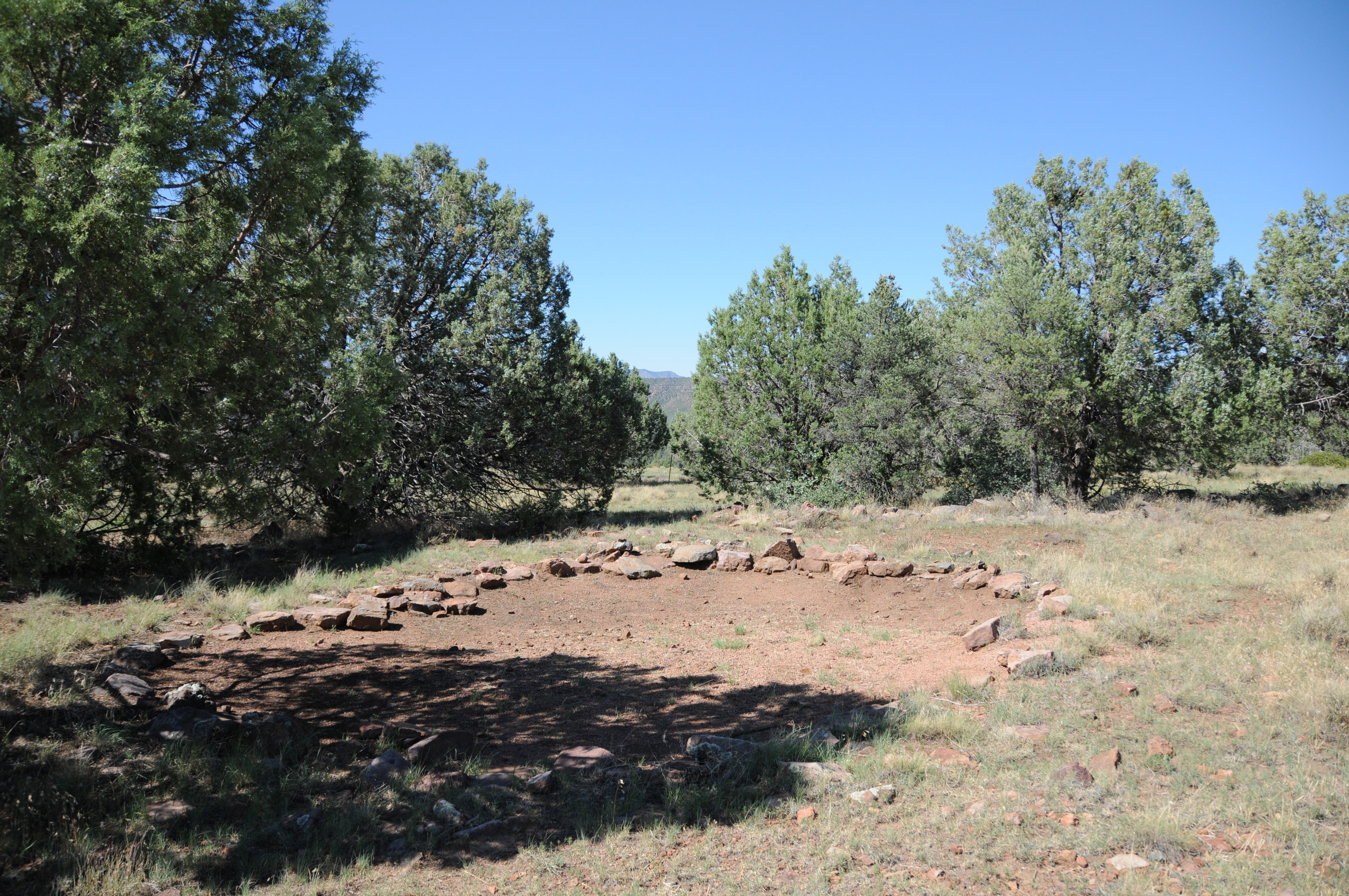
Shoofly's First Houses Site

The Shoofly Village Ruin is an archaeological site located in the Tonto National Forest near Payson, Arizona.

In the 1980s Arizona State University (ASU) began the Payson Archaeological Research Expedition (PARE), a long-term research program that combined cultural resource management with an archaeological field school program. In cooperation with the Tonto National Forest, ASU personnel selected the Shoofly Village Ruins as the locale for the field school that began in 1984 and continued through four seasons. ASU personnel also conducted archaeological investigations in conjunction with a Tonto National Forest land exchange project. The goals of the research program were to define settlement patterns in the Payson region, in particular the relationship between the Shoofly Village and others, smaller with two to three structures, often three walled; rock-ringed roasting pits; and agricultural fields.

The Shoofly Village was built around 1000 CE, beginning a time of growth, development, and population aggregation. Occupation appears to have ended around 1300 CE.

A book by Charles L. Redman, People of the Tonto Rim: Archaeological Discovery in Prehistoric Arizona is a record of ASU's research on Shoofly Village. Redman presents a settlement model that defines household communities (small sites occupied by single households), hamlets, and primary villages. Four primary villages, of which Shoofly Village is the largest, are known to be present in the area. The primary villages are evenly spaced across the landscape within relatively large production zones. Shoofly occupies the northernmost position, a vantage that permitted special access to the resources directly below the Mogollon Rim and proximity to the route up and over the rim. Redman suggested that the spatial layout and architectural variability of the site indicates that it was a conglomeration of discrete units, each resembling individual hamlet sites. He proposes that formerly separate social groups, each with its own distinctive building traditions, joined to form the Shoofly Village. The village was built in four phases, with the "core" room block of contiguous masonry rooms constructed later than the surrounding compounds of low-walled, cobble-jacal masonry structures. This suggests that the architectural differences on which Redman focuses may be temporal as well as ethnic in origin, although the other primary villages in the area have a similar layout and presumably also building history.
