= Jake's Corner (film) =

- Directed by: Jeff Santo
- Written by: Jeff Santo
- Produced by: Tim Comstock; Kevin Alexander Heard; Jeff Santo
- Starring: Richard Tyson; Diane Ladd; Danny Trejo; B. J. Thomas
- Cinematography: Paul Sanchez
- Edited by: John Bryant
- Music by: Steve Dorff
- Production company: Jake's Corner
- Distributed by: Monterey Video
- Release date: February 29, 2008 (Sedona)
- Running time: 98 minutes
- Country: United States
- Language: English

Jake's Corner is a 2008 American independent drama film starring Richard Tyson and Danny Trejo. The title of the film refers to the census-designated place of the same name.

== Cast ==
- Colton Rodgers as Spence
- Richard Tyson as Johnny Dunn
- Diane Ladd as Fran
- Danny Trejo as Clint
- B. J. Thomas as "Doc"

== Production ==
The film was shot in three weeks in Jakes Corner, Arizona.

== Reception ==
Laurie Jayne Frost of White Mountain Independent gave the film a positive review and wrote, "go see this movie." Randy Cordova of The Arizona Republic gave the film a negative review and wrote: "The lunkheaded logic isn't made any more palatable by the script, in which all of Dunn's pals are given silly quirks and blah back stories."
