= Jakes Corner, Arizona =

CDP in Gila County, Arizona

- Census-designated place
- Location within Arizona Location within the United States
- Coordinates: 34°00′38″N 111°19′13″W
- Country: United States
- State: Arizona
- County: Gila

Area
  - Total: 1.42 sq mi (3.68 km^{2})
  - Land: 1.42 sq mi (3.68 km^{2})
  - Water: 0 sq mi (0.00 km^{2})
- Elevation: 2,800 ft (850 m)

Population (2020)
  - Total: 98
  - Density: 69.0/sq mi (26.65/km^{2})
- Time zone: UTC-7 (MST (no DST))
- ZIP code: 85541
- Area code: 928
- FIPS code: 04-36010
- GNIS feature ID: 2582802

Jakes Corner is a census-designated place (CDP) in Gila County, Arizona, United States. The population was 76 at the 2010 census.

== Geography ==
The CDP is located in northwestern Gila County, in the valley of Hardt Creek, a tributary of Tonto Creek. Arizona State Route 188 passes through the community, leading northwest 3 miles (5 km) to State Route 87 and south 21 miles (34 km) to Theodore Roosevelt Lake. Payson is 19 miles (31 km) north via Routes 188 and 87. According to the United States Census Bureau, the Jakes Corner CDP has a total area of 1.4 square miles (3.7 km^{2}), all land.

== Demographics ==
Historical population
Census	Pop.	Note	%±
2020	98		—
U.S. Decennial Census

== Education ==
It is in the Payson Unified School District. Payson High School is the zoned comprehensive high school.
