= Pinal Mountains National Forest =

Former name of the Tonto National Forest area in Arizona

Coordinates: 33°17′N 110°49′W

Pinal Mountains National Forest was established as the Pinal Mountains Forest Reserve by the U.S. Forest Service in Arizona on March 20, 1905, with 45,760 acres (185.2 km^{2}). It became a National Forest on March 4, 1907, and encompassed the entirety of the Pinal Mountains south of Globe, Arizona and some areas surrounding the mountains. On January 13, 1908, the forest was combined with Tonto National Forest and the name was discontinued.
