= Theodore Roosevelt Lake Bridge =

1992 steel arch bridge in Gila and Maricopa Counties, Arizona

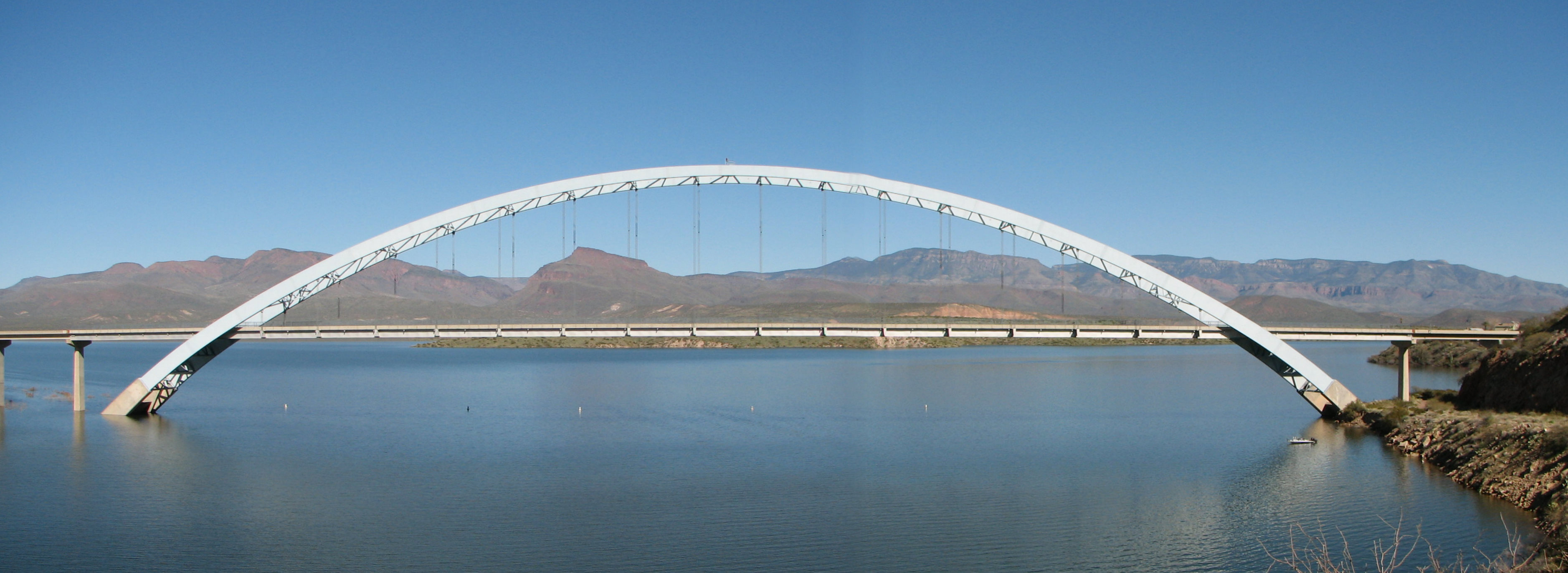
- Coordinates: 33°40′26″N 111°9′25″W
- Carries: Two lanes of SR 188
- Crosses: Theodore Roosevelt Lake
- Locale: Gila County – Maricopa County, Arizona
- Maintained by: AZDOT
- ID number: AZ 2028

Characteristics
- Design: Single Span Steel Arch bridge
- Total length: 2,198.9 ft (670.2 m)
- Width: 37.7 ft (11.5 m)
- Longest span: 1,079.8 ft (329.1 m) (tied-arch span)

History
- Opened: 1992

Statistics
- Daily traffic: 1,522 (2014)

The Theodore Roosevelt Lake Bridge is a vehicular bridge traversing Theodore Roosevelt Lake between Gila County and Maricopa County, Arizona. Prior to its completion, traffic on Arizona SR 188 traveled directly on top of the Theodore Roosevelt Lake Dam. The bridge's completion relieved traffic over the dam. It had been designed to accommodate the width of two Ford Model-T automobiles, but increasing vehicle widths meant that the dam could only support one-way traffic until the new bridge opened.

Per the United States Bureau of Reclamation, in 1995, along with other bridges such as the Brooklyn Bridge and Golden Gate Bridge, the bridge was listed by the American Consulting Engineers Council as one of the top twelve bridge designs in the United States, and is the "longest two-lane, single-span, steel-arch bridge in North America". The build contract was awarded to Edward Kraemer & Sons, Inc. of Plain, Wisconsin, with an overall total cost of $21.3 million USD in 1992. It was initially painted sky blue, but has since turned white.

Steel material for the bridge was originally a part of the Washington Street elevated in Boston, Massachusetts. When the elevated was torn down in 1987, the steel was shipped to Japan and melted into bars, then shipped again as building materials.
