= Roosevelt, Arizona =

CDP in Gila County, Arizona

- Census-designated place
- Location within Arizona Location within the United States
- Coordinates: 33°40′3″N 111°8′3″W
- Country: United States
- State: Arizona
- County: Gila

Area
  - Total: 2.70 sq mi (6.99 km^{2})
  - Land: 2.69 sq mi (6.97 km^{2})
  - Water: 0.0077 sq mi (0.02 km^{2})
- Elevation: 2,215 ft (675 m)

Population (2020)
  - Total: 26
  - Density: 9.7/sq mi (3.73/km^{2})
- Time zone: UTC-7 (MST (no DST))
- ZIP code: 85545
- Area code: 928
- FIPS code: 04-61300
- GNIS feature ID: 2582854

Roosevelt is a census-designated place (CDP) in Gila County, Arizona, United States. The population was 28 at the 2010 census.

== Geography ==
The CDP is located on the western edge of Gila County, on the south side of Theodore Roosevelt Lake, a reservoir on the Salt River. The western boundary of the CDP is the Maricopa County line. Arizona State Route 188 runs through Roosevelt, leading southeast 31 miles (50 km) to Globe, the Gila County seat, and northwest 48 miles (77 km) to Payson. Arizona State Route 88, the Apache Trail, has its northern terminus just west of Roosevelt at the Theodore Roosevelt Dam. The highway, which is unpaved for much of its distance, is a National Scenic Byway and leads southwest 45 miles (72 km) to Apache Junction at the eastern edge of the Phoenix area. The Roosevelt CDP is bordered to the southeast by Tonto National Monument.

According to the United States Census Bureau, the CDP has a total area of 3.1 square miles (8.0 km^{2}), of which 0.01 square miles (0.02 km^{2}), or 0.28%, is water.

=== Climate ===
Roosevelt has a hot semi-arid climate (Köppen: BSh) with long, extremely hot summers and short, mild winters.

Climate data for Roosevelt, Arizona (1991–2020 normals, extremes 1905–present)
Month	Jan	Feb	Mar	Apr	May	Jun	Jul	Aug	Sep	Oct	Nov	Dec	Year
Record high °F (°C)	80 (27)	87 (31)	99 (37)	100 (38)	113 (45)	117 (47)	116 (47)	115 (46)	115 (46)	104 (40)	90 (32)	83 (28)	117 (47)
Mean maximum °F (°C)	70.2 (21.2)	75.7 (24.3)	84.8 (29.3)	94.3 (34.6)	102.5 (39.2)	110.1 (43.4)	111.6 (44.2)	109.9 (43.3)	104.2 (40.1)	96.1 (35.6)	81.6 (27.6)	70.0 (21.1)	112.6 (44.8)
Mean daily maximum °F (°C)	61.0 (16.1)	65.8 (18.8)	73.6 (23.1)	81.9 (27.7)	91.2 (32.9)	102.0 (38.9)	103.7 (39.8)	101.9 (38.8)	96.2 (35.7)	84.6 (29.2)	71.1 (21.7)	60.1 (15.6)	82.8 (28.2)
Daily mean °F (°C)	50.3 (10.2)	54.1 (12.3)	60.6 (15.9)	68.1 (20.1)	77.1 (25.1)	87.2 (30.7)	90.9 (32.7)	89.2 (31.8)	83.4 (28.6)	72.0 (22.2)	59.5 (15.3)	50.1 (10.1)	70.2 (21.2)
Mean daily minimum °F (°C)	39.6 (4.2)	42.5 (5.8)	47.6 (8.7)	54.3 (12.4)	63.0 (17.2)	72.4 (22.4)	78.0 (25.6)	76.5 (24.7)	70.7 (21.5)	59.3 (15.2)	47.9 (8.8)	40.1 (4.5)	57.7 (14.3)
Mean minimum °F (°C)	31.4 (−0.3)	33.7 (0.9)	37.2 (2.9)	42.8 (6.0)	51.4 (10.8)	61.9 (16.6)	67.7 (19.8)	66.1 (18.9)	60.4 (15.8)	47.3 (8.5)	36.4 (2.4)	30.8 (−0.7)	29.2 (−1.6)
Record low °F (°C)	19 (−7)	19 (−7)	23 (−5)	29 (−2)	35 (2)	43 (6)	54 (12)	50 (10)	39 (4)	26 (−3)	24 (−4)	18 (−8)	18 (−8)
Average precipitation inches (mm)	2.21 (56)	1.70 (43)	1.72 (44)	0.58 (15)	0.33 (8.4)	0.13 (3.3)	1.57 (40)	2.10 (53)	1.42 (36)	0.98 (25)	1.08 (27)	2.09 (53)	15.91 (404)
Average snowfall inches (cm)	0.0 (0.0)	0.0 (0.0)	0.2 (0.51)	0.0 (0.0)	0.0 (0.0)	0.0 (0.0)	0.0 (0.0)	0.0 (0.0)	0.0 (0.0)	0.0 (0.0)	0.0 (0.0)	0.0 (0.0)	0.2 (0.51)
Average precipitation days (≥ 0.01 in)	4.9	4.6	4.4	1.9	1.7	0.8	5.0	6.3	4.3	3.1	3.0	5.3	45.3
Average snowy days (≥ 0.1 in)	0.0	0.0	0.0	0.0	0.0	0.0	0.0	0.0	0.0	0.0	0.0	0.0	0.0
Source: NOAA

== Demographics ==
Historical population
Census	Pop.	Note	%±
2020	26		—
U.S. Decennial Census
