= Arizona State Route 188 =

State highway in Arizona, United States

State Route 188
- SR 188 highlighted in red

Route information
- Maintained by ADOT
- Length: 60.85 mi (97.93 km)
- Existed: 1959–present

Major junctions
- South end: US 60 near Globe
- North end: SR 87 south of Rye

Location
- Country: United States
- State: Arizona

Highway system
- Arizona State Highway System; Interstate; US; State; Scenic Proposed; Former
← SR 187	→ SR 189

State Route 188 is a 60.85-mile (97.93 km) state highway located primarily in Gila County in the U.S. state of Arizona.

== Route description ==
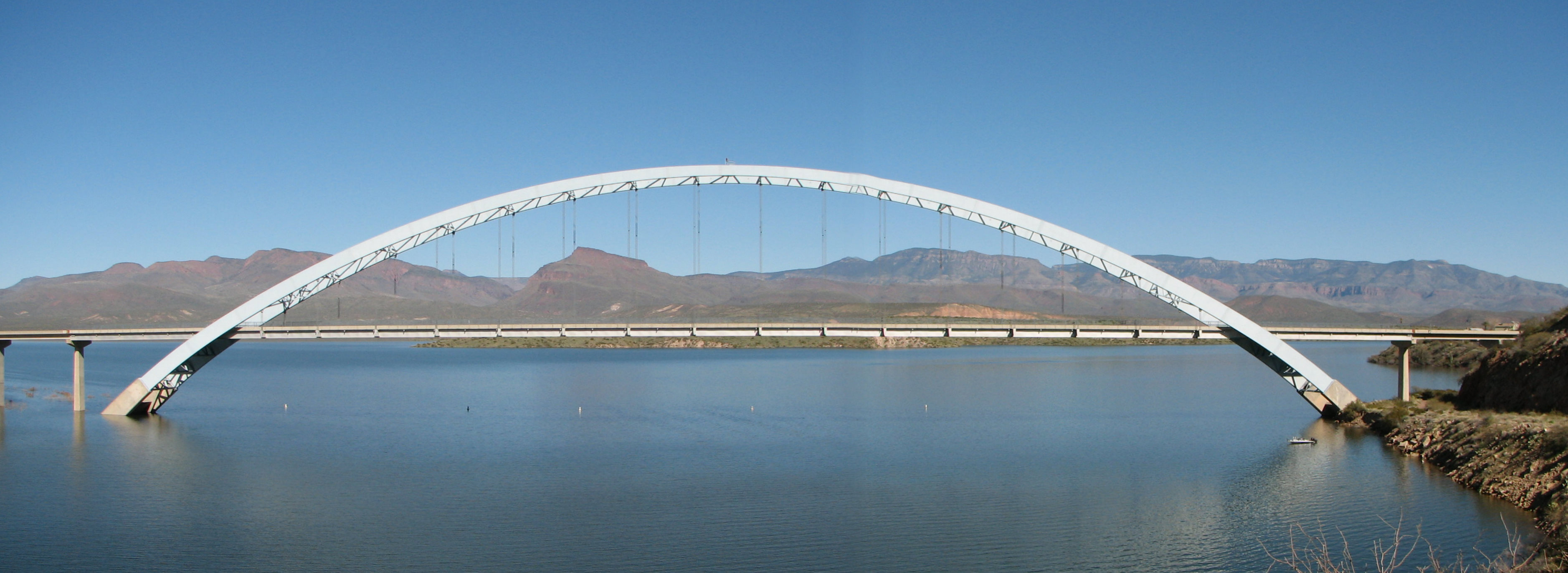
SR 188 crossing at Roosevelt Lake

The route, also known as Apache Trail at its southern end, starts at U.S. Route 60 in Globe, just north of Claypool, and runs generally northwest to a junction with State Route 288, then continues alongside Roosevelt Lake through Roosevelt Estates and Roosevelt. The route briefly enters Maricopa County, where it junctions with State Route 88, which takes over the Apache Trail designation to Apache Junction. The route originally followed a single-lane road down the canyon wall to the Theodore Roosevelt Dam, then crossed the dam to the other side of the canyon. A two-lane steel arch bridge upstream from the dam has now replaced this routing. SR 188 then re-enters Gila County, continuing through Tonto Basin, Punkin Center, and Jakes Corner. State Route 188 ends at State Route 87 south of Rye.

Between Claypool and Roosevelt Lake is an old loop road labelled "Old Highway 88"; originally State Route 88 continued down 188 from Roosevelt Lake to US 60 at Claypool. State Route 188 has been widened to a multi-lane highway along part of its length.

== History ==
SR 188 was established in 1957 from SR 88 to SR 87. On August 20, 1999, it extended over part of SR 88, completing its current length.

== Junction list ==
County	Location	mi	km	Destinations	Notes
Gila	Globe	0.00	0.00	US 60 – Globe, Phoenix	Southern terminus; road continues as Russell Road
Gila		14.64	23.56	SR 288 north (Desert to Tall Pines Scenic Road) – Young	
Maricopa		29.23	47.04	SR 88 west (Apache Trail west) – Apache Junction	Former southern terminus; now eastern terminus of SR 88
Roosevelt Lake		29.35	47.23	Roosevelt Lake Bridge	
Gila		60.85	97.93	SR 87 (Beeline Highway) – Phoenix, Payson	Northern terminus
1.000 mi = 1.609 km; 1.000 km = 0.621 mi
