= Hellsgate Wilderness =

Tonto National Forest, Gila County, Arizona, protected area

- IUCN category Ib (wilderness area)
- Location within the United States
- Location: Gila County, Arizona United States
- Nearest city: Payson, Arizona
- Coordinates: 34.1914275°N 111.1287414°W
- Area: 37,440 acres (151.5 km^{2})
- Established: 1984
- Governing body: U.S. Forest Service

The Hellsgate Wilderness is a 37,440-acre (151.5 km^{2}) protected wilderness within the Tonto National Forest in Gila County, Arizona, at the base of the Mogollon Rim. It was created by the U.S. Congress in 1984 and is managed by the U.S. Forest Service.

== Topography ==
The Hellsgate Wilderness is on the edge of the Mogollon Rim. The elevation change in the wilderness is 3,480 ft (1,060 m), with the highest point being Horse Mountain in the northeast corner. Tonto Creek is a perennial creek that cuts a 1,000 ft-deep (300 m) canyon through the wilderness. The terrain is subject to steep elevation changes throughout the entire wilderness area.

== Wildlife ==
Due to available water, the Hellsgate Wilderness is home to myriad animal life, including black bears, mountain lions, mule deer, coyotes, gray foxes, javelinas, and, beavers. Trout, catfish, and smallmouth bass live in the perennial creeks.

== History ==
The southern part of the Hellsgate Wilderness was home to the native American group known as the Salado. This civilization flourished along the banks of the Salt River in the 13th and 14th centuries. In the later part of the 14th century, the Salado went into decline and by 1400 the Hellgate Wilderness area was largely abandoned. Sometime in the 16th century, the Apache began using this area for a hunting ground and continued to do so until they were driven out by ranchers and miners of European descent.

In 1927, a Ryan Brougham airplane flown by Martin Jensen, carrying MGM's Leo the Lion, was forced to make an emergency landing in a box canyon in the Hellsgate Wilderness. Both pilot and lion survived with no injuries, and the canyon was named Leo Canyon after the incident. The wreckage of the plane was left in the canyon until 1991, when historic-airplane enthusiast Scott Gifford found it and removed it from the canyon via helicopter. He plans to restore the plane to airworthiness.

== Recreation ==
The Hellgsate Wilderness contains many trails for hiking as well as camping spots. However, usage of this area is light as trailheads are difficult to reach without 4-wheel-drive capability, and most trails are rated as challenging.

During the summer months, the wilderness's perennial creeks attract a small number of anglers.
