= Tonto Creek =

Stream in Gila County, Arizona

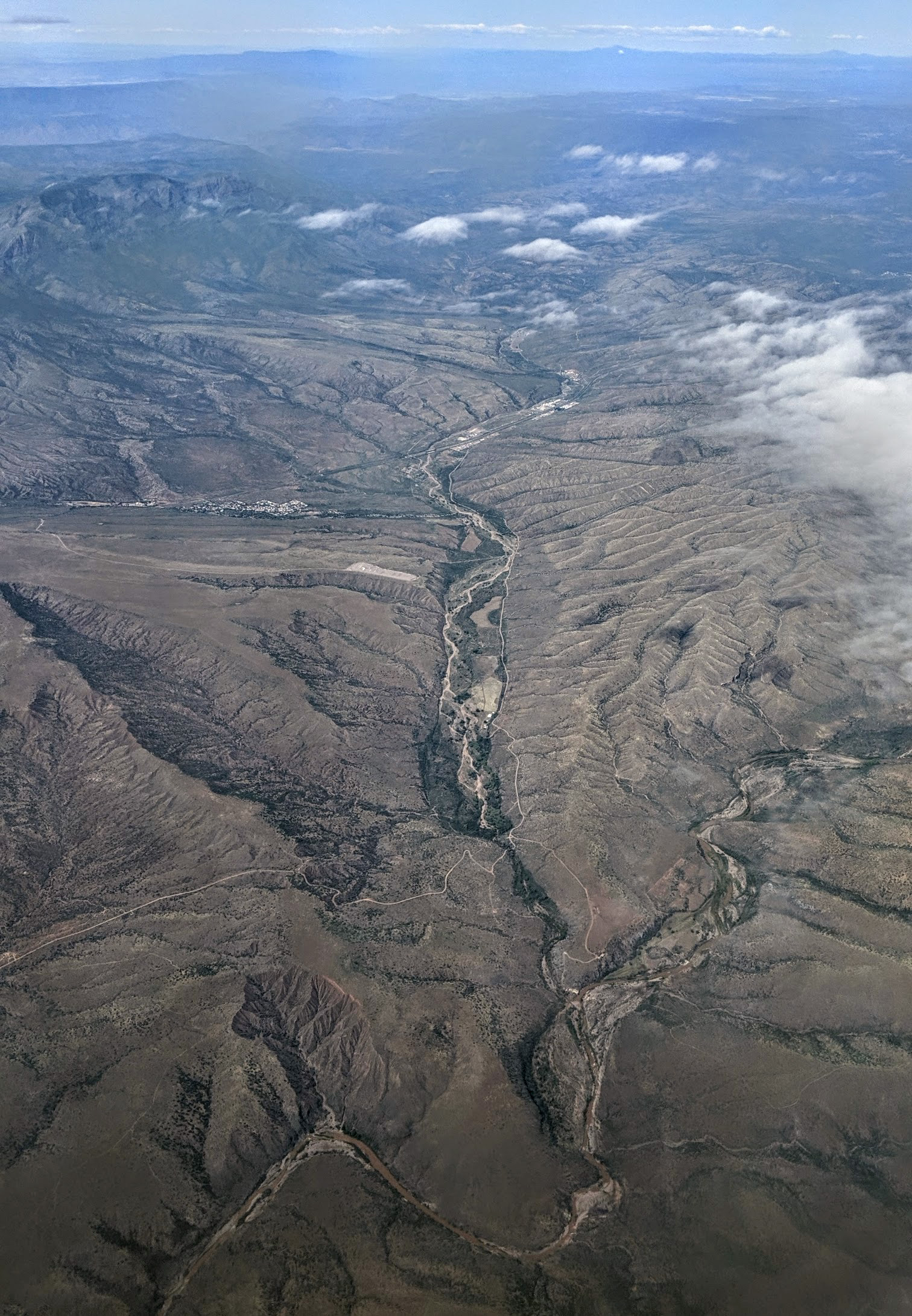
- Tonto Creek (right and foreground) with tributary Rye Creek (center background)

Location
- Country: United States
- State: Arizona
- County: Gila and Coconino

Physical characteristics
- Source
  - coordinates: 34°23′37″N 111°04′52″W
  - elevation: 7,640 feet (2,330 m)
- Mouth
  - location: Theodore Roosevelt Lake
  - coordinates: 33°40′48″N 111°09′05″W
  - elevation: 2,096 feet (639 m)
- Length: 72.5 mi (116.7 km)

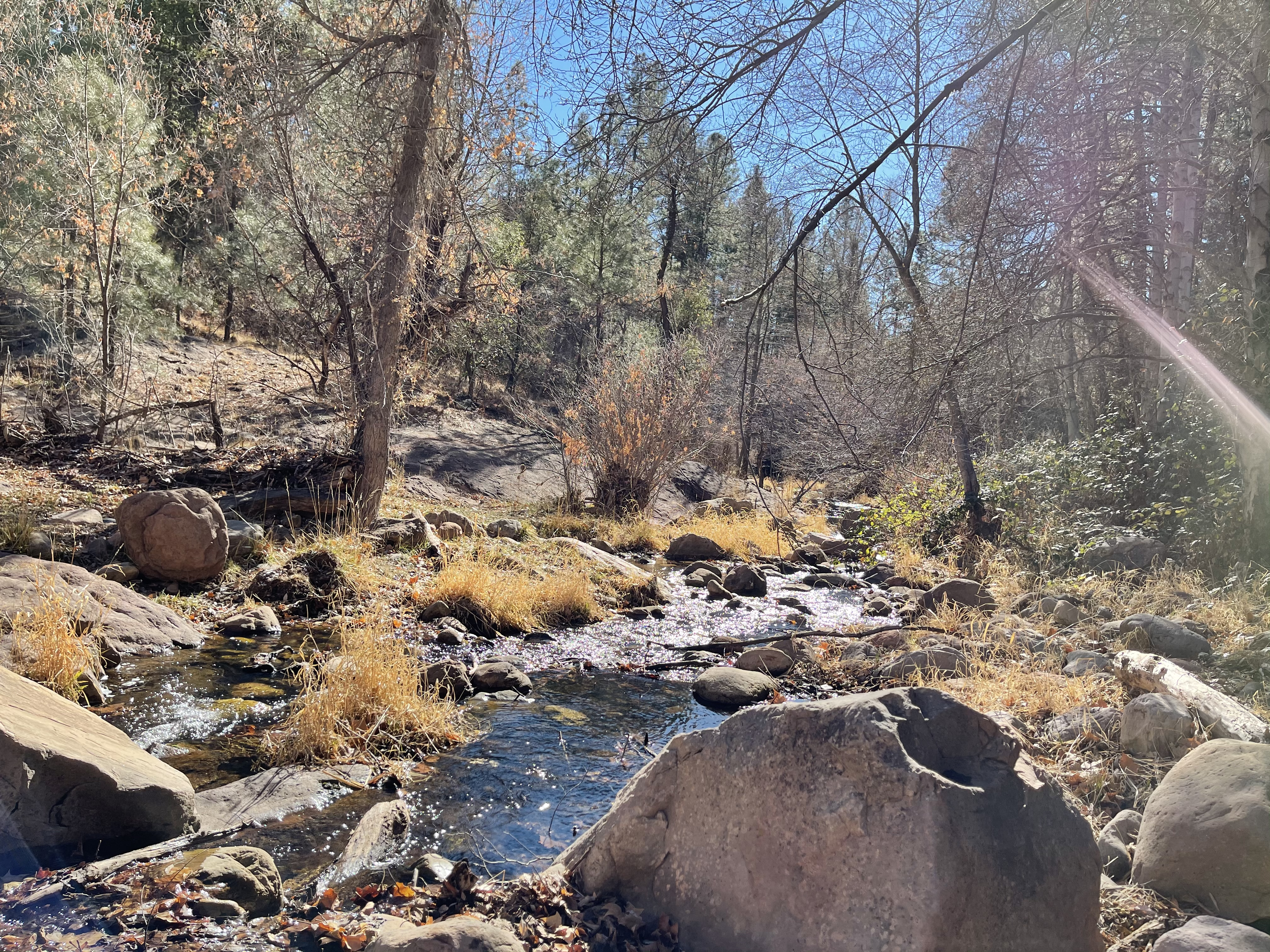
Tonto Creek in Arizona just after Horton Creek joins with Tonto Creek.

Tonto Creek is a 72.5-mile-long (116.7 km) stream located in the Mogollon Rim area of the state of Arizona on the north edge of the Tonto National Forest. The closest town, Payson, is 18 miles (29 km) away. Tonto Creek is a stream that flows year round, starting just below the Mogollon Rim, at the northern edge of Tonto National Forest. The creek continues its descent through the Hellsgate Wilderness area and eventually into a wide valley in the Sonoran Desert. It continues through the desert and into the Salt River within the north end of Theodore Roosevelt Lake. The facilities are maintained by Tonto National Forest division of the USDA Forest Service.

== Fish species ==
Fish in the stream include rainbow trout, brown trout, and brook trout.

== See also ==
- List of rivers of Arizona
