= Young, Arizona =

CDP in Gila County, Arizona

- Census-designated place
- Location in Gila County and the state of Arizona

- Location in the United States
- Coordinates: 34°06′42″N 110°55′45″W
- Country: United States
- State: Arizona
- County: Gila

Area
  - Total: 47.82 sq mi (123.86 km^{2})
  - Land: 47.79 sq mi (123.77 km^{2})
  - Water: 0.035 sq mi (0.09 km^{2})
- Elevation: 5,184 ft (1,580 m)

Population (2020)
  - Total: 588
  - Density: 12.3/sq mi (4.75/km^{2})
- Time zone: UTC-7 (MST (no DST))
- ZIP code: 85554
- Area code: 928
- FIPS code: 04-85330
- GNIS feature ID: 0036483

Young is an unincorporated community and census-designated place (CDP) in Gila County, Arizona, United States. The population was 588 as of the 2020 census.

== Geography ==
Young is located in northeastern Gila County at 34°06′42″N 110°55′45″W (34.111688, -110.929208), along Arizona State Route 288 (which becomes Gila County 512 to the north). SR 288 is paved within and north of the town, totaling about 10 miles (16 km) of pavement, but there is no fully paved road connecting Young with other highways. Young is surrounded by the Tonto National Forest.

There are two main roads in and out of Young, one north (from SR 260) and one south (from SR 188). From Arizona State Route 260 between mile markers 284 and 285 (east of Christopher Creek and west of Heber/Overgaard), go south along FR512 for about 26 miles (42 km). SR 288's northernmost 3 miles (5 km) have been paved (as of October 2010), leaving about 13 miles (21 km) of this road unpaved. The southern route starts at the intersection of SR 188 and SR 288 (near Roosevelt Lake) and continues north along SR 288 for 47 miles (76 km). About 15–16 miles (24–26 km) is unpaved. Four-wheel drive is recommended during inclement weather.

The nearest cities to Young are Payson, 60 miles (97 km) by road to the northwest, and Globe/Miami, 65 miles (105 km) to the south. From the Phoenix area, Young is about 150 miles (240 km) away and typically takes 2.5 to 3 hours by vehicle. As a result, most medical emergencies are tended to by Air Ambulance.

According to the United States Census Bureau, the CDP has a total area of 47.8 square miles (123.9 km^{2}), of which 0.04 square miles (0.1 km^{2}), or 0.07%, is water. The community is set in the Pleasant Valley, drained to the southeast by Cherry Creek, a tributary of the Salt River.

== History ==
Young played a central part in the Pleasant Valley War between 1887 and 1897. In September 1887, Sheriff Mulvernon of Prescott led a posse that pursued and killed John Graham and Charles Blevins during a shootout at "Perkins Store".

== Demographics ==
Historical population
Census	Pop.	Note	%±
2020	588		—
U.S. Decennial Census

Please note that the 2020 census showed high margins of error for the Young CDP.

As of the census of 2020, there were 588 people, and 235 households in the CDP. The population density was 13.4 inhabitants per square mile (5.2/km^{2}). There were 581 housing units at an average density of 10.06 per square mile (3.88/km^{2}). The racial makeup of the CDP was 96.08% White, 0.53% Native American, 0.36% Asian, 2.14% from other races, and 0.89% from two or more races. 3.39% of the population were Hispanic or Latino of any race.

There were 235 households, out of which 8.8% had children under the age of 18 living with them. The average family size was 2.35.

The median income for a household in the CDP was $40,313, and the median income for a family was $85,673.

== Technology and communications ==
Young first received outside electric power in 1965. Today Young has telephone service both wired (MTE Communications) and wireless. In October 2008, a cellular communications tower was erected on Turner Hill (located in north Young). Another cell tower was built in central Young. No cable television provider exists in Young, so satellite TV is typically used for television. In 2008, a major fiber optics installation was performed throughout the town, providing high speed internet (DSL). Dial-up or satellite Internet is no longer typically used for Internet access.

== Services ==
There are a number of small businesses in Young. There is a vineyard, two full-service restaurants, one gas station, two convenience stores, an auto parts store, an auto mechanic, a motel, numerous cabins and cottages for rent, a thrift shop, a public library, a refuse service, and a weekly medical clinic. Young also has a resident deputy and a volunteer fire department, and community center.

== Education ==
Only one school exists in Young: Young Public School, serving grades K–12. The school has a low student to teacher ratio. The school was upgraded from a C to an A rating in 2013, the only A rating given to any school in Gila County at that time.
