= Tonto National Forest =

Protected area in Arizona

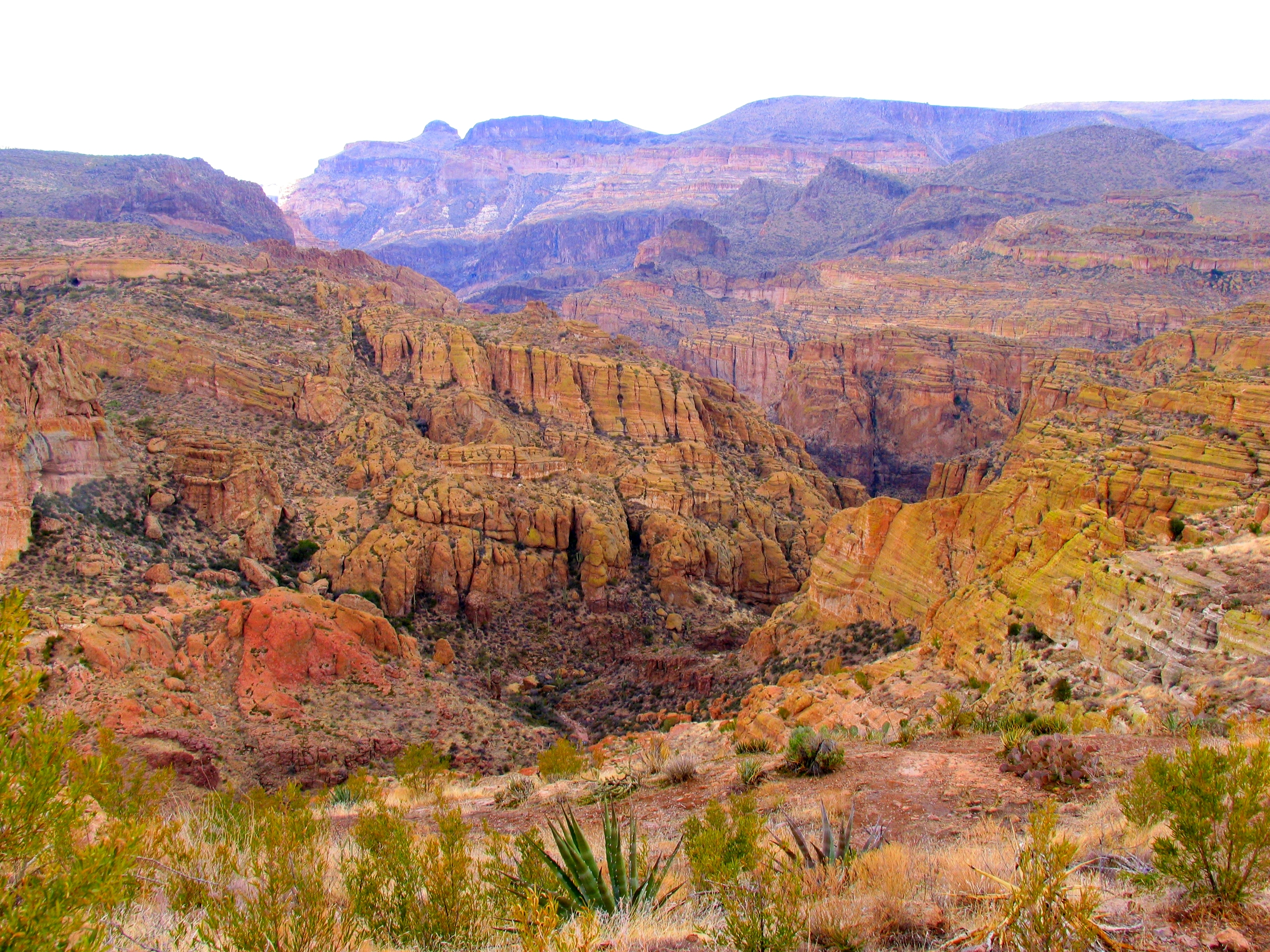
- Location: Gila, Maricopa, Yavapai, and Pinal counties, Arizona, U.S.
- Nearest city: Payson, Arizona
- Coordinates: 33.8°N 111.3°W
- Area: 2,873,200 acres (11,627 km^{2})
- Established: 1905
- Visitors: 5,922,000 (in 2005)
- Governing body: United States Forest Service
- Website: Tonto National Forest

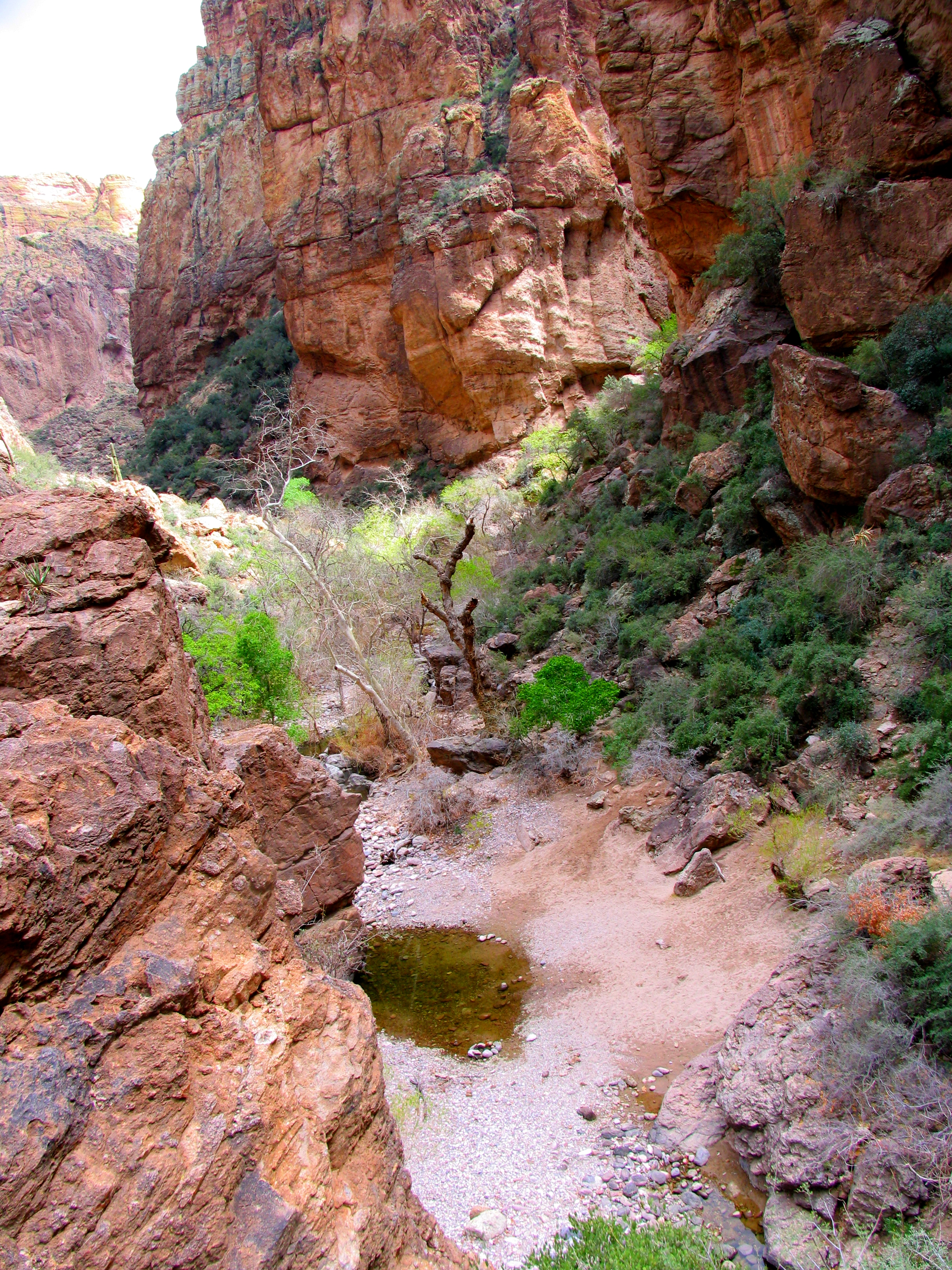
A pool of water, a remnant of the last rains, in a dry wash in Tonto National Forest

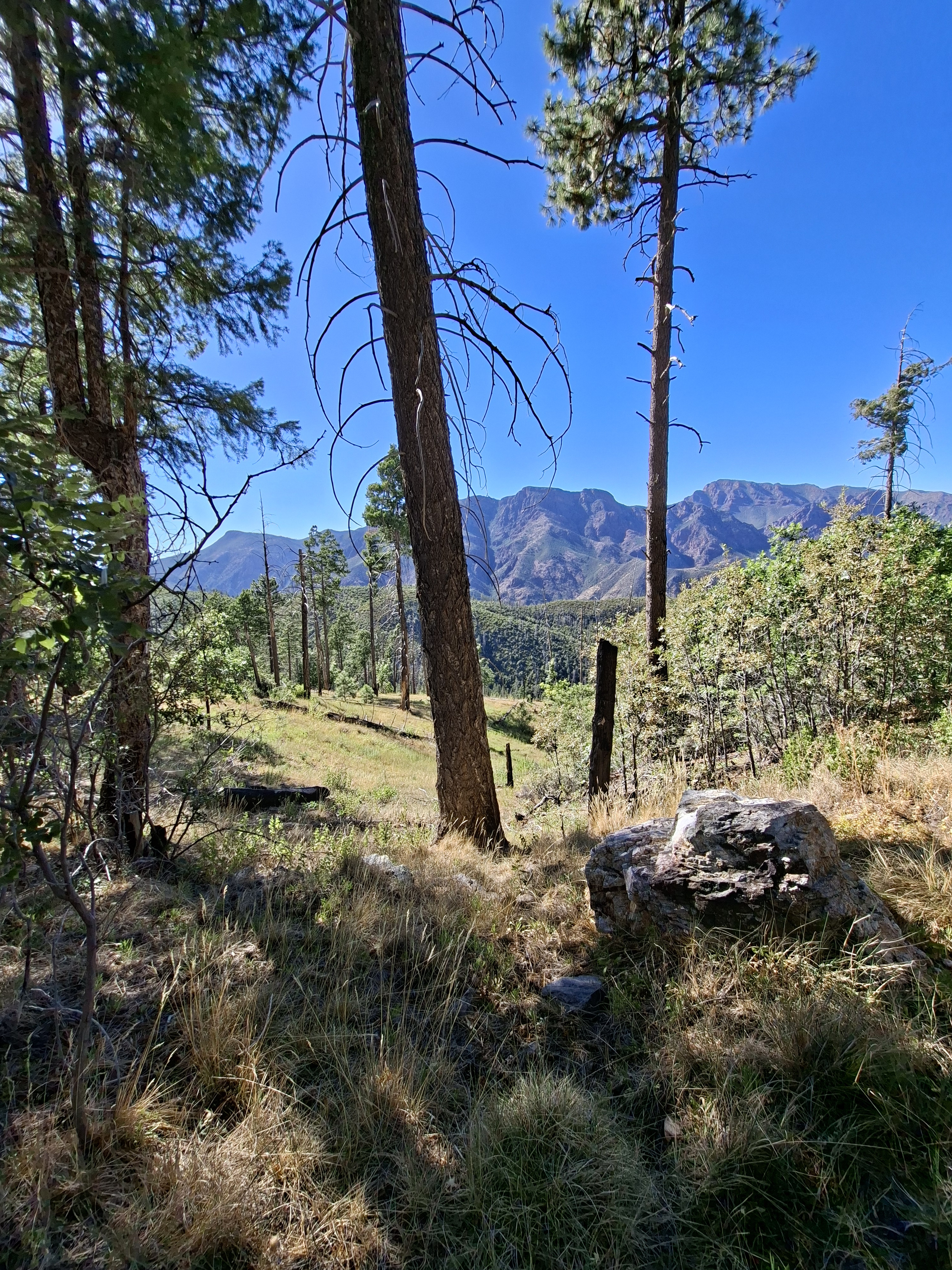
A pine-oak woodland grove along the Gold Ridge trail

The Tonto National Forest, encompassing 2,873,200 acres (1,162,700 ha; 11,627 km^{2}), is the largest of the six national forests in Arizona and is the ninth largest national forest in the United States. The forest has diverse scenery, with elevations ranging from 1,400 feet (427 m) in the Sonoran Desert to 7,400 feet (2,256 m) in the ponderosa pine forests of the Mogollon Rim. The Tonto National Forest is also one of the most visited "urban" forests in the United States.

The boundaries of the Tonto National Forest are the Phoenix metropolitan area to the south, the Mogollon Rim to the north and the San Carlos and Fort Apache Indian Reservation to the east. The Tonto (Spanish for "foolish") is managed by the USDA Forest Service and its headquarters are in Phoenix. There are local ranger district offices in Globe, Mesa, Payson, Roosevelt, Scottsdale, and Young.

On June 13, 2020, a wildfire ignited in the Tonto Basin area. The Bush Fire, as it was named, burned 193,455 acres (783 km^{2}), becoming Arizona's fifth largest fire on record. The fire was sufficiently contained by July 1, prompting the Incident Management Team to transition control to the Forest Service, which subsequently conducted a Burned Area Emergency Response (BAER) assessment to begin rehabilitation efforts. Investigators determined the fire was human-caused.

== Wildlife ==
Many wildlife species inhabit the forest including Colorado desert raccoons, bald eagles, New Mexico black bears, Mearns coyotes, Arizona skunks, bobcats, greater roadrunners, prairie falcons, Coues' white-tailed deer, long-eared owls, desert mule deer, Western red-tailed hawks, Great blue herons, North American cougars, American barn owls, ring-tailed cats, American kestrels, pronghorns, javelinas, and Rocky Mountain elk.

== Lakes, rivers and streams ==
The Tonto National Forest has six cold water reservoirs:

- Bartlett Lake
- Horseshoe Lake

These four are created by the Salt River chain of dams:

- Saguaro Lake
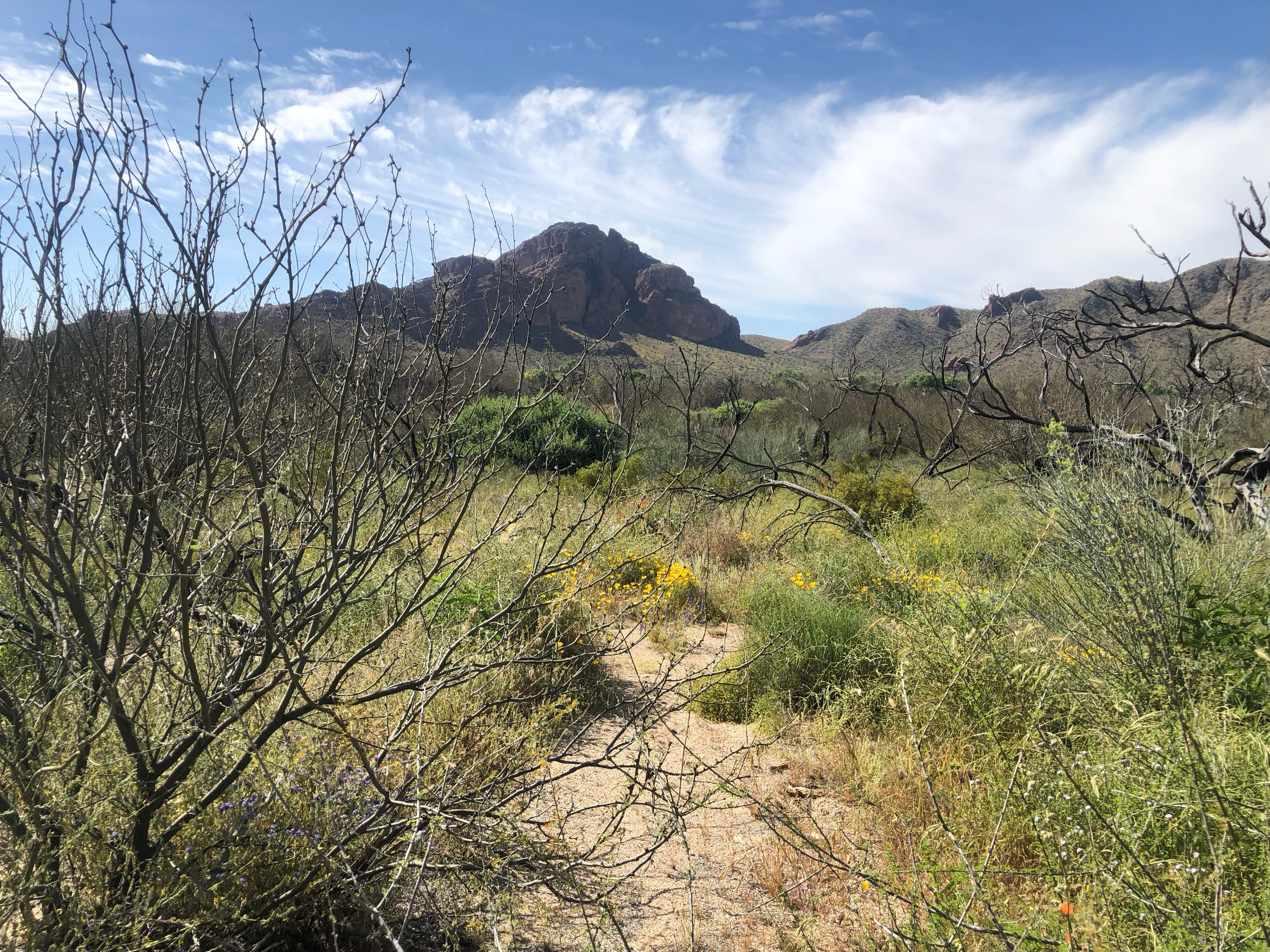
- Photo of the lower salt river several years after a wildfire that cleared the area
  Canyon Lake
- Apache Lake
- Theodore Roosevelt Lake

== Wilderness areas ==
There are eight federally designated wilderness areas within (or partially within) the Tonto National Forest:

- Four Peaks Wilderness
- Hellsgate Wilderness
- Mazatzal Wilderness (partly in Coconino NF)
- Pine Mountain Wilderness (partly in Prescott NF)
- Salome Wilderness
- Salt River Canyon Wilderness
- Sierra Ancha
- Superstition Wilderness

A portion of the Verde Wild and Scenic River also lies within the forest.

== History ==
The Tonto Forest Reserve was established on October 3, 1905 by the United States General Land Office. In 1906 the forest reserves were transferred to the U.S. Forest Service, and on March 4, 1907 Tonto became a National Forest. On January 13, 1908 the Pinal Mountains National Forest was added along with other lands. On July 1, 1908 part of Black Mesa National Forest and other lands were added, and on July 1, 1953 part of Crook National Forest was added.

=== Proposed land transfer to Rio Tinto Group for copper mining ===
A land swap proposed as a part of the 2015 National Defense Authorization Act would permit a subsidiary of the Rio Tinto mining conglomerate, Resolution Copper Co., to acquire 2,422 acres of the Tonto National Forest, considered sacred by the San Carlos Apache Tribe, for purposes of copper mining. This proposal, in Section 3003, titled "Southeast Arizona Land Exchange", is strongly opposed by many Native Americans, including the 57 member tribes of The Affiliated Tribes of Northwest Indians, and by the Great Plains Tribal Chairmen's Association.

== See also ==
- Fossil Creek
- List of national forests of the United States
- Tonto National Monument, a National Park Service unit completely surrounded by Tonto National Forest
- Pinal Mountains
- Shoofly Village Ruin
- OpenStreetMap relation, with boundaries
