= Theodore Roosevelt Lake =

Reservoir on the Salt River, Gila County, Arizona, US

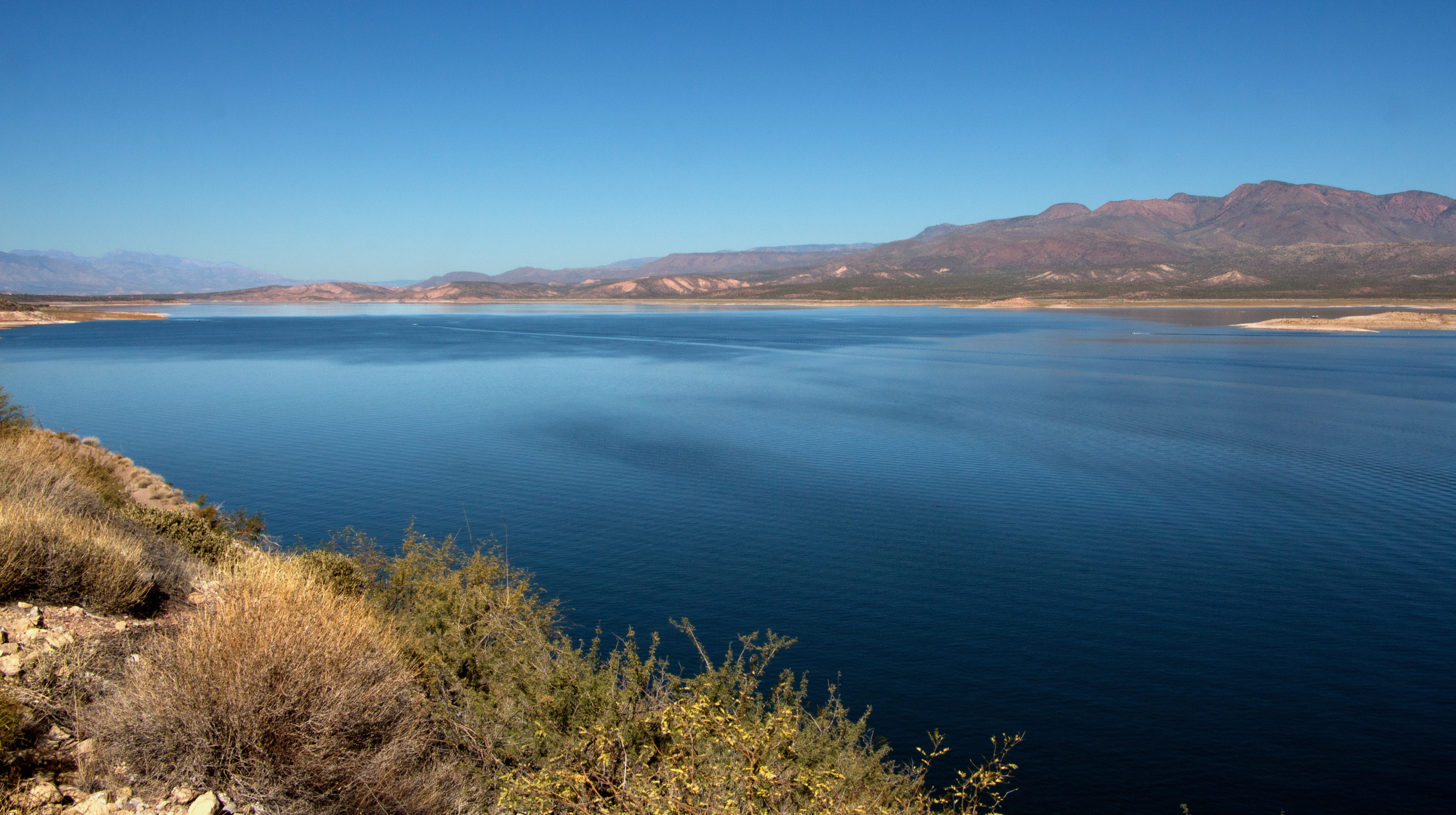
- Theodore Roosevelt Lake in Tonto National Forest.

- Location within Arizona
- Location: Gila County, Arizona, United States
- Coordinates: 33°40′18″N 111°09′40″W
- Type: reservoir
- Primary inflows: Salt River, Tonto Creek
- Catchment area: 5,830 mi^{2} (15,100 km^{2})
- Basin countries: United States
- Managing agency: Salt River Project
- Max. length: 22.4 mi (36.0 km)
- Max. width: 2 mi (3.2 km)
- Surface area: 21,493 acres (8,698 ha)
- Max. depth: 349 ft (106 m)
- Water volume: 1,653,043 acre⋅ft (2.039 km^{3}) (conservation); 2,910,200 acre⋅ft (3.590×10^{9} m^{3}) (flood control)
- Shore length^{1}: 128 mi (206 km)
- Surface elevation: 2,094 ft (638 m)
- ^{1} Shore length is not a well-defined measure.

Theodore Roosevelt Lake (usually called Roosevelt Lake, sometimes Lake Roosevelt) is a large reservoir formed by Theodore Roosevelt Dam on the Salt River in Arizona as part of the Salt River Project (SRP). Located roughly 80 miles (130 km) northeast of Phoenix in the Salt River Valley, Theodore Roosevelt is the largest lake or reservoir located entirely within the state of Arizona (Lake Mead and Lake Powell are larger but are both located partially within the bordering states of Nevada and Utah respectively). The reservoir and the masonry dam that created it, Roosevelt Dam, were both named after US president Theodore Roosevelt who dedicated the dam himself on March 18, 1911. Roosevelt Lake is a popular recreation destination within the Tonto National Forest, which manages the facilities at the lake.

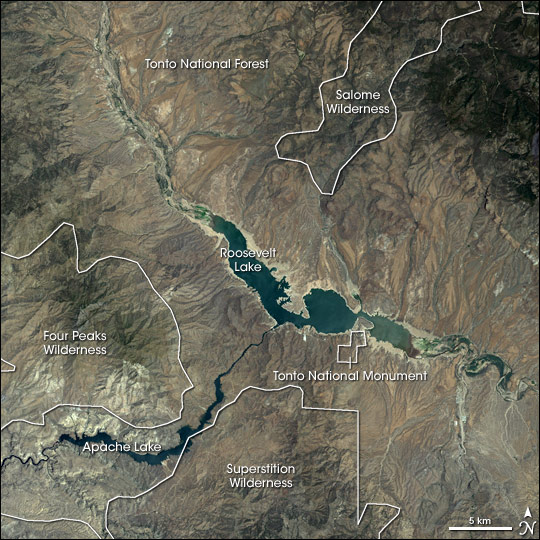
Satellite image of Theodore Roosevelt Lake and surrounding geographic features.

Roosevelt Lake is the oldest of the six reservoirs constructed and operated by the Salt River Project. It also has the largest storage capacity of the SRP lakes with the ability to store 1,653,043 acre-feet (2.039 km^{3}) of water when the conservation limit of Roosevelt Dam is reached. When the dam is in flood-control mode, the lake can store 2,910,200 acre⋅ft (3.590 km^{3}) of water; however, the US Army Corps of Engineers requires all water over the conservation limit to be released from the lake within 20 days.

== Geography ==
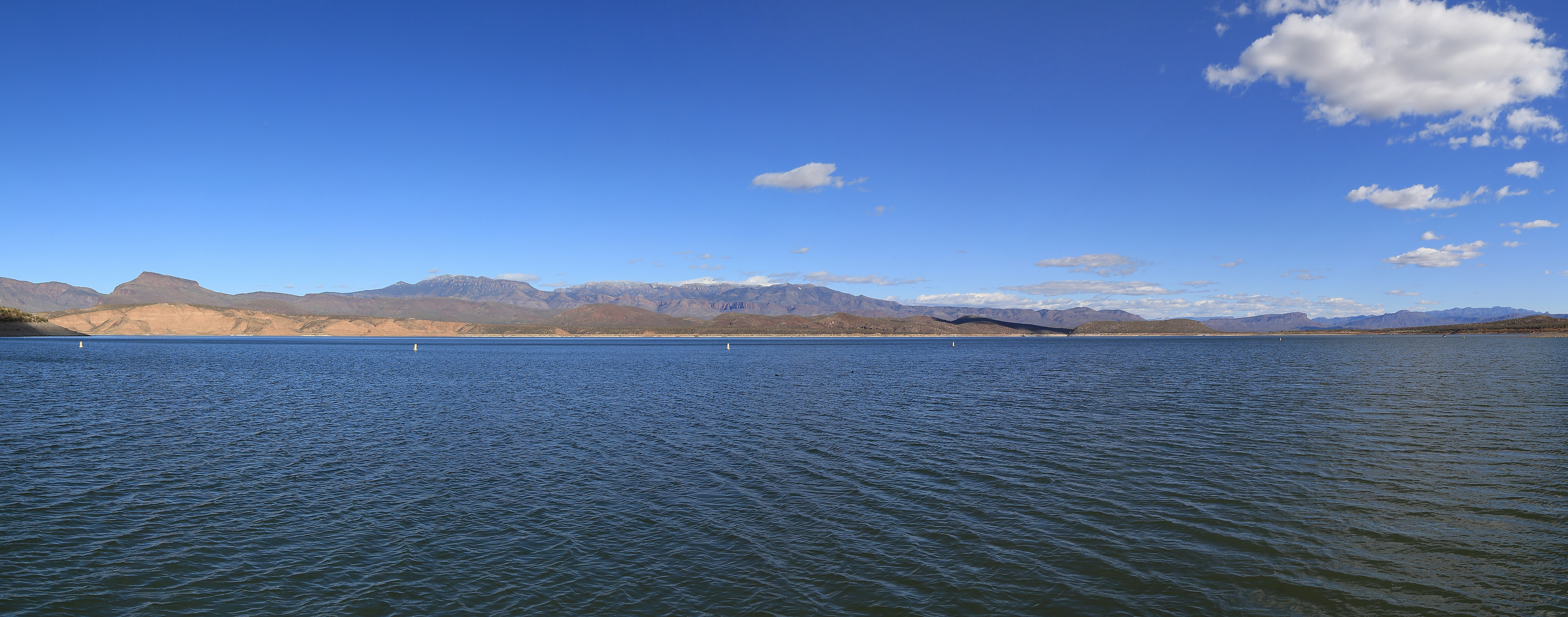
Theodore Roosevelt Lake

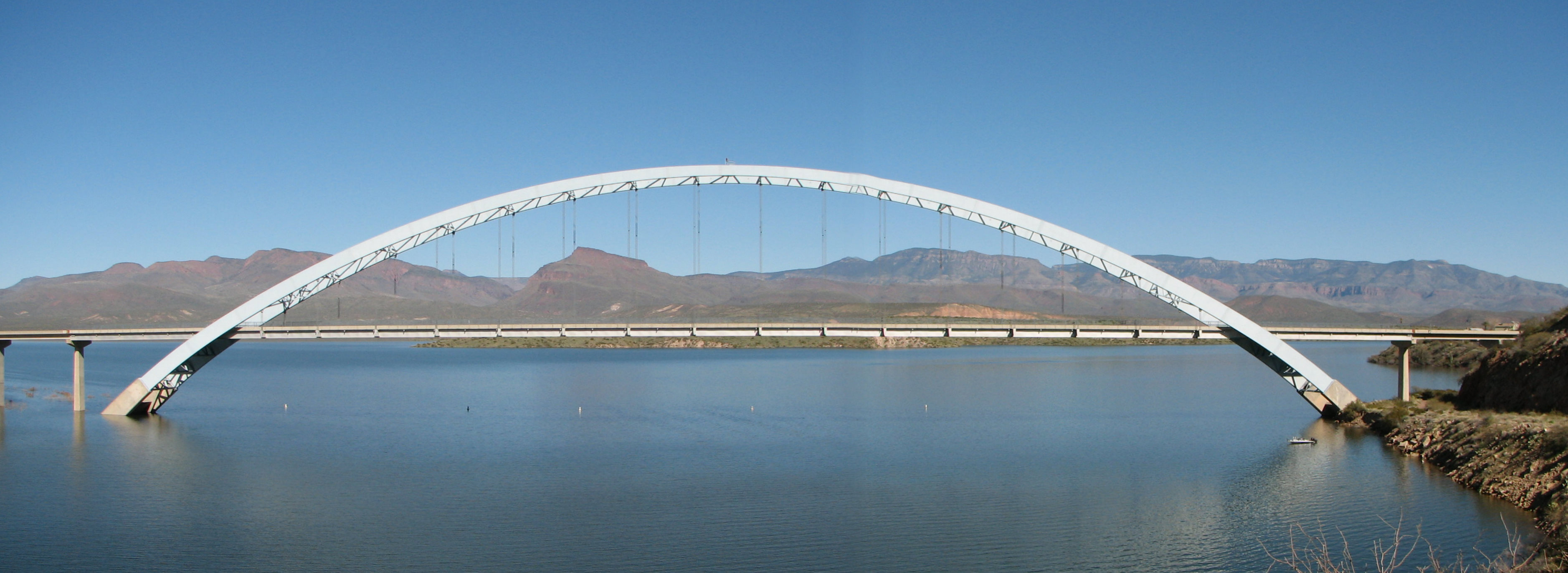
Roosevelt Lake Bridge

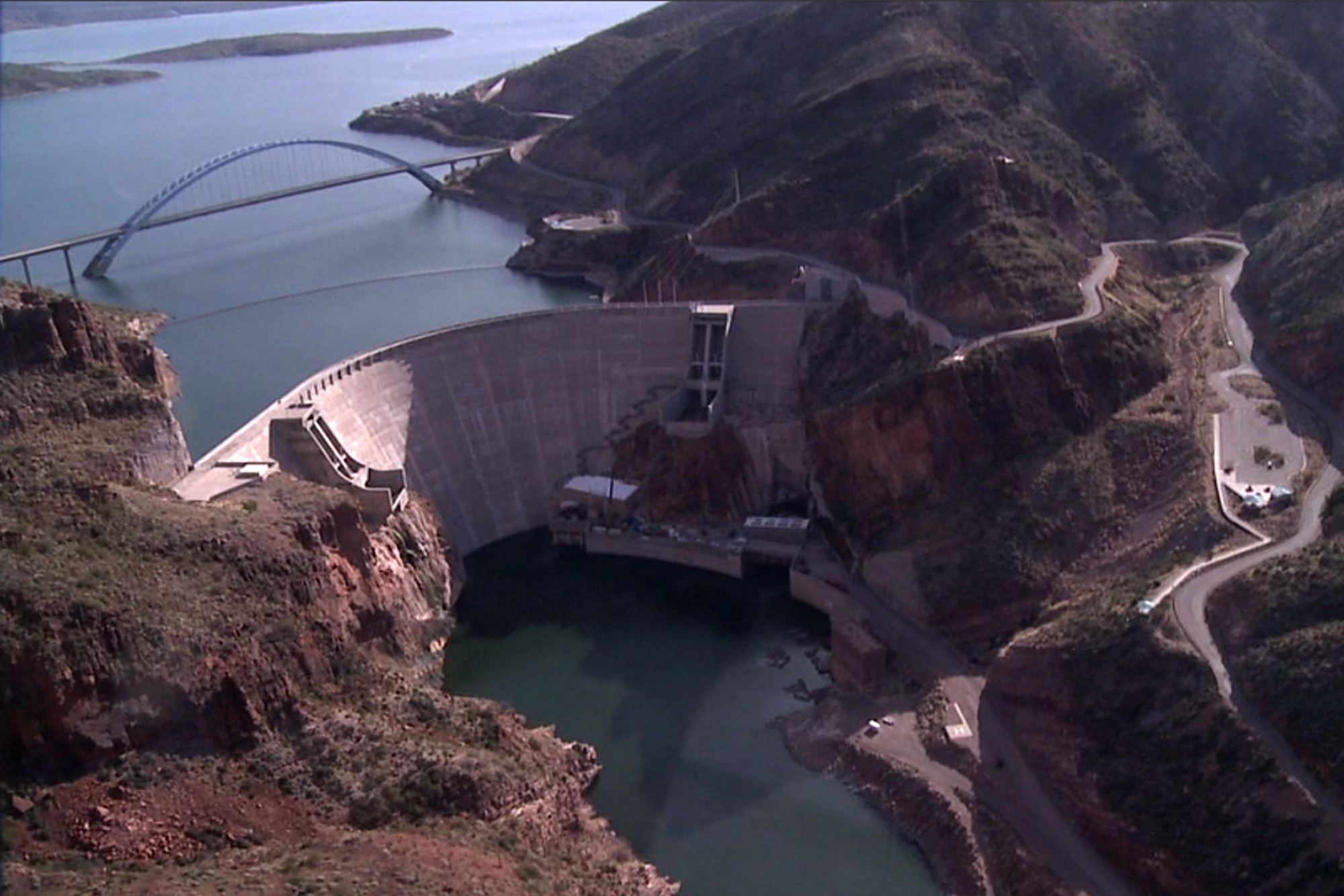
Aerial view of the dam

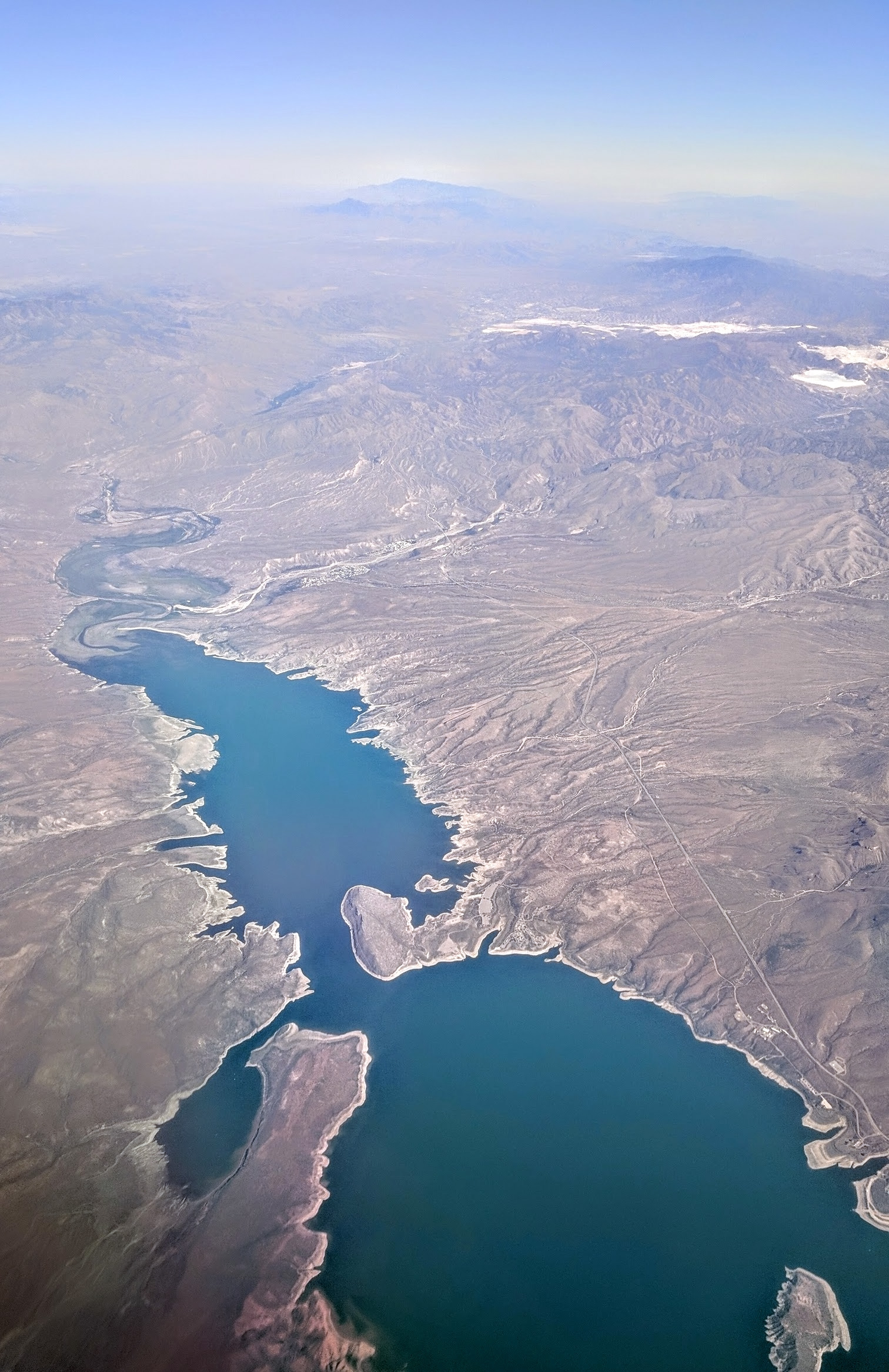
Aerial view of the upper part of the lake

Roosevelt Lake is located in central Arizona almost entirely within Gila County, although a small portion lies in Maricopa County. Located about 4 miles (6.4 km) upstream from Apache Lake (the next SRP reservoir on the Salt River), Roosevelt Lake occupies about 10 miles (16 km) of the original Salt River riverbed. The lake also extends for about 8 miles (13 km) up Tonto Creek, a significant tributary of the Salt with its headwaters along the Mogollon Rim.

The lake covers much of the southern portion of the Tonto Basin, a low-lying area between the Sierra Ancha Mountains, Mazatzal Mountains (including Four Peaks), and the Superstition Mountains. State Route 188 travels along the shore of the lake for much of its length. Tonto National Monument is located 4 miles (6.4 km) from Roosevelt Dam. Parts of the monument provide views of much of the reservoir.

== Recreation and wildlife ==
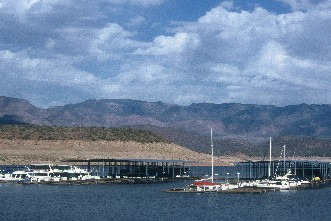
Roosevelt Lake Marina

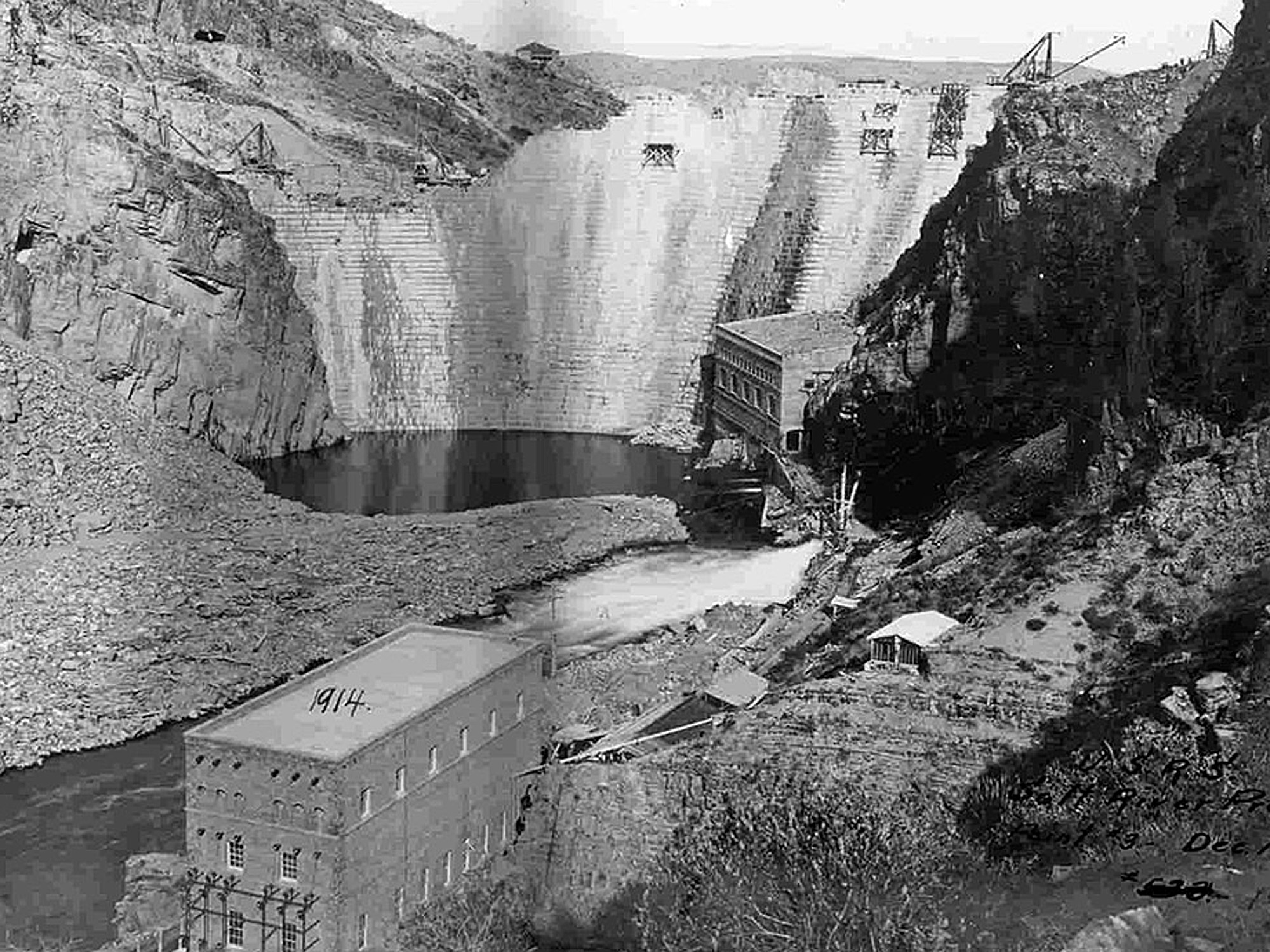
Theodore Roosevelt Dam under construction in 1906.

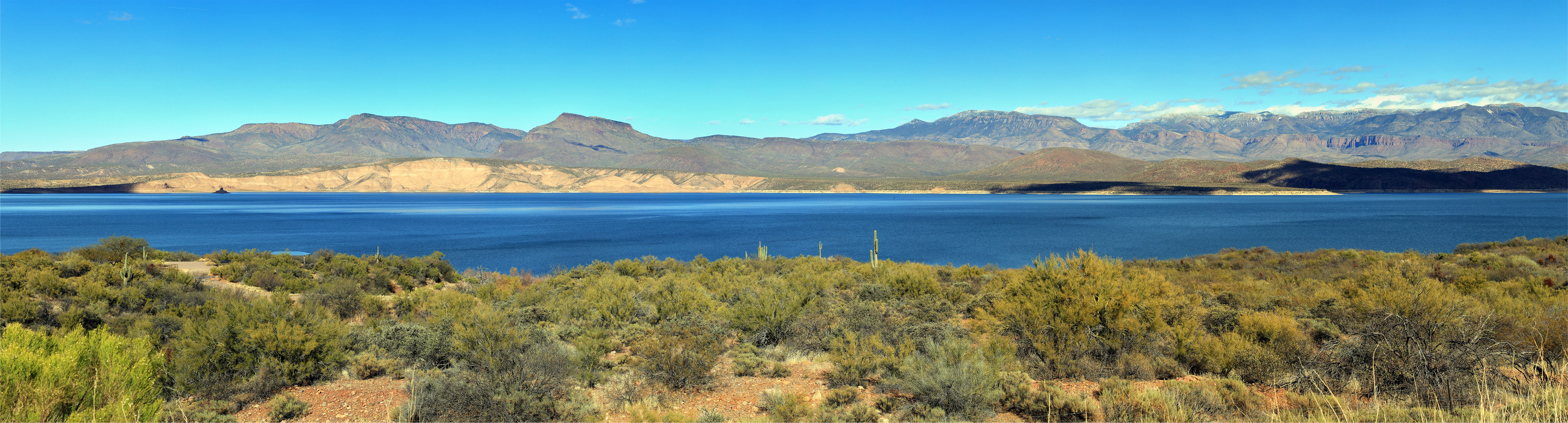
Panorama of Roosevelt Lake

Tonto National Forest operates camping and day use areas around Roosevelt Lake.

Fishing is a common recreational activity at Roosevelt Lake. The lake is home to a variety of game fish including crappie, carp, sunfish, flathead and channel catfish, and smallmouth bass and largemouth bass. There was a slot size limit of between 13 and 16 inches for the bass, and only one can be taken per day.

Lake Roosevelt once hosted one of the most significant population of the federally endangered southwestern willow flycatcher. Since the lake's rise following heavy rains in the winter of 2005, the population dynamics between this site and the other significant Arizona population (on the San Pedro River) are unclear.

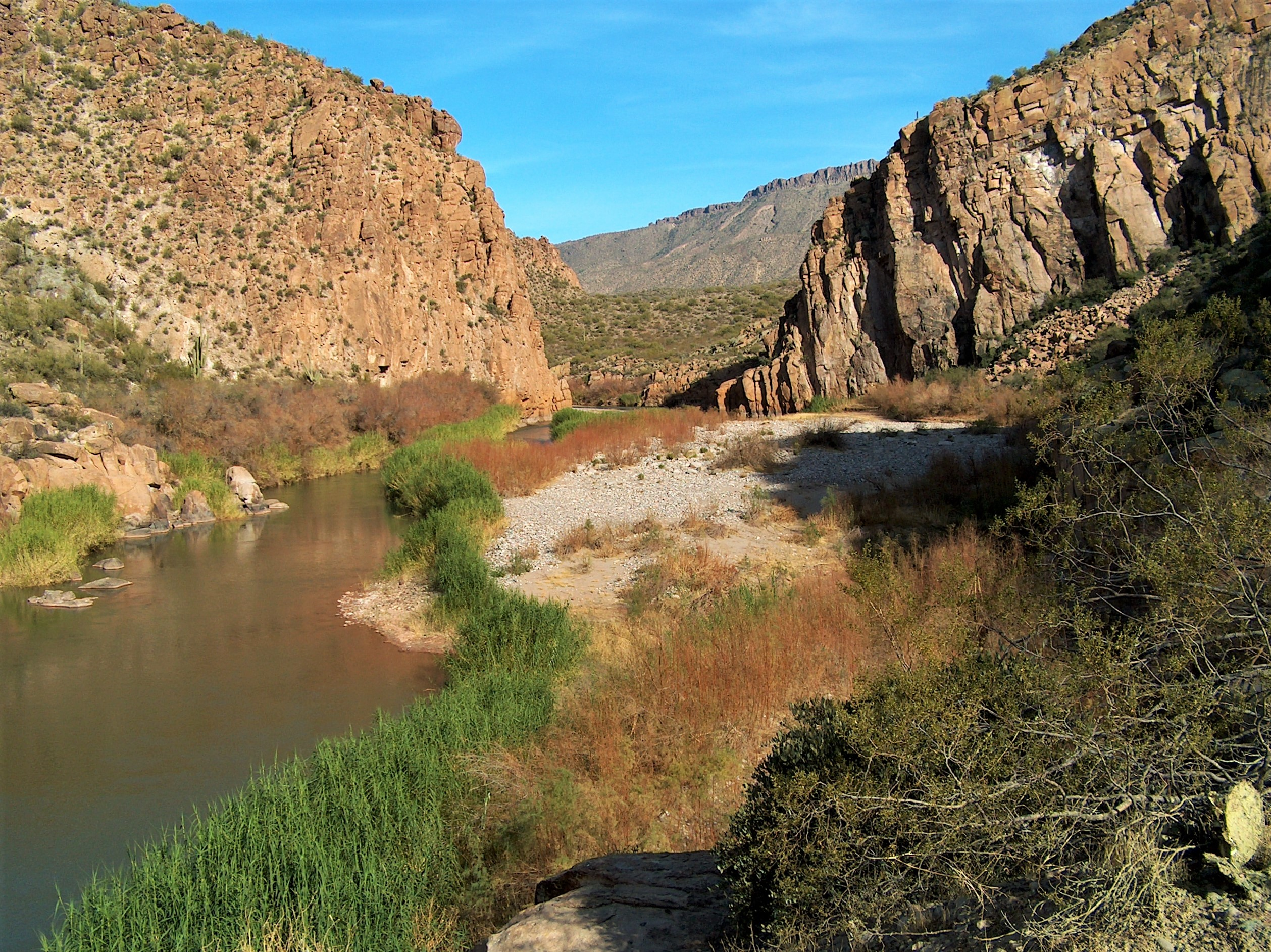
Eastern entrance to Roosevelt Lake

There are several Arizona Trail trailheads in the vicinity. The 800 miles (1,300 km) long hiking trail extending from the Arizona-Mexico border to Utah crosses the Salt River on the State Route 188 bridge that crosses Theodore Roosevelt Lake just northeast of Roosevelt Dam.

The lake is home to the Grapevine Airstrip, a small general aviation recreational airstrip located a quarter mile from the shore. The airstrip hosts numerous fly-ins a year.
