= Ray High School =

Ray High School may refer to one of the following:

- Ray High School (Arizona); Kearny, Arizona
- W. B. Ray High School; Corpus Christi, Texas
