= Kearny, Arizona =

Town in Pinal County, Arizona

- Town
- Motto: "The Heart of the Copper Basin"
- Location of Kearny in Pinal County, Arizona.
- Coordinates: 33°3′15″N 110°54′32″W
- Country: United States
- State: Arizona
- County: Pinal
- Incorporated: 1959

Government
  - Mayor: Curtis Stacy

Area
  - Total: 2.74 sq mi (7.09 km^{2})
  - Land: 2.69 sq mi (6.98 km^{2})
  - Water: 0.042 sq mi (0.11 km^{2})
- Elevation: 1,860 ft (567 m)

Population (2020)
  - Total: 1,741
  - Density: 645.8/sq mi (249.35/km^{2})
- Time zone: UTC-7 (MST (no DST))
- ZIP code: 85137
- Area code: 520
- FIPS code: 04-37200
- GNIS feature ID: 6633
- Website: Town of Kearny

Kearny is a town in Pinal County, Arizona, United States. The town was named after General Stephen Watts Kearny, who passed through the area on November 7, 1846, while leading 100 dragoons to California. As of the 2020 census, Kearny had a population of 1,741. The economic base of Kearny and nearby towns is the Ray mine and Hayden Smelter, both owned and operated by ASARCO.

== History ==
Kearny was built by the Kennecott Mining Company in 1958 as a planned community to accommodate the populations of nearby Ray, Sonora and Barcelona, which were about to be swallowed by Kennecott's expanding open-pit copper mine. While many houses in the town were newly built, some mine employees had their homes moved down the road. Kearny was officially incorporated in 1959.

== Geography ==
Kearny is located at 33°3′15″N 110°54′32″W (33.054160, -110.908857).

The town sits near the Gila River in the Copper Basin area along with its sister cities, Hayden and Winkelman. According to the United States Census Bureau, the town has a total area of 2.8 square miles (7.3 km^{2}), all land.

=== Climate ===
According to the Köppen Climate Classification system, Kearny has a warm-summer Mediterranean climate, abbreviated "Csa" on climate maps.

== Demographics ==
Historical population
Census	Pop.	Note	%±
1960	902		—
1970	2,829		213.6%
1980	2,646		−6.5%
1990	2,262		−14.5%
2000	2,249		−0.6%
2010	1,950		−13.3%
2020	1,741		−10.7%
U.S. Decennial Census

=== 2020 census ===
As of the 2020 census, Kearny had a population of 1,741. The median age was 43.6 years. 24.1% of residents were under the age of 18 and 25.0% of residents were 65 years of age or older. For every 100 females there were 105.1 males, and for every 100 females age 18 and over there were 103.1 males age 18 and over.

0.0% of residents lived in urban areas, while 100.0% lived in rural areas.

There were 670 households in Kearny, of which 31.6% had children under the age of 18 living in them. Of all households, 48.4% were married-couple households, 21.8% were households with a male householder and no spouse or partner present, and 21.6% were households with a female householder and no spouse or partner present. About 23.7% of all households were made up of individuals and 14.2% had someone living alone who was 65 years of age or older.

There were 802 housing units, of which 16.5% were vacant. The homeowner vacancy rate was 1.6% and the rental vacancy rate was 14.1%.

Racial composition as of the 2020 census
Race	Number	Percent
White	1,187	68.2%
Black or African American	14	0.8%
American Indian and Alaska Native	30	1.7%
Asian	14	0.8%
Native Hawaiian and Other Pacific Islander	0	0.0%
Some other race	202	11.6%
Two or more races	294	16.9%
Hispanic or Latino (of any race)	752	43.2%

=== 2000 census ===
As of the census of 2000, there were 2,249 people, 791 households, and 616 families residing in the town. The population density was 805.4 inhabitants per square mile (311.0/km^{2}). There were 873 housing units at an average density of 312.6 per square mile (120.7/km^{2}). The racial makeup of the town was 77.3% White, 0.3% Black or African American, 0.8% Native American, 0.1% Asian, 18.4% from other races, and 3.2% from two or more races. 38.4% of the population were Hispanic or Latino of any race.

There were 791 households, out of which 34.8% had children under the age of 18 living with them, 65.0% were married couples living together, 9.2% had a female householder with no husband present, and 22.1% were non-families. 19.1% of all households were made up of individuals, and 10.6% had someone living alone who was 65 years of age or older. The average household size was 2.84 and the average family size was 3.25.

In the town, the population was spread out, with 29.9% under the age of 18, 7.6% from 18 to 24, 21.7% from 25 to 44, 26.7% from 45 to 64, and 14.1% who were 65 years of age or older. The median age was 37 years. For every 100 females, there were 96.8 males. For every 100 females age 18 and over, there were 89.5 males.

The median income for a household in the town was $39,906, and the median income for a family was $42,313. Males had a median income of $40,056 versus $23,684 for females. The per capita income for the town was $16,797. About 12.1% of families and 13.2% of the population were below the poverty line, including 16.0% of those under age 18 and 19.9% of those age 65 or over.

== Education ==
Kearny is part of the Ray Unified School District, made up of two schools: Ray Junior-Senior High School, and Ray Elementary School.

== Transportation ==
Kearny Airport is a general aviation airport located in the southern section of the town. In 2003 it received the Arizona Department of Transportation's Airport of the Year award. The airport has a single asphalt runway, 3,400 feet (1,000 m) in length and 60 feet (18 m) in width, with a field elevation of 1,833 feet (559 m) above mean sea level.

== See also ==
- List of cities and towns in Arizona
- Ray, Arizona
