= Black advance =

Political disruption

The term black advance is used by political strategists to refer to an attempt to disrupt the advance operations of political opponents during an election campaign.

Notable examples have included the theft of speeches, break-ins of offices to secure political information, infiltration of advance staff working a particular event, disinformation campaigns to cause lower attendance at rallies, and disrupting rallies through various means.

== Notable Examples ==
In a California senatorial race, a university student named Dick Tuck was given the task of being the local "advance" person for a Richard Nixon speech, even though Tuck worked for the Helen Gahagan Douglas campaign. Tuck accepted the job and proceeded to book a huge auditorium, invite only a handful of people, stalled for a lot of time with a long-winded introduction, and informed the crowd Nixon would speak on the International Monetary Fund, which Nixon did not know much about.

At the end of the rally, Nixon asked Tuck what his name was, then said, "Dick Tuck, you've made your last advance." Tuck became legendary for what amounted to diligent, low-grade obstruction of Nixon's campaign. In one instance, he switched the signs on two different buses, one labeled "Nixon" and one labeled "VIP's." The switch caused Nixon to be delivered to a hotel rather than a live television appearance.

In another case, Tuck interfered with a "photo-op," by commissioning new signage in Chinese to accompany some "Welcome Nixon" signs at a Chinatown, San Francisco, rally. Tuck's signs read, in Chinese, "What about the huge loan?" in a reference to a loan that Howard Hughes had made to Nixon's brother Donald. Tuck was reportedly dismayed that "huge" was the closest the Chinese characters could come to spelling out the word "Hughes."
