= Hayden High School (Arizona) =

Public school in Winkelman, Arizona

Location
- 824 Thorne Avenue; Winkelman, Arizona 85192; United States; 32°59′41″N 110°46′18″W

Information
- School type: Public high school
- Established: 1936 (90 years ago)
- School district: Hayden-Winkelman Unified School District
- CEEB code: 030165
- Principal: Jeff Gregorich
- Teaching staff: 7.25 (FTE)
- Grades: 9-12
- Enrollment: 86 (2023–2024)
- Student to teacher ratio: 11.86
- Colors: Royal blue and white
- Mascot: Lobos
- Website: www.hwusd.org

Hayden High School is a high school in Hayden, Arizona. It is part of the Hayden-Winkelman Unified School District; it was founded in 1936 to serve the mining community.
