= Ray, Arizona =

- Ghost town
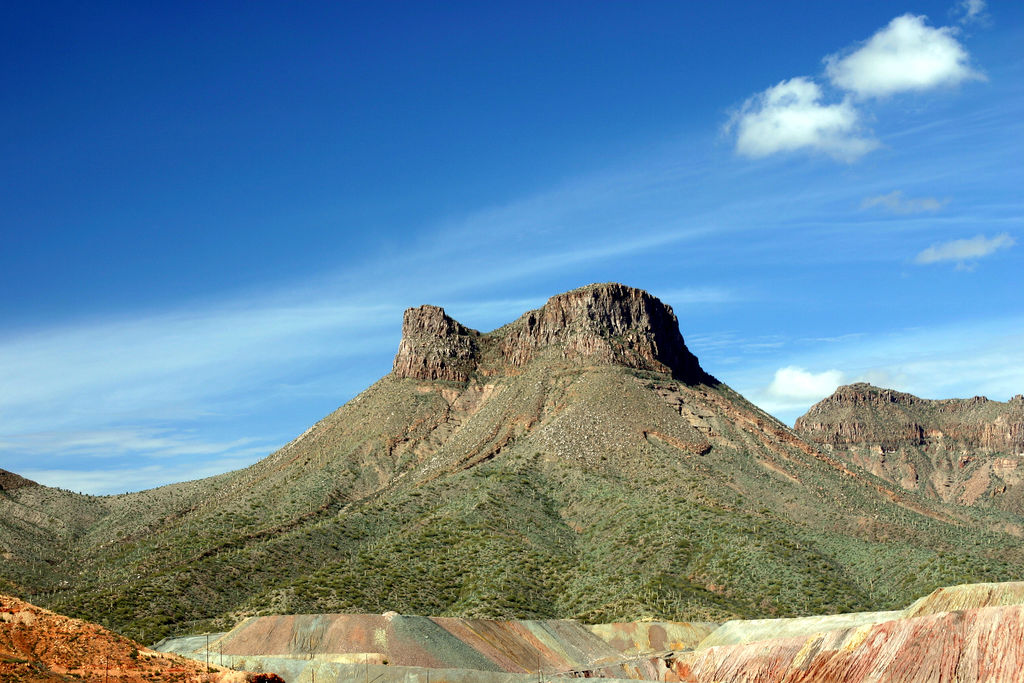
- Teapot Mesa, above Ray mine

- Location within Arizona
- Coordinates: 33°11′00″N 110°59′51″W
- Country: United States
- State: Arizona
- County: Pinal
- Elevation: 2,123 ft (647 m)
- Time zone: UTC-7 (MST (no DST))

Ray is a ghost town in Pinal County, Arizona, United States; it is mostly known for the large copper mine there. It was named after the nearby Ray mine, which was begun by the Ray Copper Company in 1882, after the sister of one of the miners, whose name was Bullinger.

The town of Kearny was founded by the Kennecott Mining Company in 1958 as a planned community to accommodate the populations of Ray, Barcelona and Sonora, which were about to be enveloped by Kennecott's copper mine. Relocation to Kearny began in 1958.

The Copper Basin Railway ran through the town.

A newspaper, the Arizona Copper Camp, was published in Ray from 1910 to 1920.

== Notable people ==
- Edward Landers Drew, died during a shootout near Ray, 1911
- Tom Graeff, actor, producer, director, born in Ray
- Gory Guerrero, wrestler, born in Ray
- Jeanmarie Simpson, theatre and film artist and activist, born in Ray
