= Winkelman, Arizona =

Town in Gila and Pinal Counties, Arizona

- Town
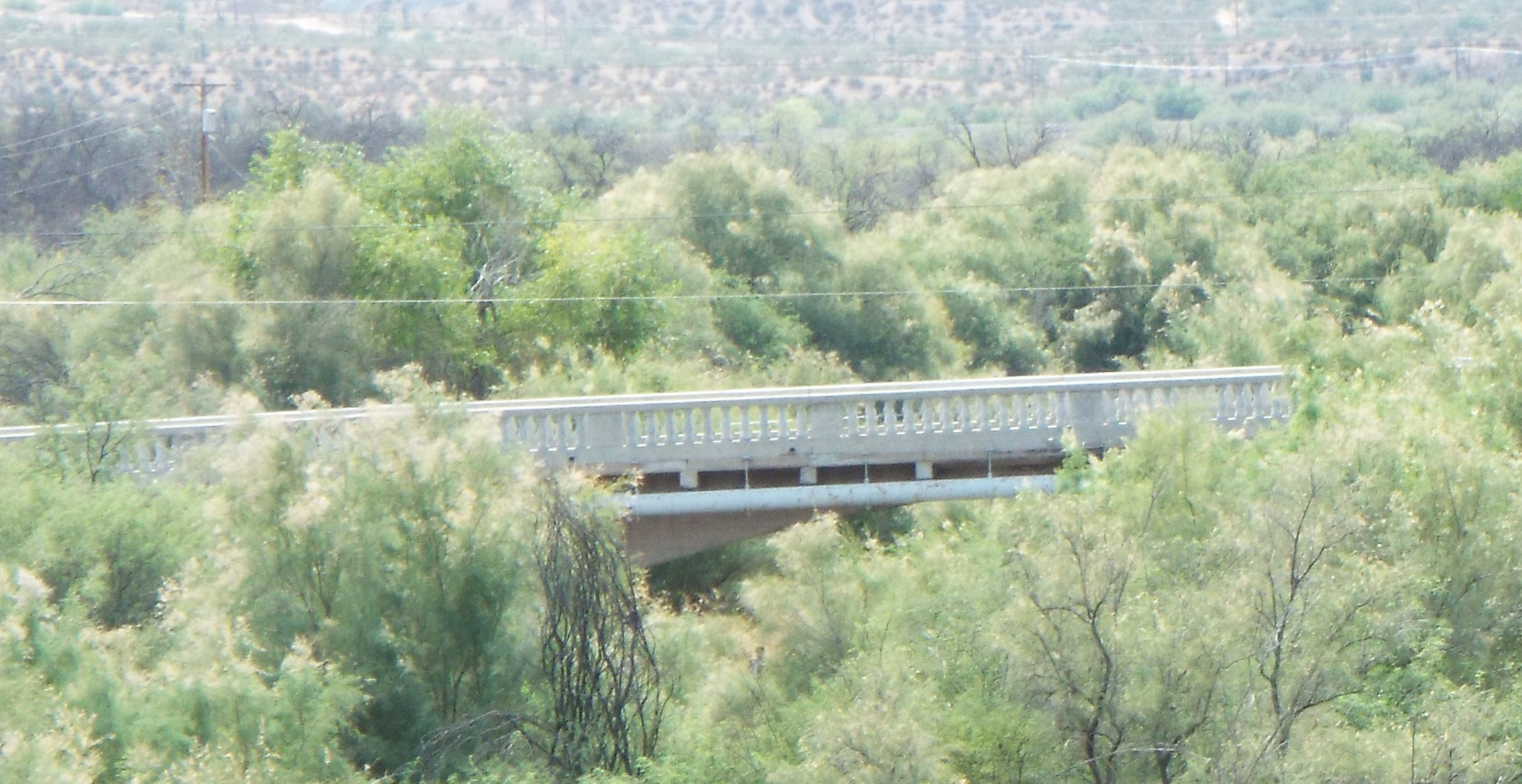
- Historic Winkelman Luten Bridge

- Location of Winkelman in Gila County and Pinal County, Arizona

- Location in the United States
- Coordinates: 32°59′17″N 110°46′13″W
- Country: United States
- State: Arizona
- Counties: Gila, Pinal

Area
  - Total: 0.77 sq mi (2.00 km^{2})
  - Land: 0.77 sq mi (1.99 km^{2})
  - Water: 0.0039 sq mi (0.01 km^{2})
- Elevation: 2,000 ft (600 m)

Population (2020)
  - Total: 296
  - Density: 384.9/sq mi (148.61/km^{2})
- Time zone: UTC-7 (MST (no DST))
- ZIP code: 85192
- Area code: 520
- FIPS code: 04-83790
- GNIS feature ID: 13926
- Website: Official website

Winkelman is a town in Gila and Pinal counties in Arizona, United States. As of the 2020 census, Winkelman had a population of 296.

== History ==
The community was named after Peter Winkelman, a local cattleman.

== Geography ==
Winkelman is located at the southern tip of Gila County at 32°59′17″N 110°46′13″W (32.988142, -110.770240). Winkelman is adjacent to Hayden. The unincorporated community of Dudleyville is south of Winkelman, in Pinal County.

According to the United States Census Bureau, the town has a total area of 0.73 square miles (1.9 km^{2}), all land. The Gila River passes along the eastern and southern sides of town.

== Demographics ==
Historical population
Census	Pop.	Note	%±
1910	484		—
1920	573		18.4%
1930	729		27.2%
1940	524		−28.1%
1950	548		4.6%
1960	1,123		104.9%
1970	974		−13.3%
1980	1,060		8.8%
1990	676		−36.2%
2000	443		−34.5%
2010	353		−20.3%
2020	296		−16.1%
U.S. Decennial Census

At the 2000 census, 443 people, 160 households, and 112 families lived in the town. The population density was 612.3 inhabitants per square mile (236.4/km^{2}). The 194 housing units had an average density of 268.1 per square mile (103.5/km^{2}). The racial makeup of the town was 62.1% White, 0.2% Black or African American, 36.1% from other races, and 1.6% from two or more races. About 74.7% of the population were Hispanic or Latino of any race.

Of the 160 households, 30.6% had children under 18 living with them, 46.9% were married couples living together, 15.6% had a female householder with no husband present, and 29.4% were not families; 26.3% of households were one person and 11.9% were one person 65 or older. The average household size was 2.77 and the average family size was 3.35.

The age distribution was 29.3% under 18, 9.9% from 18 to 24, 21.2% from 25 to 44, 25.1% from 45 to 64, and 14.4% 65 or older. The median age was 37 years. For every 100 females, there were 95.2 males. For every 100 females age 18 and over, there were 92.0 males.

The median household income was $25,455 and the median family income was $38,250. Males had a median income of $34,583 versus $17,250 for females. The per capita income for the town was $10,506. About 20.0% of families and 27.2% of the population were below the poverty line, including 42.5% of those under age 18 and 16.7% of those age 65 or over.

== Schools ==
Winkelman is home to Winkelman Elementary School and Hayden High School, located adjacent to each other and operated by the Hayden-Winkelman Unified School District.

== Notable people ==
- Alfredo Chavez Marquez (1922–2014), United States District Court judge, born in Winkelman
- Louie Espinoza (born 1962), professional boxer

== Images ==
Winkelman
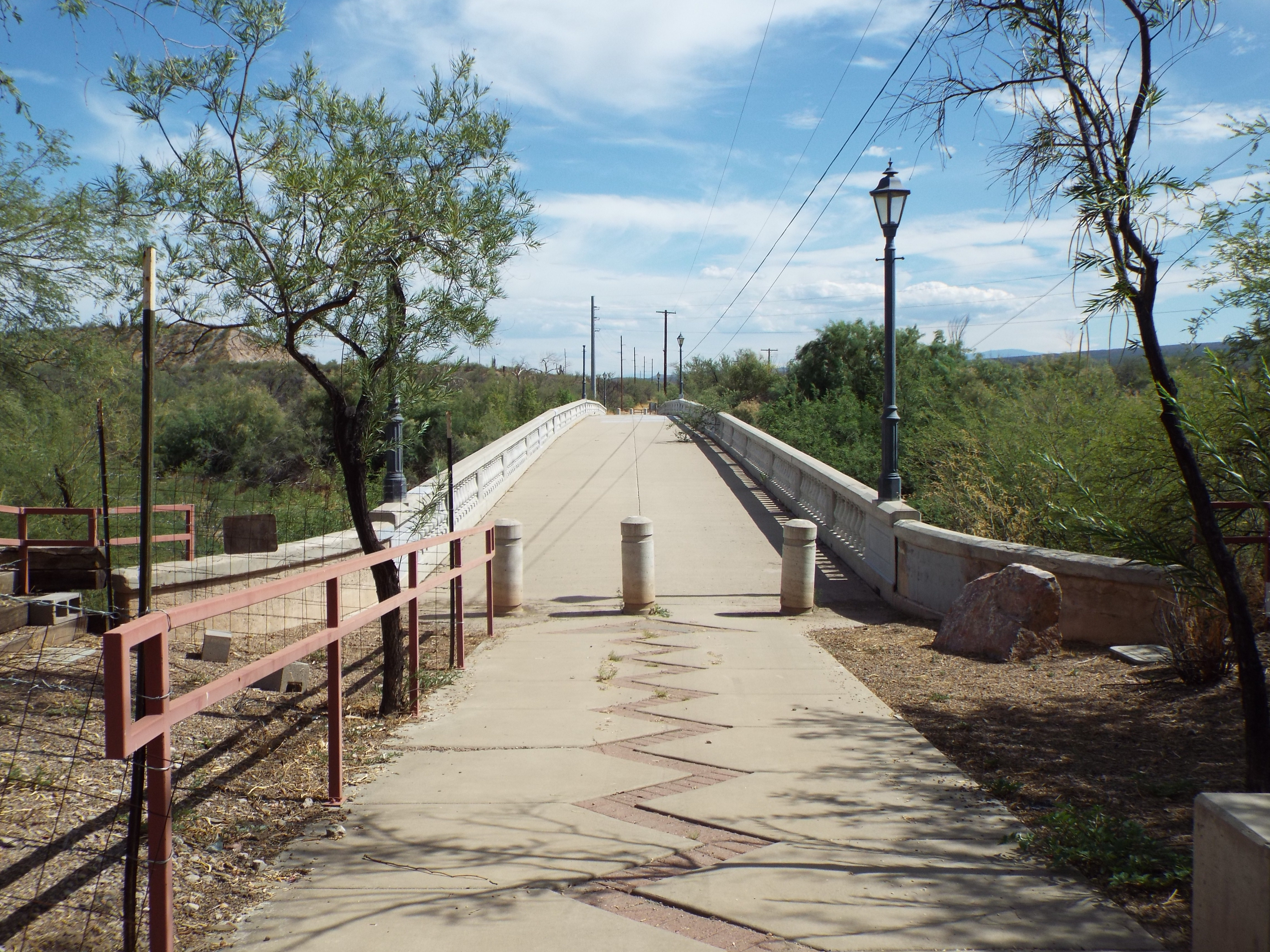
Winkelman Luten Bridge built in 1916

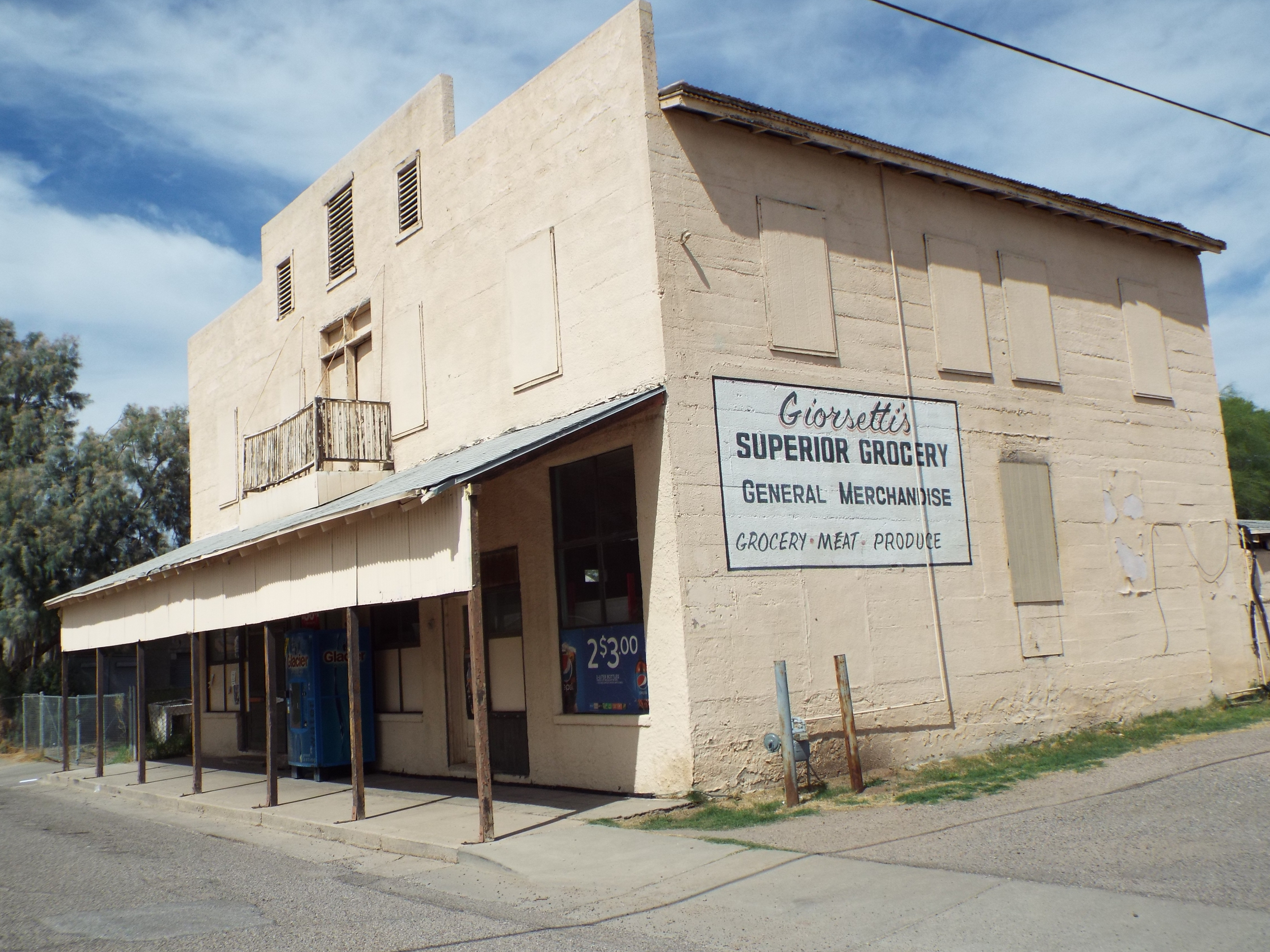
Giorsetti’s Grocery -1910

== See also ==
- List of cities and towns in Arizona
- Coolidge Dam flood of 1993
