= Kearny Airport (Arizona) =

Airport in Pinal County

- IATA: none; ICAO: none; FAA LID: E67

Summary
- Airport type: Public
- Owner/Operator: Town of Kearny
- Serves: Kearny, Arizona
- Elevation AMSL: 1,833 ft (559 m)
- Coordinates: 33.0474°N 110.9091°W

Map
- Location within Arizona Location within the United States

Runways
Direction	Length		Surface
Direction	ft	m	Surface
8/26	3,400	1,036	Concrete
- Source: Federal Aviation Administration

Kearny Airport (FAA LID: E67), sometimes called Kearny Municipal Airport, is a public-use airport located 1 mile (0.87 nmi; 1.6 km) south of the Central business district of Kearny, in Pinal County, Arizona, United States. In 2003 the airport received the Arizona Department of Transportation's Airport of the Year award.

== Facilities and aircraft ==
Kearny Airport covers an area of 20 acres (8.1 ha) at an elevation of 1,833 feet (559 m) above mean sea level. It has one runway:

- Runway 8/26 is 3,400 feet (1,000 m) by 60 feet (18 m) with an asphalt surface.

For the 12-month period ending April 22, 2008, the airport had 2,400 general aviation aircraft operations, an average of seven per day. At that time there were four aircraft based at this airport: three single-engine and one ultralight.

== See also ==
- List of airports in Arizona
