= Sonora, Arizona =

Former community in Pinal County, Arizona

- Location within the state of Arizona Sonora (the United States)
- Coordinates: 33°09′55″N 110°59′45″W
- Country: United States
- State: Arizona
- County: Pinal
- Elevation: 2,293 ft (699 m)
- Time zone: UTC-7 (Mountain (MST))
  - Summer (DST): UTC-7 (MST)
- Area code: 520
- FIPS code: 04-68290
- GNIS feature ID: 11551

Sonora was a community in Pinal County, Arizona, until its residents were moved to Kearny, Arizona and the site was demolished to expand the Ray mine. It has an estimated elevation of 2,293 feet (699 m) above sea level.
