= List of municipalities in Arizona =

Map of the United States with Arizona highlighted

Arizona municipalities

Arizona is a state located in the Western United States. According to the 2020 United States census, Arizona is the 14th most populous state with 7,151,502 inhabitants (as of the 2020 census) and the 6th largest by land area spanning 113,623.1 square miles (294,282 km^{2}). Arizona is divided into 15 counties and contains 92 incorporated cities and towns. Incorporated places in Arizona are those that have been granted home rule, possessing a local government in the form of a city or town council. Most of the population is concentrated within the Phoenix metropolitan area, with a 2020 census population of 4,845,832 (67.8% of the state population).

Phoenix is the capital and largest city by population in Arizona with 1,608,139 residents, is ranked as the fifth most populous city in the United States, and land area spanning 517.5 mi^{2} (1,340 km^{2}) as of the 2020 census. The smallest municipality by population and land area is Winkelman with 296 residents in 0.75 mi^{2} (1.9 km^{2}). The oldest incorporated place in Arizona is Tucson which incorporated in 1877 and the most recent was the town of San Tan Valley which incorporated in September 2025.

== Municipal incorporation ==
The Arizona Constitution has, since its ratification in 1912, allowed for the creation of municipal corporations in any community with a population of 3,500 or greater. According to the Constitution, a municipal charter cannot be created by special laws or by the legislature, but rather by the communities themselves as provided by general law. The population limit specified by the constitution was lowered by state law to a minimum of population of 1,500 for most locations, and further reduced to 500 for communities located within 10 miles (16 km) of a national park or national monument. State law further restricts the incorporation of new municipalities within urbanized areas, which are defined as a specific buffer zone surrounding existing cities and towns.

State law allows for the incorporation of a community as either a city or a town; the only additional requirement to incorporate as a city is a minimum population of 3,000. Cities and towns in Arizona function largely in an identical manner, but cities are provided with additional powers that a town charter does not provide, limited primarily to certain powers regarding the regulation of utilities and construction within the city limits. State law allows adjoining towns to merge and it allows a city to annex a town, but it does not allow cities to merge. Additionally, a town may change its form of government to a city upon reaching the minimum population of 3,000. There are, however, large communities that have remained incorporated as a town in spite of attaining a large population; Gilbert, with 267,918 residents, remains incorporated as a town.

Twenty Arizona municipalities were incorporated before 1912, when the state was admitted to the Union. As such, these cities and towns were incorporated by means other than those stipulated by current state law and the constitution. Phoenix, for example, was incorporated in 1881 by an act of the Territorial Legislature.

== List of cities and towns ==
Largest cities and towns in Arizona by population

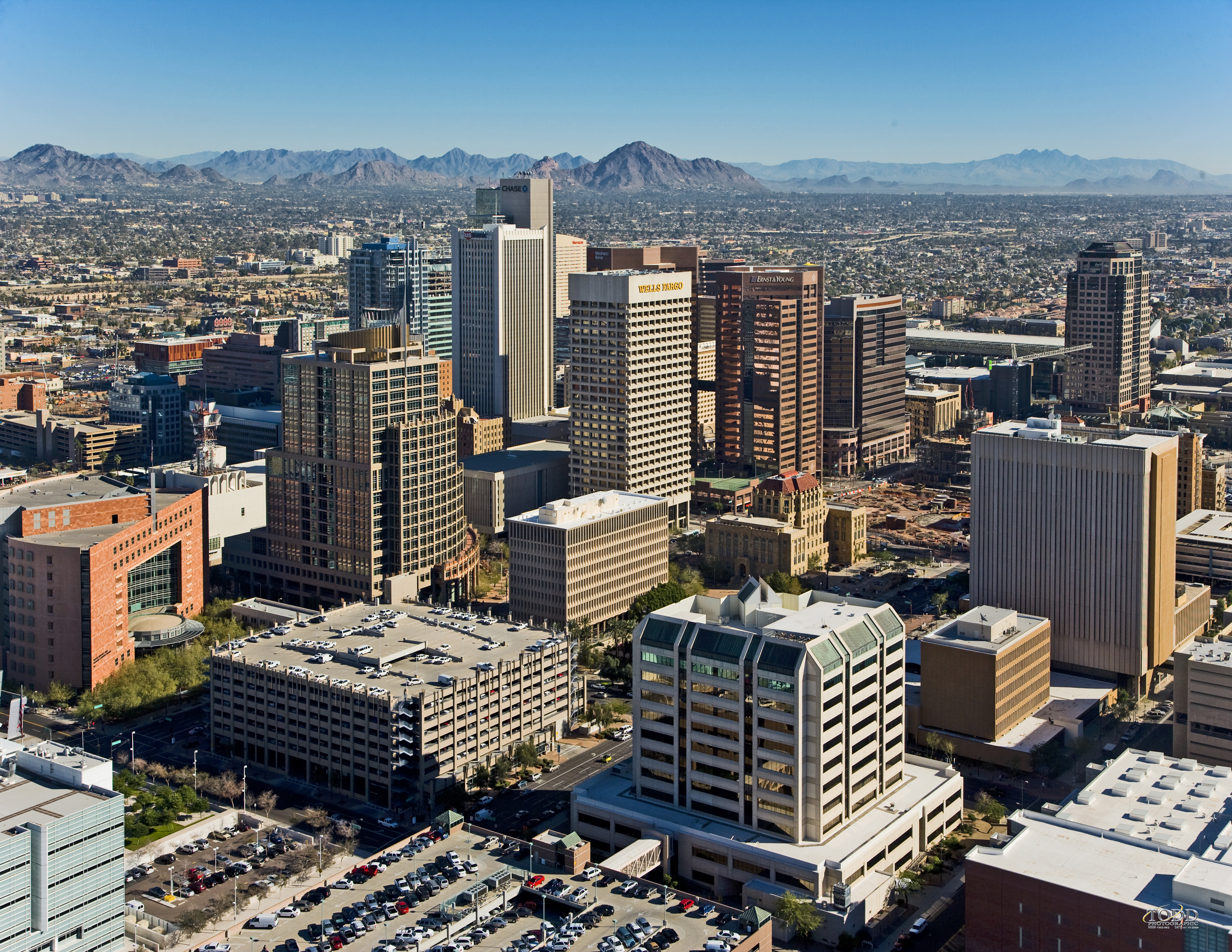
Phoenix, Arizona's state capital and most populous municipality

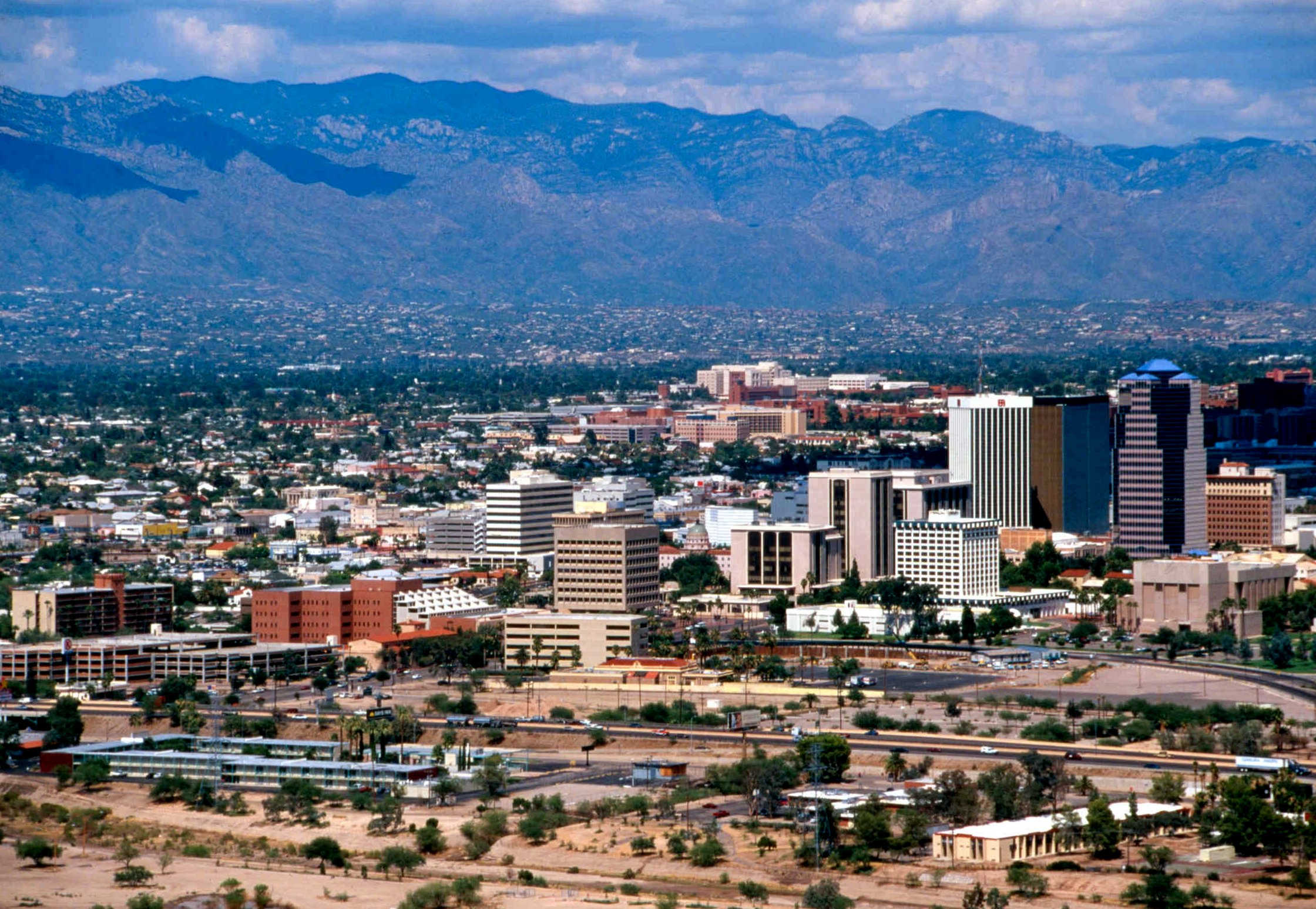
Tucson, Arizona's second largest city by population

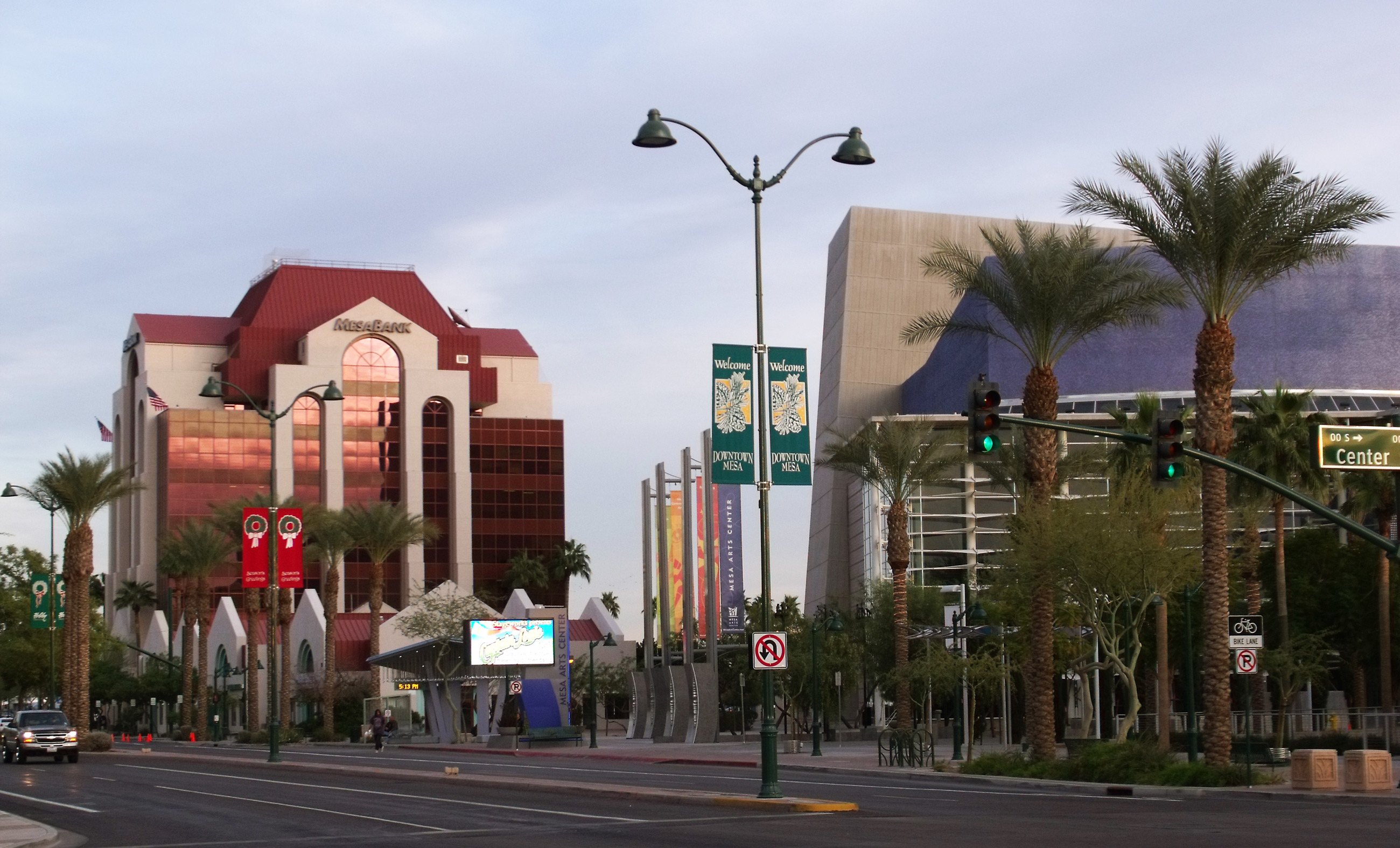
Mesa, a suburb of Phoenix and Arizona's third largest city by population

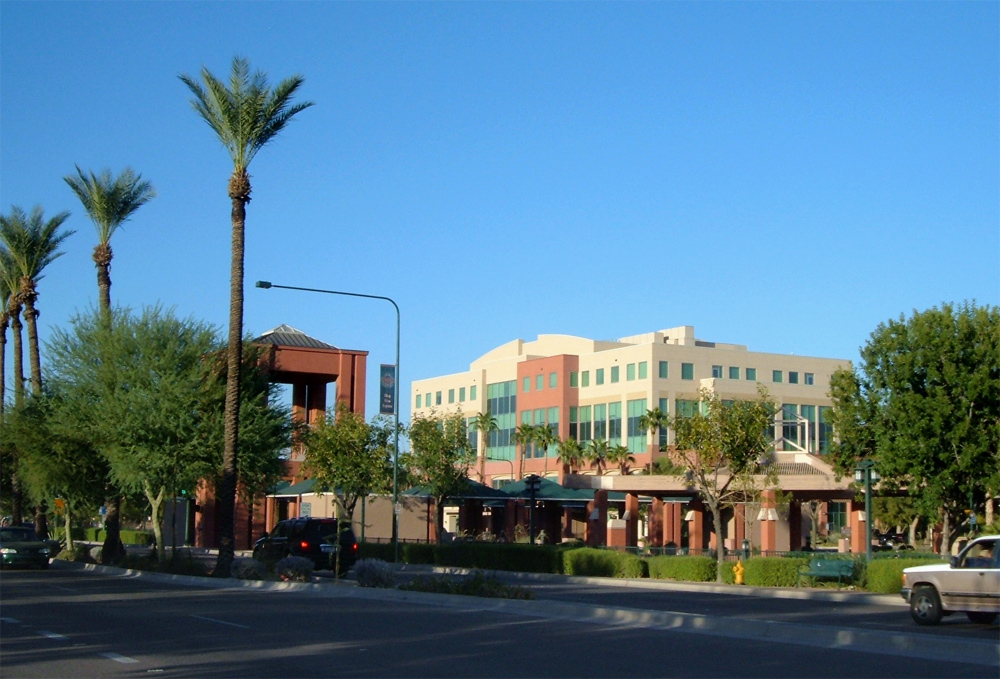
Chandler, a suburb of Phoenix and Arizona's fourth largest city by population

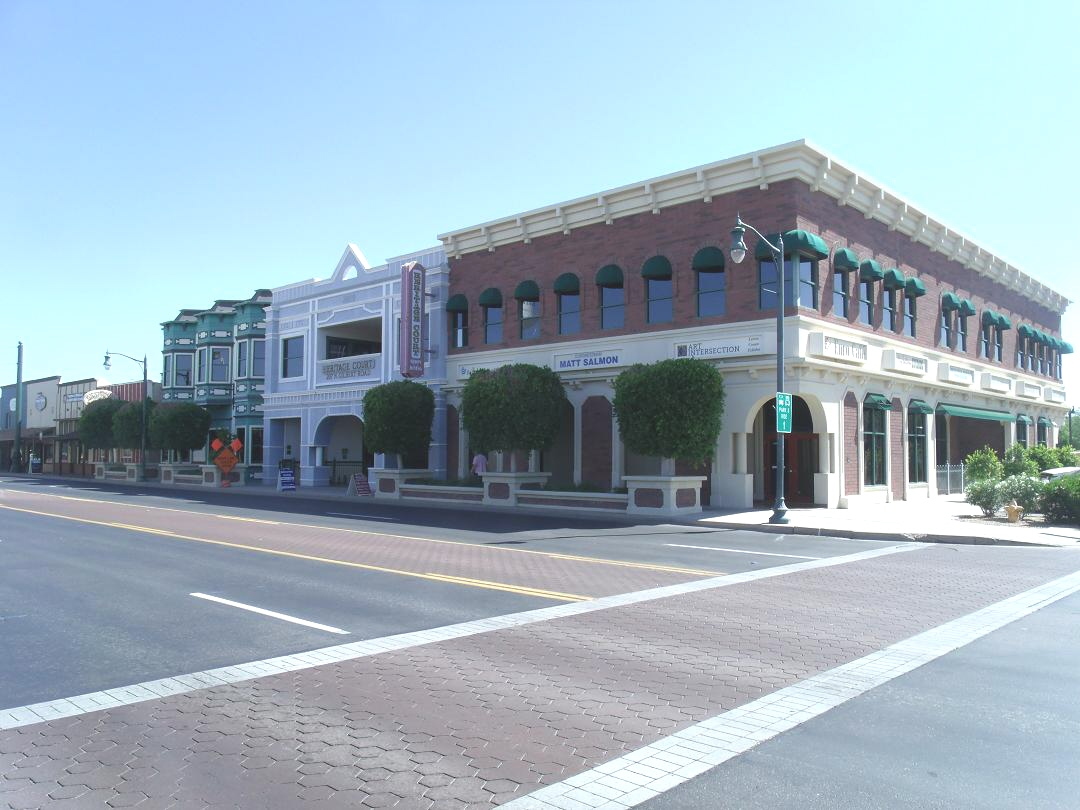
Gilbert, a suburb of Phoenix and Arizona's largest town and fifth largest municipality by population

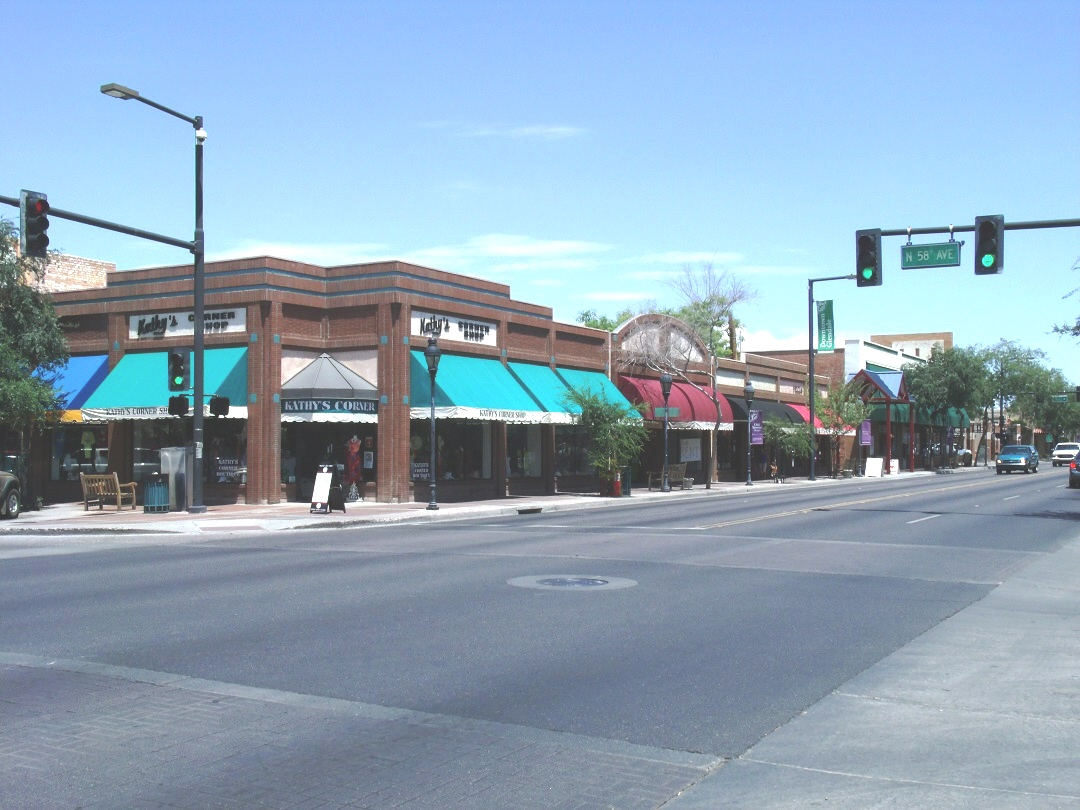
Glendale, a suburb of Phoenix and Arizona's sixth largest city by population

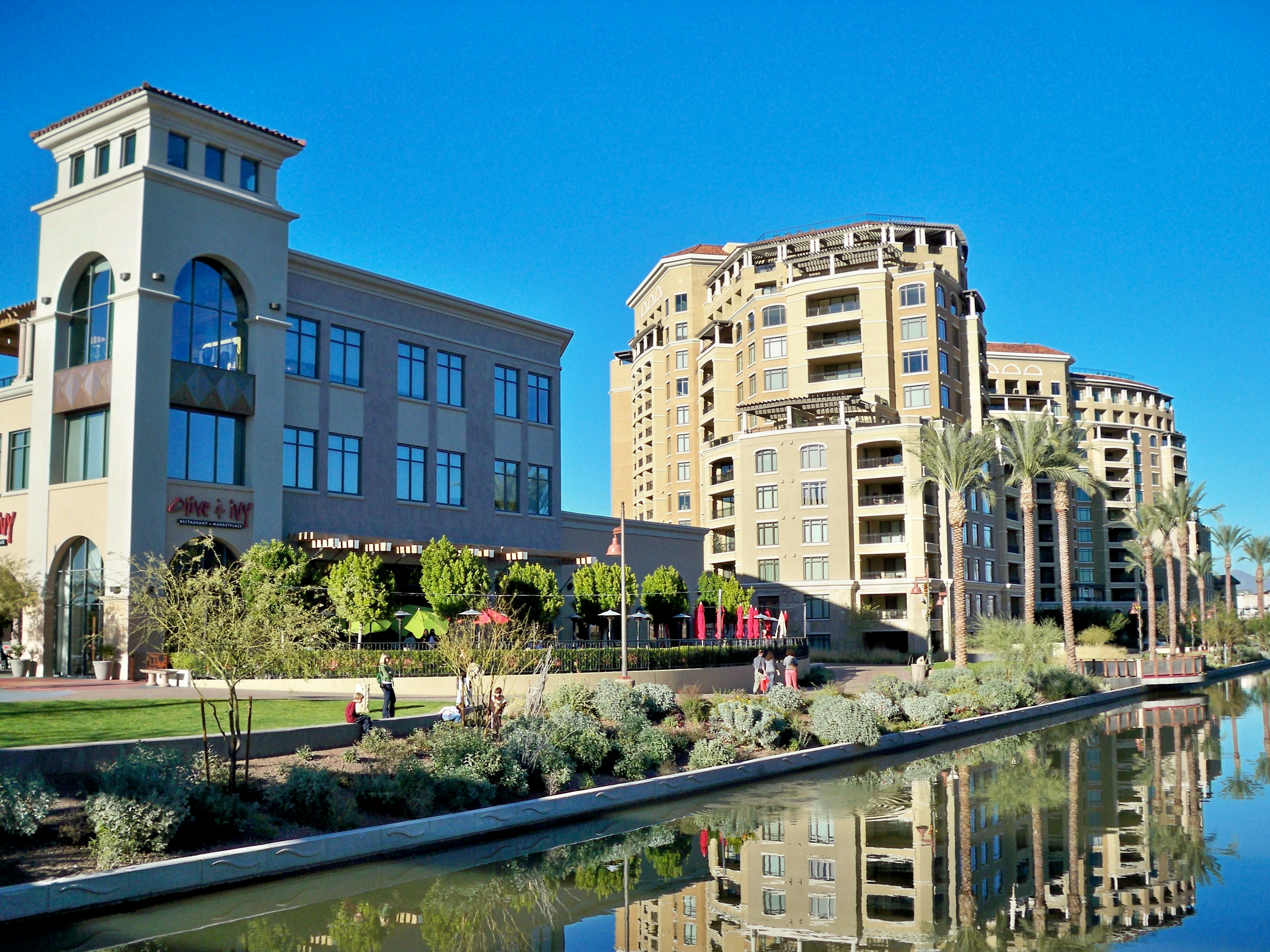
Scottsdale, a suburb of Phoenix and Arizona's seventh largest city by population

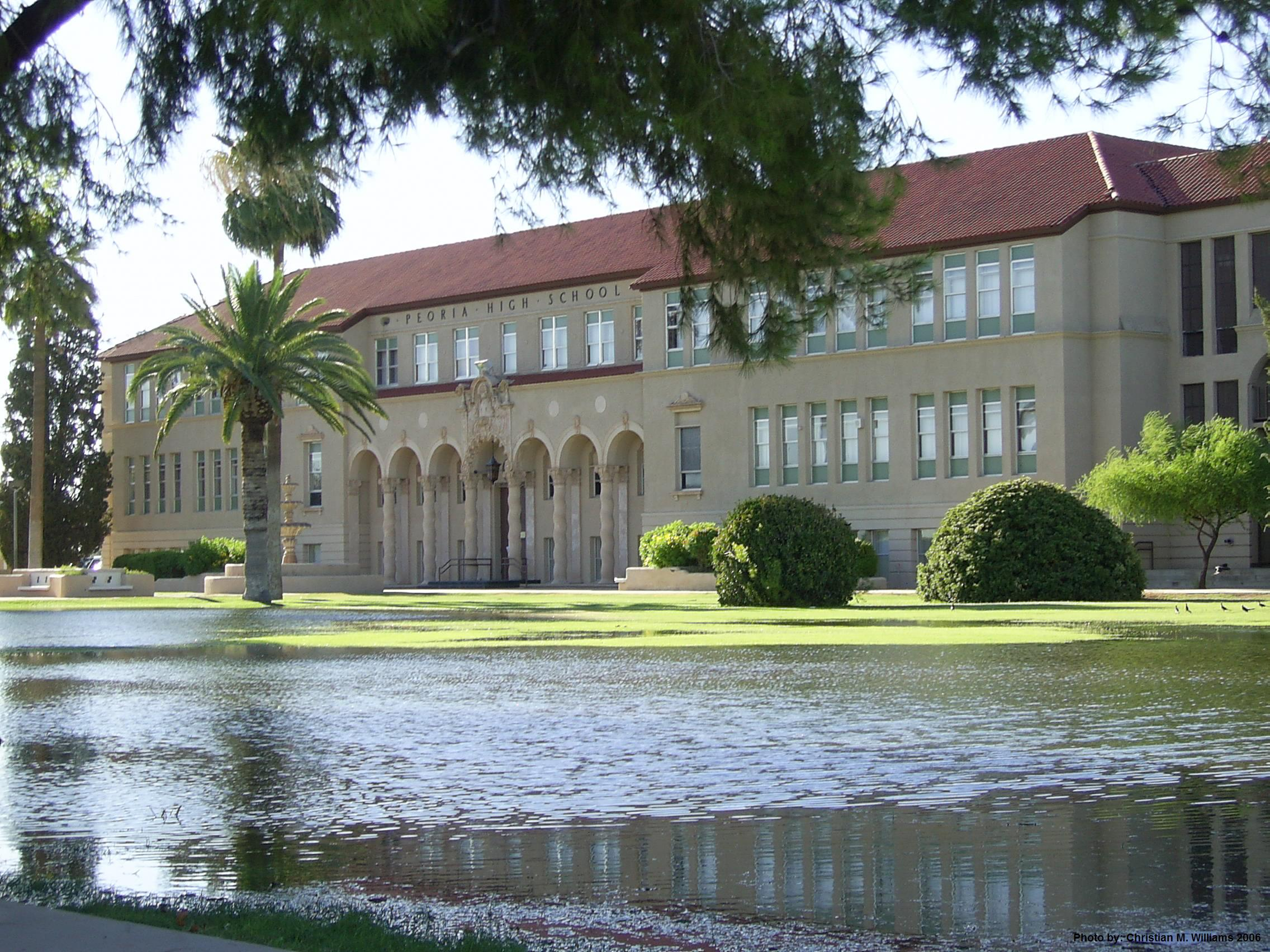
Peoria, a suburb of Phoenix and Arizona's eighth largest city by population

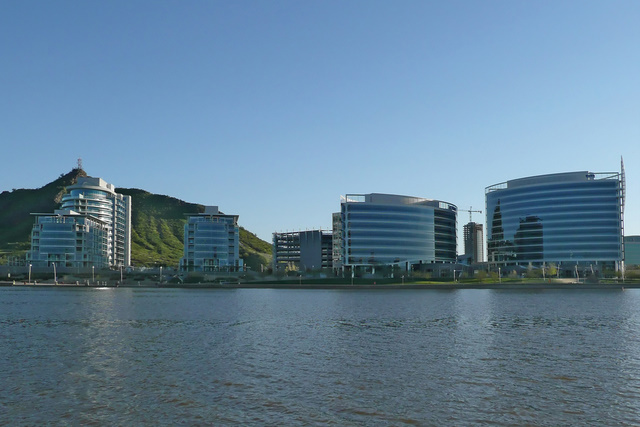
Tempe, a suburb of Phoenix and Arizona's ninth largest city by population

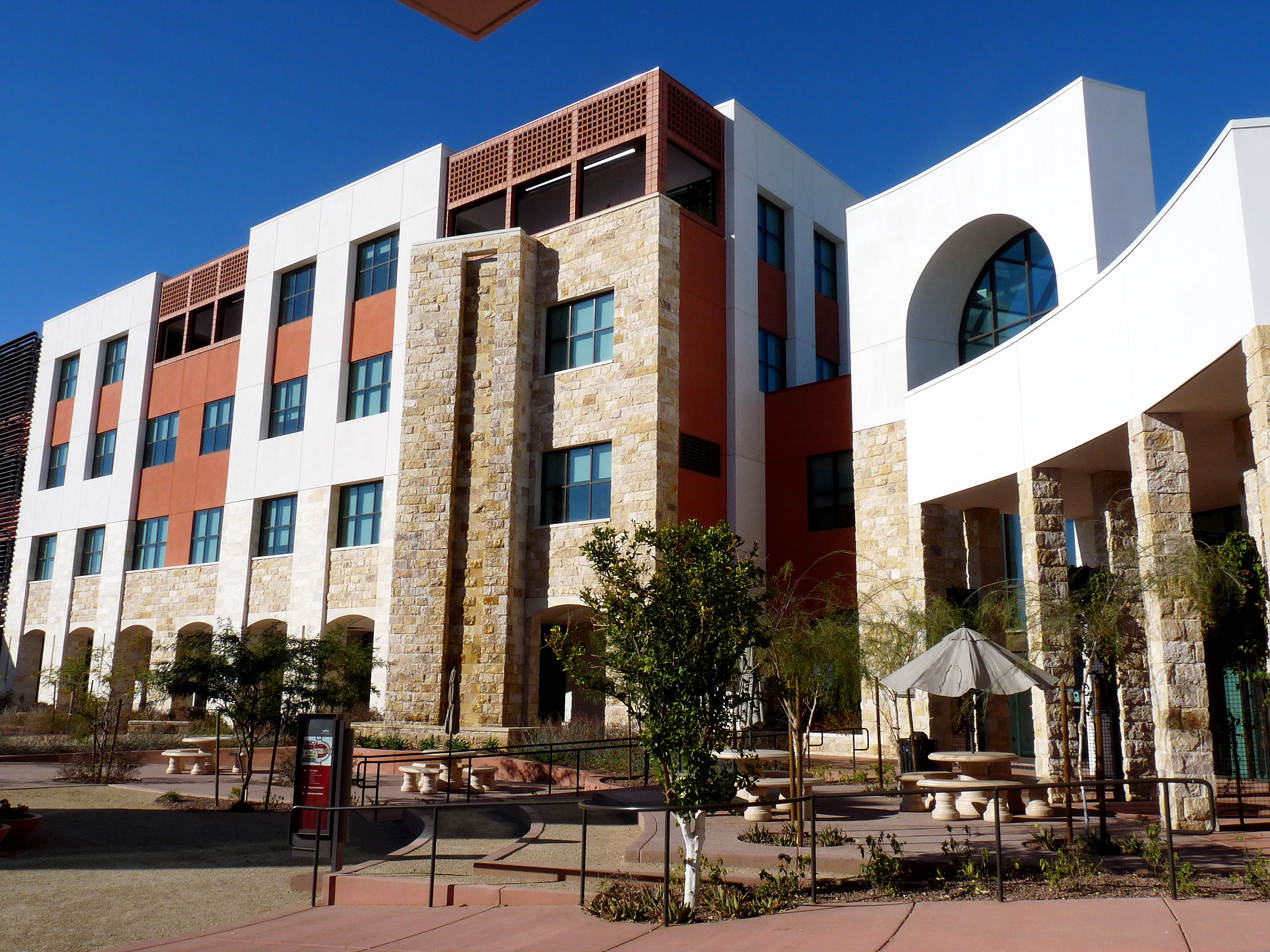
Surprise, a suburb of Phoenix and Arizona's tenth largest city by population

† County seat

‡ State capital and county seat

Name	Type	County	Population (2020)	Population (2010)	Change	Land area (2020)		Population density (2020)	Incorporation year
Name	Type	County	Population (2020)	Population (2010)	Change	sq mi	km^{2}	Population density (2020)	Incorporation year
Apache Junction	City	Pinal, Maricopa	38,499	35,840	+7.4%	35.07	90.8	1,097.8/sq mi (423.9/km^{2})	1978
Avondale	City	Maricopa	89,334	76,238	+17.2%	47.28	122.5	1,889.5/sq mi (729.5/km^{2})	1946
Benson	City	Cochise	5,355	5,105	+4.9%	41.64	107.8	128.6/sq mi (49.7/km^{2})	1924
Bisbee†	City	Cochise	4,923	5,575	−11.7%	5.18	13.4	950.4/sq mi (366.9/km^{2})	1902
Buckeye	City	Maricopa	91,502	50,876	+79.9%	392.98	1,017.8	232.8/sq mi (89.9/km^{2})	1929
Bullhead City	City	Mohave	41,348	39,540	+4.6%	59.37	153.8	696.4/sq mi (268.9/km^{2})	1984
Camp Verde	Town	Yavapai	12,147	10,873	+11.7%	42.35	109.7	286.8/sq mi (110.7/km^{2})	1986
Carefree	Town	Maricopa	3,690	3,363	+9.7%	8.81	22.8	418.8/sq mi (161.7/km^{2})	1984
Casa Grande	City	Pinal	53,658	48,571	+10.5%	110.87	287.2	484.0/sq mi (186.9/km^{2})	1915
Cave Creek	Town	Maricopa	4,892	5,015	−2.5%	37.71	97.7	129.7/sq mi (50.1/km^{2})	1986
Chandler	City	Maricopa	275,987	236,123	+16.9%	65.30	169.1	4,226.4/sq mi (1,631.8/km^{2})	1920
Chino Valley	Town	Yavapai	13,020	10,817	+20.4%	62.42	161.7	208.6/sq mi (80.5/km^{2})	1970
Clarkdale	Town	Yavapai	4,424	4,097	+8.0%	10.18	26.4	434.6/sq mi (167.8/km^{2})	1957
Clifton†	Town	Greenlee	3,933	3,311	+18.8%	14.62	37.9	269.0/sq mi (103.9/km^{2})	1909
Colorado City	Town	Mohave	2,478	4,821	−48.6%	9.20	23.8	269.3/sq mi (104.0/km^{2})	1985
Coolidge	City	Pinal	13,218	11,825	+11.8%	76.27	197.5	173.3/sq mi (66.9/km^{2})	1945
Cottonwood	City	Yavapai	12,029	11,265	+6.8%	16.60	43.0	724.6/sq mi (279.8/km^{2})	1960
Dewey-Humboldt	Town	Yavapai	4,326	3,894	+11.1%	18.79	48.7	230.2/sq mi (88.9/km^{2})	2004
Douglas	City	Cochise	16,534	17,378	−4.9%	9.98	25.8	1,656.7/sq mi (639.7/km^{2})	1905
Duncan	Town	Greenlee	694	696	−0.3%	2.15	5.6	322.8/sq mi (124.6/km^{2})	1938
Eagar	Town	Apache	4,395	4,885	−10.0%	11.58	30.0	379.5/sq mi (146.5/km^{2})	1948
El Mirage	City	Maricopa	35,805	31,797	+12.6%	9.90	25.6	3,616.7/sq mi (1,396.4/km^{2})	1951
Eloy	City	Pinal	15,635	16,631	−6.0%	113.57	294.1	137.7/sq mi (53.2/km^{2})	1949
Flagstaff†	City	Coconino	76,831	65,870	+16.6%	66.03	171.0	1,163.6/sq mi (449.3/km^{2})	1894
Florence†	Town	Pinal	26,785	25,536	+4.9%	62.62	162.2	427.7/sq mi (165.2/km^{2})	1908
Fountain Hills	Town	Maricopa	23,820	22,489	+5.9%	20.28	52.5	1,174.6/sq mi (453.5/km^{2})	1989
Fredonia	Town	Coconino	1,323	1,314	+0.7%	8.88	23.0	149.0/sq mi (57.5/km^{2})	1956
Gila Bend	Town	Maricopa	1,892	1,922	−1.6%	64.37	166.7	29.4/sq mi (11.3/km^{2})	1962
Gilbert	Town	Maricopa	267,918	208,453	+28.5%	68.57	177.6	3,907.2/sq mi (1,508.6/km^{2})	1920
Glendale	City	Maricopa	248,325	226,721	+9.5%	61.60	159.5	4,031.3/sq mi (1,556.5/km^{2})	1910
Globe†	City	Gila	7,249	7,532	−3.8%	18.26	47.3	397.0/sq mi (153.3/km^{2})	1907
Goodyear	City	Maricopa	95,294	65,275	+46.0%	191.30	495.5	498.1/sq mi (192.3/km^{2})	1946
Guadalupe	Town	Maricopa	5,322	5,523	−3.6%	0.80	2.1	6,652.5/sq mi (2,568.5/km^{2})	1975
Hayden	Town	Gila, Pinal	512	662	−22.7%	1.27	3.3	403.1/sq mi (155.7/km^{2})	1956
Holbrook†	City	Navajo	4,858	5,053	−3.9%	17.34	44.9	280.2/sq mi (108.2/km^{2})	1917
Huachuca City	Town	Cochise	1,626	1,853	−12.3%	2.83	7.3	574.6/sq mi (221.8/km^{2})	1958
Jerome	Town	Yavapai	464	444	+4.5%	0.79	2.0	587.3/sq mi (226.8/km^{2})	1889
Kearny	Town	Pinal	1,741	1,950	−10.7%	2.70	7.0	644.8/sq mi (249.0/km^{2})	1959
Kingman†	City	Mohave	32,689	28,068	+16.5%	37.55	97.3	870.5/sq mi (336.1/km^{2})	1952
Lake Havasu City	City	Mohave	57,144	52,527	+8.8%	46.34	120.0	1,233.1/sq mi (476.1/km^{2})	1978
Litchfield Park	City	Maricopa	6,847	5,476	+25.0%	3.28	8.5	2,087.5/sq mi (806.0/km^{2})	1987
Mammoth	Town	Pinal	1,076	1,426	−24.5%	26.32	68.2	40.9/sq mi (15.8/km^{2})	1958
Marana	Town	Pima, Pinal	51,908	34,961	+48.5%	121.10	313.6	428.6/sq mi (165.5/km^{2})	1977
Maricopa	City	Pinal	58,125	43,482	+33.7%	42.46	110.0	1,368.9/sq mi (528.5/km^{2})	2003
Mesa	City	Maricopa	504,258	439,041	+14.9%	138.70	359.2	3,635.6/sq mi (1,403.7/km^{2})	1883
Miami	Town	Gila	1,541	1,837	−16.1%	0.89	2.3	1,731.5/sq mi (668.5/km^{2})	1918
Nogales†	City	Santa Cruz	19,770	20,837	−5.1%	20.82	53.9	949.6/sq mi (366.6/km^{2})	1893
Oro Valley	Town	Pima	47,070	41,011	+14.8%	34.87	90.3	1,349.9/sq mi (521.2/km^{2})	1974
Page	City	Coconino	7,440	7,247	+2.7%	38.18	98.9	194.9/sq mi (75.2/km^{2})	1975
Paradise Valley	Town	Maricopa	12,658	12,820	−1.3%	15.38	39.8	823.0/sq mi (317.8/km^{2})	1961
Parker†	Town	La Paz	3,417	3,083	+10.8%	21.98	56.9	155.5/sq mi (60.0/km^{2})	1948
Patagonia	Town	Santa Cruz	804	913	−11.9%	1.29	3.3	623.3/sq mi (240.6/km^{2})	1948
Payson	Town	Gila	16,351	15,301	+6.9%	19.35	50.1	845.0/sq mi (326.3/km^{2})	1973
Peoria	City	Maricopa, Yavapai	190,985	154,065	+24.0%	176.08	456.0	1,084.6/sq mi (418.8/km^{2})	1954
Phoenix‡	City	Maricopa	1,608,139	1,445,632	+11.2%	518.00	1,341.6	3,104.5/sq mi (1,198.7/km^{2})	1881
Pima	Town	Graham	2,847	2,387	+19.3%	7.30	18.9	390.0/sq mi (150.6/km^{2})	1916
Pinetop-Lakeside	Town	Navajo	4,030	4,282	−5.9%	11.15	28.9	361.4/sq mi (139.6/km^{2})	1984
Prescott†	City	Yavapai	45,827	39,843	+15.0%	44.97	116.5	1,019.1/sq mi (393.5/km^{2})	1883
Prescott Valley	Town	Yavapai	46,785	38,822	+20.5%	40.47	104.8	1,156.0/sq mi (446.4/km^{2})	1978
Quartzsite	Town	La Paz	2,413	3,677	−34.4%	36.30	94.0	66.5/sq mi (25.7/km^{2})	1989
Queen Creek	Town	Maricopa, Pinal	59,519	26,361	+125.8%	40.32	104.4	1,476.2/sq mi (570.0/km^{2})	1989
Safford†	City	Graham	10,129	9,566	+5.9%	9.27	24.0	1,092.7/sq mi (421.9/km^{2})	1901
Sahuarita	Town	Pima	34,134	25,259	+35.1%	31.69	82.1	1,077.1/sq mi (415.9/km^{2})	1994
San Luis	City	Yuma	35,257	25,505	+38.2%	34.03	88.1	1,036.1/sq mi (400.0/km^{2})	1979
San Tan Valley (Note: San Tan Valley incorporated in 2025 and is thus not included in the 2010 or 2020 census.)	Town	Pinal							2025
Scottsdale	City	Maricopa	241,361	217,385	+11.0%	184.00	476.6	1,311.7/sq mi (506.5/km^{2})	1951
Sedona	City	Yavapai, Coconino	9,684	10,031	−3.5%	18.26	47.3	530.3/sq mi (204.8/km^{2})	1988
Show Low	City	Navajo	11,732	10,660	+10.1%	65.50	169.6	179.1/sq mi (69.2/km^{2})	1953
Sierra Vista	City	Cochise	45,308	43,888	+3.2%	152.25	394.3	297.6/sq mi (114.9/km^{2})	1956
Snowflake	Town	Navajo	6,104	5,590	+9.2%	33.74	87.4	180.9/sq mi (69.9/km^{2})	1948
Somerton	City	Yuma	14,197	14,287	−0.6%	7.27	18.8	1,952.8/sq mi (754.0/km^{2})	1918
South Tucson	City	Pima	4,613	5,652	−18.4%	1.03	2.7	4,478.6/sq mi (1,729.2/km^{2})	1940
Springerville	Town	Apache	1,717	1,961	−12.4%	11.50	29.8	149.3/sq mi (57.6/km^{2})	1948
St. Johns†	City	Apache	3,417	3,480	−1.8%	25.91	67.1	131.9/sq mi (50.9/km^{2})	1946
Star Valley	Town	Gila	2,484	1,970	+26.1%	36.14	93.6	68.7/sq mi (26.5/km^{2})	2005
Superior	Town	Pinal	2,407	2,837	−15.2%	1.96	5.1	1,228.1/sq mi (474.2/km^{2})	1976
Surprise	City	Maricopa	143,148	117,517	+21.8%	110.30	285.7	1,297.8/sq mi (501.1/km^{2})	1960
Taylor	Town	Navajo	3,995	4,112	−2.8%	32.66	84.6	122.3/sq mi (47.2/km^{2})	1966
Tempe	City	Maricopa	180,587	161,719	+11.7%	39.94	103.4	4,521.5/sq mi (1,745.7/km^{2})	1894
Thatcher	Town	Graham	5,231	4,865	+7.5%	6.60	17.1	792.6/sq mi (306.0/km^{2})	1899
Tolleson	City	Maricopa	7,216	6,545	+10.3%	5.73	14.8	1,259.3/sq mi (486.2/km^{2})	1929
Tombstone	City	Cochise	1,308	1,380	−5.2%	9.25	24.0	141.4/sq mi (54.6/km^{2})	1881
Tucson†	City	Pima	542,629	520,116	+4.3%	240.99	624.2	2,251.7/sq mi (869.4/km^{2})	1877
Tusayan (Note: Because Tusayan was incorporated in 2010, its population was not included in the 2010 Census. The 2010 Census count for the now defunct Tusayan CDP was 558.)	Town	Coconino	603	558	+8.1%	16.83	43.6 (Note: Because the Tusayan was incorporated after the 2010 Census, its area is not reported by the Census Bureau. The 2010 area of the Census-designated place corresponding to Tusayan was 8.91 sq mi (23.1 km^{2}). At its incorporation, Tusayan included an area of only 0.2 sq mi (0.52 km^{2}), much smaller than its CDP counterpart.)	35.8/sq mi (13.8/km^{2})	2010
Wellton	Town	Yuma	2,375	2,882	−17.6%	28.88	74.8	82.2/sq mi (31.8/km^{2})	1970
Wickenburg	Town	Maricopa, Yavapai	7,474	6,363	+17.5%	25.86	67.0	289.0/sq mi (111.6/km^{2})	1909
Willcox	City	Cochise	3,213	3,757	−14.5%	6.15	15.9	522.4/sq mi (201.7/km^{2})	1915
Williams	City	Coconino	3,202	3,023	+5.9%	43.83	113.5	73.1/sq mi (28.2/km^{2})	1901
Winkelman	Town	Gila, Pinal	296	353	−16.1%	0.77	2.0	384.4/sq mi (148.4/km^{2})	1949
Winslow	City	Navajo	9,005	9,655	−6.7%	12.99	33.6	693.2/sq mi (267.7/km^{2})	1900
Youngtown	Town	Maricopa	7,056	6,156	+14.6%	1.49	3.9	4,735.6/sq mi (1,828.4/km^{2})	1960
Yuma†	City	Yuma	95,548	93,064	+2.7%	120.67	312.5	791.8/sq mi (305.7/km^{2})	1914
Total municipalities	—	—	5,728,859	5,022,368	+14.1%	4,548.05	11,779.4	1,259.6/sq mi (486.3/km^{2})	—
State of Arizona	—	—	7,151,502	6,392,017	+11.9%	113,623.1	294,282	62.9/sq mi (24.3/km^{2})	—

== See also ==
- List of counties in Arizona
- List of Indian reservations in Arizona
- List of census-designated places in Arizona
