= Hayden-Winkelman Unified School District =

School district in Gila County, Arizona

Location
- Gila County, Arizona United States

District information
- Grades: Preschool-12
- Established: 1936
- Superintendent: Jeff Gregorich
- Schools: 3

Students and staff
- Students: 420

Other information
- Website: www.hwusd.org

The Hayden-Winkelman School District is located in southern Gila County, Arizona. The system has 420 students, in a high school (Hayden High School), a middle school, and an elementary school. The Hayden-Winkelman School District Mascot is the lobos
