= Ray High School (Arizona) =

Coordinates: 33.065151°N 110.914012°W

Location
- 701 N. Hwy 177; Kearny, Arizona 85137; United States

Information
- School type: Public high school
- School district: Ray Unified School District
- CEEB code: 030350
- Teaching staff: 15.50 (FTE)
- Grades: 7-12
- Enrollment: 171 (2023–2024)
- Student to teacher ratio: 11.03
- Colors: Maroon and white
- Mascot: Bearcats
- Website: www.rayusd.org

Ray High School is a high school in Kearny, Arizona. It is the only high school under the jurisdiction of the Ray Unified School District, which also operates a primary and elementary school. The high school was originally located in Ray, Arizona but was moved to Kearny, Arizona.
