= Dick Tuck =

American political consultant and prankster (1924–2018)

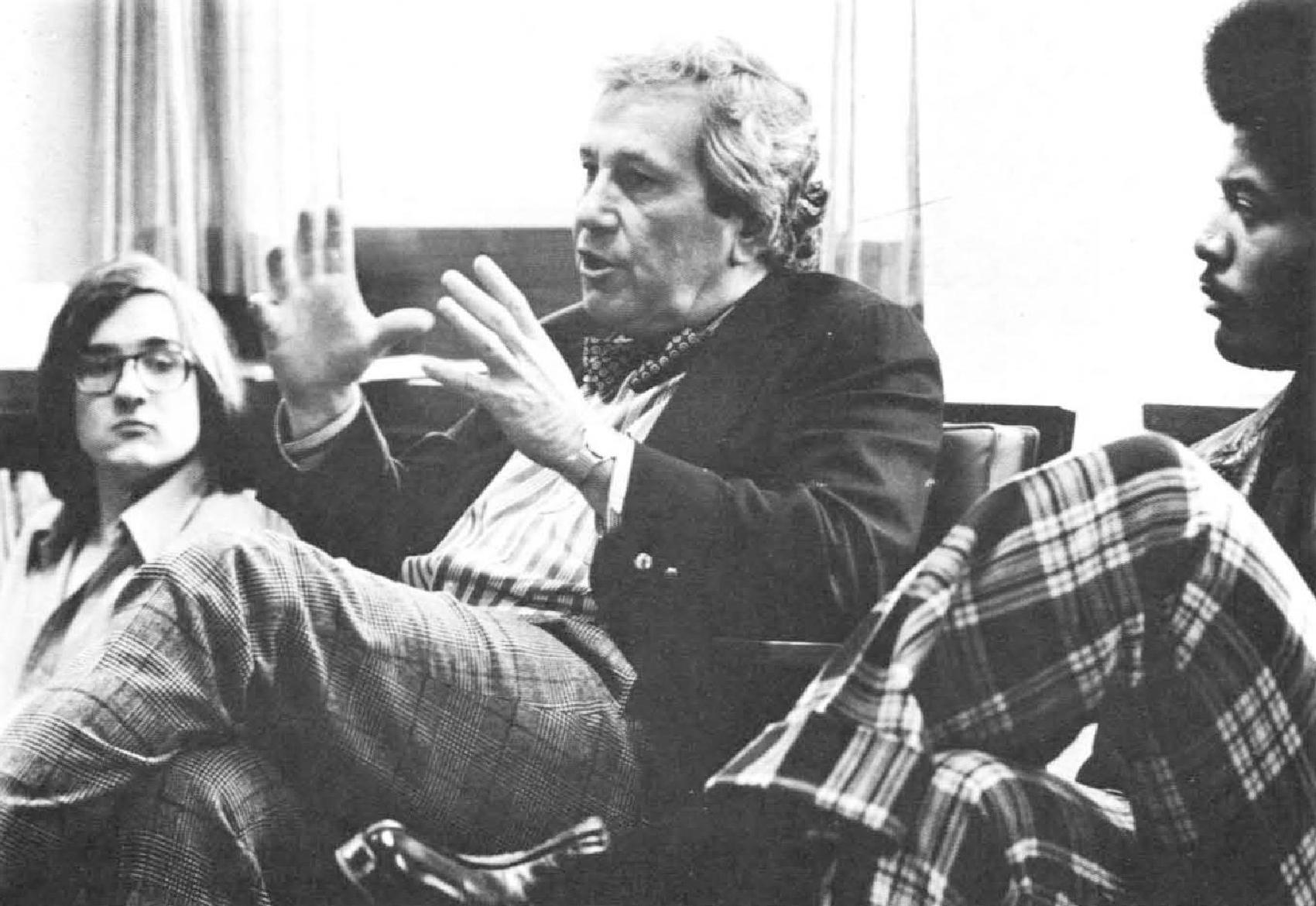
- Dick Tuck in 1974 from The Big T, the yearbook of the California Institute of Technology
- Born: January 25, 1924; Hayden, Arizona, US
- Died: May 28, 2018 (aged 94); Tucson, Arizona, US
- Occupations: Political consultant, campaign strategist, advance man, and political prankster

Richard Gregory Tuck (January 25, 1924 – May 28, 2018) was an American political consultant, campaign strategist, advance man, and political prankster.

== Background ==
Tuck was born in Hayden, Arizona, to Frank Joseph Tuck, a copper mining engineer, and the former (Mary) Olive Sweeney. He served in the United States Marine Corps during World War II, in a bomb disposal unit.

== Pranks ==
Tuck first met Richard Nixon as a student at the University of California, Santa Barbara. In 1950, Tuck was working for Congresswoman Helen Gahagan Douglas, who was running for a seat in the U.S. Senate against Nixon. In a 1973 Time magazine article, Tuck stated, "There was an absent-minded professor who knew I was in politics and forgot the rest. He asked me to advance a Nixon visit." Tuck agreed and launched his first prank against Nixon. He rented a big auditorium, invited only a small number of people, and gave a long-winded speech to introduce the candidate. When Nixon came on stage, Tuck asked him to speak about the International Monetary Fund. When the speech was over, Nixon asked Tuck his name and told him, "Dick Tuck, you've made your last advance."

In 1968, Tuck utilized Republican nominee Nixon's own campaign slogan against him; he hired a heavily pregnant black woman to wander around a Nixon rally in a predominantly white area, wearing a T-shirt that read, "Nixon's the One!"

== Political career ==
In 1966, Tuck ran for the California State Senate. He opened his campaign with a press conference at Forest Lawn Cemetery in Glendale, claiming that just because people had died does not mean they do not still have (voting) rights.

Hearing of Tuck's entry as a candidate, Richard Nixon sent him a congratulatory telegram, including an offer to campaign for him, despite Tuck's being a Democrat.

Dick Tuck designed his campaign billboards to read, in small print, "Dick", and in much larger lettering, "Tuck". The names were printed twice, piggy-backed one above the other. On the eve of the election he drove around the area and painted an extra line on the upper "Tuck" on the billboards. This converted the T in his name to an F so that passersby would see a profane phrase. Tuck said he thought voters would think his opponent had done this and he'd "get the sympathy vote" with this tactic. In a field of eight candidates for the Democratic nomination, Tuck finished third with 5,211 votes (almost 10%), losing to future Congressman George E. Danielson.

As the ballot totals piled against him on election night, the candidate was asked his reaction. Referring to his earlier cemetery speech, Tuck quipped, "Just wait till the dead vote comes in." When defeat became inevitable, Tuck made the now notorious statement, "The people have spoken, the bastards."

Tuck was a key adviser in Robert F. Kennedy's 1968 presidential campaign. After Kennedy was shot in Los Angeles, he rode in Kennedy's ambulance as the mortally wounded candidate was rushed to the hospital.

Richard Nixon obsessed about Tuck, as recorded in his presidential tapes. But Nixon also admired Tuck, comparing his own staffers' exploits unfavorably to Tuck's pranks. After the Watergate scandal became public, H. R. Haldeman, White House Chief of Staff under Nixon, saw Tuck in the Capitol. Haldeman reportedly turned to Tuck and said, "You started all of this." Tuck replied, "Yeah, Bob, but you guys ran it into the ground."

Tuck also served briefly as political editor/adviser to the National Lampoon magazine.

== Controversy ==
Virtually every prank Dick Tuck claimed to have pulled or was associated with has been disputed in some way. Tuck often confessed and later denied his actions. He admitted to making up some of his pranks to author Neil Steinberg, who covered Tuck in his 1992 book If At All Possible, Involve A Cow: The Book of College Pranks.

== Retirement and death ==
In the later years of his life, Tuck lived in retirement in Tucson, Arizona. Tuck died on May 28, 2018, at an assisted living facility in Tucson. He was 94.
