= Ray mine =

Copper mine in Arizona

Ray Copper Mine
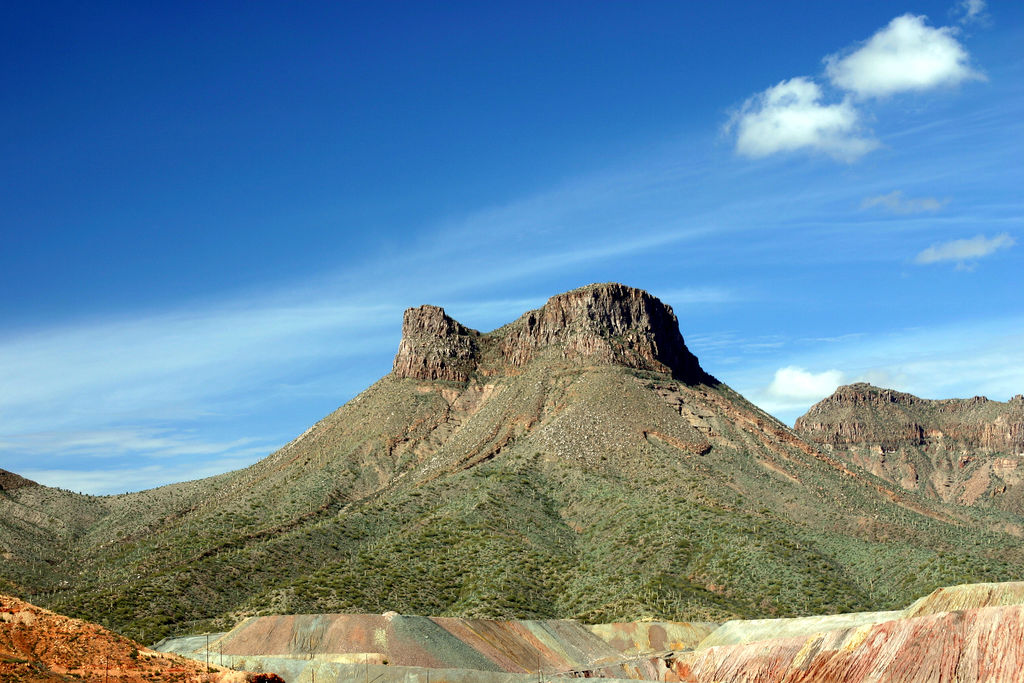
- Teapot mesa, above Ray Mine

- Location in Arizona
- Location: Kearny, Pinal County, Arizona, United States; 33°08′58″N 110°59′14″W
- Products: Copper, sulfuric acid
- Production: 62.0 million lbs copper
- Financial year: 2016
- Opened: 1880
- Company: Asarco
- Website: Ray mine website
- Acquired: 1999

The Ray mine is a large copper mine in Pinal County, Arizona, near the town of Kearny, in the southwestern United States. ASARCO, a subsidiary of Grupo México, currently owns the mine, which it acquired from Kennecott Copper in 1986.

The Ray mine has one of the largest copper reserves in the United States, with proven and probable reserves of 835.7 million tonnes (822,500,000 long tons; 921,200,000 short tons) of ore grading 1.73% copper, as of December 31, 2018. Copper from the Ray mine goes to the Hayden Smelter.

Mineral Creek, a tributary of the Gila River, flows north to south through the Ray Mine property. It is dammed before reaching the mine pit at the north by a double-curvature concrete arch dam, Big Box Canyon Dam, which outlets into an underground tunnel that diverts the creek around the mine pit till it emerges into a concrete channel that connects it to the Gila River, immediately south of the Ray Mine complex. This project was privately built and is maintained by the operators of the mine.

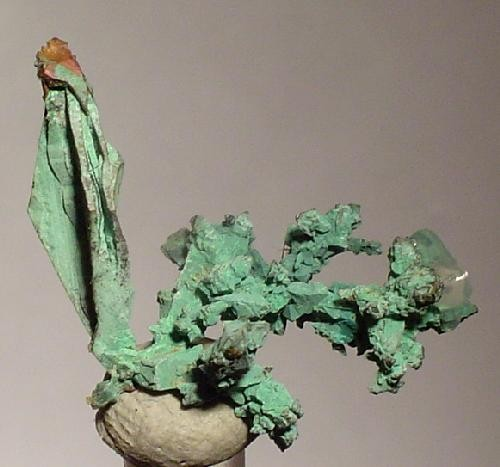
Old specimen of native copper (2.2 cm × 2.2 cm × 1.2 cm (0.87 in × 0.87 in × 0.47 in)) from Ray mine. Large "sail" at left is a spinel twin.

== See also ==
- Ray, Arizona
