= Hayden Smelter =

Copper smelter in Arizona, US

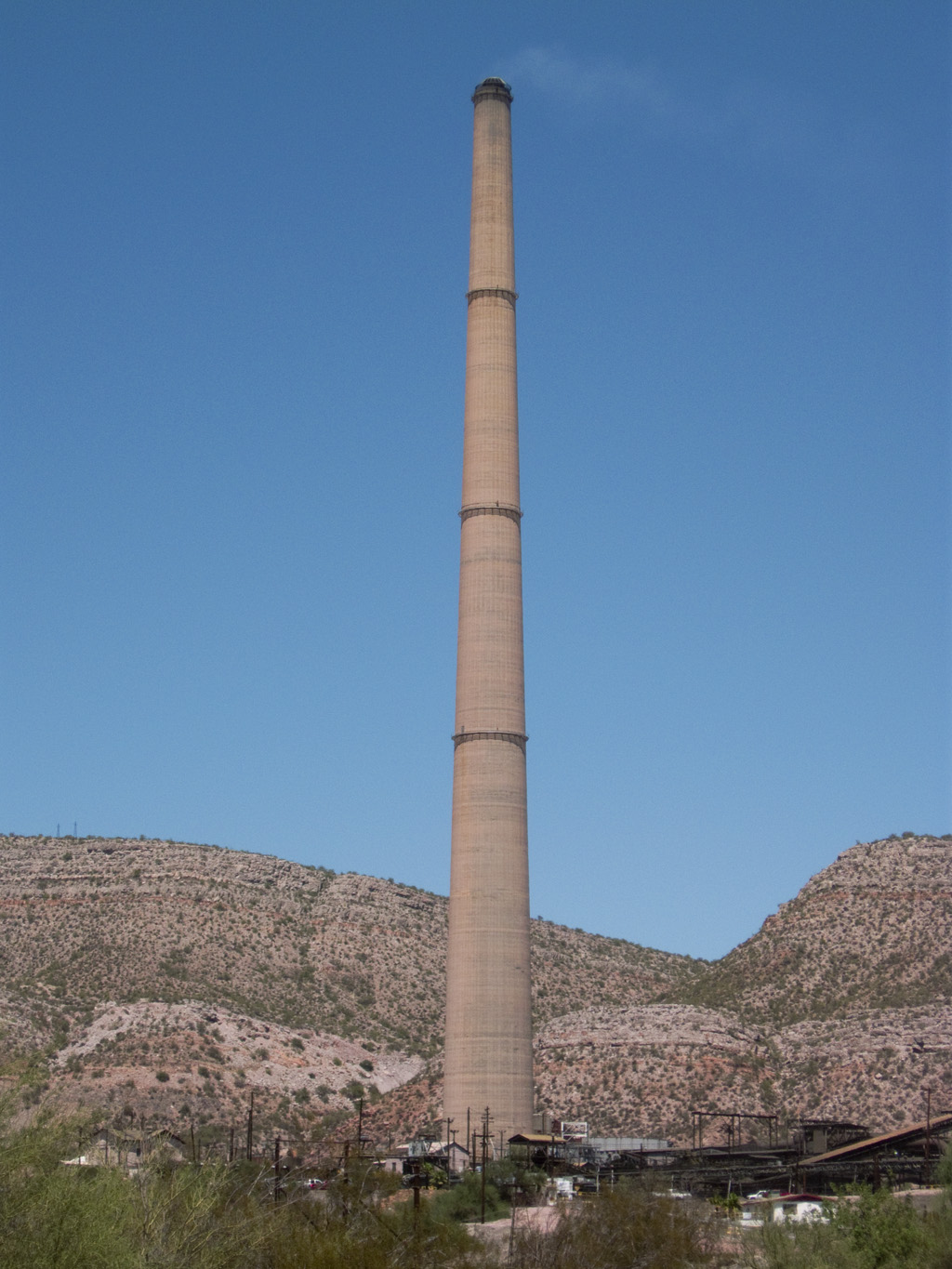
- Close up of Hayden Smelter, 2009

General information
- Status: Operating
- Type: Smelter
- Location: Ray Complex Hayden Smelter P.O. Box 8 640 Asarco Avenue Hayden AZ USA 85235
- Coordinates: 33°0′32″N 110°46′59″W
- Completed: 1984
- Owner: ASARCO

Height
- Height: 303 meters

Website
- https://www.asarco.com/

Hayden Smelter is a copper smelter at Hayden, Arizona, owned and operated by ASARCO. It has a 305 meters (1,001 feet) tall chimney, which is the tallest free-standing structure of Arizona. It processes copper from the Ray mine.

In 2011, the Environmental Protection Agency took action against the smelter for releasing "illegal amounts of lead, arsenic and eight other dangerous compounds."

In 2020, the smelter closed in a labor dispute. It was "mothballed" and remains closed in early 2025. Owner Grupo Mexico has applied for an extension of the smelter's air quality permit. Timing of the reopening, if it occurs, remains uncertain.
