= Hayden, Arizona =

Town in Gila and Pinal Counties, Arizona

- Town
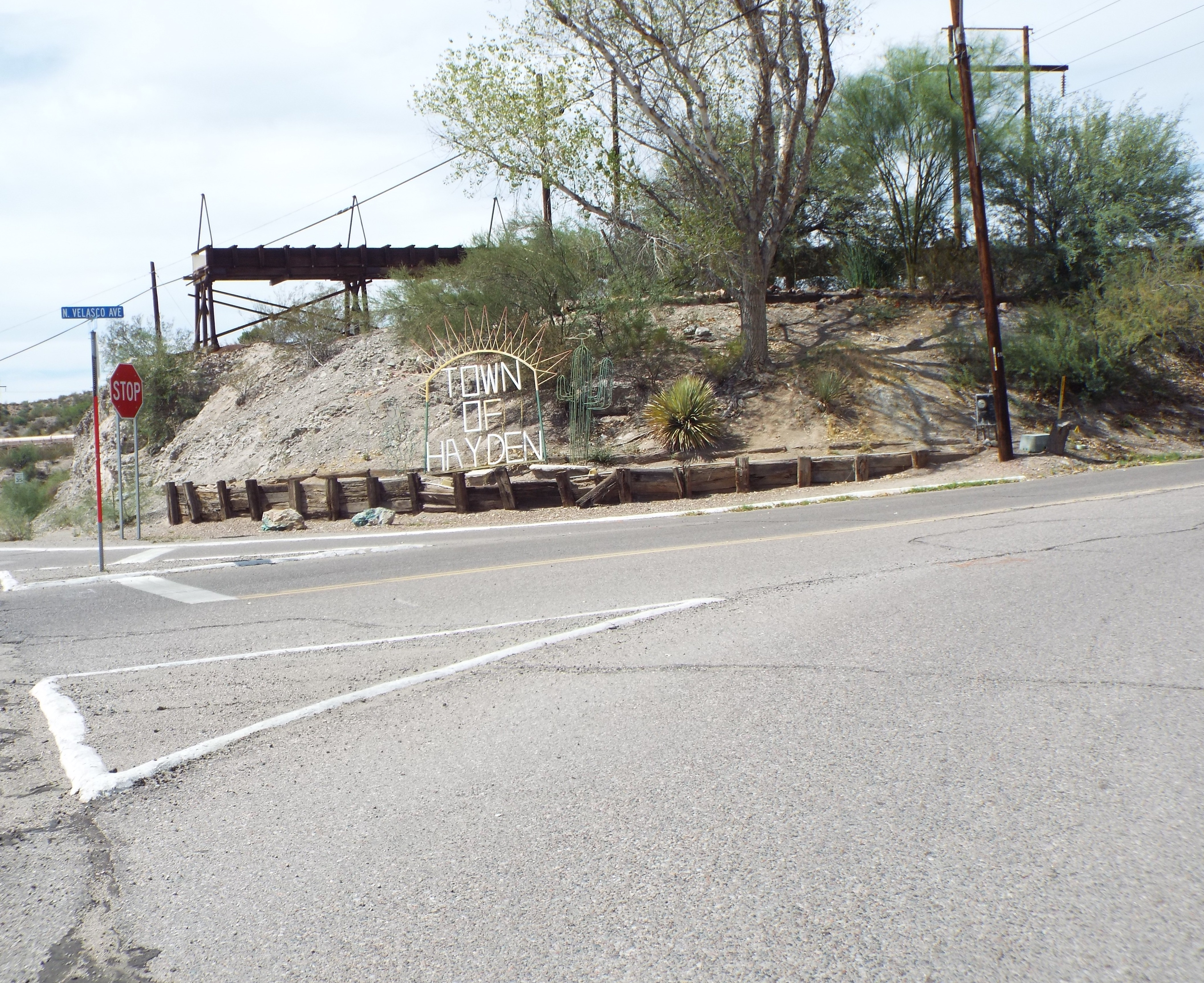
- Welcome to Hayden, August 2019

- Location within Arizona Location within the United States
- Coordinates: 33°00′17″N 110°47′07″W
- Country: United States
- State: Arizona
- County: Gila

Government
  - Mayor: Dean Hetrick

Area
  - Total: 1.27 sq mi (3.30 km^{2})
  - Land: 1.27 sq mi (3.28 km^{2})
  - Water: 0.0077 sq mi (0.02 km^{2})
- Elevation: 2,044 ft (623 m)

Population (2020)
  - Total: 512
  - Density: 404.6/sq mi (156.23/km^{2})
- Time zone: UTC-7 (MST (no DST))
- ZIP code: 85135
- Area code: 520
- GNIS feature ID: 5646
- Website: townofhaydenaz.gov

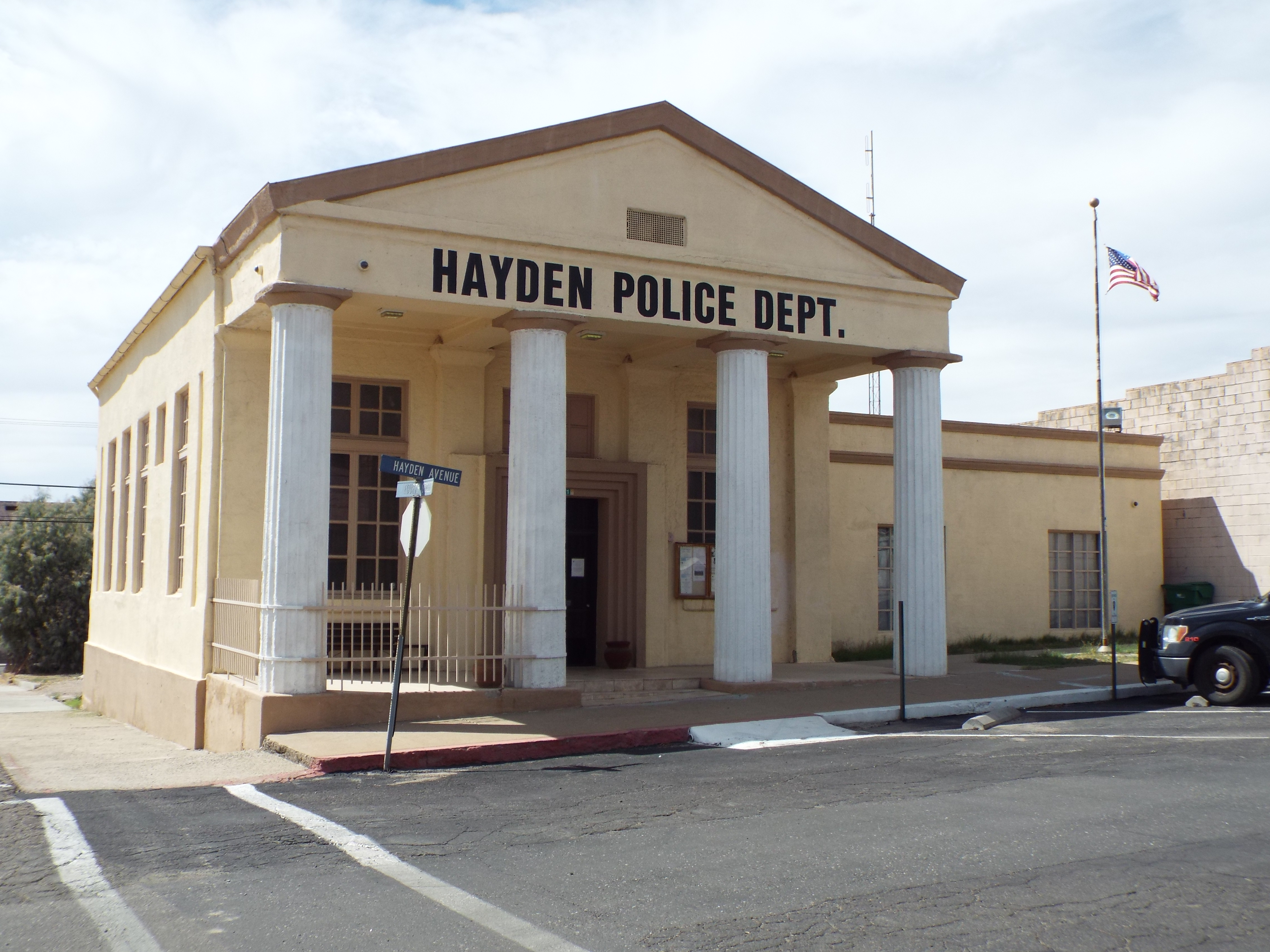
Former Valley National Bank building, built 1912

Hayden is a town in Gila and Pinal counties in Arizona, United States. As of the 2020 census, Hayden had a population of 512.

== History ==
Hayden was founded in 1909 and owned by the Kennecott Copper Corp. In 1912, the company built a 1,000 ft (300 m) smelter named the "Hayden Smelter". It was the tallest smelter chimney in Arizona. The mine is now owned by the American Smelting and Refining Company. The town is now in the process of becoming a ghost town.

One of the main reasons the people are abandoning the town is that the crime rate is much higher in Hayden than the Arizona average crime rate. It is also much higher than the national average crime rate in the rest of the United States.

Pollution is another factor which has contributed to the abandonment of the town by its residents. The illegal amounts of lead, arsenic and eight other dangerous compounds released by the smelter were so huge that in 2011, the U.S. Environmental Protection Agency (EPA) took action against the smelter.

Hayden's economy began to decline as the mine veins became depleted. The crime rate rose and residents began to move out. There were also political scandals. Businesses closed, and churches, schools and houses were abandoned or burned. The Valley National Bank abandoned its building, and it is now occupied by the Hayden Police Department. According to the mayor, Bob Smith, Hayden has more police cars than police officers.

== Geography ==
Hayden is adjacent to Winkelman. According to the United States Census Bureau, the town has a total area of 1.3 square miles (3.4 km^{2}), all land.

== Demographics ==
Historical population
Census	Pop.	Note	%±
1940	1,577		—
1950	1,494		−5.3%
1960	1,760		17.8%
1970	1,283		−27.1%
1980	1,205		−6.1%
1990	909		−24.6%
2000	892		−1.9%
2010	662		−25.8%
2020	512		−22.7%
U.S. Decennial Census

At the 2000 census, there were 892 people, 288 households, and 222 families living in the town. The population density was 707.1 inhabitants per square mile (273.0/km^{2}). There were 334 housing units at an average density of 264.8 units per square mile (102.2 units/km^{2}). The racial makeup of the town was 57.0% White, 0.5% Black or African American, 1.7% Native American, 0.6% Pacific Islander, 35.1% from other races, and 5.3% from two or more races. 84.5% of the population were Hispanic or Latino of any race. Of the 288 households, 31.6% had children under the age of 18 living with them, 54.5% were married couples living together, 13.5% had a female householder with no husband present, and 22.9% were non-families. 21.5% of households were one person and 9.0% were one person aged 65 or older. The average household size was 3.10 and the average family size was 3.56.

The age distribution was 33.2% under the age of 18, 9.0% from 18 to 24, 20.5% from 25 to 44, 23.2% from 45 to 64, and 14.1% 65 or older. The median age was 32 years. For every 100 females, there were 93.9 males. For every 100 females age 18 and over, there were 91.6 males.

The median household income was $24,293 and the median family income was $26,964. Males had a median income of $35,521 versus $22,500 for females. The per capita income for the town was $9,797. About 20.1% of families and 27.3% of the population were below the poverty line, including 35.2% of those under age 18 and 14.9% of those age 65 or over.

== Economy ==
The economic base of Hayden's economy is the Asarco Hayden Smelter.

== Notable people ==
- Dick Tuck (1924–2018), politician consultant, was born in Hayden.

== See also ==
- List of towns in Arizona
